= United States House Homeland Security Subcommittee on Counterterrorism and Intelligence =

Subcommittee of Committee on Homeland Security
- Active United States House of Representatives; 119th Congress

Leadership
- Chair: August Pfluger (R)
- Ranking Member: Seth Magaziner (D)

Structure
- Seats: 11 (11 currently filled) 6/6 5/5
- Political parties: Majority (6): Republican (6); Minority (5): Democratic (5)

Meeting place
- 176, Ford House Office Building; Washington, D.C. 20515

Phone number
- (202)-226-8417

The Homeland Security Subcommittee on Counterterrorism, Law Enforcement and Intelligence is a subcommittee within the House Homeland Security Committee. The Subcommittee's focuses are:

- DHS’s effectiveness in fulfilling its homeland security and counterterrorism mission, operations, and preparedness;
- The ability of DHS to identify and deter threats through the collection, analysis, and dissemination of homeland security information and intelligence across federal, state, local, and private sector partners
- Strengthening the protective, investigative, and cyber missions of USSS
- The protection of federal facilities; and enhancing training, resources, and support for law enforcement.

The Subcommittee maintains legislative oversight of the Office of Intelligence and Analysis, the U.S. Secret Service, the Federal Protective Service, the Federal Law Enforcement Training Centers, and the Office of Operations Coordination.

Between 2019 and 2023, it was known as the Homeland Security Subcommittee on Intelligence and Counterterrorism. It was renamed when Republicans gained the majority.

== Members, 119th Congress ==
Majority	Minority
August Pfluger, Texas, Chair; Marjorie Taylor Greene, Georgia; Tony Gonzales, Texas; Morgan Luttrell, Texas; Gabe Evans, Colorado; Ryan Mackenzie, Pennsylvania	Seth Magaziner, Rhode Island, Ranking Member; Lou Correa, California; Dan Goldman, New York; Pablo Hernández Rivera, Puerto Rico; Nellie Pou, New Jersey
Ex officio
Mark Green, Tennessee	Bennie Thompson, Mississippi

== Historical membership rosters ==
=== 118th Congress ===
Majority	Minority
August Pfluger, Texas, Chair; Dan Bishop, North Carolina; Tony Gonzales, Texas; Anthony D'Esposito, New York; Eli Crane, Arizona	Seth Magaziner, Rhode Island, Ranking Member; Lou Correa, California; Dan Goldman, New York; Dina Titus, Nevada
Ex officio
Mark Green, Tennessee	Bennie Thompson, Mississippi

=== 117th Congress ===
Majority	Minority
Elissa Slotkin, Michigan, Chair; Sheila Jackson Lee, Texas; James Langevin, Rhode Island; Eric Swalwell, California; Josh Gottheimer, New Jersey; Tom Malinowski, New Jersey	August Pfluger, Texas, Ranking Member; Michael Guest, Mississippi; Jeff Van Drew, New Jersey; Jake LaTurner, Kansas; Peter Meijer, Michigan
Ex officio
Bennie Thompson, Mississippi	John Katko, New York

=== 116th Congress ===
Majority	Minority
Max Rose, New York, Chair; Sheila Jackson Lee, Texas; James Langevin, Rhode Island; Elissa Slotkin, Michigan	Mark Walker, North Carolina, Ranking Member; Peter T. King, New York; Mark Green, Tennessee
Ex officio
Bennie Thompson, Mississippi	Mike Rogers, Alabama

=== 115th Congress ===
Majority	Minority
Peter T. King, New York, Chairman; Lou Barletta, Pennsylvania; Scott Perry, Pennsylvania; Will Hurd, Texas; Mike Gallagher, Wisconsin	Kathleen Rice, New York, Ranking Member; Sheila Jackson Lee, Texas; Bill Keating, Massachusetts
Ex officio
Mike McCaul, Texas	Bennie Thompson, Mississippi
