= United States Department of Homeland Security =

United States federal executive department

- Seal of the U.S. Department of Homeland Security

- Flag of the U.S. Department of Homeland Security

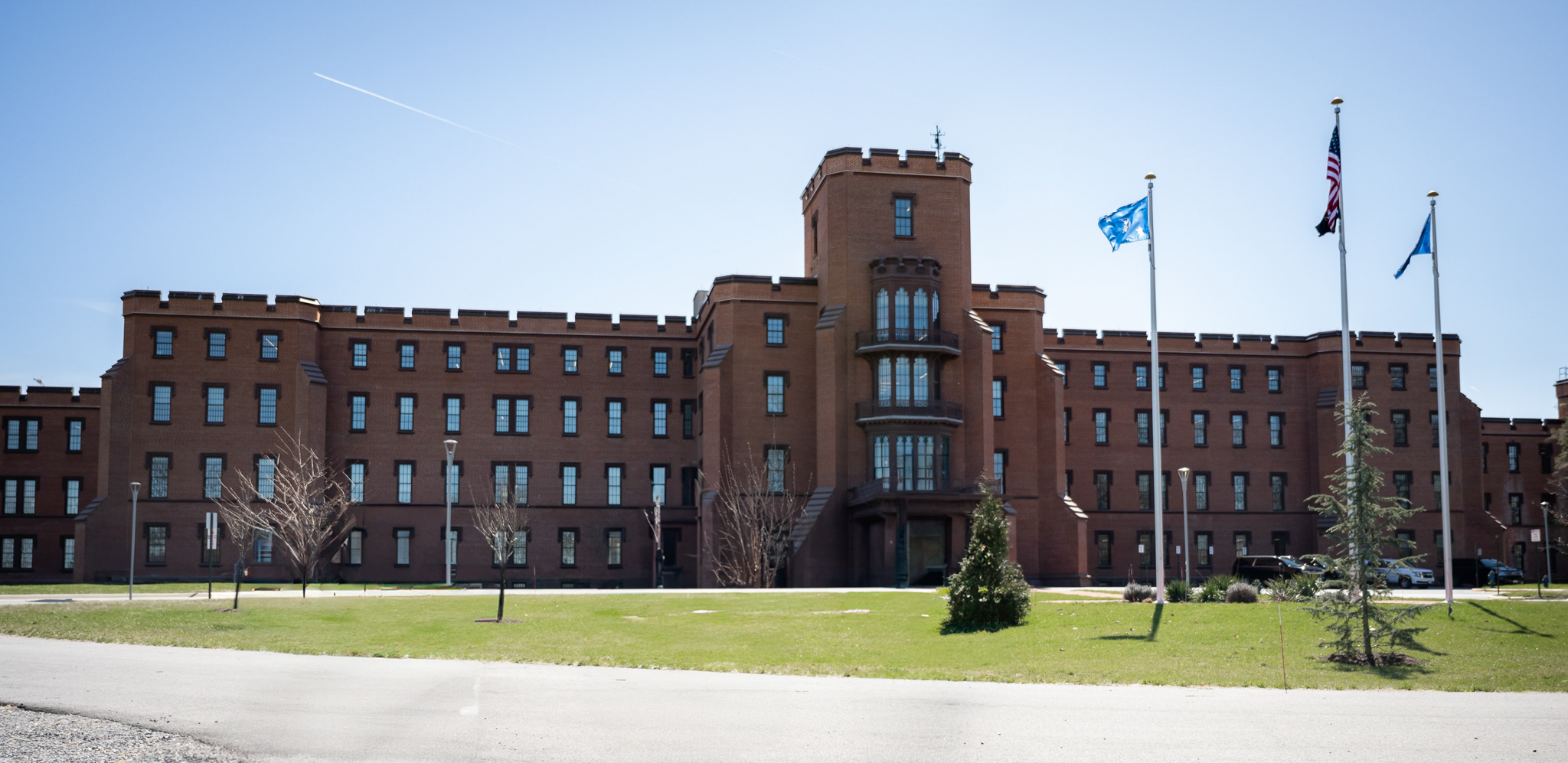
- Headquarters of the U.S. Department of Homeland Security in Washington D.C.

Agency overview
- Formed: November 25, 2002
- Jurisdiction: U.S. federal government
- Headquarters: St. Elizabeths West Campus, Washington, D.C., U.S.; 38.8547°N 77.0000°W
- Employees: 260,000
- Annual budget: $103.2 billion (FY 2024)
- Secretary responsible: Markwayne Mullin, Secretary
- Deputy Secretary responsible: Troy Edgar, Deputy Secretary
- Child agencies: United States Citizenship and Immigration Services; United States Customs and Border Protection; Federal Emergency Management Agency; United States Immigration and Customs Enforcement; Transportation Security Administration; United States Coast Guard (during times of peace); Cybersecurity and Infrastructure Security Agency; United States Secret Service; Federal Law Enforcement Training Center; Federal Protective Service; Citizenship & Immigration Services Ombudsmen; Office of Countering Weapons of Mass Destruction; Management Directorate; Office for Civil Rights & Civil Liberties; Office of General Counsel; Office of the Immigration Detention Ombudsman; Office of Intelligence & Analysis; Office of Legislative Affairs; Office of Situational Awareness; Office of Partnership & Engagement; Office of Strategy, Policy and Plans; Office of Public Affairs; Office of the Inspector General; Privacy Office; Science & Technology Directorate
- Key document: Homeland Security Act of 2002
- Website: dhs.gov
- Agency ID: 7000
- "The DHS March"

The United States Department of Homeland Security (DHS) is the U.S. federal executive department responsible for public security, comparable to interior ministries abroad. Its missions involve anti-terrorism, civil defense, immigration and customs, border control, cybersecurity, transportation security, maritime security and sea rescue, and the mitigation of weapons of mass destruction.

It began operations on March 1, 2003, after being formed in a restructuring of the U.S. federal government prescribed by the Homeland Security Act of 2002, enacted in response to the September 11 attacks. With more than 240,000 employees, DHS is the third-largest Cabinet department, after the departments of Defense and Veterans Affairs. Homeland security policy is coordinated at the White House by the Homeland Security Council. Other agencies with significant homeland security responsibilities include the departments of Health and Human Services, Justice, and Energy.

== History ==
=== Creation ===
A video released in 2016 by the DHS, detailing its duties and responsibilities

In response to the September 11 attacks, President George W. Bush announced the establishment of the Office of Homeland Security (OHS) to coordinate "homeland security" efforts. The office was headed by former Pennsylvania governor Tom Ridge, who assumed the title of Assistant to the President for Homeland Security. The official announcement states:

The mission of the Office will be to develop and coordinate the implementation of a comprehensive national strategy to secure the United States from terrorist threats or attacks. The Office will coordinate the executive branch's efforts to detect, prepare for, prevent, protect against, respond to, and recover from terrorist attacks within the United States.

Ridge began his duties as OHS director on October 8, 2001. According to The Washington Post, the Bush administration initially had "zero interest" in creating DHS, and Vice President Dick Cheney thought it would needlesly increase the size of government. Politico described Bush as resisting the creation of the cabinet-level department for months, hoping to build a structure similar to the National Security Council to coordinate interagency work, but political pressure for a reorganization ultimately became "inescapable". On November 25, 2002, the Homeland Security Act established the Department of Homeland Security to consolidate U.S. executive branch organizations related to "homeland security" into a single Cabinet agency. In January 2003, the office was superseded, but not replaced by the Department of Homeland Security and the White House Homeland Security Council, both of which were created by the Homeland Security Act of 2002. The Homeland Security Council, similar in nature to the National Security Council, retained a policy coordination and advisory role and is led by the assistant to the president for homeland security. The Gilmore Commission, supported by much of Congress and John Bolton, helped to solidify further the need for the department. The DHS incorporated the following 22 agencies.

List of incorporated agencies for DHS establishment
Original agency	Original department	New agency or office after transfer
U.S. Customs Service	Treasury	U.S. Customs and Border Protection; U.S. Immigration and Customs Enforcement
Immigration and Naturalization Service	Justice	U.S. Customs and Border Protection; U.S. Immigration and Customs Enforcement; U.S. Citizenship and Immigration Services
Federal Protective Service	General Services Administration	Management Directorate
Transportation Security Administration	Transportation	Transportation Security Administration
Federal Law Enforcement Training Center	Treasury	Federal Law Enforcement Training Center
Animal and Plant Health Inspection Service (part)	Agriculture	U.S. Customs and Border Protection
Federal Emergency Management Agency	none	Federal Emergency Management Agency (FEMA)
Strategic National Stockpile	Health and Human Services	Originally assigned to FEMA, but returned to HHS in July 2004
National Disaster Medical System	Health and Human Services	Originally assigned to FEMA, but returned to HHS in August 2006
Nuclear Incident Response Team	Energy	Responsibilities distributed within FEMA
Domestic Emergency Support Team	Justice	Responsibilities distributed within FEMA
Center for Domestic Preparedness	Justice (FBI)	Responsibilities distributed within FEMA
CBRN Countermeasures Programs	Energy	Science & Technology Directorate
Environmental Measurements Laboratory	Energy	Science & Technology Directorate
National Biological Warfare; Defense Analysis Center	Defense	Science & Technology Directorate
Plum Island Animal Disease Center	Agriculture	Science & Technology Directorate
Federal Computer Incident Response Center	General Services Administration	US-CERT, Office of Cybersecurity and Communications; National Programs and Preparedness Directorate (now CISA)
National Communications System	Defense	Office of Cybersecurity and Communications; National Programs and Predaredness Directorate
National Infrastructure Protection Center	Justice (FBI)	Office of Operations Coordination; Office of Infrastructure Protection
Energy Security and Assurance Program	Energy	Office of Infrastructure Protection
U.S. Coast Guard	Transportation	U.S. Coast Guard
U.S. Secret Service	Treasury	U.S. Secret Service

According to political scientist Peter Andreas, the creation of DHS constituted the most significant government reorganization since the Cold War and the most substantial reorganization of federal agencies since the National Security Act of 1947 (which had placed the different military departments under a secretary of defense and created the National Security Council and Central Intelligence Agency). Creation of DHS constitutes the most diverse merger ever of federal functions and responsibilities, incorporating 22 government agencies into a single organization.

The founding of the DHS also marked a change in American thought towards threats, reflective of the culture of anxiety and fear which had come about in the wake of the September 11 attacks. Introducing the term "homeland" centers attention on a population percived to be vulnerable, and which needs to be protected not only against emergencies such as natural disasters but also against hypothetical diffuse threats from individuals who are non-native to the United States. During the signing of the Homeland Security Act, President Bush spoke of "ruthless killers who move and plot in shadows."

Prior to the signing of the bill, controversy about its adoption was focused on whether the Federal Bureau of Investigation and the Central Intelligence Agency should be incorporated in part or in whole (neither was included). The bill was also controversial for the presence of unrelated "riders", as well as for eliminating certain union-friendly civil service and labor protections for department employees. Without these protections, employees could be expeditiously reassigned or dismissed on grounds of security, incompetence or insubordination, and DHS would not be required to notify their union representatives. The plan stripped 180,000 government employees of their union rights. In 2002, Bush officials argued the September 11 attacks made the proposed elimination of employee protections imperative.

In an August 5, 2002, speech, President Bush said: "We are fighting ... to secure freedom in the homeland." Prior to the creation of DHS, U.S. Presidents had referred to the U.S. as "the nation" or "the republic" and to its internal policies as "domestic". Also unprecedented was the use, from 2002, of the phrase "the homeland" by White House spokespeople.

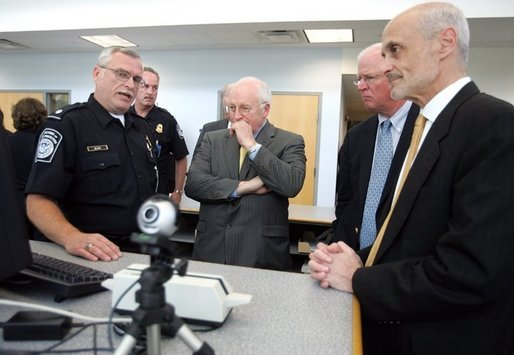
A U.S. Customs and Border Protection officer addresses Vice President Dick Cheney (center); Saxby Chambliss (center right), a U.S. Senator from Georgia; and Michael Chertoff (far right), the second head of the DHS; in 2005

Congress ultimately passed the Homeland Security Act of 2002, and President Bush signed the bill into law on November 25, 2002. It was the largest U.S. government reorganization in the 50 years since the United States Department of Defense was created.

Tom Ridge was named secretary on January 24, 2003, and began naming his chief deputies. DHS officially began operations on January 24, 2003, but most of the department's component agencies were not transferred into the new department until March 1.

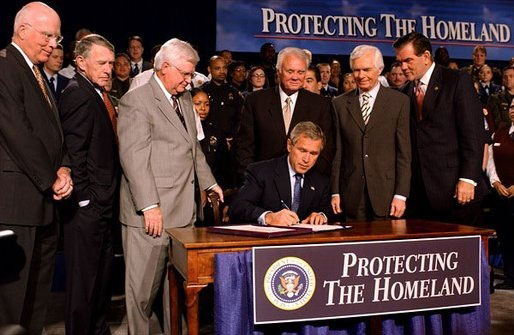
President George W. Bush signs the Homeland Security Appropriations Act of 2004 on October 1, 2003.

After establishing the basic structure of DHS and working to integrate its components, Ridge announced his resignation on November 30, 2004, following the re-election of President Bush. Bush initially nominated former New York City Police Department commissioner Bernard Kerik as his successor, but on December 10, Kerik withdrew his nomination, citing personal reasons and saying it "would not be in the best interests" of the country for him to pursue the post.

=== Changes under Secretary Chertoff ===
On January 11, 2005, President Bush nominated federal judge Michael Chertoff to succeed Ridge. Chertoff was confirmed on February 15, 2005, by a vote of 98–0 in the U.S. Senate and was sworn in the same day.

In February 2005, DHS and the Office of Personnel Management issued rules relating to employee pay and discipline for a new personnel system named MaxHR. The Washington Post said the rules would allow DHS "to override any provision in a union contract by issuing a department-wide directive" and would make it "difficult, if not impossible, for unions to negotiate over arrangements for staffing, deployments, technology and other workplace matters". In August 2005, U.S. District judge Rosemary M. Collyer blocked the plan on the grounds it did not ensure collective-bargaining rights for DHS employees. A federal appeals court ruled against DHS in 2006; pending a final resolution to the litigation, Congress's fiscal year 2008 appropriations bill for DHS provided no funding for the proposed new personnel system. DHS announced in early 2007 a retooling in pay structure. In a February 2008 court filing, DHS said that it would no longer pursue the new rules, and that it would abide by the existing civil service labor-management procedures. A federal court issued an order closing the case. Chertoff's successor, Secretary Janet Napolitano deployed full body scanners to assist the United States Secret Service in 2012.

=== Trump and Biden administrations ===
A 2017 memo by Secretary of Homeland Security John F. Kelly directed DHS to disregard "age as a basis for determining when to collect biometrics." On November 16, 2018, President Donald Trump signed the Cybersecurity and Infrastructure Security Agency Act of 2018 into law, which elevated the mission of the former DHS National Protection and Programs Directorate and established the Cybersecurity and Infrastructure Security Agency. In fiscal year 2018, DHS was allocated a net discretionary budget of $47.716 billion.

In 2021, during the Biden Administration, the Department of Justice began carrying out an investigation into white supremacy and extremism in the DHS ranks. DHS also halted large-scale immigration raids at job sites, saying in October 2021 that the administration was planning "a new enforcement strategy to more effectively target employers who pay substandard wages and engage in exploitative labor practices." In 2023, the U.S. Customs and Border Patrol began using an app which requires asylum seekers to submit biometric information before they enter the country. In June 2024, John Boyd, the head of the DHS Office of Biometric Identity Management, announced at a conference that the agency "is looking into ways it might use facial recognition technology to track the identities of migrant children." According to Boyd, the initiative is intended to advance the development of facial recognition algorithms. A former DHS official said that every migrant processing center he visited engaged in biometric identity collection, and that children were not separated out during processing. DHS denied collecting the biometric data of children under 14.

Starting in February 2026, in the Second presidency of Donald Trump, DHS was subjected to a 76 day government shutdown, the longest agency shutdown in the history of the United States, as Democrats within Congress demanded reforms to the department.

== Function ==
Whereas the Department of Defense is charged with military actions abroad, the Department of Homeland Security works in the civilian sphere to protect the United States within, at, and outside its borders. Its stated goal is to prepare for, prevent, and respond to domestic emergencies, particularly terrorism. On March 1, 2003, the DHS absorbed the U.S. Customs Service and Immigration and Naturalization Service (INS) and assumed its duties. In doing so, it divided the enforcement and services functions into two separate and new agencies: Immigration and Customs Enforcement and Citizenship and Immigration Services. The investigative divisions and intelligence gathering units of the INS and Customs Service were merged forming Homeland Security Investigations, the primary investigative arm of DHS. Additionally, the border enforcement functions of the INS, including the U.S. Border Patrol, the U.S. Customs Service, and the Animal and Plant Health Inspection Service were consolidated into a new agency under DHS: U.S. Customs and Border Protection. The Federal Protective Service falls under the Management Directorate.

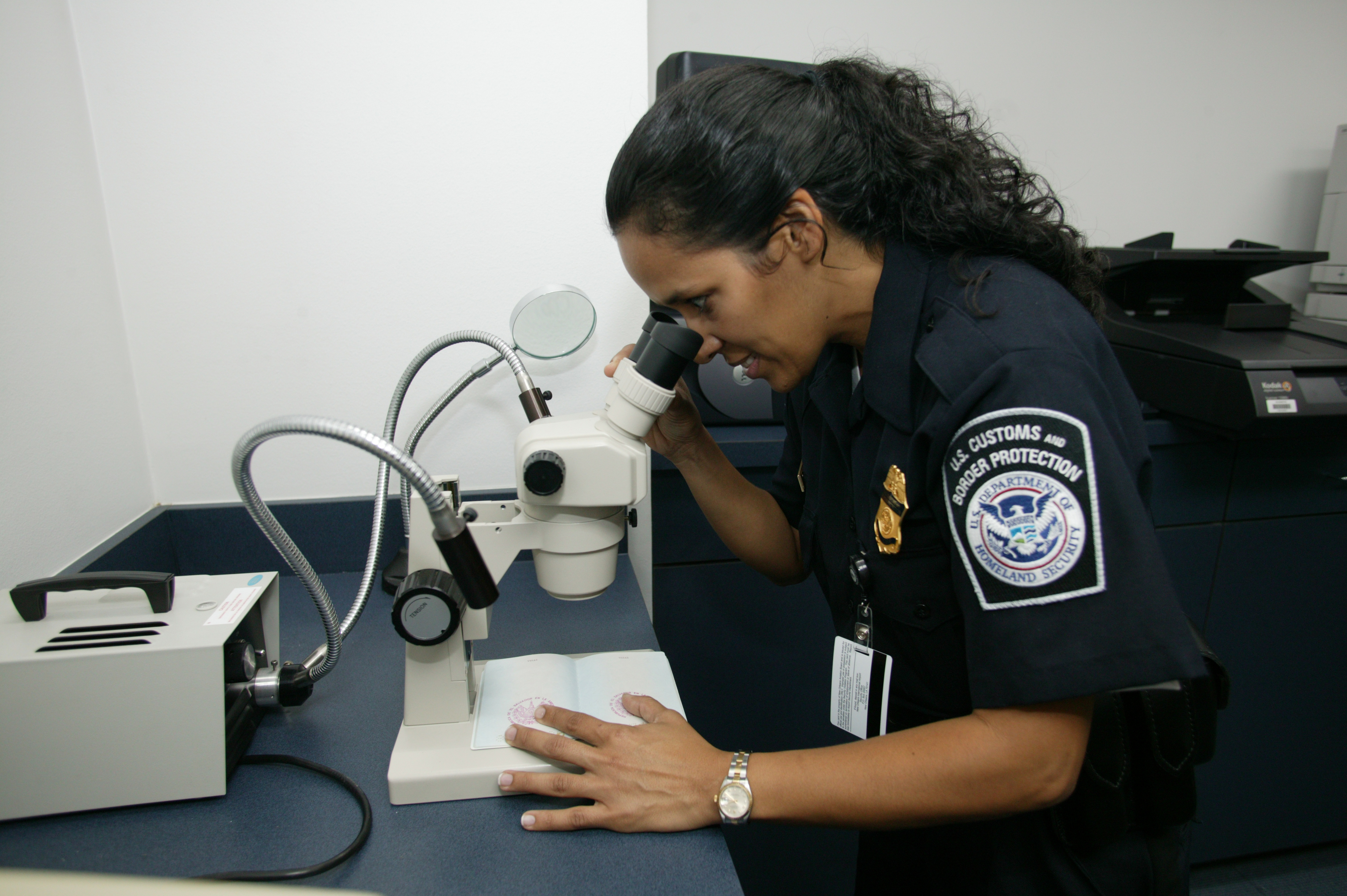
U.S. CBP Office of Field Operations officer checking the authenticity of a travel document at an international airport using a stereo microscope

== Organizational structure ==
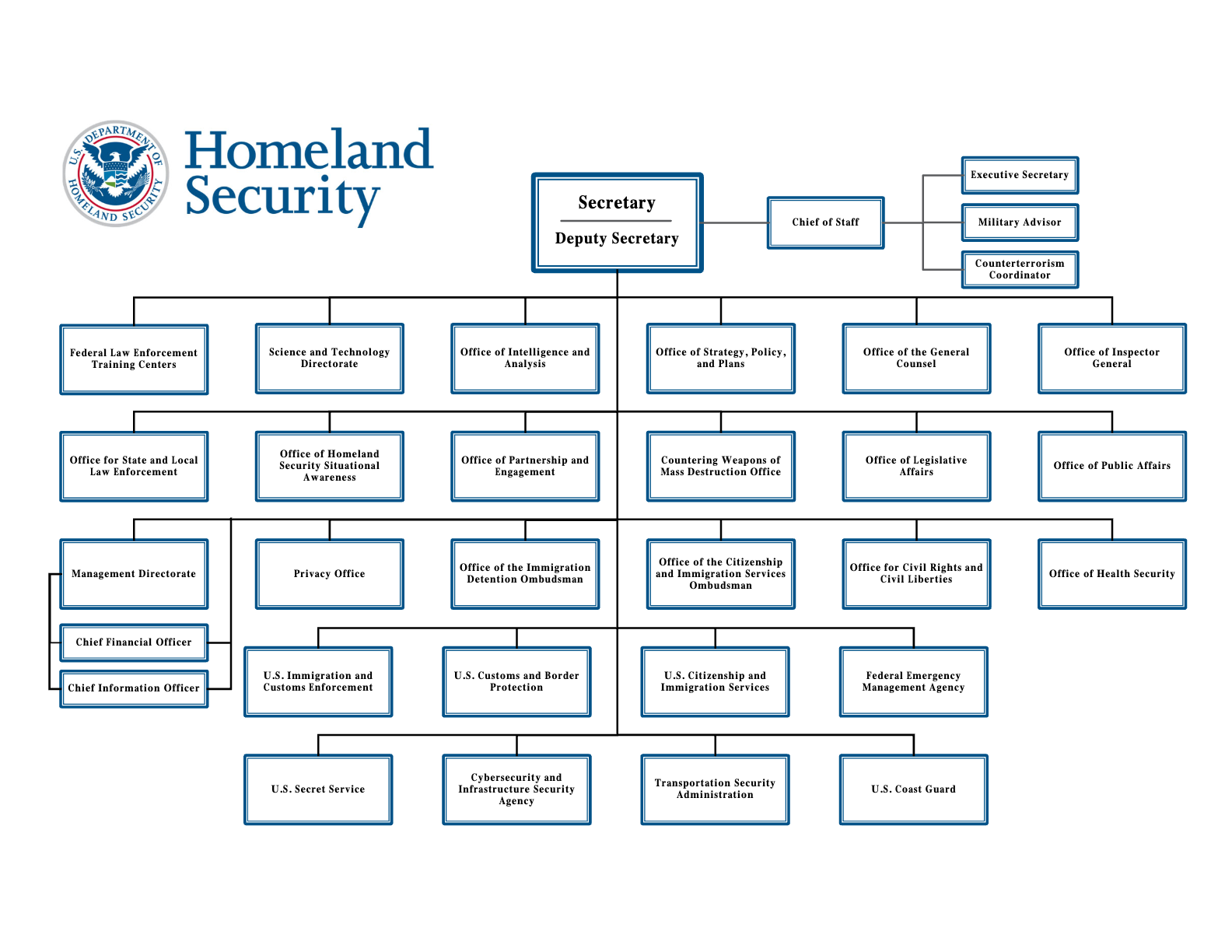
DHS Organizational Chart | November 9, 2023

The Department of Homeland Security is headed by the secretary of homeland security with the assistance of the deputy secretary. DHS contains operational components, executing specific missions under the purview of the DHS; support components, supporting the mission of the DHS and operational components; and components in the Office of the Secretary, supporting department leadership, DHS components, and the secretary by overseeing and establishing policy.

=== U.S. Citizenship and Immigration Services ===
United States Citizenship and Immigration Services (USCIS) oversees lawful immigration into the United States. Note that Passports for U.S. citizens are issued by the U.S. Department of State, not the Department of Homeland Security.

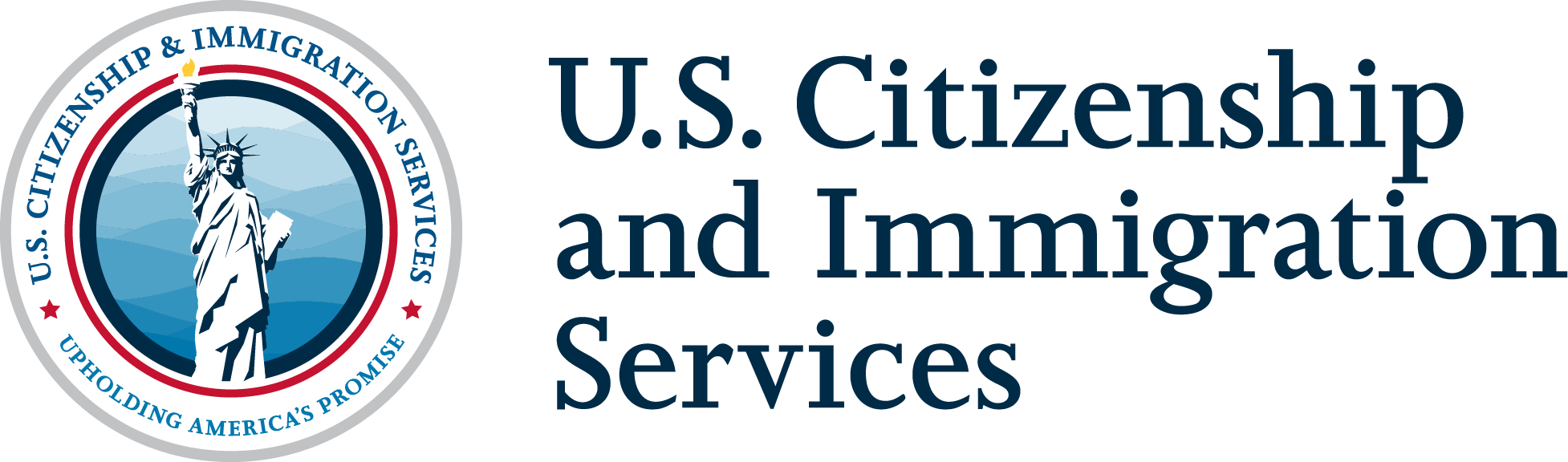
USCIS Wordmark

==== Executives ====
- Director, Joseph B. Edlow
- Deputy Director, Angelica Alfonso-Royals

==== Subordinate components ====
- Office of Performance and Quality
- Office of Investigations
- Office of Privacy
- Office of Administrative Appeals
- Immigration Records and Identity Services Directorate
- Field Operations Directorate
- External Affairs Directorate
- Fraud Detection and National Security Directorate
- Management Directorate
- Service Center Operations Directorate
- Asylum and International Operations Directorate

=== U.S. Coast Guard ===
The United States Coast Guard (USCG) is the maritime security, search and rescue, and law enforcement service branch of the U.S. Armed Forces. It is under the Department of Homeland Security during times of peace, and under the U.S. Department of the Navy during wartime.

USCG Seal

==== Executives ====
- Commandant, Admiral Kevin E. Lunday
- Vice Commandant, Vice Admiral Thomas G. Allan Jr.

==== Subordinate components ====
- Coast Guard Cyber Command
- Atlantic Area
  - Coast Guard Northeast District
  - Coast Guard East District
  - Coast Guard Southeast District
  - Coast Guard Heartland District
  - Coast Guard Great Lakes District
- Pacific Area
  - Coast Guard Southwest District
  - Coast Guard Northwest District
  - Coast Guard Oceania District
  - Coast Guard Arctic District

=== U.S. Customs and Border Protection ===
United States Customs and Border Protection (CBP) is a law enforcement agency responsible for protecting the U.S. border against illegal entry, illicit activity, and other threats; combatting transnational crime and terrorism that's a threat to the economic and national security of the United States; and facilitating lawful trade and lawful entry into the United States.

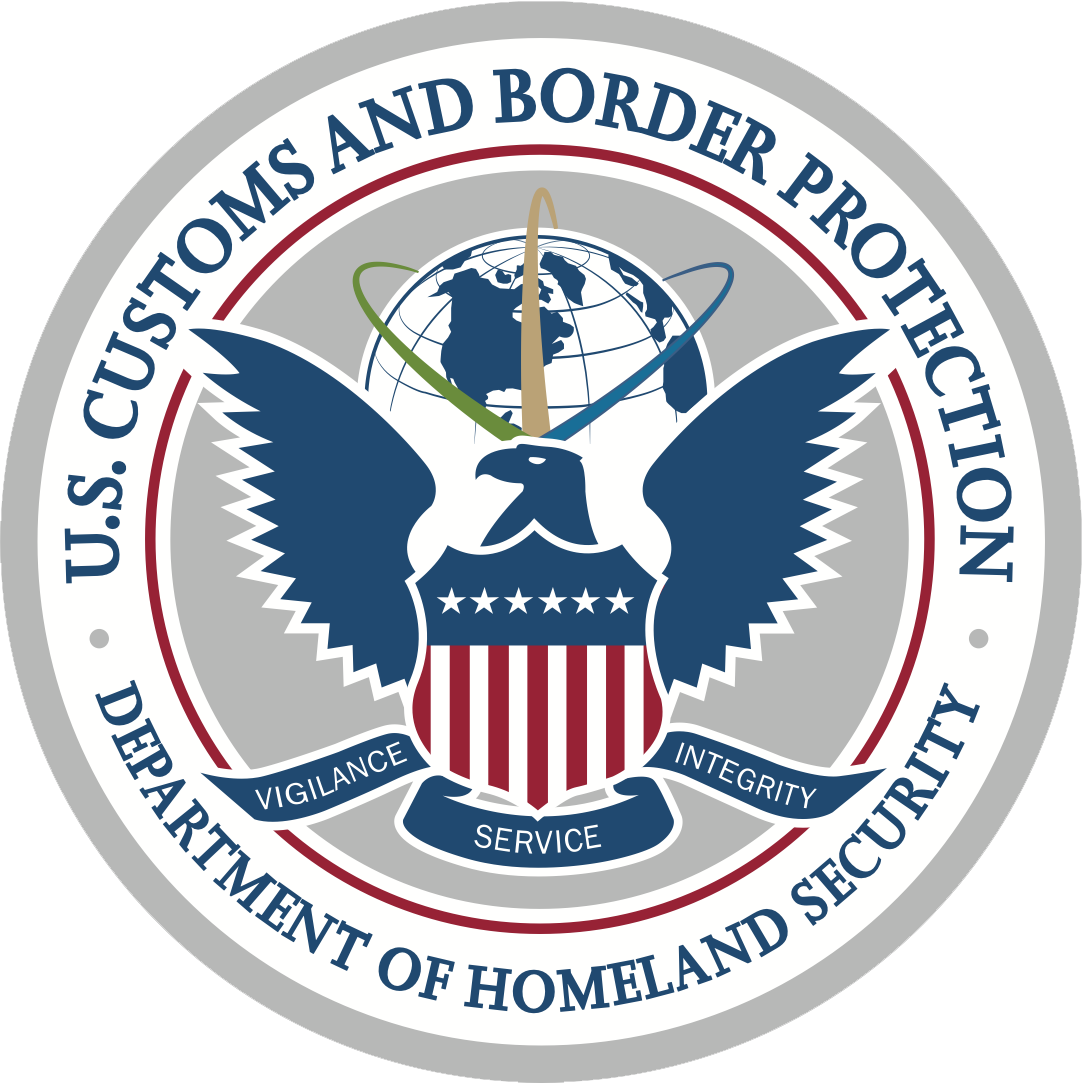
CBP Seal

==== Executives ====
- Commissioner, Rodney S. Scott
- Deputy Commissioner, Ronald Vitello

==== Subordinate components ====
- U.S. Border Patrol
- Office of Field Operations
- Air and Marine Operations
- Office of Trade
- Enterprise Services Office
- Operations Support Office

=== U.S. Cybersecurity and Infrastructure Security Agency ===
CISA Seal

The United States Cybersecurity and Infrastructure Security Agency (CISA) is the leading entity of the U.S. federal government in understanding, managing, and reducing risk to cyber and physical infrastructure across the United States.

==== Executives ====
- Director, Nick Andersen (acting)
- Deputy Director, vacant

==== Subordinate components ====
- Cybersecurity Division
- Infrastructure Security Division
- Emergency Communications Division
- Integrated Operations Division
- Stakeholder Engagement Division
- National Risk Management Center

=== U.S. Federal Emergency Management Agency ===
FEMA Wordmark

The United States Federal Emergency Management Agency (FEMA) invests in, improves, and supports capabilities to respond to, mitigate, protect against, recover from, and to prepare for all hazards that may threaten the security of the United States and its citizens, such as natural disasters.

FEMA was created in 1979 through an executive order by President Jimmy Carter and became a part of the Department of Homeland Security on March 1, 2003. The headquarters of FEMA is located in Washington, D.C, and has 10 regional offices located across the country.

==== Executives ====
- Administrator, Robert J. Fenton (acting)
- Deputy Administrator, MaryAnn Tierney (acting)

==== Subordinate components ====
- Mission Support
- Regional Offices (Regions 1–10)
- Resilience
- Response and Recovery
- U.S. Fire Administration

=== U.S. Federal Law Enforcement Training Centers ===
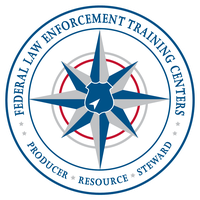
FLETC Seal

The United States Federal Law Enforcement Training Centers (FLETC) provides training services to U.S. law enforcement.

==== Executives ====
- Director, Benjamine C. Huffman
- Deputy Director, Paul E. Baker
- Associate Director for Training Operations, Ariana M. Roddini

==== Subordinate components ====
- Training Management Operations Directorate
- National Capital Region Training Operations Directorate
- Core Training Operations Directorate
- Technical Training Operations Directorate
- Mission and Readiness Support Directorate

=== U.S. Immigration and Customs Enforcement ===
ICE Wordmark

United States Immigration and Customs Enforcement (ICE) enforces federal laws governing border control, customs, immigration and trade.

==== Executives ====
- Director, David Venturella (acting)
- Deputy Director, Charles Wall

==== Subordinate components ====
- Enforcement and Removal Operations
- Homeland Security Investigations

=== U.S. Secret Service ===
USSS Logo

The United States Secret Service (USSS) is charged with the protection of the President of the United States and other government officials and persons designated by law. It also safeguards U.S. financial infrastructure and fights against counterfeiting.

==== Executives ====
- Director, Sean M. Curran
- Deputy Director, vacant

==== Subordinate components ====
- Uniformed Division
- Office of Protective Operations
- Office of Investigations

=== U.S. Transportation Security Administration ===
TSA Seal

The United States Transportation Security Administration (TSA) protects U.S. transportation systems (e.g. airport security) and ensures freedom of movement for people and commerce. It was created as a result of the September 11 attacks in the United States by the Aviation and Transportation Security Act of 2001.

==== Executives ====
- Administrator, Ha Nguyen McNeil (acting)
- Deputy Administrator, Vacant

==== Subordinate components ====
- Federal Air Marshal Service
- Security Operations
- TSA Investigations
- Operations Support
- Enterprise Support

=== DHS Management Directorate ===
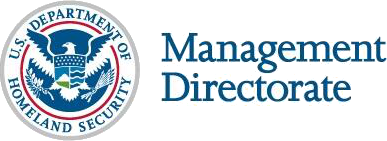
MGMT Wordmark

The Department of Homeland Security Management Directorate (MGMT) manages department finance, appropriations, accounting, budgeting, expenditures, procurement, human resources and personnel, information technology systems, biometric identification services, facilities, property, equipment, other material resources, protection of department personnel, information and resources, performance metrics, and the security of federal infrastructure.

Executives

- Under Secretary, Benjamine C. Huffman (acting)
- Deputy Under Secretary, vacant

==== Subordinate components ====
- Office of the Chief Financial Officer
- Office of the Chief Human Capital Officer
- Office of the Chief Information Officer
- Office of the Chief Procurement Officer
- Office of the Chief Readiness Support Officer
- Office of the Chief Security Officer
- Office of Program Accountability and Risk Management
- Office of Biometric Identity Management
- U.S. Federal Protective Service

=== DHS Science and Technology Directorate ===
S&T Wordmark

The Department of Homeland Security Science and Technology Directorate (S&T) is the department's research and development arm.

Executives

- Under Secretary, [Pedro Allende]
- Deputy Under Secretary, [Julie Brewer]

==== Subordinate components ====
- Office of Innovation and Collaboration
- Office of Mission and Capability Support
- Office of Enterprise Services
- Office of Science and Engineering

=== DHS Countering Weapons of Mass Destruction Office ===
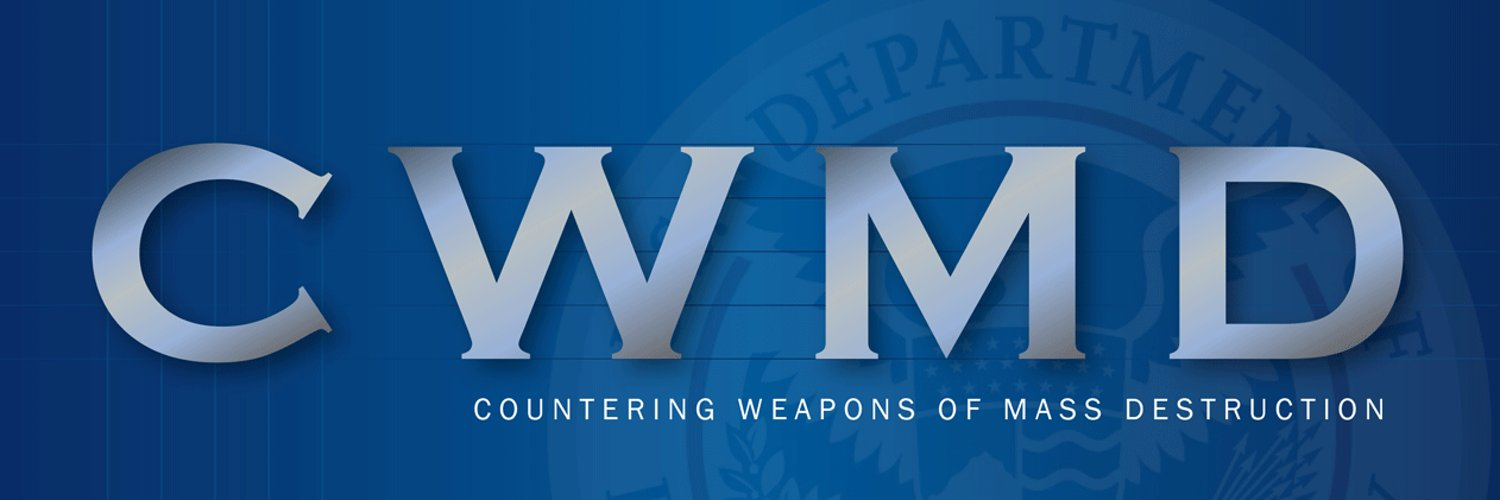
CWMD Logo

The Department of Homeland Security Countering Weapons of Mass Destruction Office (CWMD) works to prevent chemical, biological, nuclear, and radiological attacks against the United States.

==== Executives ====
- Assistant Secretary, David Richardson
- Principal Deputy Assistant Secretary, Deborah Kramer

==== Subordinate components ====
- BioWatch Program
- Securing the Cities Program
- Mobile Detection Deployment Program
- Training and Exercise Program
- CBRN Intelligence
- National Biosurveillance Integration Center

=== DHS Office of Intelligence and Analysis ===
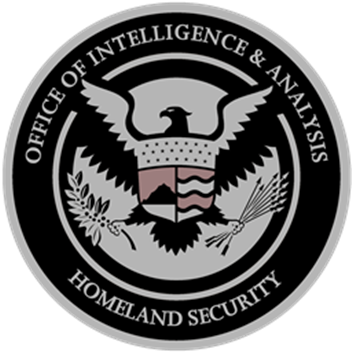
I&A Logo

The Department of Homeland Security Office of Intelligence & Analysis (I&A) is the department's intelligence arm, and disseminates timely information across the DHS enterprise and to local, state, tribal, territorial, and private sector partners.

==== Executives ====
- Under Secretary, Matthew Kozma
- Principal Deputy Under Secretary, Adam Luke (acting)

==== Subordinate components ====
- Counterterrorism Center
- Cyber Intelligence Center
- Nation-State Intelligence Center
- Transborder Security Center
- Current and Emerging Threats Center
- Office of Regional Intelligence
- Homeland Identities, Targeting & Exploitation Center

=== DHS Office of Homeland Security Situational Awareness ===
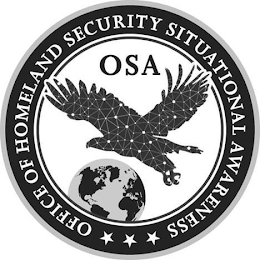
OSA Logo

The Office of Homeland Security Situational Awareness (OSA) provides operations coordination, information sharing, situational awareness, common operating picture, and executes the secretary's responsibilities across the homeland security enterprise.

==== Executives ====
- Director, Rear Admiral Christopher J. Tomney
- Deputy Director, Frank DiFalco

==== Subordinate components ====
- National Operations Center
- Integration Division
- Mission Support Division

=== DHS Office of Health Security ===
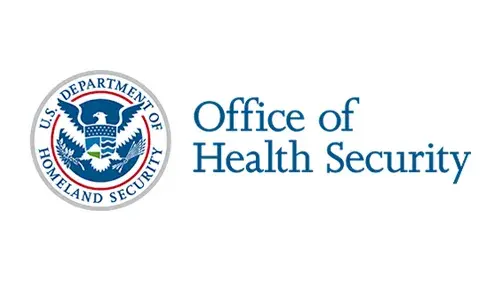
OHS Wordmark

The Department of Homeland Security Office of Health Security (OHS) is the principal medical, workforce health and safety, and public health authority for DHS.

==== Executives ====
- Director & Chief Medical Officer, Dr. Herbert Wolfe (acting)
- Deputy Director & Deputy Chief Medical Officer, Dr. Herbert Wolfe

==== Subordinate components ====
- Total Workforce Protection Directorate
- Health, Food & Agriculture Resilience Directorate
- Healthcare Systems & Oversight Directorate
- Health Information Systems & Decision Support
- Regional Operations

=== DHS Office of Inspector General ===
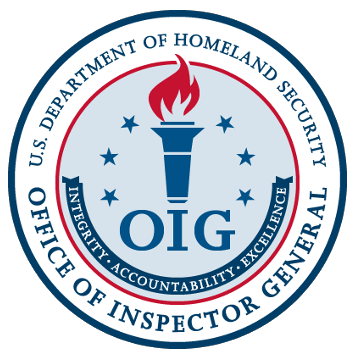
OIG Seal

The Department of Homeland Security Office of Inspector General (OIG) provides independent oversight and promotes excellence, integrity, and accountability within DHS.

==== Executives ====
- Inspector General, Joseph V. Cuffari
- Principal Deputy Inspector General, Glenn Sklar

==== Subordinate components ====
- Office of Audits
- Office of Investigations
- Office of Integrity
- Office of Management
- Office of Innovation
- Office of Inspections and Evaluations

=== DHS Office of the Secretary ===
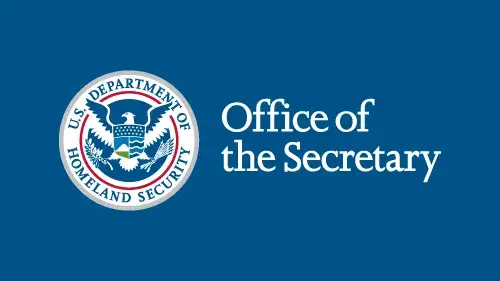
OSEC Wordmark

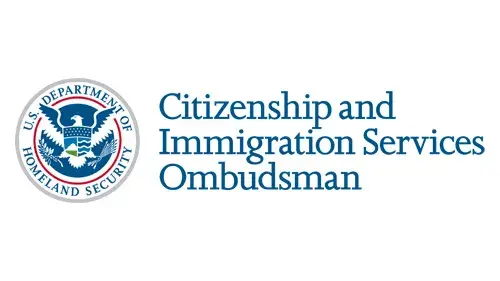
CIS Ombudsman Wordmark

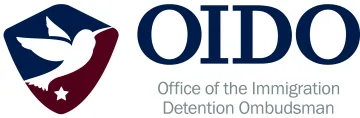
OIDO Wordmark

The Office of the Secretary of Homeland Security oversees the Department of Homeland Security's execution of its mission to safeguard the nation.

==== Executives ====
- Chief of Staff, vacant/none

==== Subordinate components ====
- Office for Civil Rights and Civil Liberties
- Climate Change Action Group
- Office of the Executive Secretary
- Family Reunification Task Force
- Office of the General Counsel
- Joint Requirements Council
- Office of Legislative Affairs
- Office of the Military Advisor
- Office of the Immigration Detention Ombudsman
- Office of the Citizenship and Immigration Ombudsman
- Office of Partnership and Engagement
- DHS Privacy Office
- Office of Public Affairs
- Office of Strategy, Policy, and Plans
- Office for State and Local Law Enforcement
- Center for Countering Human Trafficking
- Committee Management Office
- Council on Combating Gender-Based Violence
- Forced Labor Enforcement Task Force

=== DHS Advisory Panels ===
DHS advisory panels and committees provide advice and recommendations on mission-related topics from academic engagement to privacy.

- Homeland Security Academic Partnership Council (HSAPC)
- Artificial Intelligence Safety and Security Board (AISSB)
- Counternarcotics Coordinating Council (CNCC)
- Faith-Based Security Advisory Council (FBSAC)
- Homeland Security Advisory Council (HSAC)
- Data Privacy and Integrity Advisory Committee (DPIAC)
- Tribal Homeland Security Advisory Council (THSAC)

== National Terrorism Advisory System ==
In 2011, the Department of Homeland Security phased out the old Homeland Security Advisory System, replacing it with a two-level National Terrorism Advisory System. The system has two types of advisories: alerts and bulletins. NTAS bulletins permit the secretary to communicate critical terrorism information that, while not necessarily indicative of a specific threat against the United States, can reach homeland security partners or the public quickly, thereby allowing recipients to implement necessary protective measures. Alerts are issued when there is specific and credible information of a terrorist threat against the United States. Alerts have two levels: elevated and imminent. An elevated alert is issued when there is credible information about an attack but only general information about timing or a target. An Imminent Alert is issued when the threat is very specific and impending in the very near term.

The Homeland Security Advisory System scale

On March 12, 2002, the Homeland Security Advisory System, a color-coded terrorism risk advisory scale, was created as the result of a presidential directive to provide a "comprehensive and effective means to disseminate information regarding the risk of terrorist acts to Federal, State, and local authorities and to the American people". Many procedures at government facilities are tied into the alert level; for example a facility may search all entering vehicles when the alert is above a certain level. Since January 2003, it has been administered in coordination with DHS; it has also been the target of frequent jokes and ridicule on the part of the administration's detractors about its ineffectiveness. After resigning, Tom Ridge said he did not always agree with the threat level adjustments pushed by other government agencies.

== Seal ==
The seal was developed with input from senior DHS leadership, employees, and the U.S. Commission on Fine Arts. The Ad Council – which partners with DHS on its Ready.gov campaign – and the consulting company Landor Associates were responsible for graphic design and maintaining heraldic integrity.

The seal is symbolic of the Department's mission – to prevent attacks and protect Americans – on the land, in the sea and in the air. In the center of the seal, a graphically styled white American eagle appears in a circular blue field. The eagle's outstretched wings break through an inner red ring into an outer white ring that contains the words "U.S. DEPARTMENT OF" in the top half and "HOMELAND SECURITY" in the bottom half in a circular placement. The eagle's wings break through the inner circle into the outer ring to suggest that the Department of Homeland Security will break through traditional bureaucracy and perform government functions differently. In the tradition of the Great Seal of the United States, the eagle's talon on the left holds an olive branch with 13 leaves and 13 seeds while the eagle's talon on the right grasps 13 arrows. Centered on the eagle's breast is a shield divided into three sections containing elements that represent the American homeland – air, land, and sea. The top element, a dark blue sky, contains 22 stars representing the original 22 entities that have come together to form the department. The left shield element contains white mountains behind a green plain underneath a light blue sky. The right shield element contains four wave shapes representing the oceans alternating light and dark blue separated by white lines.

- DHS June 6, 2003

== Headquarters ==
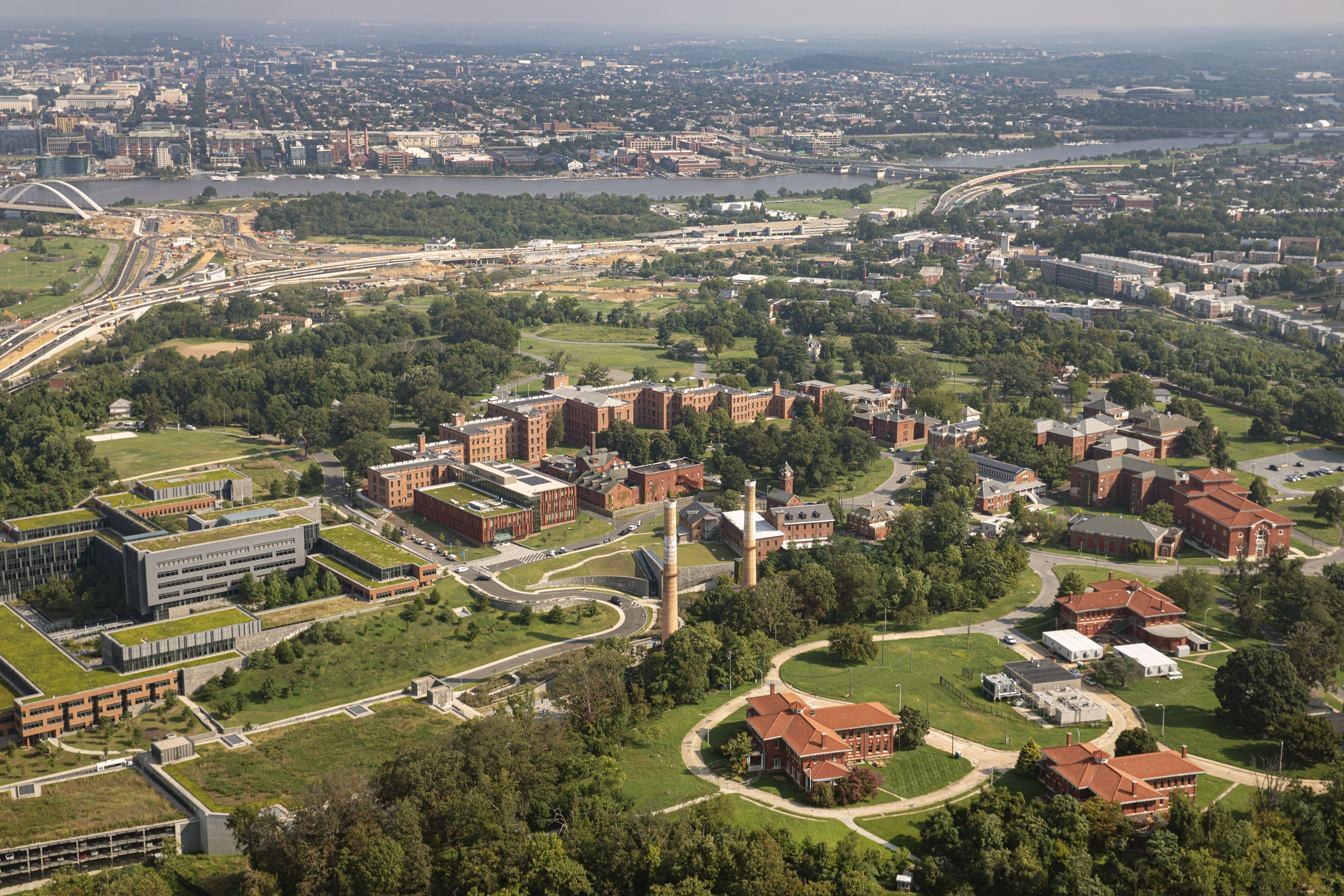
The current headquarters at St. Elizabeths West Campus

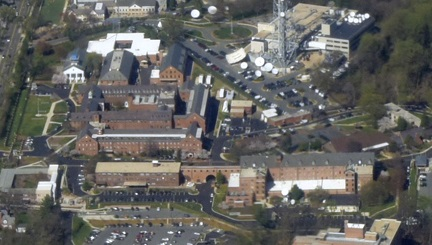
Nebraska Avenue Complex, DHS headquarters from its inception until April 2019

Since its inception, the department's temporary headquarters had been in Washington, D.C.'s Nebraska Avenue Complex, a former naval facility. The 38-acre (15 ha) site, across from American University, has 32 buildings comprising 566,000 square feet (52,600 m^{2}) of administrative space. In early 2007, the department submitted a $4.1 billion plan to Congress to consolidate its 60-plus Washington-area offices into a single headquarters complex at the St. Elizabeths Hospital campus in Anacostia, Southeast Washington, D.C.

The move was championed by District of Columbia officials because of the positive economic impact it would have on historically depressed Anacostia. The move was criticized by historic preservationists, who claimed the revitalization plans would destroy dozens of historic buildings on the campus. Community activists criticized the plans because the facility would remain walled off and have little interaction with the surrounding area.

In February 2015 the General Services Administration said that the site would open in 2021. DHS headquarters staff began moving to St. Elizabeths in April 2019 after the completion of the Center Building renovation.

== Disaster preparedness and response ==
=== Congressional budgeting effects ===
During a Senate Homeland Security and Governmental Affairs Committee hearing on the reauthorization of DHS, Deputy Secretary Elaine Duke said there is a weariness and anxiety within DHS about the repeated congressional efforts to agree to a long-term spending plan, which had resulted in several threats to shut down the federal government. "Shutdowns are disruptive", Duke said. She said the "repeated failure on a longtime spending plan resulting in short-term continuing resolutions (CRs) has caused "angst" among the department's 240,000 employees in the weeks leading up to the CRs." The uncertainty about funding hampers DHS's ability to pursue major projects and takes away attention and manpower from important priorities. Seventy percent of DHS employees are considered essential and are not furloughed during government shutdowns.

=== Ready.gov ===
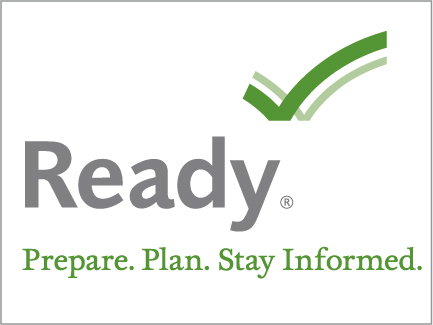
Ready.gov program logo

Soon after formation, the department worked with the Ad Council to launch the Ready Campaign, a national public service advertising (PSA) campaign to educate and empower Americans to prepare for and respond to emergencies including natural and man-made disasters. With pro bono creative support from the Martin Agency of Richmond, Virginia, the campaign website "Ready.gov" and materials were conceived in March 2002 and launched in February 2003, just before the launch of the Iraq War. One of the first announcements that garnered widespread public attention to this campaign was one by Tom Ridge in which he stated that in the case of a chemical attack, citizens should use duct tape and plastic sheeting to build a homemade bunker, or "sheltering in place" to protect themselves. As a result, the sales of duct tape skyrocketed, and DHS was criticized for being too alarmist.

On March 1, 2003, the Federal Emergency Management Agency was absorbed into the DHS and in the fall of 2008 took over coordination of the campaign. The Ready Campaign and its Spanish-language version Listo.gov asks individuals to build an emergency supply kit, make a family emergency plan and be informed about the different types of emergencies that can occur and how to respond. The campaign messages have been promoted through television, radio, print, outdoor and web PSAs, as well as brochures, toll-free phone lines and the English and Spanish language websites Ready.gov and Listo.gov.

The general campaign aims to reach all Americans, but targeted resources are also available via "Ready Business" for small- to medium-sized business and "Ready Kids" for parents and teachers of children ages 8–12. In 2015, the campaign also launched a series of PSAs to help the whole community, people with disabilities and others with access and functional needs prepare for emergencies, which included open captioning, a certified deaf interpreter and audio descriptions for viewers who are blind or have low vision.

=== National Incident Management System ===
On March 1, 2004, the National Incident Management System (NIMS) was created. The stated purpose was to provide a consistent incident management approach for federal, state, local, and tribal governments. Under Homeland Security Presidential Directive-5, all federal departments were required to adopt the NIMS and to use it in their individual domestic incident management and emergency prevention, preparedness, response, recovery, and mitigation program and activities.

=== National Response Framework ===
In December 2004, the National Response Plan (NRP) was created, in an attempt to align federal coordination structures, capabilities, and resources into a unified, all-discipline, and all-hazards approach to domestic incident management. The NRP was built on the template of the NIMS and fully went into effect in April 2005 after a 4-month transitional period.

On January 22, 2008, the National Response Framework was published in the Federal Register as an updated replacement of the NRP, effective March 22, 2008.

=== Surge Capacity Force ===
The Post-Katrina Emergency Management Reform Act directs the DHS Secretary to designate employees from throughout the department to staff a Surge Capacity Force (SCF). During a declared disaster, the DHS Secretary will determine if SCF support is necessary. The secretary will then authorize FEMA to task and deploy designated personnel from DHS components and other Federal Executive Agencies to respond to extraordinary disasters.

== Immigration enforcement ==
=== Immigration raids ===
==== New York City Canal Street raid ====
A homeland security spokesperson said, "ICE and its federal partners, including FBI, DEA, ATF, IRS-CI, and CBP, conducted a targeted, intelligence-driven enforcement operation on Canal Street in New York City, focused on criminal activity relating to selling counterfeit goods."

On October 21, 2025, Canal Street in New York City had a major immigration raid. On that day, around 50 federal agents raided the streets, where African and Chinese illegal immigrants would illegally sell counterfeit luxury items to tourists. The Department of Homeland Security said that their agents arrested nine men, mostly from West Africa, who were accused of living in the United States illegally and had prior arrests since they were "targeted in an operation 'focused on criminal activity relating to selling counterfeit goods,' ".

Assistant Secretary Tricia McLaughlin said that ICE arrested nine illegal aliens who had previous criminal histories, including "robbery, burglary, domestic violence, assaulting law enforcement, counterfeiting, drug trafficking, drug possession, and forgery."

Due to the raid, several hundred people rallied at 26 Plaza, the New York City headquarters of ICE, to protest the raid. According to reporters Li and Silva, "the raid also showed how public resistance to ICE's action is building. Protesters gathered at nearby Foley Square on Wednesday to draw attention to the raid." Protesters attempted to block immigration agents from carrying out the operations, and hundreds of angry New Yorkers "clashed with federal agents." During the protest, five protesters were taken into custody, as they were accused of assaulting law enforcement and obstructing.

==== Chicago Little Village raid ====
On September 8, Donald Trump launched the blitz, part of his Operation Midway Blitz, to enforce an immigration crackdown in the Chicago area, to catch the "worst of the worst" criminal immigrants. This operation left local critics to say that many innocent people were left terrorized.

The Department of Homeland Security said "it is launching Operation Midway Blitz, a new initiative targeting undocumented immigrants who commit crimes across Chicago and Illinois."

On October 1, 2025, the Department of Homeland Security announced that U.S. Immigration and Customs Enforcement (ICE) and U.S. Border Patrol officers had arrested more than 800 illegal aliens.

"During Operation Midway Blitz, DHS law enforcement has made more than 800 arrests across Illinois. The Trump Administration will not allow violent criminals or repeat offenders to terrorize our neighborhoods or victimize our children and innocent Americans," said Assistant Secretary Tricia McLaughlin.

On October 8, DHS said that "ICE and U.S Border Patrol officers had arrested more than 1,500 illegal aliens — including criminal pedophiles, murderers, child abusers, kidnappers, gang members, and armed robbers."

On October 22 and 23, federal agents raided Little Village, a longtime historic Mexican neighborhood in Chicago, "removing several people, causing car accidents and brandishing weapons, according to residents, local leaders and advocates." said Crowley and Loria from USA Today Network.

==== 2026 Minnesota raids ====
In January 2026, the United States Department of Homeland Security (DHS) undertook immigration enforcement operations in Minnesota, which involved the Immigration and Customs Enforcement (ICE), the U.S. Customs and Border Protection (CBP), and the U.S. Border Patrol. On January 24, 2026, during an operation in Minneapolis, the federal agents encountered Alex Jeffrey Pretti, a 37-year-old U.S. citizen, who was assisting a woman who was being confronted by the federal agents. According to an initial report by the DHS to Congress, which was obtained by CNN and CBS News, the federal agents attempted to apprehend Pretti, which led to a struggle. In the process, two federal officers fired their guns, leading to the death of Pretti.

The shooting of Pretti took place during the federal raids in the state of Minnesota. The incident was followed by public protests in Minnesota.

== Border enforcement ==
=== Automated Targeting System ===
The Automated Targeting System (ATS) is a United States Department of Homeland Security computerized system that, for every person who crosses U.S. borders, scrutinizes a large volume of data related to that person (see below), and then automatically assigns a rating for which the expectation is that it helps gauge whether this person may be placed within a risk group of terrorists or other criminals. Similarly ATS analyzes data related to container cargo.

These ratings take many details into account, such as country of origin, how travel to the U.S. was funded, and the visitor's driving record. Other more mundane details are also factored in, such as where the person is sitting on the flight and what they ordered for their meal.

The existence of such a system was first discovered by the public in November 2006, when a mention of it appeared in the Federal Register. The system was first implemented in the late 1990s, and was significantly expanded shortly after the 9/11 Terrorist Attacks.

=== "Smart Plan" ===
Trump's new "Smart Wall" plan has border walls and new surveillance technology to be placed on the Big Bend region and the remainder of Texas's southern border. On October 15, 2025, in a published notice, Homeland Security Secretary Kristi Noem wrote "that the department had determined there is an 'acute and immediate need to construct physical barriers and roads' in the U.S. Border Patrol's Big Bend Sector." The many illegal crossings and smuggling activities in the Big Bend have caused the Trump administration to crack down on border security.

On October 10, 2025, the Department of Homeland Security reveals its "Smart Plan" for the US–Mexico border, which includes:

- Fences that will stretch 1,422 miles along the border.
- Technologies with sensors will protect the remaining areas of the wall that are too rugged.
- The border will begin at the Pacific Ocean in San Diego and stretch towards the western edge of the Big Bend area in Texas. The border will pick up on the northwest of Laredo and stretch towards the Gulf of Mexico near Brownsville.
- CBP revealed that the old "wall system" will be rebranded as the "Smart Wall"

Additionally, the U.S. Customs and Border Protection agency has issued $4.5 billion to initiate construction.

The first installment of President Trump's One Big Beautiful Bill Act was used to fund tens of billions of dollars, including "230 miles of new fencing and 400 miles of new roads and technology." – Washington Times.

== Cyber-security ==
The DHS National Cyber Security Division (NCSD) is responsible for the response system, risk management program, and requirements for cyber-security in the U.S. The division is home to US-CERT operations and the National Cyber Alert System. The DHS Science and Technology Directorate helps government and private end-users transition to new cyber-security capabilities. This directorate also funds the Cyber Security Research and Development Center, which identifies and prioritizes research and development for NCSD. The center works on the Internet's routing infrastructure (the SPRI program) and Domain Name System (DNSSEC), identity theft and other online criminal activity (ITTC), Internet traffic and networks research (PREDICT datasets and the DETER testbed), Department of Defense and HSARPA exercises (Livewire and Determined Promise), and wireless security in cooperation with Canada.

The Cybersecurity and Infrastructure Security Agency (CISA) is responsible for helping the nation to understand, manage, and reduce risks to cyber and physical infrastructure. CISA is in charge of exchanging "cyber defense information and defensive operational collaboration among the federal government, and state, local, tribal, and territorial (SLTT) governments, the private sector, and international partners." CISA's first operational lead is federal cybersecurity, as well as "protecting and defending the federal civilian executive branch network." They work closely with the Office of Management and Budget, the Office of the National Cyber Director, and federal agency Chief Information Officers and Chief Information Security Officers. CISA's second operation is to serve as the national coordinator for critical infrastructure security and resilience, where they work closely with various government and industry partners to protect and defend the nation's critical infrastructure.

On October 30, 2009, DHS opened the National Cybersecurity and Communications Integration Center. The center brings together government organizations responsible for protecting computer networks and networked infrastructure.

In January 2017, DHS officially designated state-run election systems as critical infrastructure. The designation made it easier for state and local election officials to get cybersecurity help from the federal government. In October 2017, DHS convened a Government Coordinating Council (GCC) for the Election Infrastructure Subsection with representatives from various state and federal agencies such as the Election Assistance Commission and National Association of Secretaries of State.

On March 8, 2021, DHS, Science and Technology Directorates (S&T), and the Cybersecurity and Infrastructure Security Agency (CISA) announced two research and development (R&D) projects for the Secure and Resilient Mobile Network Infrastructure (SRMNI) project. The project addresses developing solutions that would improve "the government's visibility into mobile device network traffic to identify malware, attacks or attempts to extract data from or through mobile devices."

On May 4, 2026 the DHS inspector general published a report stating The Department of Homeland Security failed to effectively secure smartphones used by staff in its intelligence office, raising the risk of cyberattacks and unauthorized access to sensitive information.

== Secretaries ==
To date there have been eight confirmed secretaries of the Department of Homeland Security:

- Tom Ridge (January 24, 2003 – February 1, 2005)
- Michael Chertoff (February 15, 2005 – January 21, 2009)
- Janet Napolitano (January 20, 2009 – September 6, 2013)
- Jeh Charles Johnson (December 23, 2013 – January 20, 2017)
- John F. Kelly (January 20, 2017 – July 28, 2017)
- Kirstjen M. Nielsen (December 6, 2017 – April 10, 2019)
- Alejandro Mayorkas (February 1, 2021 – January 20, 2025)
- Kristi Noem (January 25, 2025 – March 31, 2026)
- Markwayne Mullin (March 24, 2026 – present)

== Criticism ==
=== Excess, waste, and ineffectiveness ===
The department has been dogged by persistent criticism over excessive bureaucracy, waste, ineffectiveness and lack of transparency. Congress estimates that the department has wasted roughly $15 billion in failed contracts (as of September 2008). In 2003, the department came under fire after the media revealed that Laura Callahan, Deputy Chief Information Officer at DHS with responsibilities for sensitive national security databases, had obtained her bachelor, masters, and doctorate computer science degrees through Hamilton University, a diploma mill in a small town in Wyoming. The department was blamed for up to $2 billion of waste and fraud after audits by the Government Accountability Office revealed widespread misuse of government credit cards by DHS employees, with purchases including beer brewing kits, $70,000 of plastic dog booties that were later deemed unusable, boats purchased at double the retail price (many of which later could not be found), and iPods ostensibly for use in "data storage". A 2015 inspection of IT infrastructure found that the department was running over a hundred computer systems whose owners were unknown, including Secret and Top Secret databases, many with out-of-date security or weak passwords. Basic security reviews were absent, and the department had apparently made deliberate attempts to delay publication of information about the flaws. The $53 billion construction budget allocated to CBP alone is equal to the 2024 defense expenditures of 10 European countries.

The mission creep and breadth of the mandate given to DHS has also been criticized, with Politico describing it as "amalgamation of organizational cultures" that has "struggled ever since to coalesce into one organization with a shared mission and culture". It noted Border Patrol's lobbying to keep its traditional green uniforms instead of adopting the blue DHS uniform and infighting between agencies as an example of its organizational incoherence. In 2005, The Washington Post argued that:

"To some extent, the department was set up to fail. It was assigned the awesome responsibility of defending the homeland without the investigative, intelligence and military powers of the FBI, CIA and the Pentagon; it was also repeatedly undermined by the White House that initially opposed its creation."

By 2026, DHS accounts for roughly half of all federal law enforcement personnel, and with the passage of the One Big Beautiful Bill Act, ICE, CBP, and DHS may constitute 55% to 60% of all federal law enforcement personnel.

=== Data mining ===
On September 5, 2007, the Associated Press reported that the DHS had scrapped an anti-terrorism data mining tool called ADVISE (Analysis, Dissemination, Visualization, Insight and Semantic Enhancement) after the agency's internal inspector general found that pilot testing of the system had been performed using data on real people without required privacy safeguards in place. The system, in development at Lawrence Livermore and Pacific Northwest National Laboratory since 2003, has cost the agency $42 million to date. Controversy over the program is not new; in March 2007, the Government Accountability Office stated that "the ADVISE tool could misidentify or erroneously associate an individual with undesirable activity such as fraud, crime or terrorism." Homeland Security's Inspector General later said that ADVISE was poorly planned, time-consuming for analysts to use, and lacked adequate justifications.

=== Fusion centers ===
Fusion centers are terrorism prevention and response centers, many of which were created under a joint project between the Department of Homeland Security and the U.S. Department of Justice's Office of Justice Programs between 2003 and 2007. The fusion centers gather information from government sources as well as their partners in the private sector.

They are designed to promote information sharing at the federal level between agencies such as the CIA, FBI, Department of Justice, U.S. military and state and local level government. As of July 2009, DHS recognized at least seventy-two fusion centers. Fusion centers may also be affiliated with an Emergency Operations Center that responds in the event of a disaster.

There are a number of documented criticisms of fusion centers, including relative ineffectiveness at counterterrorism activities, the potential to be used for secondary purposes unrelated to counterterrorism, and their links to violations of civil liberties of American citizens and others.

David Rittgers of the Cato Institute notes:

A long line of fusion center and DHS reports labeling broad swaths of the public as a threat to national security. The North Texas Fusion System labeled Muslim lobbyists as a potential threat; a DHS analyst in Wisconsin thought both pro- and anti-abortion activists were worrisome; a Pennsylvania homeland security contractor watched environmental activists, Tea Party groups, and a Second Amendment rally; the Maryland State Police put anti-death penalty and anti-war activists in a federal terrorism database; a fusion center in Missouri thought that all third-party voters and Ron Paul supporters were a threat ...

=== Mail interception ===
In 2006, MSNBC reported that Grant Goodman, "an 81-year-old retired University of Kansas history professor, received a letter from his friend in the Philippines that had been opened and resealed with a strip of dark green tape bearing the words "by Border Protection" and carrying the official Homeland Security seal." The letter was sent by a devout Catholic Filipino woman with no history of supporting Islamic terrorism. A spokesman for U.S. Customs and Border Protection "acknowledged that the agency can, will and does open mail coming to U.S. citizens that originates from a foreign country whenever it's deemed necessary":

All mail originating outside the United States Customs territory that is to be delivered inside the U.S. Customs territory is subject to Customs examination," says the CBP Web site. That includes personal correspondence. "All mail means 'all mail,'" said John Mohan, a CBP spokesman, emphasizing the point.

The department declined to outline what criteria are used to determine when a piece of personal correspondence should be opened or to say how often or in what volume Customs might be opening mail.

Goodman's story provoked outrage in the blogosphere, as well as in the more established media. Reacting to the incident, Mother Jones remarked "unlike other prying government agencies, Homeland Security wants you to know it is watching you." CNN observed "on the heels of the NSA wiretapping controversy, Goodman's letter raises more concern over the balance between privacy and security."

=== Employee morale ===
In July 2006, the Office of Personnel Management conducted a survey of federal employees in all 36 federal agencies on job satisfaction and how they felt their respective agency was headed. DHS was last or near to last in every category including;

- 33rd on the talent management index
- 35th on the leadership and knowledge management index
- 36th on the job satisfaction index
- 36th on the results-oriented performance culture index

The low scores were attributed to concerns about basic supervision, management and leadership within the agency. Examples from the survey reveal most concerns are about promotion and pay increase based on merit, dealing with poor performance, rewarding creativity and innovation, leadership generating high levels of motivation in the workforce, recognition for doing a good job, lack of satisfaction with various component policies and procedures and lack of information about what is going on with the organization.

DHS is the only large federal agency to score below 50% in overall survey rankings. It was last of large federal agencies in 2014 with 44.0% and fell even lower in 2015 at 43.1%, again last place. DHS continued to rank at the bottom in 2019, prompting congressional inquiries into the problem. High work load resulting from chronic staff shortage, particularly in Customs and Border Protection, has contributed to low morale, as have scandals and intense negative public opinion heightened by immigration policies of the Trump administration. Between 2005 and 2024, DHS has ranked last or second-to-last 13 times.

=== MIAC report ===
In 2009, the Missouri Information Analysis Center (MIAC) made news for targeting supporters of third party candidates (such as Ron Paul), anti-abortion activists, and conspiracy theorists as potential militia members. Anti-war activists and Islamic lobby groups were targeted in Texas, drawing criticism from the American Civil Liberties Union.

According to DHS:

The Privacy Office has identified a number of risks to privacy presented by the fusion center program:

1. Justification for fusion centers
2. Ambiguous Lines of Authority, Rules, and Oversight
3. Participation of the Military and the Private Sector
4. Data Mining
5. Excessive Secrecy
6. Inaccurate or Incomplete Information
7. Mission Creep

=== Freedom of Information Act processing performance ===
In the Center for Effective Government analysis of 15 federal agencies which receive the most Freedom of Information Act (FOIA) requests, published in 2015 (using 2012 and 2013 data), the Department of Homeland Security earned a D+ by scoring 69 out of a possible 100 points, i.e. did not earn a satisfactory overall grade. It also had not updated its policies since the 2007 FOIA amendments.

=== Social media posts and white nationalism ===
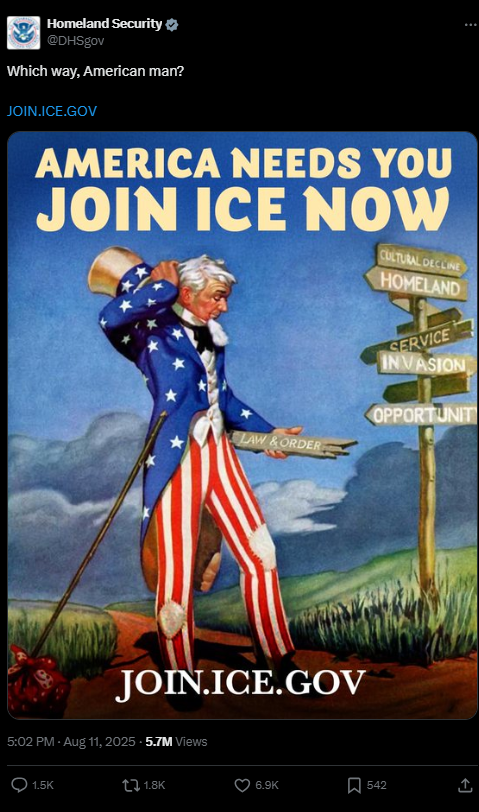
ICE recruitment tweet by DHS account on August 11, 2025. The post was connected to Which Way Western Man?, a book published by American neo-Nazi activist William Gayley Simpson and used by white nationalist groups that praise Adolf Hitler. The title of the book is a popular internet meme among the neo-Nazi movement.

During the second Trump administration, DHS has been criticized for a series of provocative social media posts. Their recruitment efforts have used memes and online influencers to promote ICE deportations, and they have used a geotargeted advertising targeting people who attended UFC fights, listened to patriotic podcasts, or had shown an interest in guns and tactical gear. Some ads used white nationalist songs and slogans. The Southern Poverty Law Center found DHS using "white nationalist and anti-immigrant images and slogans in recruitment materials" for ICE and that some "images and language appear to come directly from antisemitic and neo-Nazi publications and a white Christian nationalist website."

==== Fourteen Words slogan and "88" reference ====
In 2018, the DHS was accused of referencing the white nationalist Fourteen Words slogan in an official document, by using a similar fourteen-worded title, in relation to unlawful immigration and border control:

We Must Secure The Border And Build The Wall To Make America Safe Again.

Although dismissed by the DHS as a coincidence, both the use of "88" in a document and the similarity to the slogan's phrasing ("We must secure the existence of our people and a future for white children"), drew criticism and controversy from several media outlets.

=== Calls for abolition ===
From its outset, calls to abolish DHS have come from both conservative and liberal sources. The Cato Institute proposed abolishing DHS in 2011, the American Enterprise Institute in 2015, and the ACLU in 2020. By 2019, The Washington Post described calls to abolish DHS as being "made year after year, in publications ranging from policy journals to mainstream news outlets". Alexandria Ocasio-Cortez has suggested abolishing the DHS in light of abuses against detained migrants by the Immigration and Customs Enforcement and Customs and Border Protection agencies. By 2026, former secretary Jeh Johnson supported abolishing the agency, arguing it has outgrown its mission, is plagued by infighting, and that the immigration mission has overwhelmed the department's other work.

In 2020, the DHS was criticized for detaining protesters in Portland, Oregon. It even drew rebuke from the department's first secretary Tom Ridge who said, "It would be a cold day in hell before I would consent to an uninvited, unilateral intervention into one of my cities".

On August 10, 2020, in an opinion article for USA Today by Anthony D. Romero, the ACLU called for the dismantling of DHS over the deployment of federal forces in July 2020 during the Portland protests.

In January 2026, Ben Rhodes wrote DHS "helped build the plumbing of a domestic security state" and Operation Metro Surge "resembled a counterinsurgency campaign more than a law enforcement operation because that’s what it is — complete with tactics, equipment and legal authorities derived from the war on terror". Rhodes argued "Our obsession with security — aided by politicians determined not to appear “weak” and Supreme Court decisions that empowered the presidency paved the way for the consolidation of power. Now, Minnesota has neither security nor liberty". Rhodes wrote that the second Trump administration "should be the period that concludes the post-9/11 era".

In 2026, Delia Ramirez, and Fred Kaplan called for dismantling DHS.

=== ACLU lawsuit ===
In December 2020, ACLU filed a lawsuit against the DHS, U.S. CBP and U.S. ICE, seeking the release of their records of purchasing cellphone location data. ACLU alleges that these data were used to track U.S. citizens and immigrants and is seeking to discover the full extent of the alleged surveillance.

Documents released by the lawsuit included around 113,654 location points over 3 days which "appears to come from just one area in the Southwestern United States, meaning it is just a small subset of the total volume of people's location information available to the agency."

=== Nejwa Ali controversy ===
The DHS came under fire from pro-Israel politicians in October 2023 for employing Nejwa Ali, who supported Hamas following its deadly terror attack against Israel. Her social media posts were first reported on by the Daily Wire and the Washington Examiner reported on Ali being placed on administrative leave.

=== Subpoenas of activists ===
During the ongoing protests against mass deportation during the second Trump administration, several subpoenas were sent by the DHS to request personal information of social media accounts belonging to several users who had expressed views that were critical of ICE or were related to the protests against mass deportation. Some of these subpoenas were withdrawn upon court filings to challenge them.

=== Surveillance ===
==== ICE ====
American Dragnet, a report from the Center on Privacy and Technology, documents the scope of ICE's surveillance capabilities. The report found that ICE has access to the driver's license data of 3 in 4 adults, could locate 3 in 4 adults through their utility records and tracks the movements of drivers in cities home to 3 in 4 adults. The report also said "the agency spent approximately $2.8 billion between 2008 and 2021 on new surveillance, data collection and data-sharing initiatives". ICE has also used data brokers to circumvent laws restricting government bodies sharing information with ICE. ICE has reportedly been a customer of Paragon Solutions and confirmed its use of Clearview AI. Additionally, ICE has reportedly used Mobile Fortify, ShadowDragon, Zignal Labs, the network of Flock Safety, Magnetic Forensics, and products from Pen-Link, LexisNexis and Booz Allen Hamilton.

The second Trump administration reportedly worked to obtain and centralize data on Americans as outlined in Executive Order 14243 relying heavily on products from Palantir Technologies. This data has been desired to support expanded deportation efforts and to target political opponents and civil society. The administration has sought data from the IRS, Medicaid and Supplemental Nutrition Assistance Program. ICE has also received data from within DHS including from the TSA.

==== Office of Intelligence and Analysis ====
The Office of Intelligence and Analysis (I&A) has a history of problematic surveillance. In 2020, the I&A authorized "collecting and reporting on various activities in the context of elevated threats targeting monuments, memorials, and statues". The office surveilled protestors at the George Floyd protests in Portland, Oregon In September 2023, Congress considered revoking some of the agency's collection authorities over concerns about overreach. According to Politico, "a key theme that emerges from internal documents is that in recent years, many people working at I&A have said they fear they are breaking the law". In 2025, sexual orientation and gender identity were removed from I&A's list of characteristics that "personnel are prohibited from engaging in intelligence activities based solely on".

=== Masking and unidentifiability ===
ICE has repeatedly acted in ways that are difficult for the public to identify. This includes using unmarked vehicles, wearing masks, omission of name tags and refusal to provide clear proof of authority. As a result, several states are attempting to pass a federal law called the VISIBLE Act, which would restrict law enforcement officers from concealing their identities.

=== Warrants ===
The Department of Homeland Security has repeatedly acted without a warrant.

=== State terror ===
Department of Homeland Security actions including Operation Metro Surge have been described as state terror.

=== Order to detain legal refugees ===
February 2026 memo "Detention of Refugees Who Have Failed to Adjust to Lawful Permanent Resident Status"

The Department of Homeland Security's policy of detaining refugees who failed adjustment of status has been criticized. A May 2010 directive "clarifies when and under what circumstances" refugees who have failed to adjust status may be detained. The second Trump administration rescinded the 2010 directive.

=== Oversight ===
The second Trump administration reportedly closed multiple DHS oversight agencies including the Office for Civil Rights and Civil Liberties, the Office of the Immigration Detention Ombudsman, and the Office of the Citizenship and Immigration Services Ombudsman. Spokesperson Tricia McLaughlin said the offices had been "undermining D.H.S.’s mission". DHS's acting General Counsel Joseph Mazzara said "This whole program sounds like money laundering (...) We should look into civil RICO charges". According to court records reviewed by The Guardian, "thousands of cases related to conditions in immigration detention, deaths in custody and officers’ use of force are not being investigated".

=== Elections ===
In March 2026, President Trump signed Executive Order 14399 which directs the Department of Homeland Security "to compile and transmit" a "State Citizenship List", "a list of individuals confirmed to be United States citizens who will be above the age of 18 at the time of an upcoming Federal election and who maintain a residence in" each state.

== See also ==
- Awards and decorations of the United States Department of Homeland Security
- Container Security Initiative
- E-Verify
- Electronic System for Travel Authorization
- Emergency Management Institute
- Fictional Department of Homeland Security personnel
- History of homeland security in the United States
- Homeland Security USA
- Homeland security grant
- Home Office, equivalent department in the United Kingdom
- List of state departments of homeland security
- National Biodefense Analysis and Countermeasures Center (NBACC), Ft Detrick, MD
- National Interoperability Field Operations Guide
- National Strategy for Homeland Security
- Project Hostile Intent
- Public Safety Canada, equivalent department in Canada
- Shadow Wolves
- Terrorism in the United States
- United States visas
