= National Interoperability Field Operations Guide =

The National Interoperability Field Operations Guide (NIFOG) is a technical reference for emergency communication planning and for radio technicians responsible for radios that will be used in disaster response.

The Office of Emergency Communications (OEC) was established by Congress through the Fiscal Year 2007 Appropriations Act as a response to communication challenges faced during the September 11, 2001 attacks and Hurricane Katrina.

During each of these events, the lack of coordinated emergency communication solutions and protocols among the responding agencies hindered response and recovery efforts. These events raised awareness of the issue among public policymakers and highlighted the critical role emergency communications plays in incident response.

The first version of the NIFOG was published in September 2007. It was developed in partnership with the Department of Homeland Security’s Office of the Chief Information Officer’s Spectrum Management Office to assist Federal and non-Federal agencies and potential users of the mutual aid channels.

The NIFOG contains sections on:

- Regulations and guidelines for national interoperability
- Tables of nationwide interoperability channels and frequencies
- Common communications references
- Tables of commonly used frequencies for emergencies and disasters
- Aviation, MURS, GMRS, FRS, CB, railroad, SAR and marine frequencies
- Amateur emergency, calling and repeater frequencies
- GETS and Satellite Phone dialing instructions

It also includes an organized listing of the national mutual aid channels and other reference material.

The guide is a popular reference among preppers, survivalists, licensed amateur radio operators and owners of radio scanners. The frequencies allow them to gather intelligence and monitor emergency services, government agencies, and emergency amateur radio frequencies during and after a disaster.

The current version is 2.02 and was issued in January 2025. It can be ordered online, downloaded as a PDF or loaded into a mobile device.
