= United States Federal Protective Service =

US Federal law enforcement agency

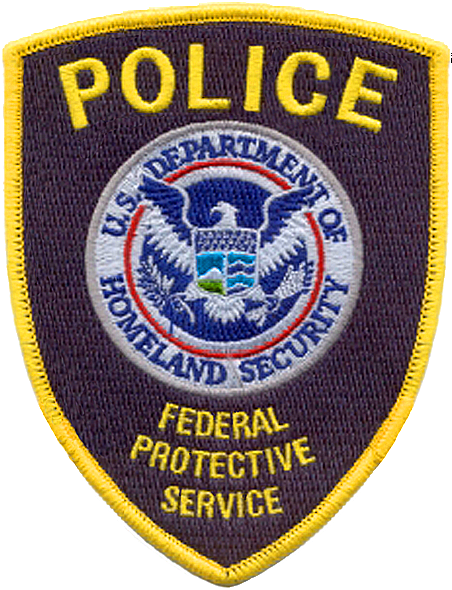
- Patch of the FPS

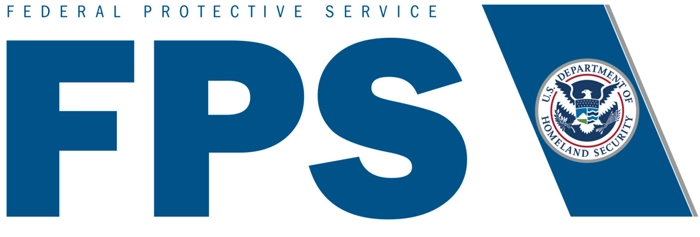
- The racing stripe logo of the FPS

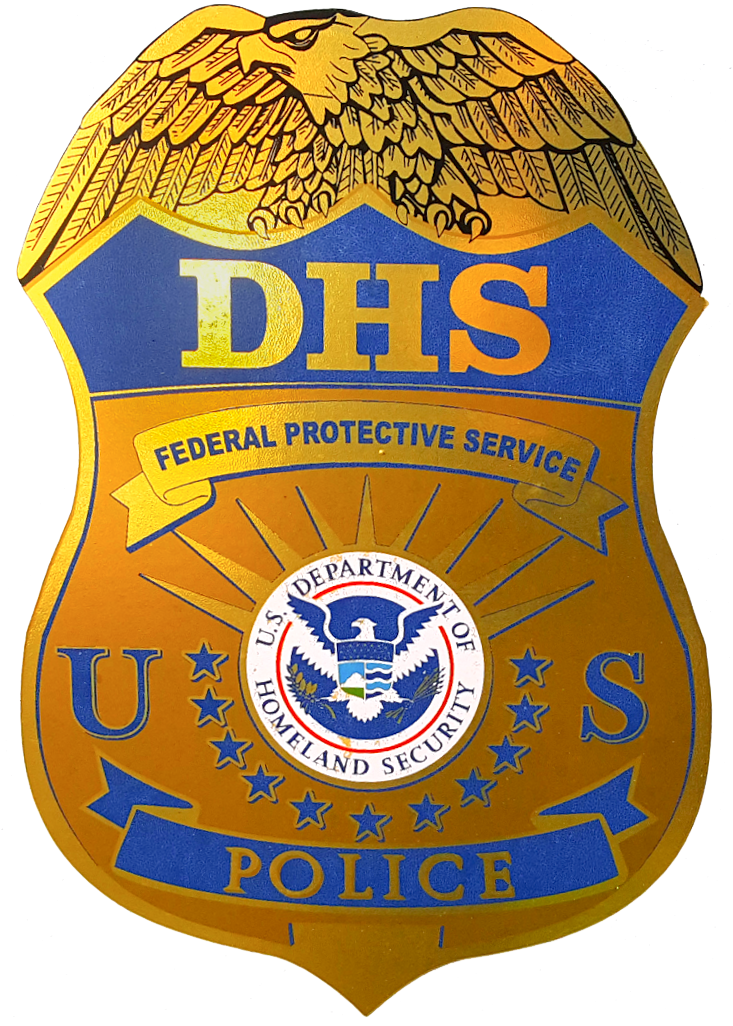
- Badge of a Federal Protective Service officer

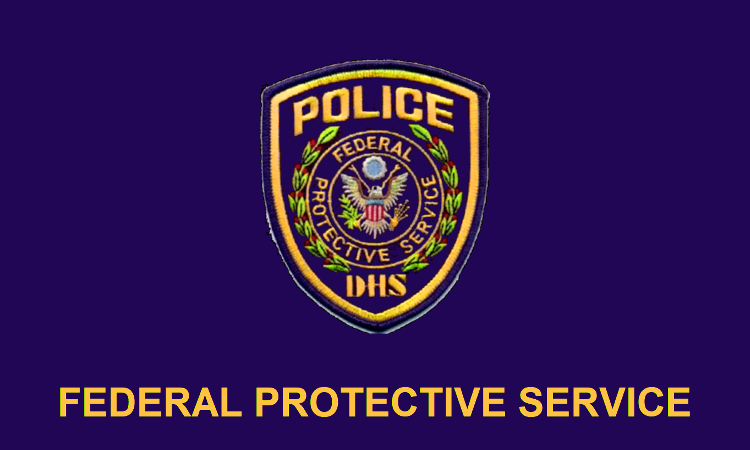
- Flag of the United States Federal Protective Service
- Common name: Federal Protective Service
- Abbreviation: FPS
- Motto: "Service, Integrity, Honor, Vigilance"

Agency overview
- Formed: January 1971; 55 years ago
- Employees: 1,400
- Annual budget: $2 billion (est.) (2025)

Jurisdictional structure
- Federal agency (Operations jurisdiction): United States
- Operations jurisdiction: United States
- Legal jurisdiction: Throughout the United States, 11 regions nationwide, U.S. government law enforcement interests
- Governing body: United States government
- Constituting instrument: 40 U.S. Code § 1315
- General nature: Federal law enforcement

Operational structure
- Headquarters: Washington, D.C., U.S.
- Sworn members: 900 enforcement personnel
- Agency executive: Faron K. Paramore, Director
- Parent agency: DHS Management Directorate

Website
- Official website

The United States Federal Protective Service (FPS), commonly referred to as the Federal Police, is a federal law enforcement agency of the United States Department of Homeland Security (DHS). The Federal Protective Service is also the federal agency charged with protecting and delivering integrated law enforcement, investigative, and security services to federal property, critical infrastructure, federal employees, and large scale public events. This responsibility is perhaps the most public-facing role, however, it is just one of many law enforcement responsibilities entrusted to the agents of FPS.

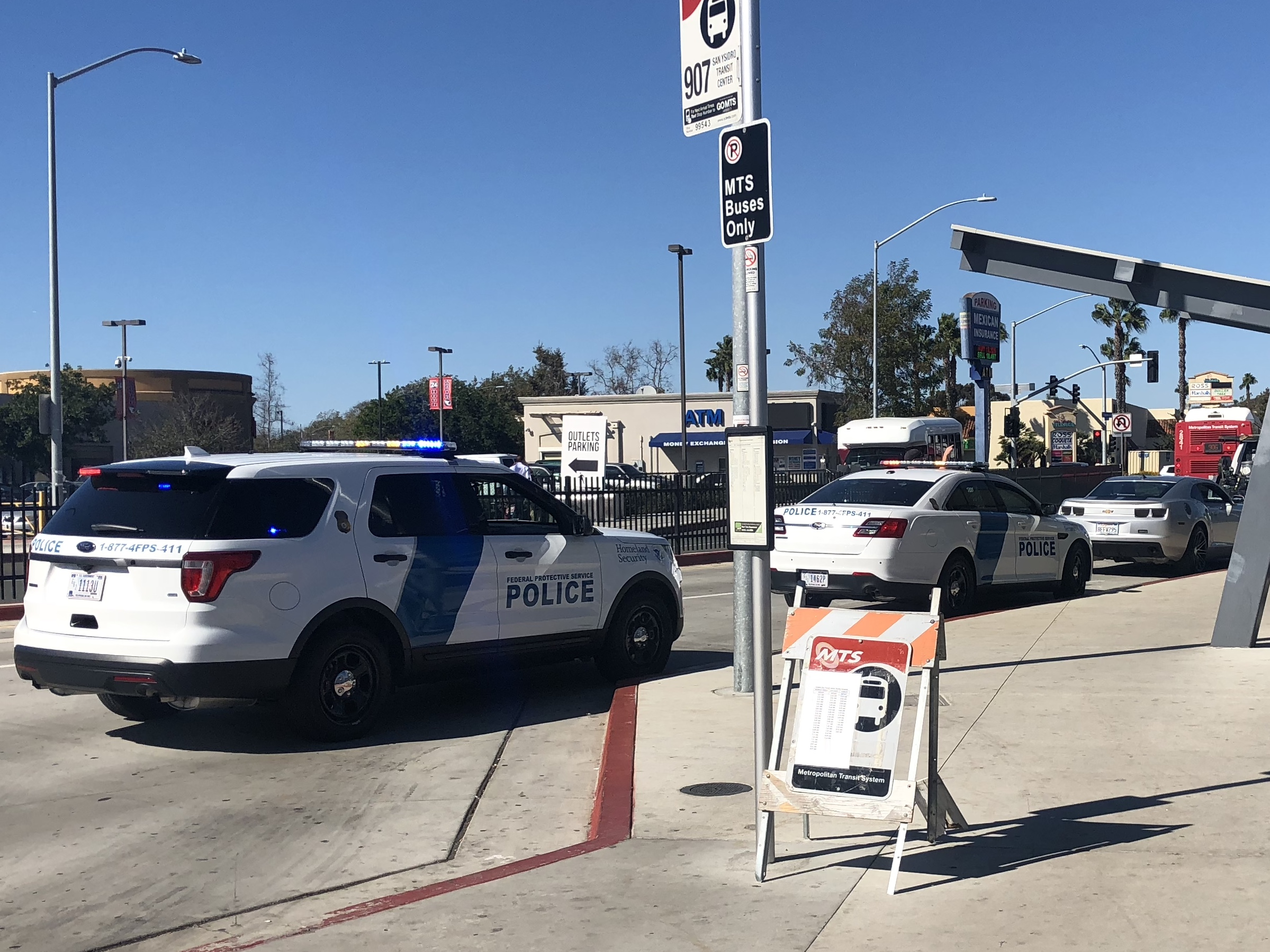
FPS officers conducting a traffic stop

FPS is a federal law enforcement agency which employs approximately 900 law enforcement officers who receive their initial training at the Federal Law Enforcement Training Center (FLETC). New FPS law enforcement personnel receive over 26 weeks of training at FLETC, making the FPS training program the longest program at FLETC. Following FLETC graduation, new FPS law enforcement agents go through an additional 12-week field training and evaluation program. This ensures that FPS personnel are prepared for any situation they may encounter, as most FPS Inspectors and Agents cover large geographic areas without immediate assistance.

FPS also enters into memorandums of understanding with other federal, local, and state law enforcement agencies to further the agency’s mandate of promoting homeland security. Most FPS inspectors and agents are cross-designated to uphold state and local laws with a nexus to federal interests.

FPS provides integrated law enforcement and security services to U.S. federal buildings, courthouses, and other properties administered by the General Services Administration (GSA) and the DHS.

In support of this mission, FPS contracts with private security firms to provide a further 13,000 armed protective security officers (PSO) providing access control and security response within federal buildings. These PSOs are not federal law enforcement officers but private security employees trained by FPS. FPS also protects non-GSA properties as authorized and carries out various other activities for the promotion of homeland security as the Secretary of Homeland Security may prescribe, to include providing a uniformed police response to National Special Security Events, and national disasters.

The FPS was a part of Immigration and Customs Enforcement until October 2009, when it was transferred to the National Protection and Programs Directorate. As part of the NPPD's transformation into the Cybersecurity and Infrastructure Security Agency, the FPS was further moved to the department's Management Directorate.

== Description ==
The Federal Protective Service is a branch of the Management Directorate and a component of the DHS, functioning as the police force of the Secretary of Homeland Security.

FPS law enforcement personnel are divided into three categories: Police Officers (0083 job series), Inspectors (1801 job series), and Special Agents (1811 job series). The FPS Inspectors hold a unique federal law enforcement position and are tasked with many overlapping duties that would generally be carried out by uniformed police and investigators at other agencies. The Inspectors are uniquely qualified to perform law enforcement, physical security, threat mitigation, and investigative duties.

FPS has several special operations divisions which include the Weapons of Mass Destruction Coordinators (hazmat technicians assigned as regional subject-matter experts), Explosive-Detection K9 Teams, the Rapid Protection Force, Bicycle Team, Covert Security Testing team, and the Threat Management Branch.

FPS officers, inspectors, and special agents respond to calls for assistance, conduct investigations and provide crime prevention tips, as well as assist in emergency planning by the departments and agencies occupying the buildings for which the agency is responsible.

All federal facilities under FPS control receive a thorough building security assessment on a recurring schedule. During this assessment representatives of all agencies in the facility are interviewed to gather information on the specific mission they perform within the facility, and intelligence and crime statistics for the area are reviewed, as are existing security countermeasures. Based on the findings and working with the agencies housed in the facility, security countermeasures are added or adjusted. This allows for tailored security for each individual facility versus a one-size-fits-all approach.

== Role ==
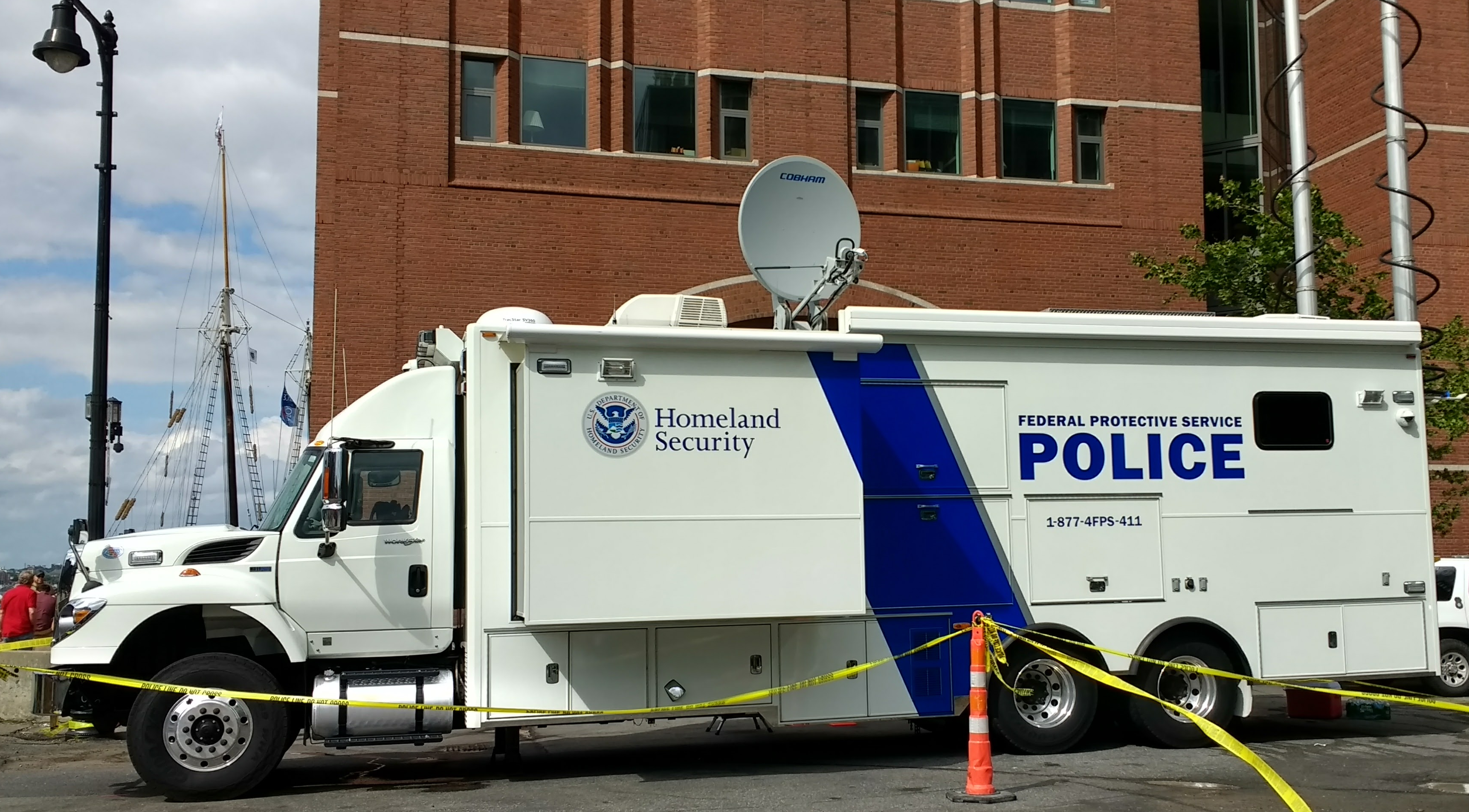
An FPS communications vehicle protecting the John Joseph Moakley United States Courthouse during Sail Boston 2017.

=== Primary protective services ===
- Conducting facility security assessments
- Designing countermeasures for tenant agencies
- Maintaining uniformed law enforcement presence
- Maintaining armed contract security guards
- Performing background suitability checks for contract employees
- Monitoring security alarms via centralized communication centers

=== Additional protective services ===
- Conducting criminal investigations
- Sharing intelligence among local/state/federal agencies
- Protecting special events
- Working with FEMA to respond to natural disasters
- Offering special operations including K-9 explosive detection
- Training federal tenants in crime prevention and Occupant Emergency Planning

== Training ==
Newly hired sworn FPS law enforcement personnel attend a uniform police training program for 13 weeks, followed by FPS add on training for an additional 13 weeks at the Federal Law Enforcement Training Center location in Glynco, Georgia. Furthermore, following graduation, new FPS law enforcement officers undergo additional post academy training, as well as career-continuous training, and are assigned to an FPS office in one of eleven regions throughout the country. FPS law enforcement officers also undergo additional training, depending on their assignment to special units within the service.

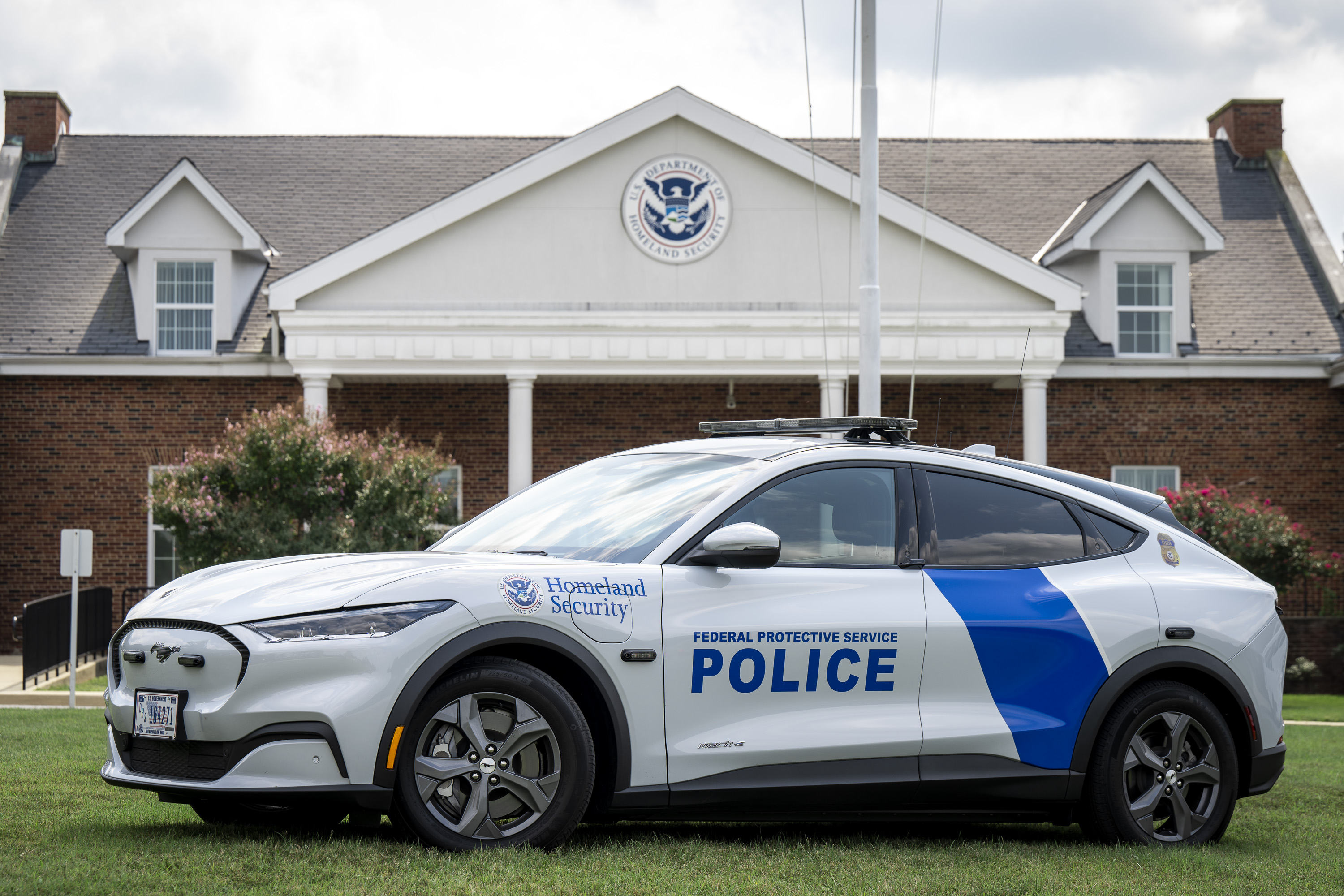
An FPS Ford Mustang Mach-E patrol vehicle

== History ==
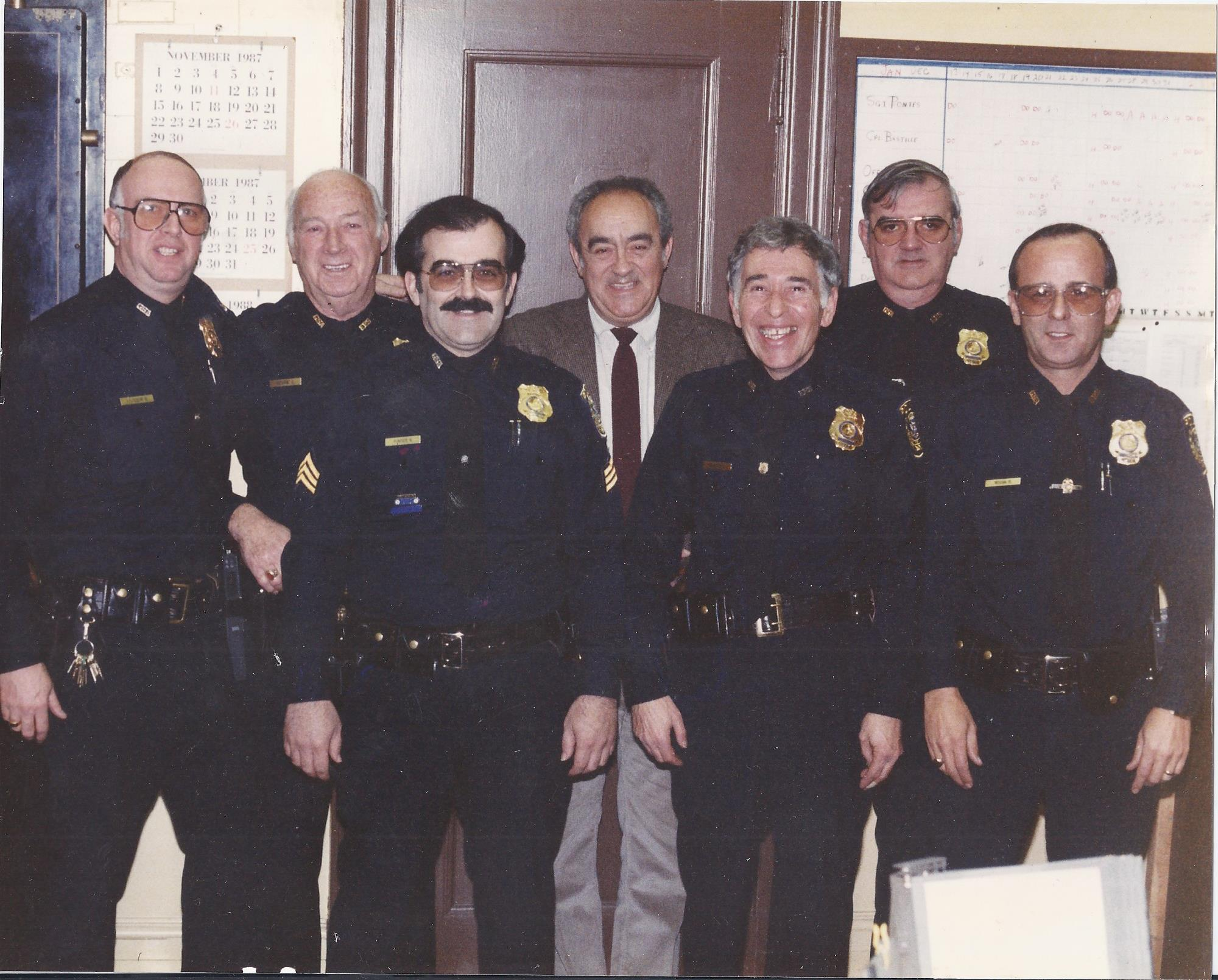
Policemen of the GSA-era FPS from the Providence office in 1987

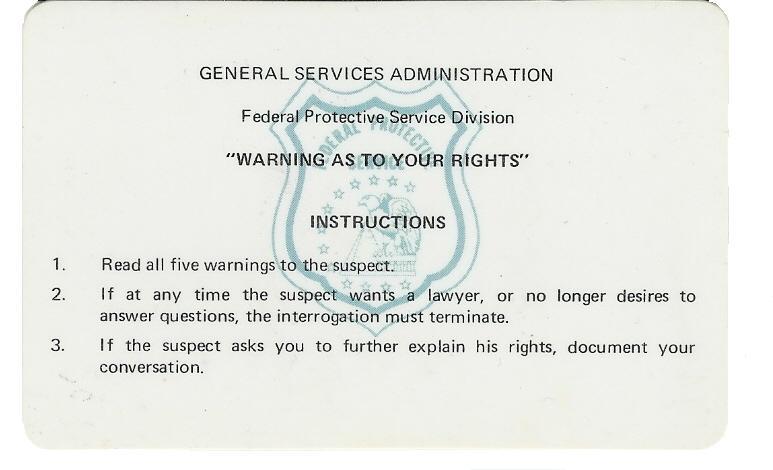
Miranda warning card issued to FPS officers in the 1980s

Policewoman of the GSA-era FPS standing next to her cruiser in Texas, 1990.

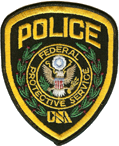
Former FPS patch, when it was part of the GSA

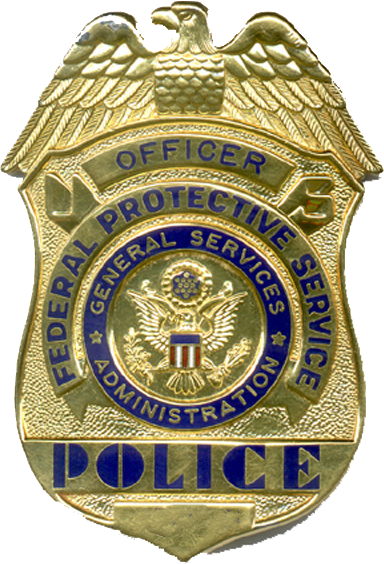
Former FPS badge, when it was part of the GSA

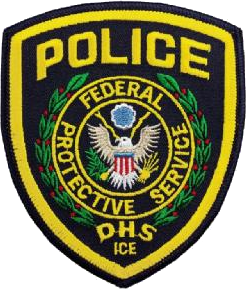
Former FPS patch, when it was part of ICE

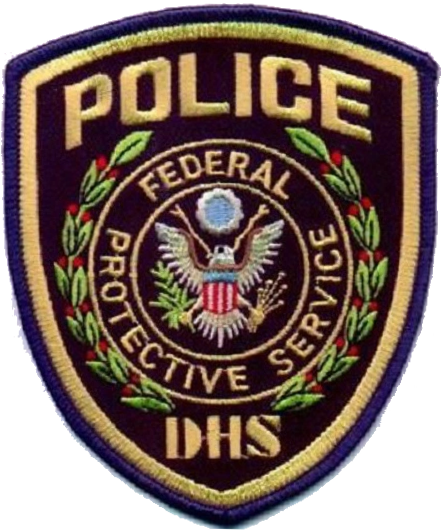
Federal Protective Service's former patch, used before 2008.

The origins of FPS date to 1790 (a year after the US Marshals Service), with the enactment of the Residence Act, authorizing President George Washington to appoint three commissioners to create a federal territory for a permanent seat of federal government. Prior to the formal establishment of Washington and the District of Columbia, commissioners hired six night watchmen to protect designated buildings the government was intended to occupy. FPS traces its origins to the appointment of these six night watchmen.

FPS has resided in a number of different agencies over the years. The act of June 1, 1948, authorized the federal administrator to appoint special policemen for duty in connection with the policing of all buildings owned and occupied by the United States. In 1949, Congress enacted the Federal Property and Administrative Services Act of 1949, which consolidated real property functions within the newly created GSA. The FPS force, known at the time as the United States Special Police, came under the supervision of the Protection Division of the Public Building Service. In 1971, the Administrator of GSA signed an order formally establishing the Federal Protective Force, later known as FPS, and the Civil Service Commission authorized the special classification title of federal protective officer.

Initially, the main function of FPS was protection, as an integral part of building operations. For the most part, the force held fixed posts and performed duties that would be considered safety functions today, such as: eliminating fire and safety hazards, patrolling buildings, detecting fires, and providing the first line of defense in fighting fires; and answering visitor questions, assisting citizens, rendering first aid, and directing traffic when necessary. By 1960, the mission of FPS had become the first line of defense against bomb threats, bombings, vandalism, mass demonstrations, and violence against Federal buildings.

In 1980, Fidel Castro instigated a wave of emigration from Cuba to the United States using the harbor town of Mariel for debarkation. The thousands of refugees were eventually distributed to military installations in several states (Fort Chaffee, AR, Fort McCoy, WI, Fort Indiantown Gap, PA) and Puerto Rico to await permanent resettlement. The Immigration and Naturalization Service and Border Patrol were understaffed to provide civilian law enforcement officers needed to maintain order within the installations. The Federal Protective Service, then administratively placed under the General Service Administration's Public Building Service, was among several federal authorities asked to provide additional on-site officers for the duration of the event. Federal Protective Officers from across the country frequently served in the camps, and also during the riot at Fort Chaffee.

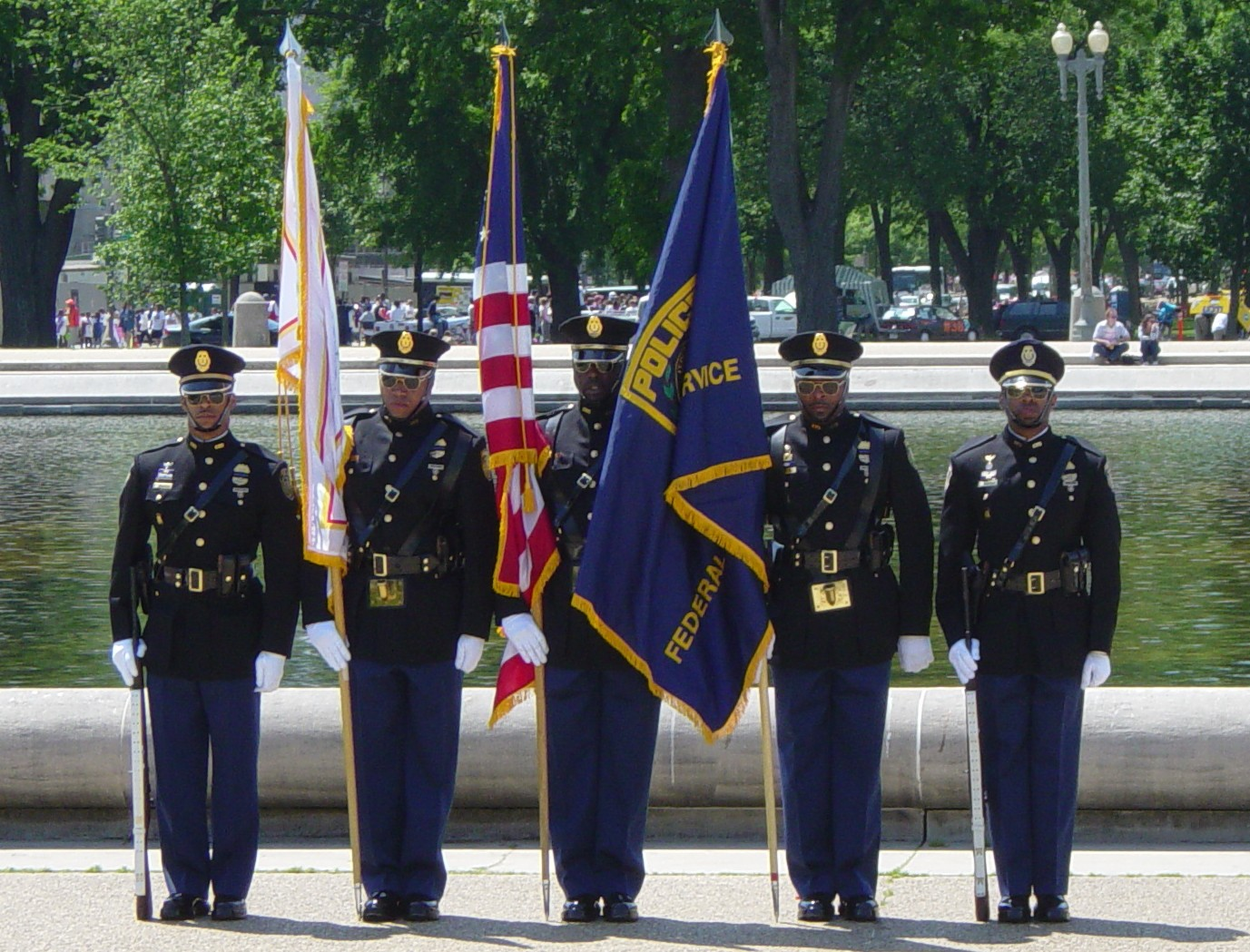
United States Federal Protective Service color guard

More recently, the role of the FPS officer has undergone further changes. The FPS has shifted its emphasis from the fixed guard post concept of security to a mobile police patrol and response. FPS contracts private security companies to guard fixed posts. FPS officers perform all duties attendant to the normal interpretation of a police officer function including maintaining law and order, preventing or deterring disturbances, and investigating both felonies and misdemeanors. The Civil Service Commission developed standards for FPS applicants, which included background investigations, and physical examinations.

Officers of the Federal Protective Service arrested civil rights movement historian Randy Kryn and 10 others who were protesting in a demonstration at the Kluczynski Federal Building in downtown Chicago during the 1996 Democratic National Convention.

=== 21st century ===
Pursuant to the Homeland Security Act of 2002, FPS was transferred to the Department of Homeland Security and retained its responsibilities for protecting the buildings, grounds, and property owned, occupied, or secured by the federal government under GSA's jurisdiction. In addition to GSA facilities, the Act also provides FPS with the authority to protect properties held by DHS components that were not under GSA jurisdiction. FPS was moved from GSA, Public Building Services, to DHS, effective March 1, 2003. Within DHS, FPS became a part of U.S. Immigration and Customs Enforcement (ICE). On October 28, 2009, President Barack Obama signed legislation that transferred FPS from ICE to the National Protection and Programs Directorate (NPPD) of the U.S. Department of Homeland Security. Today, FPS is responsible for policing, securing, and ensuring a safe environment in which federal agencies can conduct business by reducing threats posed against approximately 9,000 federal government facilities throughout the United States.

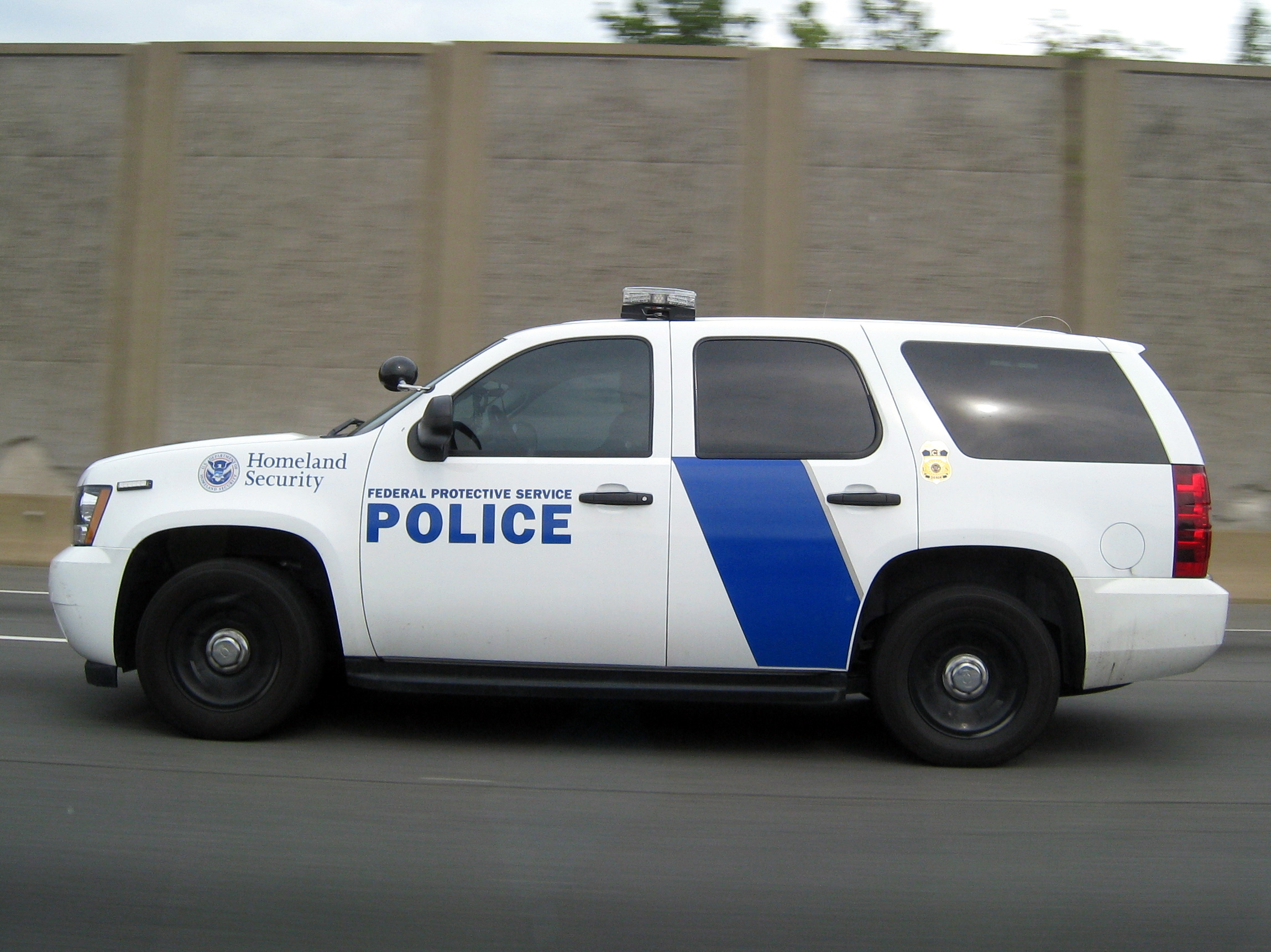
An FPS Chevrolet Tahoe SUV seen in 2010. An ICE shield is included in this vehicle's livery

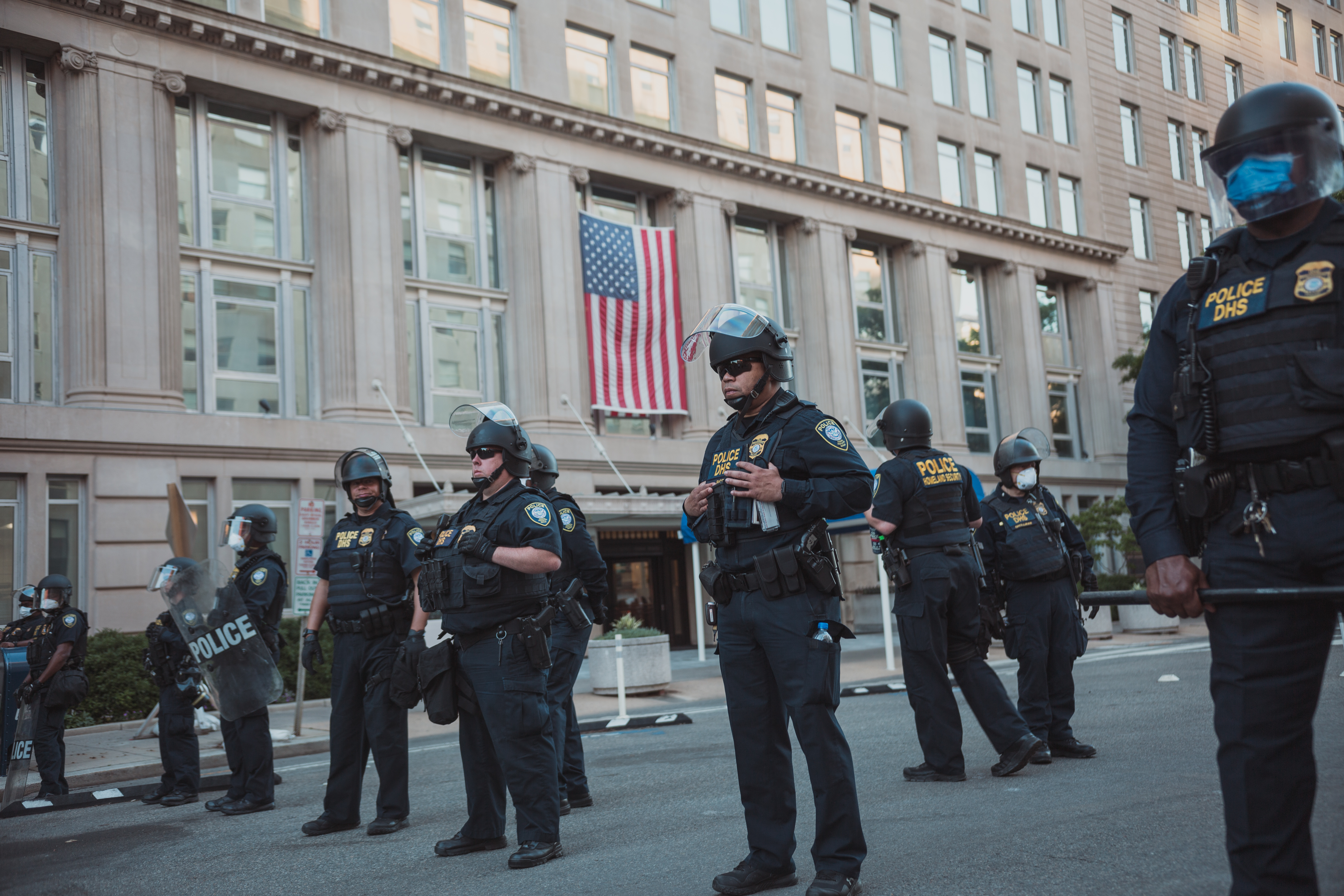
FPS officers in riot gear in 2020

On December 26, 2007, President George W. Bush signed H.R. 2764 Omnibus spending bill into law which included a provision that FPS maintains, by July 31, 2008, not fewer than 1,200 full-time staff and 900 full-time Police Officers, Inspectors, and Special Agents who, while working, are directly engaged on a daily basis protecting and enforcing laws at Federal buildings. This amendment to H.R. 2674 was introduced by Senator Hillary Rodham Clinton and was successfully included in the bill and signed into law largely due to the efforts of the American Federation of Government Employees Local 918-FPS and the grassroots efforts of its membership.

In March 2008, Del. Eleanor Holmes Norton, chair of the responsible House of Representatives subcommittee, said, "We're seeing the near collapse of the Federal Protective Service". A GAO report, which included incidents that occurred before H.R. 2764 passed, documented lapses that had occurred on federal government property, including the theft of a trailer of surveillance equipment from an FBI parking deck. A GAO investigator said that budget cuts were causing reduced effectiveness. The service has seen its budget and staff cut since it became a part of the Department of Homeland Security in March 2003.

In 2009, the Government Accountability Office (GAO) and the Inspector General for the Department of Homeland Security issued reports that were highly critical of the Federal Protective Service for relying on low-wage contract personnel to provide security at federal buildings. See GAO-09-0859T and OIG-09-51. Both documented that the contractors lacked the necessary skills or training to handle their duties, which threatened the security of all federal employees and visitors. The GAO report made national headlines in July 2009 as it cited frequent lapses, including failure to prevent investigators from carrying weapons into several key federal installations. It also displayed a photograph of a contract security guard asleep at his guard post.

On June 17, 2019, a lone gunman by the name of Brian Issack Clyde opened fire on the Earle Cabell Federal Building and Courthouse in Dallas, Texas. Since FPS officers are charged with protecting federal courthouses, they were present at the shooting. Three FPS officers engaged the shooter, fatally wounding him.

On May 30, 2020, Dave Patrick Underwood, a contract security officer for the Federal Protective Service, was shot and killed in Oakland, California. The attack occurred amid the George Floyd protests, which broke out into unrest in Oakland. Two suspects, one of whom had killed a Santa Cruz County deputy in a subsequent attack on police, were arrested in June; they were found to have had ties to the far-right boogaloo movement.

Starting in July 2020, the Federal Protective Service was the main agency involved in the deployment of federal forces to the city of Portland, Oregon. These forces included many officers from other agencies, but they acted under the jurisdiction of FPS. Their operations centered around the two downtown Portland federal buildings on 3rd Ave, and the ICE building in South Waterfront.

== Jurisdiction ==
FPS law enforcement personnel derive their law enforcement authority from Section 1315 of Title 40 of the United States Code (40 USC 1315):

The Secretary may designate employees of the Department of Homeland Security, including employees transferred to the Department from the Office of the Federal Protective Service of the General Services Administration pursuant to the Homeland Security Act of 2002, as officers and agents for duty in connection with the protection of property owned or occupied by the Federal Government and persons on the property, including duty in areas outside the property to the extent necessary to protect the property and persons on the property.

Powers.—While engaged in the performance of official duties, an officer or agent designated under this subsection may—

(A) enforce Federal laws and regulations for the protection of persons and property;

(B) carry firearms;

(C) make arrests without a warrant for any offense against the United States committed in the presence of the officer or agent or for any felony cognizable under the laws of the United States if the officer or agent has reasonable grounds to believe that the person to be arrested has committed or is committing a felony;

(D) serve warrants and subpoenas issued under the authority of the United States;

(E) conduct investigations, on and off the property in question, of offenses that may have been committed against property owned or occupied by the Federal Government or persons on the property; and

(F) carry out such other activities for the promotion of homeland security as the Secretary may prescribe.

== Labor organization ==
The American Federation of Government Employees (AFGE) National Local 918 is the exclusive representative of all bargaining unit eligible Federal Protective Service employees which include non-supervisory Police Officers, Inspectors, Special Agents and support personnel. Citation: AFGE NL#918

== Protective Investigations Program ==
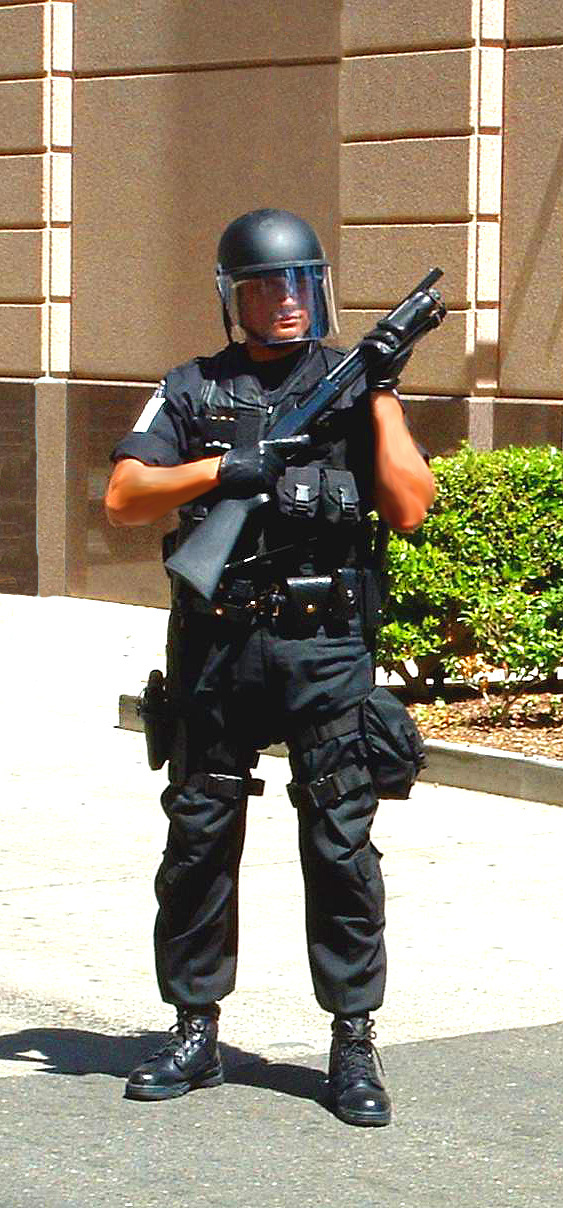
A U.S. Federal Protective Service officer in 2003, equipped with full tactical gear and a shotgun

The Protective Investigations Program was established in early 2004, to ensure the safety of DHS and FPS protectees and facilities. The objective of the program is to prevent an attack on persons and facilities designated as FPS protectees.

The program integrates the following aspects of the FPS mission: the initial patrol response by FPS uniformed police officers; full investigation by FPS special agents; prosecution by the U.S. Attorney's Office or State Prosecutor's Office; physical security enhancements and countermeasures; security briefings and workplace violence seminars administered by FPS law enforcement personnel; suspicious surveillance detection initiatives designed to detect pre-incident indicators of threats to federal employees, facilities and protectees; a monthly Operations Security Bulletin; and protection details for high-ranking officials within DHS. FPS Headquarters developed a Memorandum of Understanding, in collaboration with the U.S. Capitol Police, enabling the two entities to use each other's resources to effectively, efficiently and professionally respond to and investigate threats and inappropriate communications directed at members of Congress, their families and staff when outside the Washington, D.C., metropolitan area.

FPS collaborates with other components within DHS and has established liaisons with agencies having a protective and investigative mission such as the U.S. Secret Service—National Threat Assessment Center, Social Security Administration (SSA), U.S. Marshals Service, FBI, U.S. Postal Inspection Service and various state and local police agencies throughout the country.

FPS special agents have made arrests and conducted investigations of subjects charged with making inappropriate communications and threats to members of the U.S. Congress (House and Senate) or their staff, the director of Federal Emergency Management Agency, FPS Director, members of the military reserve, SSA, the Department of Veteran Affairs and other federal employees. Many of these investigations resulted in convictions for making threats to do physical harm and threats to bomb federal facilities. FPS special agents investigated threats delivered in person, via telephone, e-mail and U.S. Postal Service mail.

FPS special agents also oversee an outreach program designed to educate the community and tenant agencies and provide them with a point of contact to report suspicious behavior and incidents that threaten FPS protectees, facilities, or visitors.

== Explosive Detection Dog Teams ==
The mission of the Explosive Detector Dog (EDD) Teams is the protection of life and property and providing a strong visible and psychological deterrent against criminal and terrorist acts. Prior to the terrorist attacks of September 11, 2001, the FPS had a minimal program of 10 EDD Teams located in the Washington, D.C., metropolitan area. Since that time, the FPS EDD program has expanded to more than 60 teams nationwide.

The EDD Teams conduct routine explosive searches of office areas, vehicles, materials, packages and persons housed in federally owned or leased facilities. The EDD Teams respond to bomb threats and suspicious packages or items and are used to assist in clearing identified areas.

=== Deployment ===
The FPS EDD Teams are deployed in their area of assignment as well as frequent deployment to National Special Security Events such as the Olympic games, the Republican and Democratic National Conventions, and the G-8 Summit. The EDD Teams provide their vital capabilities to state and local law enforcement authorities under emergency conditions when local EDD Teams are unavailable.

=== Training ===
The FPS Canine Training Academy is located in San Antonio, Texas, and is conducted in partnership with the Transportation Security Administration Canine Detection Training Center. Each handler and respective canine attends the mandatory 12-week EDD Handler Training Course. The handlers and their canine partners graduate from the course as a team.

On call 24 hours a day, EDD teams serve a crucial role as part of a greater network of first responders and federal task force officers.

== WMD/CBRNE Program ==
The FPS Weapons of Mass Destruction/CBRNE Response program was created to support the mission of FPS in response to credible chemical, biological, radiological and nuclear (CBRNE) threats or incidents.

Each DHS region is protected by a WMD/CBRNE Coordinator and several CBRNE Technicians. These individuals are trained and certified to at least the NFPA Hazardous Materials Technician level. Their duties include investigations of suspicious or threatening CBRNE incidents; completion of CBRNE threat assessments; confirmations of unauthorized presence of CBRNE agents and materials; and the conduction of emergency operations. WMD/CBRNE also provides: evacuation support during CBRNE incidents and some training assistance. The program is compliant with OSHA and NFPA guidance and regulations. CBRNE personnel are often called to assist with other agencies at the state and local level and are a vital part of DHS’ counterterrorism mission.

== Mega Centers ==
In 2000, FPS transitioned all alarm monitoring and dispatching capabilities from several regional control centers to four MegaCenters. Currently, each MegaCenter monitors multiple types of alarm systems, closed-circuit television, and wireless dispatch communications within federal facilities throughout the entire nation. The centers located in Battle Creek, Michigan; Denver, Colorado; and Philadelphia, Pennsylvania, are equipped with state-of-the-art communication systems and in operation 24 hours a day, 7 days a week.

== See also ==
- Federal law enforcement in the United States
- United States Border Patrol
- Federal Bureau of Investigation
- FBI Police
- Diplomatic Security Service
- U.S. Customs and Border Protection
- United States Marshals Service
