= DHS Management Directorate =

U.S. government body support agency

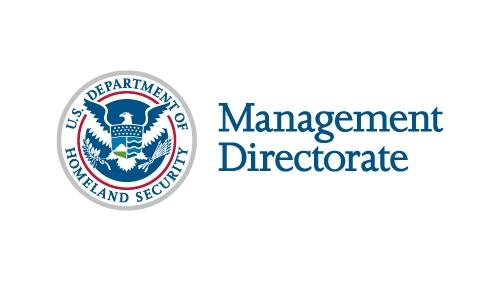

Agency overview
- Formed: 2003
- Jurisdiction: United States
- Headquarters: DHS Nebraska Avenue Complex, Washington D.C.
- Employees: 3,962 (FY 2021)
- Annual budget: $3.2 billion (FY 2021)
- Agency executive: Benjamine Huffman, Acting Under Secretary
- Parent agency: Department of Homeland Security
- Website: DHS Management Directorate

The Management Directorate (MGMT) is a component within the United States Department of Homeland Security. DHS-MGMT serves as the central administrative support organization of the department as it fulfills its national security mission.

The Management Directorate is led by the under secretary of homeland security for management, who is appointed by the president of the United States with confirmation by the United States Senate. The position of Under Secretary for Management is currently vacant.

== Overview ==
The Management Directorate is responsible for department-wide administrative support services and oversight for all support functions, including: IT, budget and financial management, procurement and acquisition, human capital, security, and administrative services. The Under Secretary also provides the overarching management structure for the Department to deliver customer services, while eliminating redundancies and reducing support costs in order to more effectively and efficiently run the Department in a unified manner

== Budget ==
DHS Management Directorate Budget, FY20–22 ($ in thousands)
	FY 20 Enacted ^{[4]}	FY 21 Enacted ^{[4]}	FY 22 Request
Operations and Support	1,182,142	1,398,162	1,653,553
Procurement, Construction, and Improvements	381,298	214,795	396,816
Federal Protective Service	1,508,000	1,588,748	1,653,384
Total Budget	3,071,440	3,201,705	3,703,753
