= Office of Homeland Security Situational Awareness =

U.S. Office of Homeland Security Situational Awareness
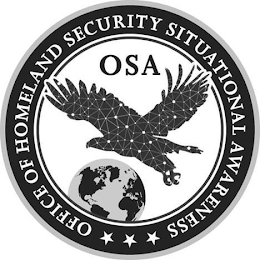
- OSA Logo

Agency overview
- Preceding agency: DHS Office of Operations Coordination
- Jurisdiction: United States of America
- Secretary responsible: Markwayne Mullin, Secretary of Homeland Security
- Deputy Secretary responsible: Troy Edgar, Deputy Secretary of Homeland Security
- Agency executives: Christopher J. Tomney, Director; Frank DiFalco, Deputy Director
- Parent department: U.S. Department of Homeland Security
- Website: https://www.dhs.gov/office-homeland-security-situational-awareness

The Office of Situational Awareness (OSA), formerly Office of Operations Coordination, is a component of the headquarters of the United States Department of Homeland Security. OSA is responsible for ensuring timely and robust information sharing within and external to the Department.

Primarily through the National Operations Center, the Office is a key touchpoint for coordinating operational issues with federal, state, tribal, local governments Homeland Security Advisors, law enforcement partners, and private sector critical infrastructure operators, and international partners. In accordance with Homeland Security Presidential Directive 8 (Annex I), OSA is facilitating a Federal interagency planning effort to address various national contingencies. The Office is headed by RADM (Ret.) Christopher Tomney.

== Purpose ==
Originally the Office of Operations Coordination, the Office of Homeland Security Situational Awareness was established in 2005 with the stated purpose of increasing the Department of Homeland Security's ability to prepare for, prevent, and respond to terrorist attacks and other emergencies and improve coordination and efficiency of operations.

Today, the Office of Homeland Security Situational Awareness has the stated mission of providing situational awareness, a common operating picture, and decision support for the Homeland Security Enterprise on threats, hazards, and events impacting the homeland. Its responsibilities include:

- Provides timely, accurate, and coordinated reporting on significant and upcoming DHS operations, operational responses, policy initiatives, and outreach on emerging threats and intelligence assessments.
- Ensures federal resources are coordinated in support of special events throughout the United States, as appropriate.
- Prepares the DHS Crisis Action Team to augment the National Operations Center during significant events.
- Leads the Department's internal Continuity of Operations and Government Programs and critical infrastructure efforts to enable continuation of primary mission essential functions in the event of a degraded and/or crisis operating environment.

== Operations ==
Information is shared and fused on a daily basis by the two halves of the Office, the "Intelligence Side" and the "Law Enforcement Side". The two halves function in tandem. The Intelligence watch floor gathers intelligence and decides how it contributes to the current threats in a given area. The Law Enforcement Side tracks law enforcement activities across the country that may have a terrorist nexus. This information from the two halves accurately depicts the nation's threat environment at any moment.

Through the National Operations Center, the Office provides real-time situational awareness and monitoring of the homeland, coordinates incidents and response activities, and, in conjunction with the Office of Intelligence and Analysis, issues advisories and bulletins concerning threats to homeland security, as well as specific protective measures. The NOC coordinates information sharing to help deter, detect, and prevent terrorist acts and to manage domestic incidents. Information on domestic incident management is shared with Emergency Operations Centers at all levels through the Homeland Security Information Network (HSIN).

== Organizational Structure ==
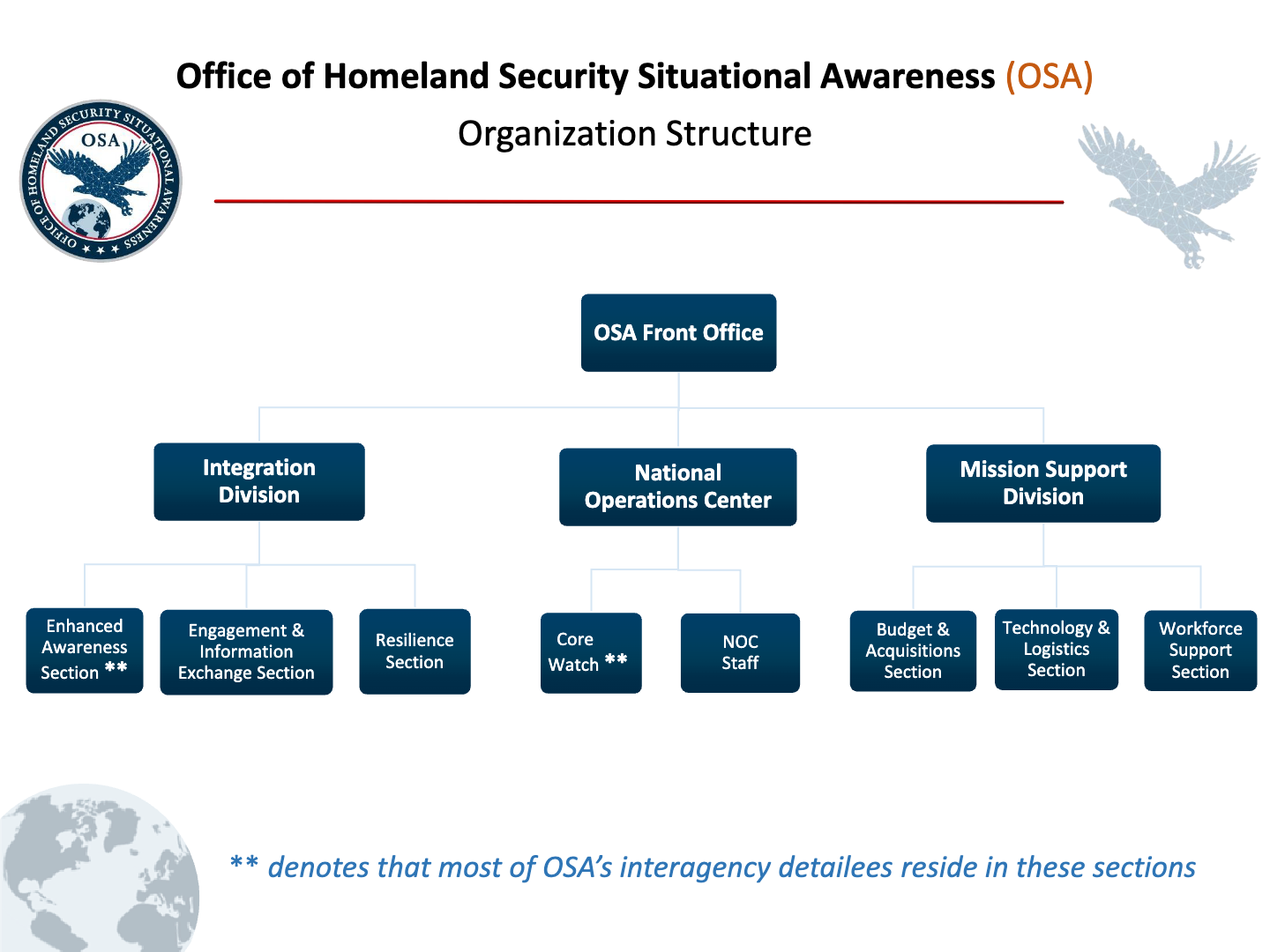
OSA Organizational Chart | June 29, 2021

=== Integration Division ===
The OSA Integration Division contains the Enhanced Awareness Section, the Engagement & Information Exchange Section, and the Resilience Section.

=== Mission Support Division ===
The OSA Mission Support Division contains the Budget & Acquisitions Section, the Technology & Logistics Section, and the Workforce Support Section.

=== National Operations Center ===
The DHS National Operations Center (NOC) operates at all times and serves as the primary, national-level hub for situational awareness, a common operating picture, information fusion, information sharing, and executive communications. The NOC is responsible for:

- Providing timely reporting and products derived from traditional and social media monitoring; DHS Component reporting; federal, state, local, tribal, territorial governments, and sector reports to support senior-leader decision making.
- Providing and maintaining information dissemination tools such as a common operating picture and the Homeland Security Information Network (HSIN) to facilitate information sharing with the federal, state, local, tribal, territorial governments, and private sector professionals.
- Providing executive-level communications capabilities to link senior leaders to facilitate unity of effort and incident management efforts.
