= List of Department of Homeland Security appointments by Donald Trump =

Key
Appointees serving in offices that did not require Senate confirmation.
Appointees confirmed by the Senate.
Appointees awaiting Senate confirmation.
Appointees serving in an acting capacity.
Appointees who have left office or offices which have been disbanded.
Nominees who were withdrawn prior to being confirmed or assuming office.

== Appointments (first administration) ==
Office	Nominee	Assumed office	Left office
Secretary of Homeland Security	Chad Wolf	November 13, 2019	January 11, 2021
Deputy Secretary of Homeland Security	Ken Cuccinelli	November 13, 2019	
General Counsel	Vacant		
Inspector General of Homeland Security	Joseph V. Cuffari	July 25, 2019 (Confirmed July 25, 2019 voice vote)	
Chief Financial Officer of Homeland Security	Troy Edgar	May 14, 2020 (Confirmed May 12, 2020, 62–31)	
Chief Information Officer of Homeland Security	John Zangardi	December 8, 2017 (Appointed November 6, 2017)	
Chief Medical Officer of Homeland Security	Duane C. Caneva	May 2018 (Appointed April 2, 2018)	
Under Secretary of Homeland Security (National Protection and Programs)	Chris Krebs	August 16, 2017	June 15, 2018
Under Secretary of Homeland Security (National Protection and Programs)	Chris Krebs	June 15, 2018 (Confirmed June 12, 2018, voice vote)	November 15, 2018
Assistant Secretary of Homeland Security (Office of Infrastructure Protection)	Vacant		
Under Secretary of Homeland Security (Intelligence and Analysis)	Brian Murphy	May 10, 2020	
Under Secretary of Homeland Security (Management)	Randolph Alles	July 8, 2019	
Assistant Secretary of Homeland Security (Legislative Affairs)	Vacant		
Under Secretary of Homeland Security (Science and Technology)	William N. Bryan	May 30, 2017	
Under Secretary of Homeland Security (Science and Technology)	William N. Bryan	Upon Senate confirmation	
Under Secretary of Homeland Security (Strategy, Policy and Plans)	Chad Wolf	November 13, 2019 (Confirmed November 13, 2019, 54–41)	
Assistant Secretary of Homeland Security (Transportation Security Administration)	David Pekoske	August 10, 2017 (Confirmed August 3, 2017, voice vote)	
Assistant Secretary of Homeland Security (Infrastructure Protection)	Brian Harrell	November 2018	
Federal Emergency Management Agency
Administrator of the Federal Emergency Management Agency	Peter Gaynor	January 16, 2020 (Confirmed January 14, 2020, 81–8)	January 12, 2021
Deputy Administrator of FEMA	Vacant		
Deputy Administrator of FEMA (Protection and National Preparedness)	Vacant		
Assistant Administrator of FEMA (Administration and Grant Programs)	Bridget E. Bean	October 9, 2019 (Appointed August 26, 2019)	
United States Fire Administration
Administrator of the United States Fire Administration	G. Keith Bryant	August 4, 2017 (Appointed May 18, 2017)	
United States Citizenship and Immigration Services
Director of the United States Citizenship and Immigration Services	Mark Koumans	November 18, 2019	February 20, 2020
U.S. Customs and Border Protection
Commissioner of the U.S. Customs and Border Protection	Mark A. Morgan	July 5, 2019	
U.S. Immigration and Customs Enforcement
Director of the U.S. Immigration and Customs Enforcement	Matthew Albence	July 5, 2019	August 25, 2020
United States Secret Service
Director of the Secret Service	James M. Murray	May 1, 2019 (Announced April 8, 2019)	
United States Coast Guard
Commandant of the Coast Guard	Karl L. Schultz	June 1, 2018 (Confirmed May 9, 2018, voice vote)	
Task Force East
Director of the Joint Task Force East	Steven Poulin	June 2020	
Joint Interagency Task Force West
Director of the Joint Interagency Task Force West	Manuel Padilla Jr.	September 2018	
United States Coast Guard Academy
Member of the Board of Visitors to the United States Coast Guard Academy	Michael S. Bruno		
Member of the Board of Visitors to the United States Coast Guard Academy	Stacey Dixon		
Member of the Board of Visitors to the United States Coast Guard Academy	Stephen E. Flynn		
Member of the Board of Visitors to the United States Coast Guard Academy	Erica Schwartz		
Member of the Board of Visitors to the United States Coast Guard Academy	Daniel P. Walsh		

== Previous officeholders (first administration) ==
Office	Name	Took office	Left office	Notes
Secretary of Homeland Security	John F. Kelly	January 20, 2017	July 31, 2017	Resigned to become White House Chief of Staff.
Secretary of Homeland Security	Elaine Duke	July 31, 2017	December 6, 2017	
Secretary of Homeland Security	Kirstjen Nielsen	December 6, 2017	April 10, 2019	President Trump announced via tweet, "Secretary of Homeland Security Kirstjen Nielsen will be leaving her position, and I would like to thank her for her service."
Secretary of Homeland Security	Chad Wolf	November 13, 2019	January 12, 2021	Resigned due to legal challenges to his authority as Acting Secretary of Homeland Security.
Secretary of Homeland Security	Kevin McAleenan	April 11, 2019	November 13, 2019	
Commissioner of U.S. Customs and Border Protection	Kevin McAleenan	January 20, 2017	April 11, 2019	Became Acting Secretary of Homeland Security.
Commissioner of U.S. Customs and Border Protection	John P. Sanders	April 15, 2019	July 5, 2019	Mark Morgan became Acting Commissioner. Congressman Bennie Thompson described DHS leadership as "a constant game of musical chairs".
Deputy Secretary of Homeland Security	Russell Deyo	November 1, 2016	April 4, 2017	
Deputy Secretary of Homeland Security	Elaine Duke	April 10, 2017	April 15, 2018	
Deputy Secretary of Homeland Security	Claire Grady	April 16, 2018	April 10, 2019	Reportedly forced to resign to make way for Kevin McAleenan to become Acting Secretary.
Under Secretary of Homeland Security (Management)	Claire Grady	August 8, 2017	April 10, 2019	Reportedly forced to resign to make way for Kevin McAleenan to become Acting Secretary.
Under Secretary of Homeland Security (Management)	Chip Fulghum	April 10, 2019	July 8, 2019	Became COO of Endeavors.
Deputy Secretary of Homeland Security	David Pekoske	April 11, 2019	November 13, 2019	
Chief of Staff to the Secretary of Homeland Security	Miles Taylor	February 8, 2019	September 2019	Hired by Google in October 2019. In October 2020, Taylor revealed that he is "Anonymous," the author of "I Am Part of the Resistance Inside the Trump Administration" and A Warning. Taylor is a member of the Republican Political Alliance for Integrity and Reform.
Under Secretary of Homeland Security (Intelligence and Analysis)	Robert P. Hayes	March 20, 2017	August 7, 2017	
Under Secretary of Homeland Security (Intelligence and Analysis)	David Glawe	January 23, 2017	March 20, 2017	
Under Secretary of Homeland Security (Intelligence and Analysis)	David Glawe	August 8, 2017	May 9, 2020	Became President and CEO of the National Insurance Crime Bureau
Under Secretary of Homeland Security (Intelligence and Analysis)	Brian Murphy	May 10, 2020	August 2, 2020	On July 31, Acting Secretary Chad Wolf informed Murphy that he would be reassigned after DHS compiled intelligence reports on two journalists. In September, Murphy stated in a whistleblower complaint that his superiors pressured him to alter intelligence reports for political reasons.
Under Secretary of Homeland Security (Strategy, Policy, and Plans)	James Nealon	July 10, 2017	February 8, 2018	
Assistant Secretary of Homeland Security (Legislative Affairs)	Benjamin Cassidy	April 3, 2017	March 20, 2018	
Assistant Secretary of Homeland Security (Counterterrorism and Threat Prevention)	Elizabeth Neumann	February 2017	April 2020	Originally joined Trump administration as deputy chief of staff for DHS Secretary John Kelly. Neumann is a member of the Republican Political Alliance for Integrity and Reform.
Assistant Secretary of Homeland Security (International Affairs)	Valerie Boyd	November 2019	November 13, 2020	Forced out by the White House.
Chief Information Officer of Homeland Security	Richard Staropoli	April 2017	August 2017	
General Counsel of Homeland Security	John Mitnick	March 6, 2018	September 17, 2019	Mitnick is a member of the Republican Political Alliance for Integrity and Reform.
Director of U.S. Immigration and Customs Enforcement	Thomas Homan	January 30, 2017	June 30, 2018	Retired.
Chief of the United States Border Patrol	Ronald Vitiello	February 1, 2017	April 25, 2017	Resigned to become Acting Deputy Commissioner of U.S. Customs and Border Protection.
Deputy Commissioner of U.S. Customs and Border Protection	Ronald Vitiello	April 26, 2017	June 29, 2018	Appointed as the acting director of U.S. Immigration and Customs Enforcement
Director of U.S. Immigration and Customs Enforcement	Ronald Vitiello	June 30, 2018	April 12, 2019	His nomination as Director was withdrawn April 5.
Director of U.S. Immigration and Customs Enforcement	Mark Morgan	May 28, 2019	July 5, 2019	Named Acting Commissioner of CBP
Director of U.S. Immigration and Customs Enforcement	Matthew Albence	April 13, 2019	May 28, 2019	
Director of U.S. Immigration and Customs Enforcement	Matthew Albence	July 5, 2019	August 25, 2020	Retired. The Trump administration never had a Senate-confirmed ICE Director.
Deputy Director of U.S. Immigration and Customs Enforcement	Matthew Albence	August 1, 2018	August 25, 2020	
Administrator of the Federal Emergency Management Agency	Brock Long	June 23, 2017	March 8, 2019	Announced his resignation February 13, effective March 8, 2019, with his deputy, Pete Gaynor, to serve as acting administrator. The Senate confirmed Gaynor on January 14, 2020.
Deputy Administrator for Resilience of the Federal Emergency Management Agency	Daniel Kaniewski	September 14, 2017	January 31, 2020	
Director of the United States Secret Service	Randolph Alles	April 25, 2017	May 1, 2019	Became Acting Under Secretary of Homeland Security for Management in July 2019.
Director of the United States Citizenship and Immigration Services	L. Francis Cissna	October 8, 2017	June 1, 2019	Submitted his resignation at the request of Trump on May 24, 2019, effective June 1.
Director of the United States Citizenship and Immigration Services	Ken Cuccinelli	June 10, 2019	November 13, 2019	Became Acting Deputy Secretary of Homeland Security. In March 2020, Judge Randolph Moss ruled that his appointment as Acting USCIS Director violated the Federal Vacancies Reform Act of 1998.
DHS Inspector General	John V. Kelly	December 1, 2017	July 25, 2019	Retired earlier than planned following revelations that he directed his staff to whitewash audits of DHS performance after federal disasters.
Director of the Cybersecurity and Infrastructure Security Agency	Chris Krebs	November 16, 2018	November 17, 2020	Trump terminated his employment after he disputed Trump's false claims of election fraud regarding the 2020 presidential election.
Deputy Director of the Cybersecurity and Infrastructure Security Agency	Matthew Travis	November 16, 2018	November 17, 2020	Submitted his resignation under pressure from the White House following the firing of Chris Krebs.
Assistant Director for Cybersecurity, CISA	Jeanette Manfra	November 16, 2018	January 8, 2020	Manfra announced on November 21, 2019, that she would leave her position at the end of the year. She became Global Director of Security and Compliance at Google.
Assistant Director for Cybersecurity, CISA	Bryan S. Ware	January 2020	November 13, 2020	Trump requested Ware's resignation.

== Appointments (second administration) ==
Office	Nominee	Assumed office	Left office
Secretary of Homeland Security	Markwayne Mullin	March 24, 2026 (Confirmed March 23, 2026, 54–45)	
Secretary of Homeland Security	Kristi Noem	January 25, 2025 (Confirmed January 25, 2025, 59–34)	March 24, 2026
Secretary of Homeland Security	Benjamine Huffman	January 20, 2025	January 25, 2025
Deputy Secretary of Homeland Security	Troy Edgar	March 8, 2025 (Confirmed March 6, 2025, 53–43)	
Deputy Secretary of Homeland Security	Benjamine Huffman	January 28, 2025	February 4, 2025
Deputy Secretary of Homeland Security	MaryAnn Tierney	January 20, 2025	January 28, 2025
General Counsel of Homeland Security	James Percival	December 22, 2025 (Confirmed* December 18, 2025, 53–43); *En bloc confirmation of 97 nominees.	
Under Secretary of Homeland Security for National Protection and Programs	Michael LoSapio	Awaiting Senate Confirmation	
Under Secretary of Homeland Security for National Protection and Programs	Sean Plankey	Nomination withdrawn by the President on April 27, 2026	
Under Secretary of Homeland Security for National Protection and Programs	Nick Andersen	February 26, 2026	
Under Secretary of Homeland Security for National Protection and Programs	Madhu Gottumukkala	May 19, 2025	February 26, 2026
Under Secretary of Homeland Security for National Protection and Programs	Bridget Bean	January 20, 2025	May 19, 2025
Under Secretary of Homeland Security for Intelligence and Analysis	Matthew Kozma	October 27, 2025 (Confirmed July 31, 2025, 53–44)	
Under Secretary of Homeland Security for Intelligence and Analysis	Daniel J. Tamburello	February 26, 2025	October 27, 2025
Under Secretary of Homeland Security for Intelligence and Analysis	Avery Alpha	January 20, 2025	February 26, 2025
Under Secretary of Homeland Security for Management	Brian J. Cavanaugh	August 10, 2026 (Confirmed* August 7, 2026, 51–47); *En bloc confirmation of 74 nominees.	
Under Secretary of Homeland Security for Management	Karen Evans	Nomination withdrawn by the President on July 17, 2025	
Under Secretary of Homeland Security for Management	Benjamine Huffman	March 25, 2025	August 10, 2026
Under Secretary of Homeland Security for Science and Technology	Pedro Allende	January 20, 2026 (Confirmed* December 18, 2025, 53–43); *En bloc confirmation of 97 nominees.	
Under Secretary of Homeland Security for Science and Technology	Daniel J. Tamburello	August 20, 2025	January 20, 2026
Under Secretary of Homeland Security for Science and Technology	Julie S. Brewer	January 20, 2025	August 20, 2025
Assistant Secretary of Homeland Security (Public Affairs)	Lauren Bis	February 27, 2026	
Assistant Secretary of Homeland Security (Public Affairs)	Tricia McLaughlin	January 20, 2025	February 27, 2026
Assistant Secretary of Homeland Security (Transportation Security Administration)	David P. Cummins	August 10, 2026 (Confirmed* August 7, 2026, 51–47); *En bloc confirmation of 74 nominees.	
Assistant Secretary of Homeland Security (Transportation Security Administration)	Ha Nguyen McNeill	April 21, 2025	August 10, 2026
Assistant Secretary of Homeland Security (Transportation Security Administration)	Adam Stahl	February 18, 2025	April 21, 2025
Assistant Secretary of Homeland Security (Transportation Security Administration)	Melanie Harvey	January 20, 2025	February 18, 2025
Federal Emergency Management Agency
Administrator of the Federal Emergency Management Agency	Cameron Hamilton	August 10, 2026 (Confirmed* August 7, 2026, 51–47); *En bloc confirmation of 74 nominees.	
Administrator of the Federal Emergency Management Agency	Karen Evans	December 1, 2025	May 12, 2026
Administrator of the Federal Emergency Management Agency	David Richardson	May 8, 2025	December 1, 2025
Administrator of the Federal Emergency Management Agency	Cameron Hamilton	January 22, 2025	May 8, 2025
Administrator of the Federal Emergency Management Agency	Tony Robinson	January 20, 2025	January 22, 2025
U.S. Citizenship and Immigration Services
Director of the U.S. Citizenship and Immigration Services	Joseph Edlow	July 18, 2025 (Confirmed July 15, 2025, 52–47)	
Director of the U.S. Citizenship and Immigration Services	Angelica Alfonso-Royals	May 25, 2025	July 18, 2025
Director of the U.S. Citizenship and Immigration Services	Kika Scott	February 9, 2025	May 25, 2025
Director of the U.S. Citizenship and Immigration Services	Jennifer B. Higgins	January 20, 2025	February 9, 2025
U.S. Customs and Border Protection
Commissioner of U.S. Customs and Border Protection	Rodney Scott	June 23, 2025 (Confirmed June 18, 2025, 51–46)	
Commissioner of U.S. Customs and Border Protection	Pete R. Flores	January 20, 2025	June 23, 2025
Deputy Commissioner of U.S. Customs and Border Protection	John Modlin	January 20, 2025	December 31, 2025
Chief of the U.S. Border Patrol	Rosario Vasquez	June 1, 2026	
Chief of the U.S. Border Patrol	Mike Banks	January 20, 2025	May 14, 2026
U.S. Immigration and Customs Enforcement
Director of U.S. Immigration and Customs Enforcement
Director of U.S. Immigration and Customs Enforcement	Lance Schroyer	Nomination withdrawn by the President on September 17, 2026	
Director of U.S. Immigration and Customs Enforcement	David Venturella	June 1, 2026	
Director of U.S. Immigration and Customs Enforcement	Todd Lyons	March 9, 2025	May 31, 2026
Director of U.S. Immigration and Customs Enforcement	Caleb Vitello	January 20, 2025	February 21, 2025
Deputy Director of U.S. Immigration and Customs Enforcement	Charles Wall	January 15, 2026	
Deputy Director of U.S. Immigration and Customs Enforcement	Madison Sheahan	March 9, 2025	January 15, 2026
U.S. Coast Guard
Commandant of the Coast Guard	Kevin Lunday	January 15, 2026 (Confirmed December 18, 2025, voice vote)	
Commandant of the Coast Guard	Kevin Lunday	January 21, 2025	January 15, 2026
Office of Strategy, Policy, and Plans
Under Secretary of Homeland Security for Strategy, Policy, and Plans	Robert Law	September 10, 2025 (Confirmed September 9, 2025, 49–46)	
Under Secretary of Homeland Security for Strategy, Policy, and Plans	Christopher C. Pratt	March 3, 2025	September 10, 2025
Deputy Assistant Secretary of Homeland Security for Election Integrity	Heather Honey	August 28, 2025	
United States Secret Service
Director of the U.S. Secret Service	Sean M. Curran	January 22, 2025	

== Notes ==
=== Confirmation votes ===
Confirmations by roll call vote (first administration)

Confirmations by voice vote (first administration)

Confirmations by roll call vote (second administration)

Confirmations by voice vote (second administration)
