= Benjamine Huffman =

American government official

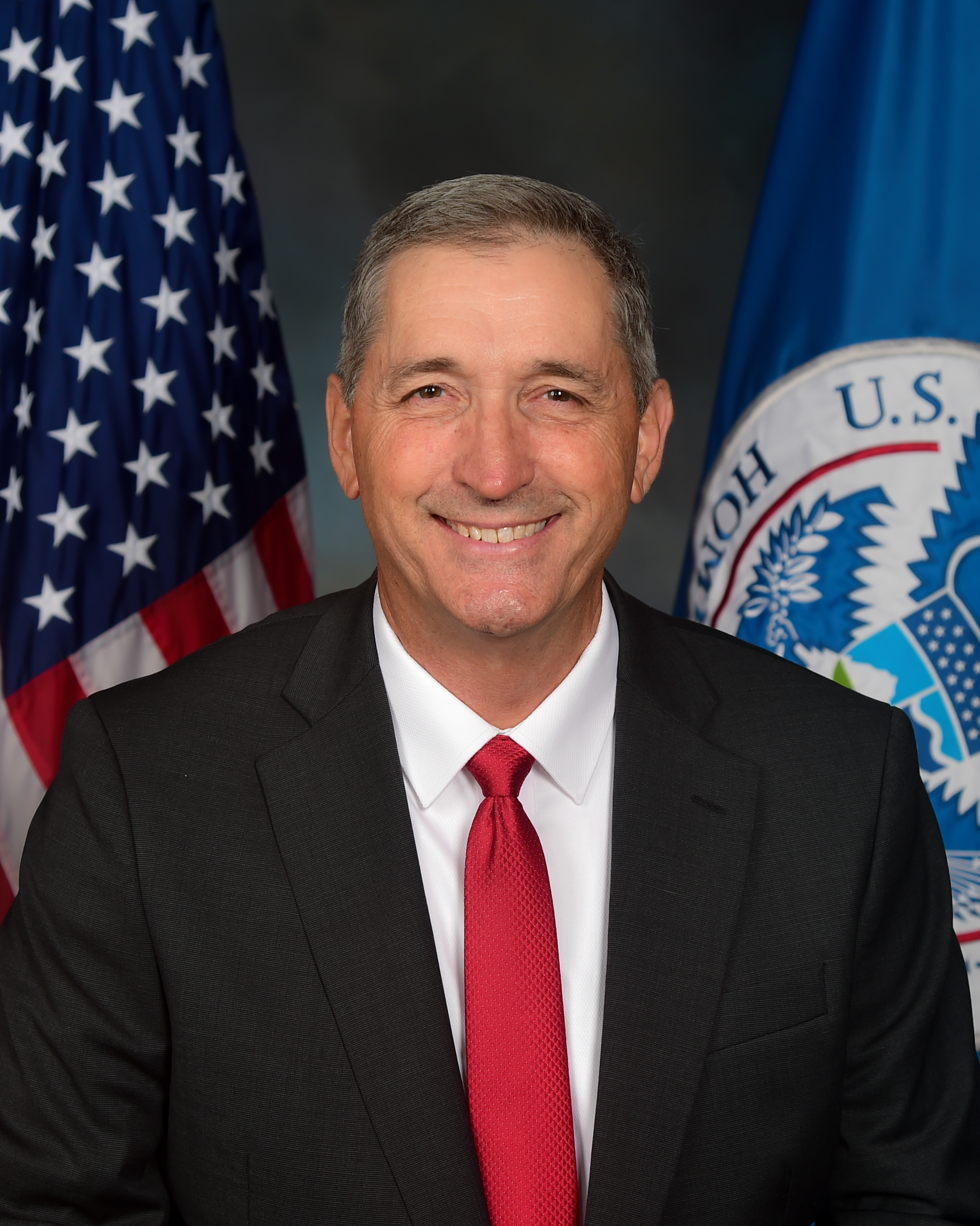
- Official portrait, 2025

Acting Under Secretary of Homeland Security for Management
- In office March 25, 2025 – August 10, 2026
- President: Donald Trump
- Preceded by: Randolph Alles (acting)
- Succeeded by: Brian J. Cavanaugh

Acting United States Deputy Secretary of Homeland Security
- In office January 28, 2025 – February 4, 2025
- President: Donald Trump
- Preceded by: MaryAnn Tierney (acting)
- Succeeded by: Troy Edgar

Acting United States Secretary of Homeland Security
- In office January 20, 2025 – January 25, 2025
- President: Donald Trump
- Deputy: MaryAnn Tierney (acting)
- Preceded by: Alejandro Mayorkas
- Succeeded by: Kristi Noem

Personal details
- Born: Benjamine Carry Huffman
- Education: South Plains College (AS); Sul Ross State University (BA, MA)

Benjamine Carry Huffman is an American law enforcement official who serves as the director of the Federal Law Enforcement Training Centers, and acting under secretary of homeland security for management since March 25, 2025. He served as the acting United States secretary of homeland security from January 20 to 25, 2025 and acting deputy secretary of homeland security from January 28 to February 4, 2025.

== Early life ==
Huffman's family comes from Stanton, Texas, and he grew up in West Texas. He attended Permian High School in Odessa, where he graduated in 1979. He later attended South Plains College, where he received an associate's degree in criminal justice, and Sul Ross State University, where he earned a bachelor's degree in general studies and a master's degree in homeland security. He worked in Stanton until 1985.

== Career ==
Huffman entered on duty with the United States Border Patrol on February 3, 1985, as a member of Border Patrol Academy Class 173. He became a member of Border Patrol Tactical Unit (BORTAC) in 1987 and served in various missions around the world, including Operation Snowcap in Bolivia and operations in South Africa. He later served as Acting Director of the Special Operations Group, where he led the U.S. Customs and Border Protection (CBP) global response team, and then as Chief of the Strategic Planning and Analysis Directorate at Border Patrol Headquarters.

In 2014, Huffman became a member of the Senior Executive Service and became Deputy Chief of the CBP El Paso Sector of the U.S. border. He became Executive Assistant Commissioner of Enterprise Services in 2019, leading 4,500 employees. He served as Acting Chief Operating Officer of CBP and in 2021, he became Acting Deputy Commissioner.

He became Director of the Federal Law Enforcement Training Centers (FLETC) on September 24, 2023, the body which provides training to those who work in various law enforcement agencies.

On January 20, 2025, Huffman was appointed by President Donald Trump to be Acting U.S. Secretary of Homeland Security, as his nominee for the position, Kristi Noem, had not yet been approved by the Senate. As Acting Secretary of Homeland Security, he ordered the end of teleworking and issued a memo authorizing the Department of Homeland Security to use federal law enforcement employees to carry out Trump's mass deportation of illegal immigrants.

Political offices
Preceded by Alejandro Mayorkas	United States Secretary of Homeland Security; Acting; 2025	Succeeded by Kristi Noem
Preceded by MaryAnn Tierney; Acting	United States Deputy Secretary of Homeland Security; Acting; 2025	Succeeded by Troy Edgar
