= Elaine Duke =

American civil servant (born 1958)

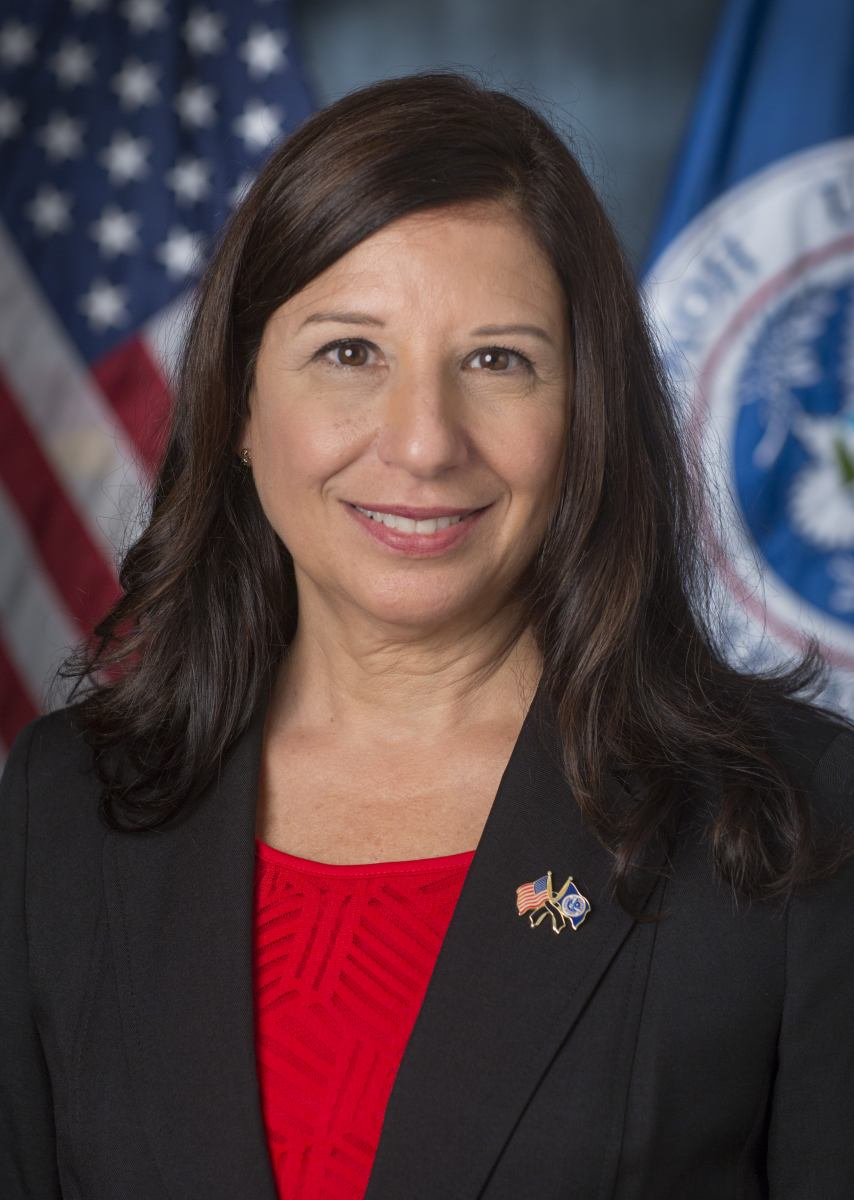
- Official portrait, 2017

7th United States Deputy Secretary of Homeland Security
- In office April 10, 2017 – April 15, 2018
- President: Donald Trump
- Preceded by: Alejandro Mayorkas
- Succeeded by: John Tien (2021)

Acting United States Secretary of Homeland Security
- In office July 31, 2017 – December 6, 2017
- President: Donald Trump
- Preceded by: John F. Kelly
- Succeeded by: Kirstjen Nielsen

United States Under Secretary of Homeland Security for Management
- In office June 27, 2008 – April 2010
- President: George W. Bush; Barack Obama
- Preceded by: Paul A. Schneider
- Succeeded by: Rafael Borras

Chief Procurement Officer of the United States Department of Homeland Security
- In office December 5, 2005 – October 28, 2007
- President: George W. Bush
- Preceded by: Gregory Rothwell
- Succeeded by: Thomas W. Essig

Personal details
- Born: Elaine Costanzo; June 26, 1958 (age 68)
- Party: Republican
- Spouse: Harold Hanson (m. 2006)
- Children: 2
- Education: Southern New Hampshire University (BS); Chaminade University (MBA)

Elaine Costanzo Duke (born June 26, 1958) is an American civil servant and former United States Deputy Secretary of Homeland Security, serving from April 10, 2017 until April 15, 2018. She became acting Secretary of Homeland Security on July 31, 2017, when John F. Kelly assumed the office of White House Chief of Staff. She left the acting position on December 6, 2017, upon the confirmation of Kirstjen Nielsen.

== Early life and education ==
The daughter of Francesco (Frank) Costanzo and Concetta Scherma, Duke is a native of Ohio. Her maternal grandparents emigrated from Aidone, Sicily and her paternal family roots can be traced to Coreno Ausonio in the Lazio region of Italy. She graduated with a B.S. in business management from New Hampshire College (now Southern New Hampshire University) and an M.B.A. from Chaminade University of Honolulu.

== Career ==
Duke held a consulting practice at Elaine Duke & Associates, LLC in Woodbridge, Virginia.

Duke served as Under Secretary of Homeland Security for Management at the department under both presidents George W. Bush and Barack Obama from July 2008 to April 2010. She has more than 28 years of experience with the federal government. In 2018, Duke was elected as a fellow of the National Academy of Public Administration.

=== Deputy Secretary of Homeland Security ===
On January 30, 2017, President Donald Trump announced that he would nominate Duke as United States Deputy Secretary of Homeland Security. Duke's nomination received a hearing before the United States Senate Committee on Homeland Security and Governmental Affairs on March 8, 2017. On March 15, 2017, her nomination was reported to the United States Senate. On April 4, 2017, she was confirmed by a vote of 85–14.

On February 23, 2018, she announced plans to retire from her position as Deputy Secretary in April of the same year, after serving in the federal government of the U.S. for over thirty years.

=== Acting Secretary of Homeland Security ===
After John F. Kelly was named White House Chief of Staff on July 28, 2017, Duke was named Acting Secretary of Homeland Security.

In September 2017, in the wake of Hurricane Maria, Duke made the decision to waive the Jones Act for ten days, which requires goods shipped between points in the U.S. to be carried by vessels built, owned, and operated by Americans. The waiving of the act allows foreign nations to bring aid to Puerto Rico.

During a White House news conference regarding Hurricane Maria, Duke said the government response to Hurricane Maria was "a good news story." San Juan, Puerto Rico Mayor Carmen Yulín Cruz responded, "This is not a good news story. This is a 'people are dying' story." Duke then traveled to Puerto Rico, where she met with officials at Luis Muñoz Marín International Airport and clarified her earlier remark by stating, "there's much more work to do, and we will never be satisfied." In 2020, Duke told in interviews that Trump briefly considered divesting from or selling Puerto Rico as the disaster hit the island.

In a July 2020 interview with The New York Times, after her tenure had ended, Duke criticized Trump's and his administration's approach and rhetoric on immigration-related issues.

== Personal life ==
In 2006, Duke married Harold Vincent Hanson, a Navy retiree. She has two sons from a previous marriage. Duke identifies as a Republican.

Political offices
Preceded by Russell Deyo; Acting	United States Deputy Secretary of Homeland Security; 2017–2018	Succeeded by Claire Grady; Acting
Preceded by John F. Kelly	United States Secretary of Homeland Security; Acting; 2017	Succeeded by Kirstjen Nielsen
