= Claire Grady =

American government official

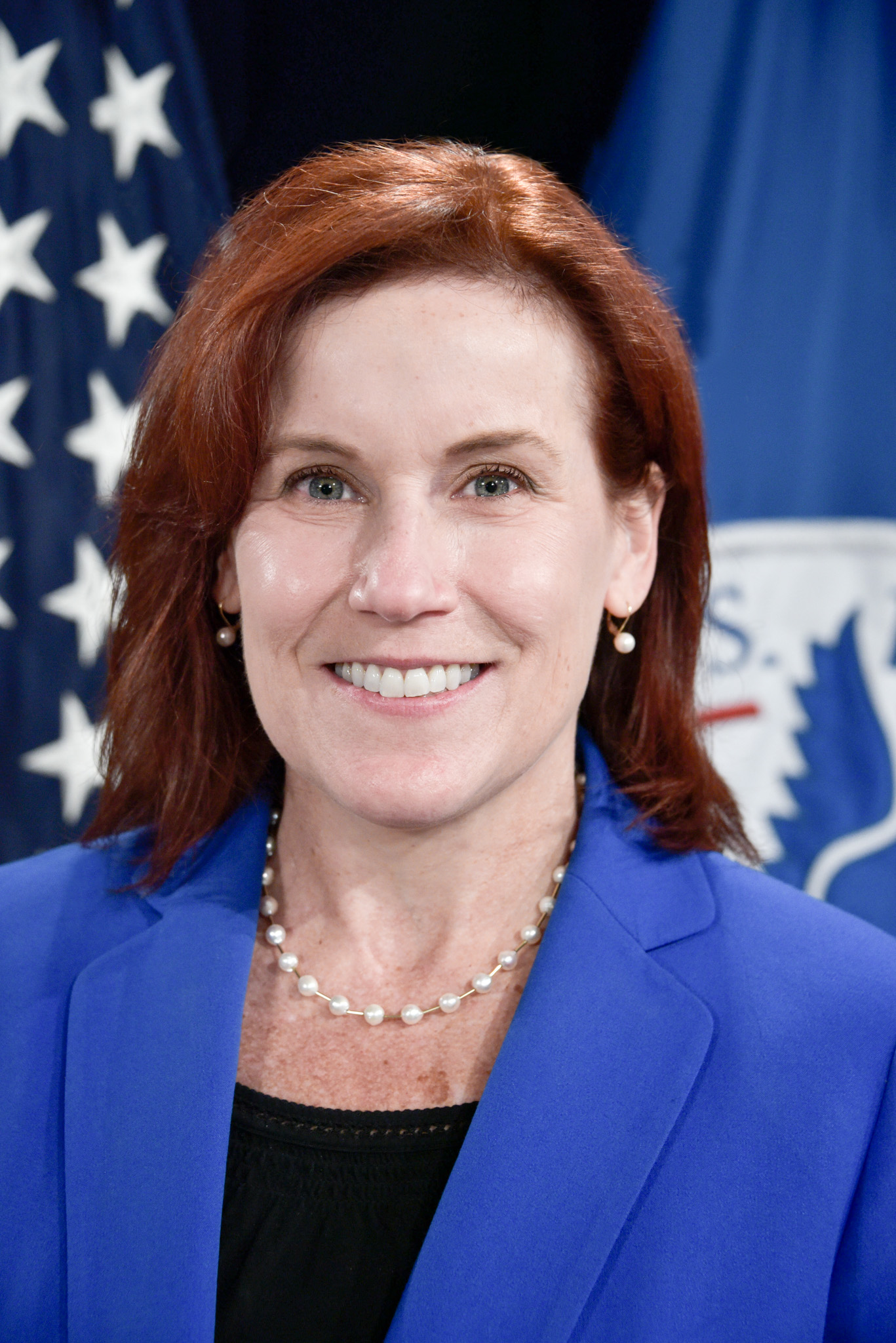
- Official portrait, 2017

United States Deputy Secretary of Homeland Security
- Acting
- In office April 16, 2018 – April 10, 2019
- President: Donald Trump
- Secretary: Kirstjen Nielsen
- Preceded by: Elaine Duke
- Succeeded by: David Pekoske (acting)

Under Secretary of Homeland Security for Management
- In office August 8, 2017 – April 10, 2019
- President: Donald Trump
- Secretary: John F. Kelly; Kirstjen Nielsen
- Preceded by: Russell Deyo
- Succeeded by: Brian J. Cavanaugh (2026)

Personal details
- Education: Trinity University, Texas (BA); University of Maryland, College Park (MBA); National Defense University (MS)
- Awards: Presidential Rank Award of Meritorious Executive
- Website: Official profile

Claire M. Grady is a former American government official who served in areas of national defense and security procurement. She served as the Under Secretary of Homeland Security for Management, as well as the acting Deputy Secretary of Homeland Security from August 2017 until April 2019. Prior to assuming the role, she served as director of defense procurement and acquisition policy at the United States Department of Defense. In her previous capacity in the U.S. Department of Defense, Grady was a member of the Defense Acquisition Board.

In her role at the Department of Defense, Grady provided advice on matters related to the procurement of major weapon and automated information systems and led policy for services acquisition. She oversaw the department's contingency, domestic, and international contract policy in areas including competition, leasing, multiyear contracting, source selection, warranties, and e-business. She previously served as the United States Coast Guard's deputy assistant commandant for acquisition, director of acquisition services, and head of contracting activity. She was also director of strategic initiatives for the Department of Homeland Security's Office of the Chief Procurement Officer.

Secretary of Homeland Security Kirstjen Nielsen submitted her resignation as secretary of homeland security on April 7, 2019, after a White House meeting with President Trump, two days after the President announced he wanted to go in a "tougher" direction on immigration. She had cut short a week-long trip to Europe where she was going to discuss cybersecurity and terror threats with senior UK and Swedish government officials.

Trump also had tweeted, on April 7, that Kevin McAleenan, the U.S. Customs and Border Protection Commissioner, would become acting secretary. Trump announced that intention following the resignation of Nielsen on April 7, 2019. Legally, under 6 U.S.C. §113(g), the role would have fallen to then-Acting Deputy Secretary Grady. That succession was made legal after Trump forced Grady, the next in line, to resign on April 9. In a tweet, Nielsen had said that she had agreed to remain in her position until April 10, 2019 "to assist with an orderly transition and ensure that key DHS missions are not impacted."

On Tuesday, April 9, 2019, Nielsen announced that Grady resigned effective April 10.

Political offices
Preceded by Elaine Duke	United States Deputy Secretary of Homeland Security; Acting; 2018–2019	Succeeded by David Pekoske; Acting
