= John Tien =

American government official (born 1963)

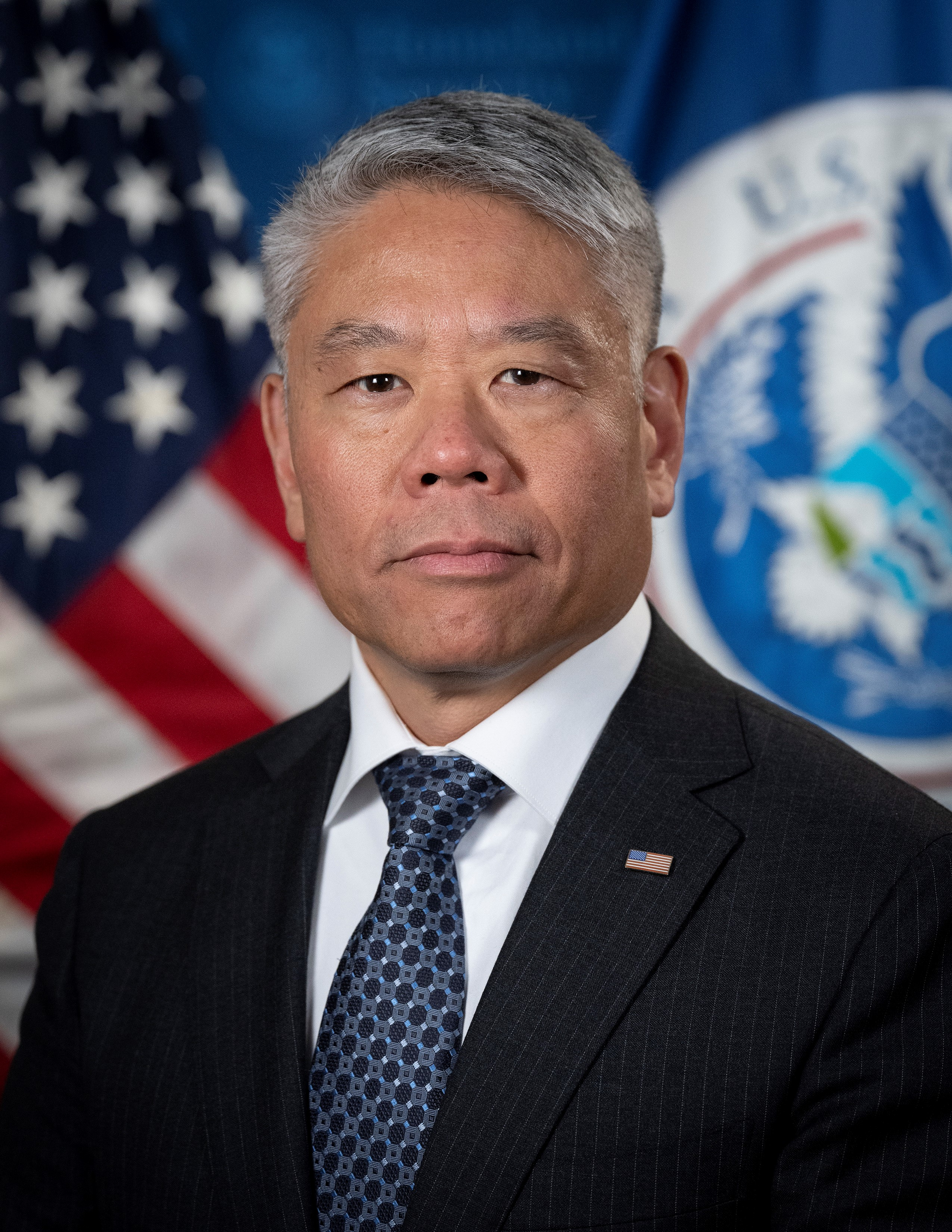
- Official portrait, 2021

8th United States Deputy Secretary of Homeland Security
- In office June 24, 2021 – July 20, 2023
- President: Joe Biden
- Preceded by: Elaine Duke (2018)
- Succeeded by: Troy Edgar

Personal details
- Born: John Kai Tien Jr. 1963 (age 62–63) New Haven, Connecticut, U.S.
- Spouse: Tracy Franklin
- Children: 2
- Education: United States Military Academy (BS); Queen's College, Oxford (BA)
- Awards: Rhodes Scholarship; White House Fellowship
- Website: Official website

Military service
- Allegiance: United States
- Branch/service: United States Army
- Years of service: 1987–2011
- Rank: Colonel
- Battles/wars: Iraq War

John Kai Tien Jr. (born 1963) is an American government official and retired United States Army officer who served as the United States deputy secretary of homeland security in the Biden administration from 2021 to 2023.

== Early life and education ==
Tien was born in New Haven, Connecticut, in 1963, the son of John K. Tien Sr. and Deborah Theresa Wong. He is a first-generation Chinese American. He was raised near Detroit and Los Angeles and attended Grosse Pointe South High School before graduating from Cerritos High School in 1981.

Tien began attendance at the United States Military Academy in 1981 but left and enrolled at the University of California, Irvine. He later transferred back to West Point in 1983, from which he earned a Bachelor of Science degree in civil engineering in 1987. In his senior year, Tien served as the First Captain, the highest-ranked West Point cadet, and the first Asian-American to hold the position.

Prior West Point First Captains include US Army Generals John J. Pershing, Douglas MacArthur, and William Westmoreland.

After graduating from West Point and being commissioned as an active duty Second Lieutenant, Tien was a Rhodes Scholar and earned a Bachelor of Arts degree from Queen's College, Oxford. His degree was promoted to a Master of Arts by tradition, seven years after Tien's matriculation.

From 2007 to 2008, Tien attended the Harvard Kennedy School as a National Security Fellow and authored a study on Smart Power with two other National Security Fellows.

== Career ==
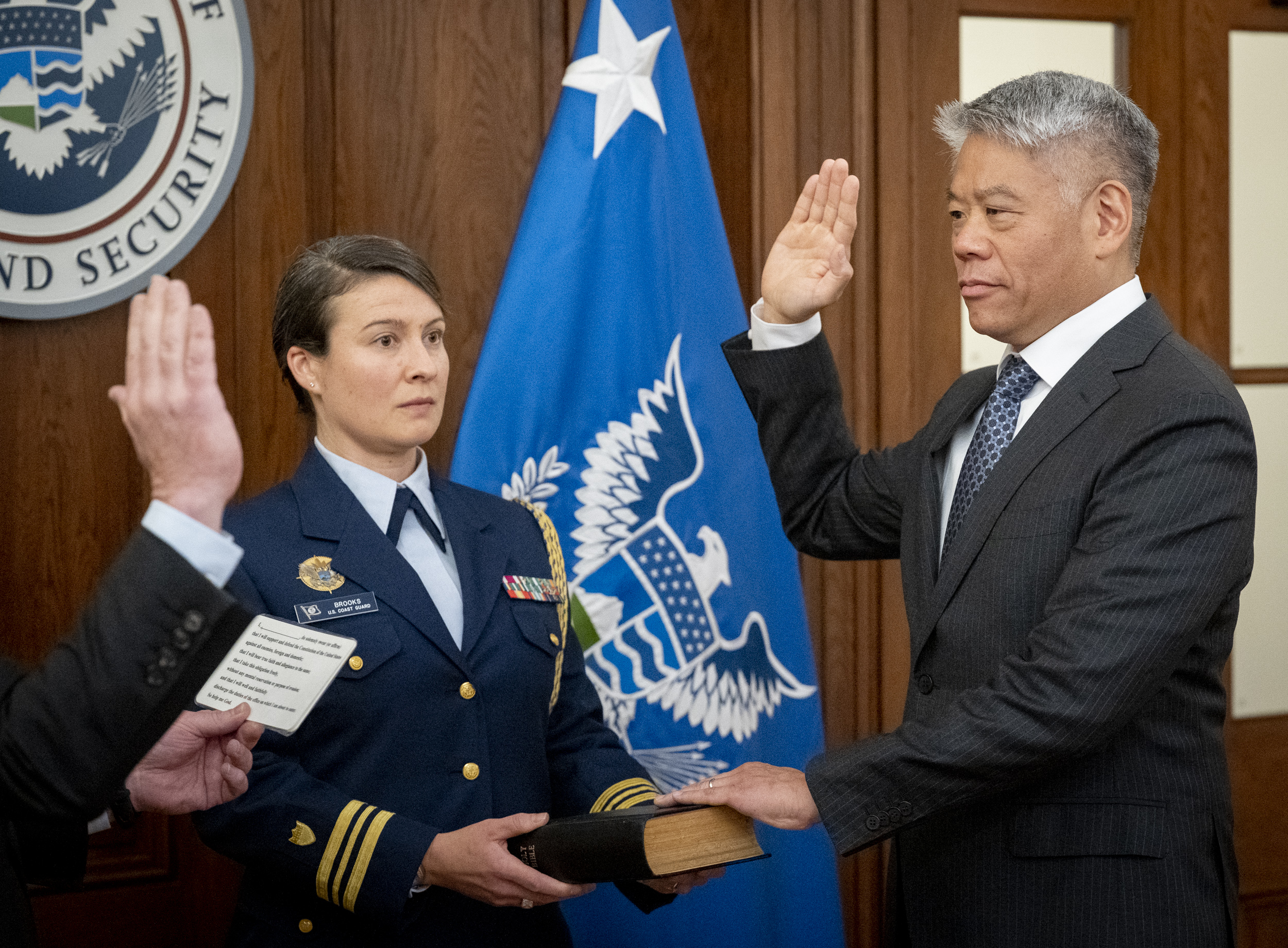
Tien sworn in as the Deputy Secretary for the Department of Homeland Security in June 2021.

Tien graduated from West Point on May 27, 1987, and was commissioned as a second lieutenant in the United States Army, where he served for 24 years as an armor officer, retiring with the rank of colonel. Tien's active duty Army career included three combat tours of duty to include serving as the Task Force 2-37 Armor Battalion Commander in Operation Iraqi Freedom in the cities of Tal Afar and Ramadi. During the Clinton administration, Tien served as a special assistant to the Deputy U.S. Trade Representative in the Office of the United States Trade Representative as a White House Fellow. During the Obama administration, Tien was the United States National Security Council senior director for Afghanistan and Pakistan from 2009 to 2011. Tien's other U.S. Army assignments included a two-year tour at the United States Military Academy as an assistant professor in the Department of Social Sciences where he taught American Politics from 1996 to 1998.

From 2011 to 2021, Tien served in various roles at Citigroup to include being the chief operating officer for Citi Retail Services largest Mastercard and American Express co-branded card portfolios. He also served as the national co-head of Citi Salutes which was Citigroup's firm-wide initiative that supported veterans and military families from 2016 to 2021.

Tien was a managing director of the Citigroup regional services organization based in Atlanta.

On April 12, 2021, President Joe Biden announced his intent to nominate Tien to be the United States deputy secretary of homeland security under Alejandro Mayorkas. On April 22, 2021, his nomination was sent to the Senate. On June 17, 2021, Tien was confirmed in a full Senate vote by 60–34. He was sworn in as Deputy Secretary on June 24, 2021.

In September 2021, Tien represented the United States of America at the Group of Seven (G7) Interior and Security Minister's meeting where he was quoted as saying, "The United States is proud to stand with our G7 allies in our counterterrorism efforts and we look forward to continued cooperation to protect our nations from shared threats to our national security, as well as continued partnership to protect and support vulnerable Afghans."

Tien retired on July 20, 2023, and was succeeded by Kristie Canegallo.

== Non-profit and other social sector work ==
From 2011 to 2021, Tien served on various U.S. military veterans boards and leadership councils including being the board chair of The Mission Continues until 2019 when his term-limited term concluded. Tien's other boards and councils included: (1) The Bob Woodruff Leadership Council; (2) The Howard and Sheri Schultz Family Foundation Advisory Board; (3) New Politics Leadership Council; (4) The Warrior Alliance Board; (5) Fourblock supporter and employer mentor; and (6) the VETLANTA board. He also served as a volunteer leadership seminar instructor at Georgia Gwinnett College. Tien remains a member of Leadership Atlanta, a civic leadership non-profit in Atlanta, Georgia.

== Awards and decorations ==
Tien's military awards and decorations include the Bronze Star Medal with one oak leaf cluster, the Presidential Unit Citation, the Valorous Unit Award, and the Combat Action Badge. In 1995, Tien was one of twelve U.S. Army active-duty captains to win the General Douglas MacArthur Leadership Award. In 2016, a room was dedicated to Tien at West Point's historic Thayer Hotel.

== Personal life ==
Prior to becoming DHS Deputy Secretary, Tien resided in Atlanta with his wife Tracy Tien and their two daughters.

Political offices
Preceded by David Pekoske; Acting	United States Deputy Secretary of Homeland Security; 2021–2023	Succeeded by Troy Edgar
