= Lance Schroyer =

American former law enforcement officer

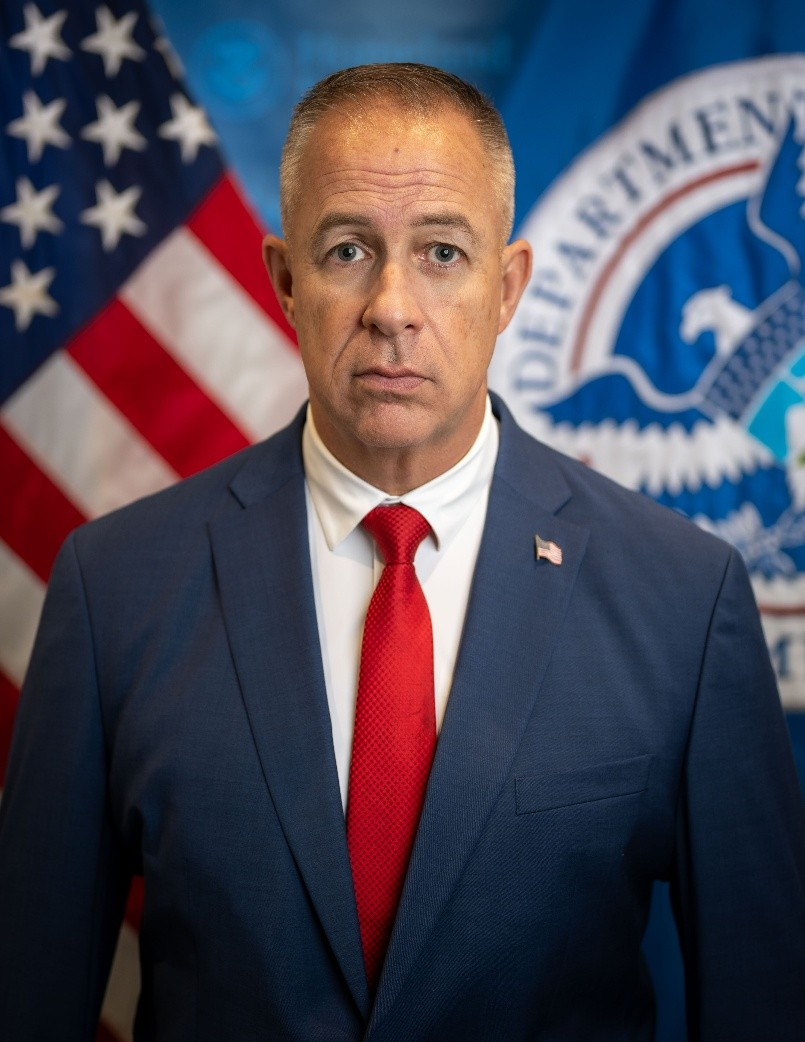
- Official portrait, 2026
- Born: Richard Lance Schroyer; 1971 or 1972 (age 54–55)
- Education: Northeastern Oklahoma A&M College (AA)

Richard Lance Schroyer (born 1971/1972) is an American former law enforcement officer.

== Early life and education ==
Richard Lance Schroyer was born in 1971 or 1972. Schroyer graduated from Moore High School in Moore, Oklahoma, and from Northeastern Oklahoma A&M College. He served in the United States Marine Corps.

== Career ==
Schroyer began working in law enforcement in Oklahoma in 1997. By the following year, he had become an officer in the Tulsa Police Department. Schroyer became an Oklahoma Highway Patrol trooper by December 2000. He later became a major in the Oklahoma Department of Public Safety, where among other duties he handled operations in the 287(g) program. Since March 2026, when Markwayne Mullin became the secretary of homeland security, Schroyer has served as a senior advisor to Mullin.

=== Director of Immigration and Customs Enforcement nomination ===
According to The Wall Street Journal, Mullin encouraged officials in the Trump administration to appoint a law enforcement officer from Oklahoma who lacked a controversial background in immigration as the director of United States Immigration and Customs Enforcement. On June 27, 2026, President Donald Trump announced that he would nominate Schroyer to serve in the position; the agency's director had not been confirmed by the Senate since 2017. Kentucky senator Rand Paul, the chair of the Senate Committee on Homeland Security and Governmental Affairs, blocked Schroyer's hearing until the Department of Homeland Security provided more information on the killings of Renée Good and Alex Pretti. The Trump administration withdrew Schroyer's nomination on September 17.
