= United States Deputy Secretary of Homeland Security =

United States government position

- Seal of the Department of Homeland Security

- Flag of the United States deputy secretary of homeland security

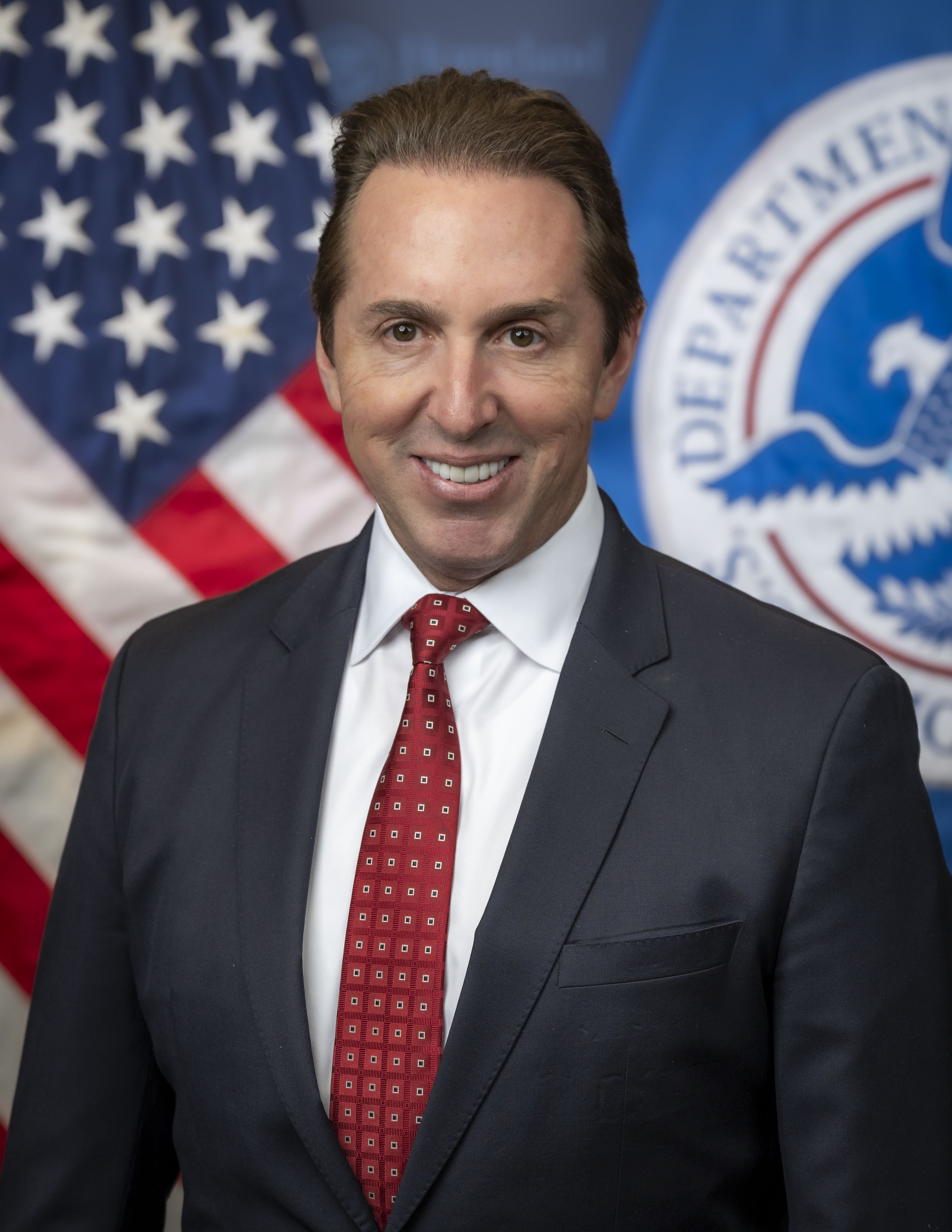
- Incumbent; Troy Edgar since March 8, 2025
- United States Department of Homeland Security
- Style: Ms./Mr. Deputy Secretary (informal); The Honorable (formal)
- Status: Chief operating officer
- Reports to: United States Secretary of Homeland Security
- Appointer: The president with Senate advice and consent
- Term length: No fixed term
- Constituting instrument: 6 U.S.C. § 113
- Formation: 2003 (23 years ago)
- First holder: Gordon R. England
- Succession: 1st in DHS succession
- Salary: Executive Schedule, level II
- Website: www.dhs.gov

The deputy secretary of homeland security is the chief operating officer of the United States Department of Homeland Security, with responsibility for managing day-to-day operations. The department has over 208,000 employees and an annual budget of more than $48.5 billion.

If the secretary of homeland security dies, resigns, or is otherwise unable to perform the functions and duties of the office, the deputy secretary is to serve as an acting secretary.

The deputy secretary is appointed by the president with the advice and consent of the Senate. The position of deputy secretary was created along with the creation of the Department of Homeland Security in 2002. The deputy secretary is paid $168,000 annually.

== List of deputy secretaries of homeland security ==
No.	Portrait	Deputy Secretary	Took office	Left office	Time in office	Party	President
1	Gordon R. England	Gordon R. England (born 1937)	January 24, 2003	October 1, 2003	250 days	Republican	George W. Bush (R)
2	James Loy	James Loy (born 1942)	October 1, 2003	March 1, 2005	1 year, 151 days	Independent	George W. Bush (R)
3	Michael P. Jackson	Michael P. Jackson (born 1954)	March 10, 2005	October 26, 2007	2 years, 230 days	Independent	George W. Bush (R)
4	Paul A. Schneider	Paul A. Schneider (born 1944)	June 5, 2008	February 11, 2009	251 days	Independent	George W. Bush (R); Barack Obama (D)
5	Jane Holl Lute	Jane Holl Lute (born 1956)	April 3, 2009	April 9, 2013	4 years, 6 days	Independent	Barack Obama (D)
–	Rand Beers	Rand Beers (Note: Rand Beers served as acting deputy secretary in his capacity as undersecretary of homeland security for national protection and programs.) (born 1942); Acting	April 9, 2013	September 6, 2013	150 days	Democratic	Barack Obama (D)
–	Rafael Borras	Rafael Borras (Note: Rafael Borras served as acting deputy secretary in his capacity as under secretary of homeland security for management.); Acting	September 26, 2013	December 23, 2013	88 days	Independent	Barack Obama (D)
6	Alejandro Mayorkas	Alejandro Mayorkas (born 1959)	December 23, 2013	October 28, 2016	2 years, 310 days	Democratic	Barack Obama (D)
–	Russell Deyo	Russell Deyo (Note: Russell Deyo served as acting deputy secretary in his capacity as under secretary of homeland security for management.); Acting	November 1, 2016	April 4, 2017	154 days	Independent	Barack Obama (D); Donald Trump (R)
7	Elaine Duke	Elaine Duke (born 1958)	April 10, 2017	April 15, 2018	1 year, 5 days	Republican	Donald Trump (R)
–	Claire Grady	Claire Grady (Note: Claire Grady served as acting deputy secretary in her capacity as under secretary of homeland security for management.); Acting	April 16, 2018	April 10, 2019	359 days	Independent	Donald Trump (R)
–	David Pekoske	David Pekoske (Note: David Pekoske served as acting deputy secretary in his capacity as administrator of the Transportation Security Administration.) (born 1955); Acting	April 11, 2019	November 13, 2019	216 days	Independent	Donald Trump (R)
–	Ken Cuccinelli	Ken Cuccinelli (Note: Ken Cuccinelli served as the senior official performing the duties of deputy secretary in his capacity as acting director of United States Citizenship and Immigration Services. His tenure was ruled unlawful.) (born 1968); Acting	November 13, 2019	January 20, 2021	1 year, 68 days	Republican	Donald Trump (R)
–	David Pekoske[5]	David Pekoske^{[5]} (born 1955); Acting	January 20, 2021	June 24, 2021	155 days	Independent	Joe Biden (D)
8	John K. Tien	John K. Tien (born 1963)	June 24, 2021	July 20, 2023	2 years, 26 days	Independent	Joe Biden (D)
–	Kristie Canegallo	Kristie Canegallo (Note: Kristie Canegallo served as acting deputy secretary in her capacity as chief of staff.) (born 1979); Acting	July 21, 2023	January 20, 2025	1 year, 183 days	Democratic	Joe Biden (D)
–	MaryAnn Tierney	MaryAnn Tierney; Acting	January 20, 2025	January 28, 2025	8 days	Independent	Donald Trump (R)
–	Benjamine Huffman	Benjamine Huffman (Note: Benjamine Huffman served as acting deputy secretary in his capacity as director of the Federal Law Enforcement Training Centers.); Acting	January 28, 2025	February 4, 2025	7 days	Republican	Donald Trump (R)
9	Troy Edgar	Troy Edgar (born 1967)	March 8, 2025	Incumbent	1 year, 184 days	Republican	Donald Trump (R)
