= Rafael Borras =

American politician

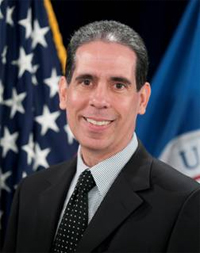

United States Deputy Secretary of Homeland Security
- Acting
- In office September 26, 2013 – December 23, 2013
- President: Barack Obama
- Preceded by: Rand Beers
- Succeeded by: Alejandro Mayorkas

Rafael Borras is an American politician. In 2013, he was appointed by the President and confirmed by the Senate to serve as the Under Secretary for Management at the Department of Homeland Security (DHS). He joined the Department in April 2010.

Borras is a Fellow of The National Academy of Public Administration.

== Biography ==
Rafael earned his degree in political science and public administration from Florida International University.

== Career ==
Borras has more than 30 years of management experience, including over 20 years in federal government and city government, and 10 years in the private sector. Prior to his appointment with DHS, Borras served as a Vice President with URS Corporation, a global engineering services firm.

Prior to joining URS, Borras served as the Regional Administrator for the Mid-Atlantic Region of the U.S. General Services Administration where he managed an organization with more than 1,300 employees, providing federal customer agencies with real estate, supply and procurement, vehicle acquisition, and information technology services. Borras also served as Deputy Assistant Secretary for Administration in the U.S. Department of Commerce where he was responsible for overseeing the Department's financial, personnel, information technology, budget, administrative services, acquisition, and grants functions.

In city government, Borras served as Deputy City Manager in the City of Hartford, CT, where he was responsible for the departments of finance, police, fire, code enforcement, information technology, purchasing, budget, and human relations. He also served as Deputy City Manager of New Rochelle, NY.

Borras began his public sector career as Administrative Officer for the Office of the County Manager in 1982 with Metropolitan Dade County Government in Dade County, Florida.

=== DHS ===
Borras exercises leadership authority over all aspects of the Department's management programs as the designated Chief Management Officer and Chief Acquisition Officer. As Chief Management Officer, Borras oversees management of DHS's nearly $60 billion budget, appropriations, expenditure of funds, accounting, and finance.

As Chief Acquisition Officer, he administers control over the Department's approximately $19 billion in procurement. Borras oversees the Management Directorate's six lines of business - financial, human capital, information technology, procurement, security, and administrative.
