= David Pekoske =

American government official (born 1955)

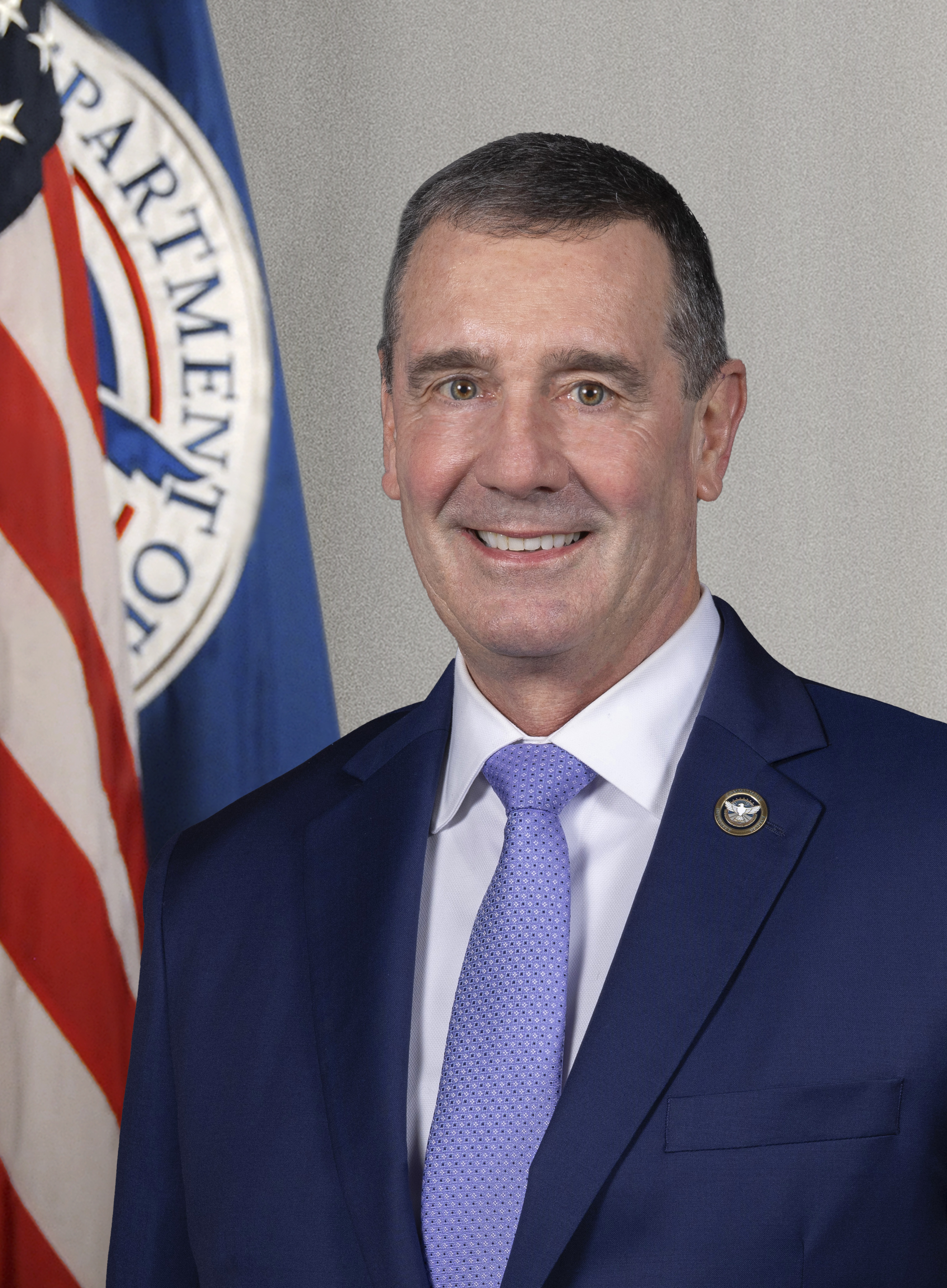
- Official portrait, 2024

7th Administrator of the Transportation Security Administration
- In office August 10, 2017 – January 20, 2025*
- President: Donald Trump; Joe Biden
- Deputy: Huban A. Gowadia; Patricia Cogswell; Michael T. Miklos; Holly Canevari
- Preceded by: Peter V. Neffenger
- Succeeded by: David P. Cummins

Acting United States Deputy Secretary of Homeland Security
- In office January 20, 2021 – June 24, 2021
- President: Joe Biden
- Preceded by: Ken Cuccinelli (de facto)
- Succeeded by: John Tien
- In office April 11, 2019 – November 13, 2019
- President: Donald Trump
- Preceded by: Claire Grady (acting)
- Succeeded by: Ken Cuccinelli (acting)

Acting United States Secretary of Homeland Security
- In office January 20, 2021 – February 2, 2021
- President: Joe Biden
- Preceded by: Pete Gaynor (acting)
- Succeeded by: Alejandro Mayorkas

Personal details
- Born: May 5, 1955 (age 71) Meriden, Connecticut, U.S.
- Education: United States Coast Guard Academy (BS); Columbia University (MPA); Massachusetts Institute of Technology (MBA)

Military service
- Allegiance: United States
- Branch/service: United States Coast Guard
- Years of service: 1977–2010
- Rank: Vice Admiral
- Commands: Vice Commandant of the United States Coast Guard; Deputy Commandant for Operations; Commander, Pacific Area and Coast Guard Defense Forces West; Commander, First Coast Guard District; Commander, Group/MSO Long Island Sound
- Battles/wars: Cold War; September 11, 2001 attacks
- Awards: Coast Guard Distinguished Service Medal (2); Legion of Merit (2)
- *Patricia Cogswell served in an acting capacity while Pekoske was acting deputy secretary from April 11, 2019 – November 13, 2019. Darby LaJoye served in an acting capacity while Pekoske was acting deputy secretary from January 20, 2021 – June 24, 2021.

David Peter Pekoske (born May 5, 1955) is an American government official and retired U.S. Coast Guard vice admiral who served as the seventh administrator of the Transportation Security Administration in the United States Department of Homeland Security (DHS) from 2017 to 2025. He served as the acting deputy secretary of homeland security from April to November 2019 and again from January to June 2021. From January 20, 2021, to February 2, 2021, he served as acting secretary of homeland security, during the Senate confirmation of Alejandro Mayorkas. Pekoske retired with 33 years of active military service in 2010 as the 26th vice commandant of the Coast Guard.

== Early life and education ==
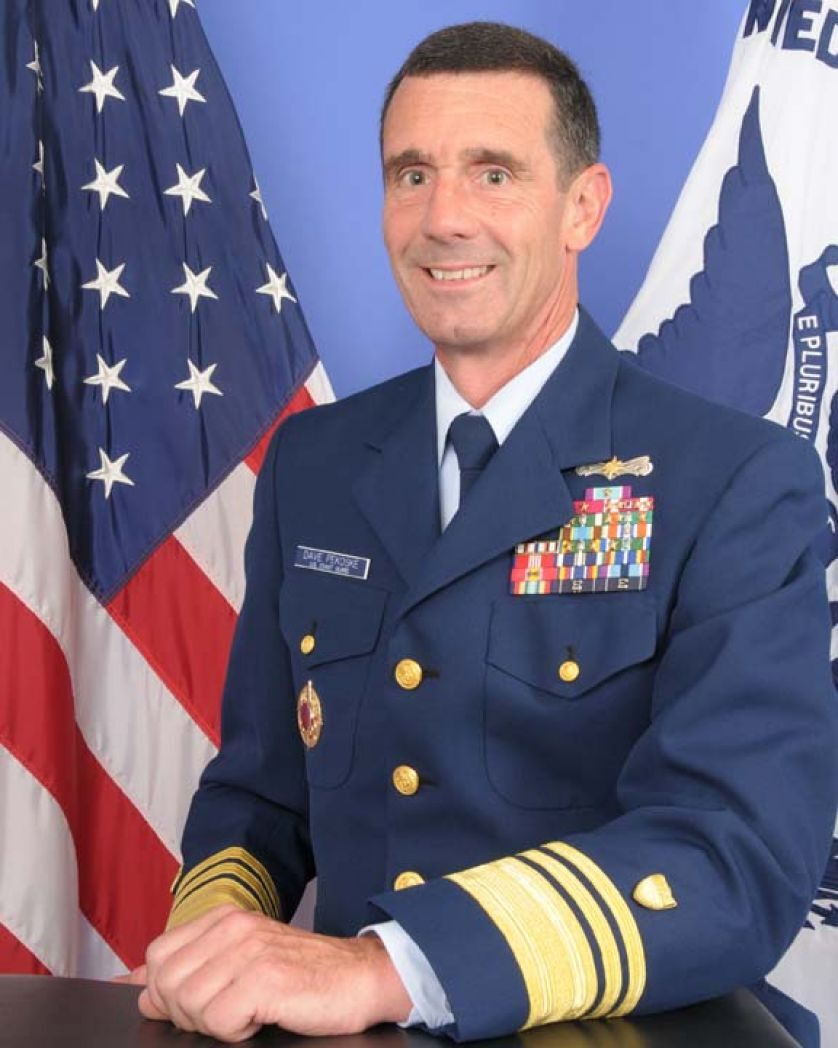
26th Vice-Commandant of the United States Coast Guard

Pekoske was born in Meriden, Connecticut. He earned his Bachelor of Science degree in ocean engineering from the United States Coast Guard Academy in New London, Connecticut. He is a 1989 graduate of the School of International and Public Affairs at Columbia University with a Master of Public Administration degree. Pekoske graduated from the MIT Sloan School of Management with an MBA in 1997.

== Career ==
Pekoske served as a member of the United States Coast Guard Academy Board of Trustees from 2006 to 2008.

His 33-year career included a variety of operational and staff assignments and command of six Coast Guard operational units. He served on the west, gulf and east coasts of the United States and on the Great Lakes. Pekoske's operational expertise was in the operations ashore community. His staff expertise is in strategic planning, program analysis and budget development.

Pekoske served Executive Assistant to the Commandant from 2001 to 2004. From 1999 to 2001, he commanded Coast Guard Group/Marine Safety Office (now Sector) Long Island Sound, based in New Haven, Connecticut.

=== Flag assignments ===
Vice Admiral Pekoske served as Commander, Pacific Area/Coast Guard Defense Forces West in Alameda, California. He oversaw the operation of units performing missions in marine safety, maritime mobility, protection of natural resources, maritime security, homeland security and national defense in an Area of Operations encompassing over 73,000,000 square miles (190,000,000 km^{2}) throughout the Pacific Basin and Far East. Prior to that, he was the Assistant Commandant for Operations at Coast Guard Headquarters. From 2004 to 2006 he was Commander of the First Coast Guard District/Maritime Defense Command One headquartered in Boston, Massachusetts.

=== Vice-commandant ===
Vice Admiral Pekoske served as vice commandant of the United States Coast Guard from August 7, 2009, to May 24, 2010. As second in command to Admiral Thad Allen and COO, Pekoske executed the commandant's strategic intent, managed internal organizational governance and served as the component acquisition executive.

== TSA administrator ==
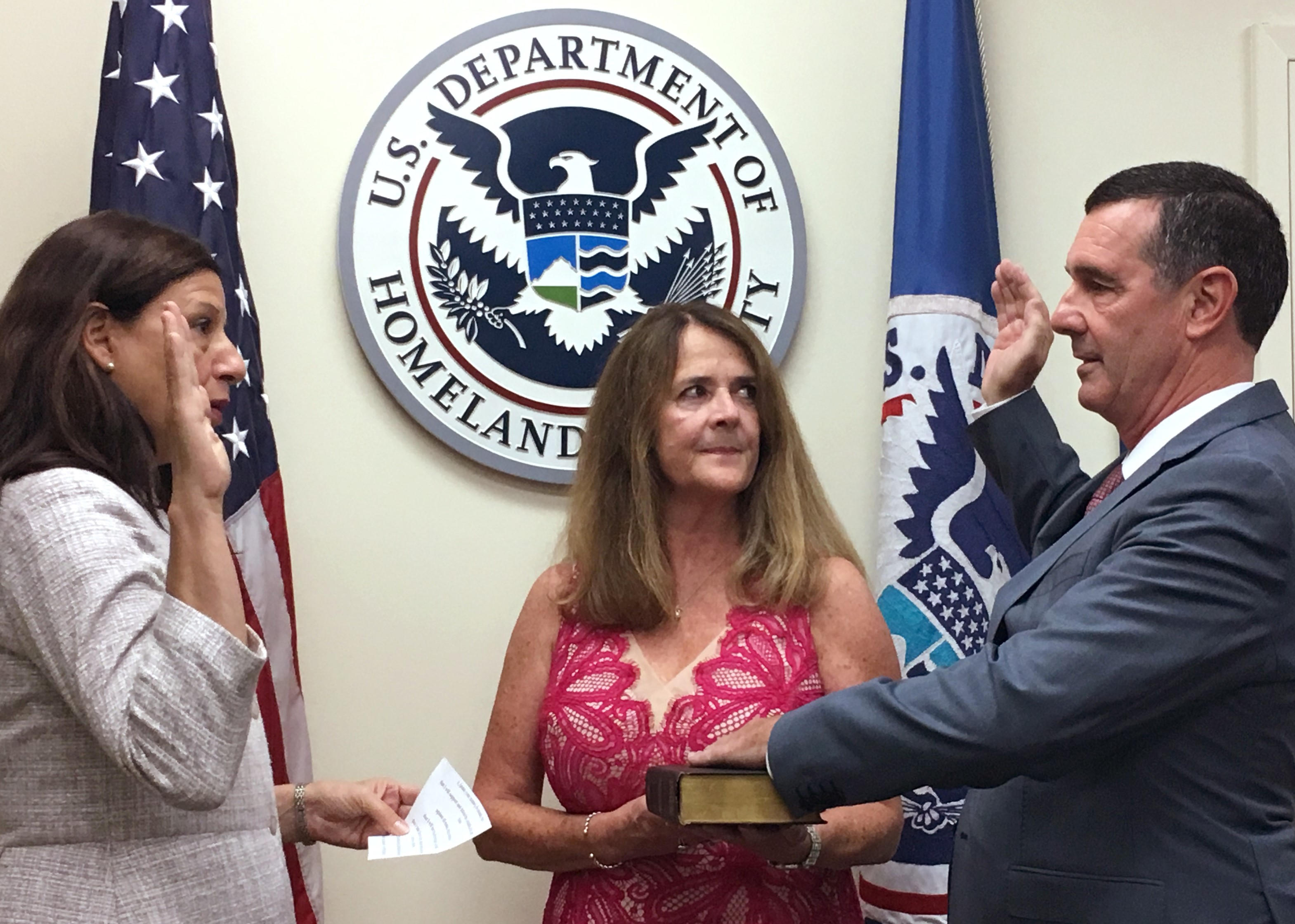
Administrator David Pekoske being ceremonially sworn in at DHS headquarters by Acting Secretary Elaine Duke.

On June 5, 2017, President Donald Trump announced that he had nominated Pekoske as the seventh Administrator of the Transportation Security Administration.

On August 3, 2017, Pekoske was confirmed by the United States Senate as the next TSA administrator. On August 10, 2017, he was sworn in as TSA's seventh administrator. On May 6, 2022, Pekoske was nominated to a second five-year term by President Joe Biden. On September 15, 2022, Pekoske was confirmed by the Senate by a 77–18 vote. In the interim, Pekoske reverted to an acting status.

On January 20, 2025, Pekoske was forced out of office by President Trump.

=== Acting deputy secretary of homeland security ===
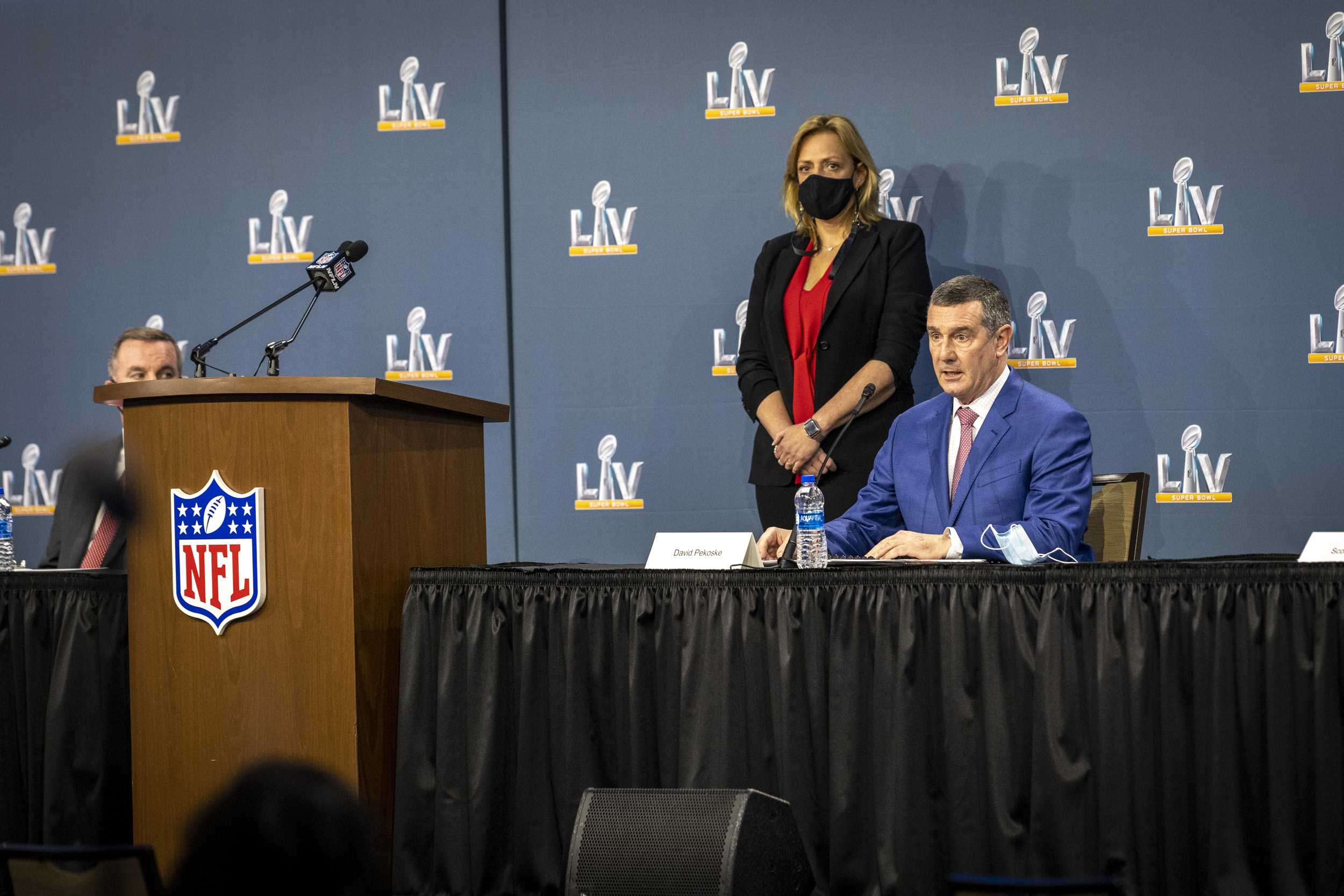
Pekoske as Acting Deputy Secretary of Homeland Security at Super Bowl LV.

On April 11, 2019, Pekoske was designated as the senior official performing the duties of the deputy secretary by Acting Secretary of the Department of Homeland Security Kevin McAleenan, making him the acting deputy secretary of the Department of Homeland Security. Pekoske remained the TSA Administrator, but day-to-day operations of TSA were overseen by TSA's acting deputy administrator, Patricia Cogswell.

On November 13, 2019, with the appointment of Ken Cuccinelli as Acting Deputy Secretary, Pekoske returned to his duties as TSA Administrator.

Following Alejandro Mayorkas' confirmation and swearing in as secretary, Pekoske served a second time as acting deputy secretary until the confirmation of the permanent deputy secretary, John Tien.

=== Acting secretary of homeland security ===
From January 20, 2021, to February 2, 2021, Pekoske was appointed acting secretary of homeland security by President Joe Biden, during the Senate confirmation of Alejandro Mayorkas to the role. While he served as acting secretary, the senior official performing the duties of TSA administrator was Darby LaJoye, TSA's executive assistant administrator for security operations.

== Awards ==
His personal decorations include, among others, two awards of the Homeland Security Distinguished Service Medal, Coast Guard Distinguished Service Medal (2), the Legion of Merit (2), the Meritorious Service Medal (5), the Coast Guard Commendation Medal (2), the Coast Guard Achievement Medal (4) and the Commandant's Letter of Commendation Ribbon.

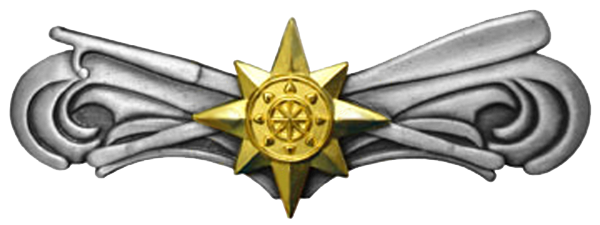
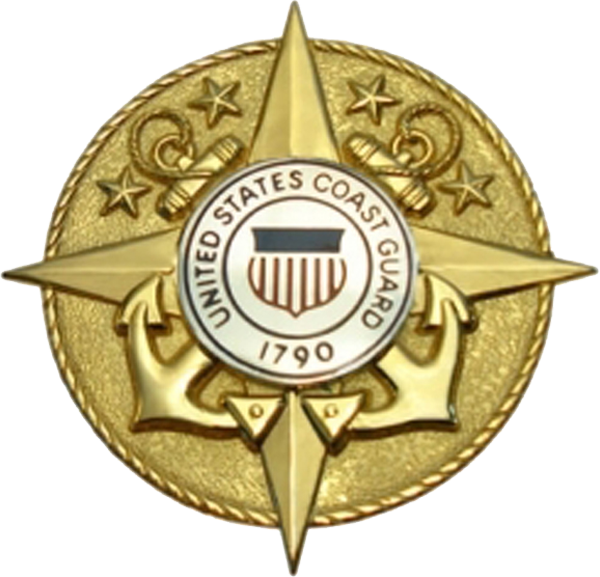
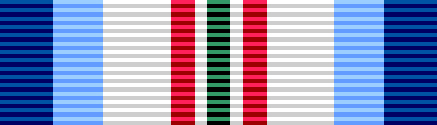
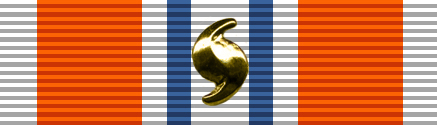
Advanced Boat Force Operations Insignia
Commandant Staff Badge
Homeland Security Distinguished Service Medal
Coast Guard Distinguished Service Medal with gold award star
Legion of Merit with gold award star
Meritorious Service Medal with four gold award stars and the Operational Distinguishing Device.
Coast Guard Commendation Medal with gold award star and the Operational Distinguishing Device
Coast Guard Achievement Medal with three gold award stars and the Operational Distinguishing Device
Commandant's Letter of Commendation Ribbon
Coast Guard Presidential Unit Citation with "hurricane symbol"
Secretary of Transportation Outstanding Unit Award
Coast Guard Unit Commendation with two gold award stars and the Operational Distinguishing Device
Coast Guard Meritorious Unit Commendation
Meritorious Team Commendation
Coast Guard E Ribbon
Coast Guard Bicentennial Unit Commendation
National Defense Service Medal with two bronze Service stars
Global War on Terrorism Service Medal
Humanitarian Service Medal
Coast Guard Sea Service Ribbon
Coast Guard Expert Rifleman Marksmanship Medal
Coast Guard Expert Pistol Marksmanship Medal

Military offices
Preceded by Vivien Crea	Vice Commandant of the United States Coast Guard; 2009–2010	Succeeded by Sally Brice-O'Hara
Political offices
Preceded by Huban A. Gowadia; Acting	7th Administrator of the Transportation Security Administration; 2017–2025	Succeeded by Melanie Harvey; Acting
Preceded by Claire Grady; Acting	United States Deputy Secretary of Homeland Security; Acting; 2019; 2021	Succeeded by Ken Cuccinelli; Acting
Preceded by Ken Cuccinelli; Acting	United States Deputy Secretary of Homeland Security; Acting; 2019; 2021	Succeeded by John Tien
Preceded by Pete Gaynor; Acting	United States Secretary of Homeland Security; Acting; 2021	Succeeded by Alejandro Mayorkas
