= Kirstjen Nielsen =

American attorney (born 1972)

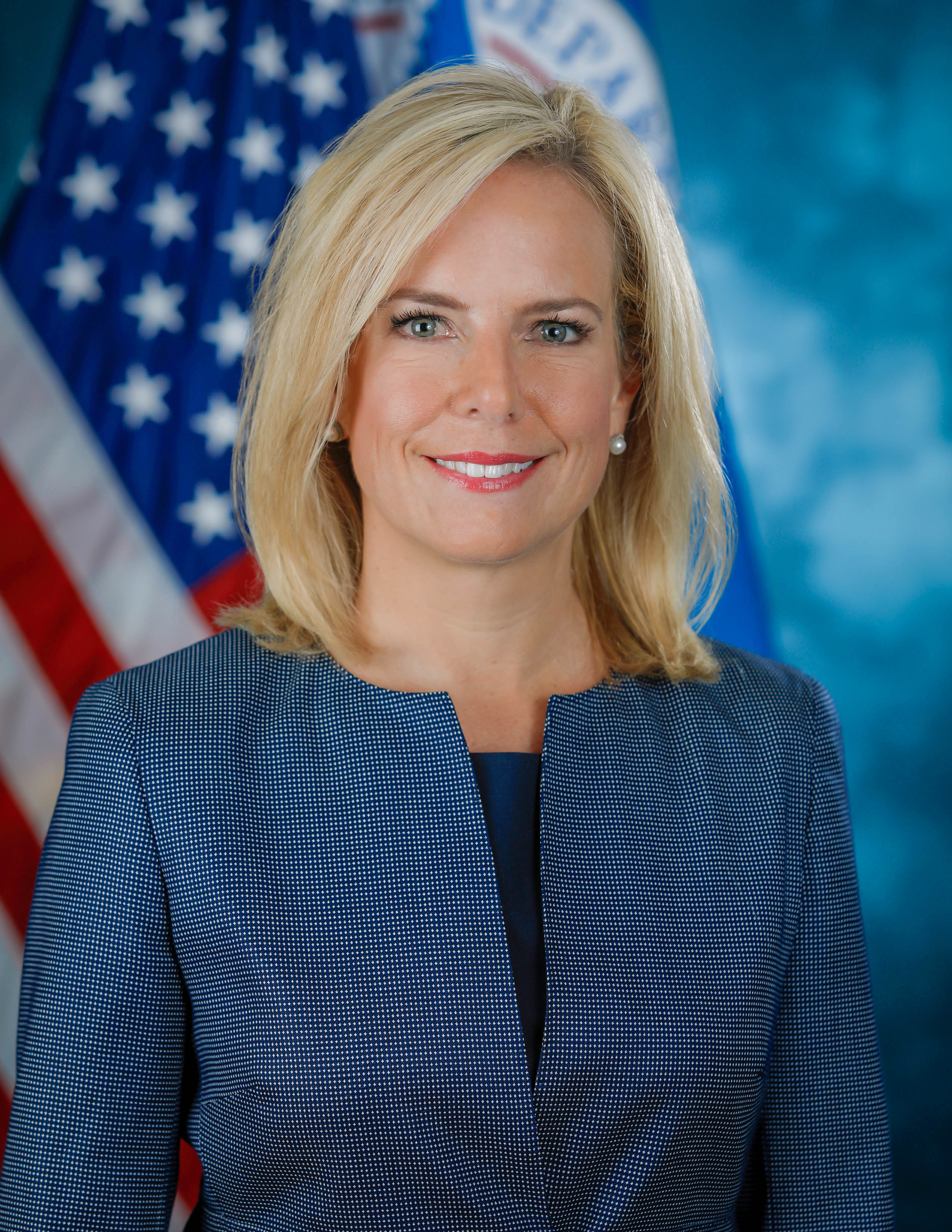
- Official portrait, 2018

6th United States Secretary of Homeland Security
- In office December 6, 2017 – April 10, 2019
- President: Donald Trump
- Deputy: Elaine Duke; Claire Grady (acting)
- Preceded by: John F. Kelly
- Succeeded by: Alejandro Mayorkas

White House Principal Deputy Chief of Staff
- In office September 6, 2017 – December 6, 2017
- President: Donald Trump
- Preceded by: Katie Walsh
- Succeeded by: James W. Carroll

Personal details
- Born: Kirstjen Michele Nielsen; May 14, 1972 (age 54) Colorado Springs, Colorado, U.S.
- Education: Georgetown University (BS); University of Virginia (JD)

Kirstjen Michele Nielsen (/ˈkɪərstən/; born May 14, 1972) is an American attorney who served as United States secretary of homeland security from 2017 to 2019. She is a former principal White House deputy chief of staff to President Donald Trump and was chief of staff to John F. Kelly during his tenure as Secretary of Homeland Security.

Nielsen was confirmed as Secretary of Homeland Security on December 5, 2017. Nielsen implemented the Trump administration family separation policy. She resigned in April 2019. Since departing government she has assumed several advisory roles in the private sector.

== Early life and education ==
Kirstjen Michele Nielsen was born on May 14, 1972, in Colorado Springs, Colorado, to Phyllis Michele Nielsen and James McHenry Nielsen, both United States Army physicians. Nielsen's father is of Danish ancestry while her mother is of Italian descent. The oldest of three children, Nielsen has a sister, Ashley, and a brother, Fletcher. Following Nielsen's birth, the family relocated from Colorado Springs to Clearwater, Florida.

Following high school, Nielsen attended the Georgetown School of Foreign Service, graduating with a Bachelor of Science degree. She then attended the University of Virginia School of Law, receiving her Juris Doctor in 1999. She also took Japanese studies at Nanzan University, in Nagoya, Japan.

== Early career ==
Nielsen served during the George W. Bush administration as special assistant to the president and as senior director for prevention, preparedness and response (PPR) at the White House Homeland Security Council. She also set up, and led as assistant administrator, the Transportation Security Administration's Office of Legislative Policy and Government Affairs.

After leaving the Bush administration in 2008, Nielsen joined Civitas Group LLC, a strategic advisory and investment firm focused on homeland and national security as general counsel, serving alongside Andrew Weis. In 2012, Nielsen became the founder and president of Sunesis Consulting. The firm's online profile listed her as its only employee, with the firm's phone number being Nielsen's personal cellphone. In September 2013 the company won a federal contract, with an initial award of about $450,000, to "provide policy and legislation, technical writing, and organizational development" to the Federal Emergency Management Agency.

Nielsen was a senior member of the Resilience Task Force of the Center for Cyber & Homeland Security Committee at George Washington University and served on the Global Risks Report Advisory Board of the World Economic Forum.

== Initial positions in the Trump administration ==
Nielsen served as John F. Kelly's chief of staff at the United States Department of Homeland Security (DHS) after he assumed that position on January 20, 2017. In early September 2017, just over a month after Kelly became White House chief of staff on July 31, 2017, Nielsen moved to the White House, becoming the principal deputy chief of staff under Kelly.

== Secretary of Homeland Security ==
=== Nomination ===
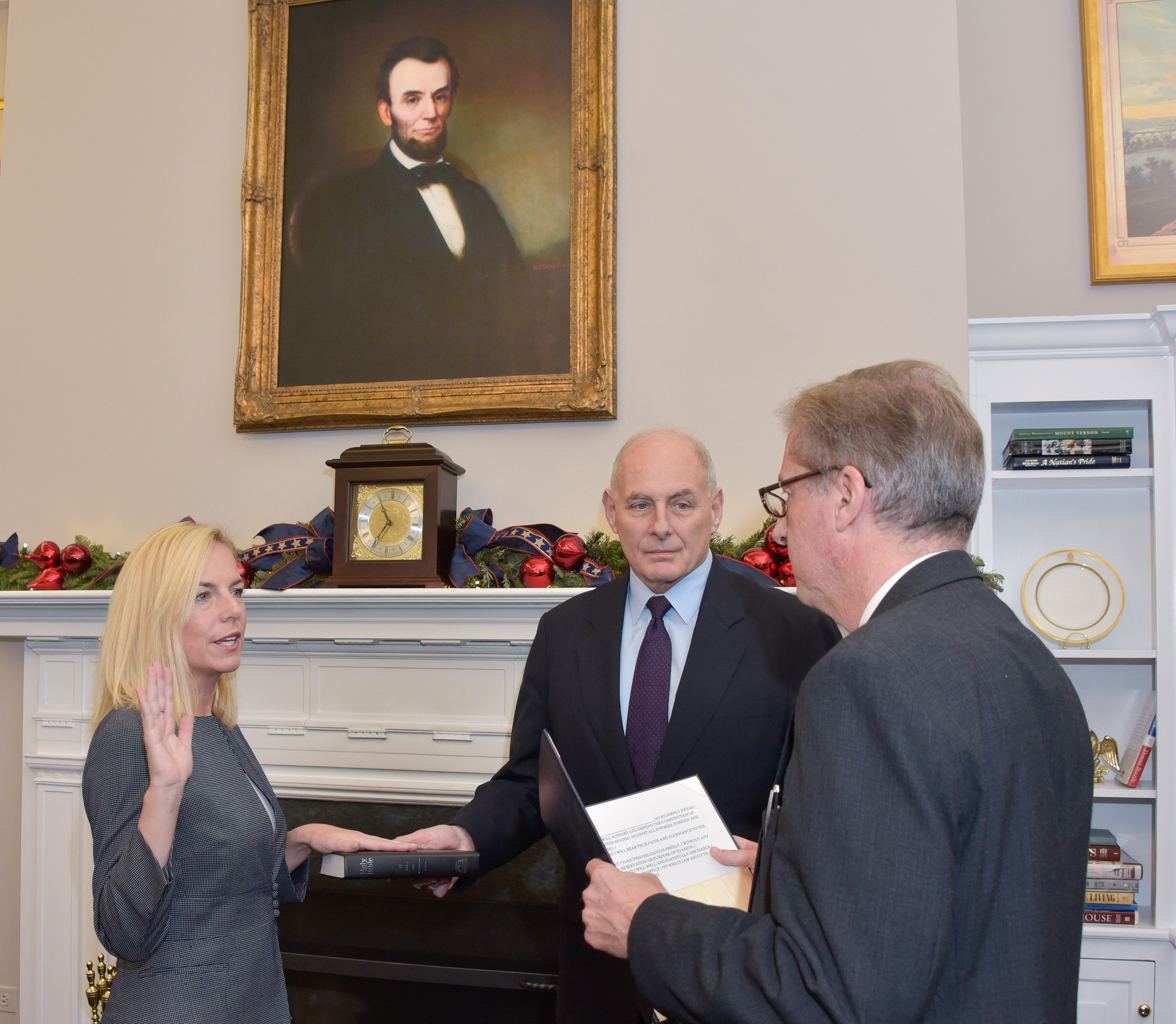
Kirstjen Nielsen taking the oath of office as the sixth U.S. Secretary of Homeland Security

On October 11, 2017, President Donald Trump nominated Nielsen to be the new United States secretary of homeland security, replacing acting secretary Elaine Duke. On December 5, 2017, the Senate confirmed her nomination, by a 62–37 vote. On December 6, 2017, she was sworn in as secretary of homeland security.

=== Tenure ===
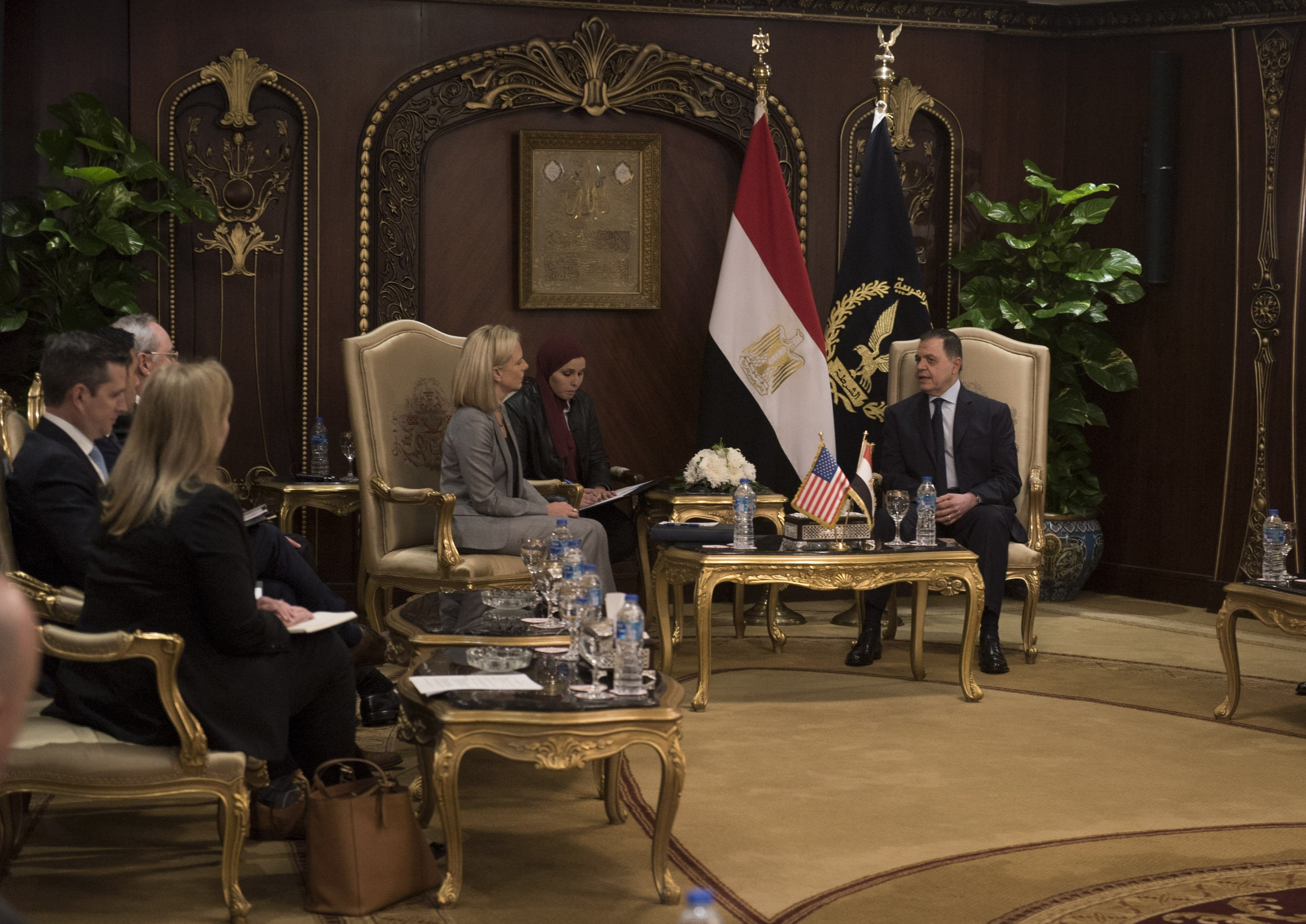
Kirstjen Nielsen meets with Sherif Fathi (Egyptian minister of the Interior) in Cairo 2018.

On January 16, 2018, Nielsen testified before the United States Senate in favor of merit, rather than family, based immigration. She was questioned about an earlier meeting at the White House in which press reports and Senator Dick Durbin related that the president had used the word "shithole" to describe African countries, as well as disparaging remarks about Haiti. Nielsen said, "I did not hear that word used, no sir," although she said she heard "tough language" that was impassioned. During the same hearing, Senator Patrick Leahy asked her whether Norway was a predominantly white country. Nielsen appeared to hesitate before answering with, "I actually do not know that, sir." She added, "But I imagine that is the case." Nielsen was criticized by Senator Cory Booker for not recalling or speaking out against Trump's disparaging remarks which Booker characterized as bigoted. Following the hearing, Nielsen expressed her disappointment in the amount of attention being paid to the White House meeting.

From March to December 2018, Nielsen sat on the Federal Commission on School Safety.

On March 23, 2018, it was reported that Nielsen agreed with the enactment of the Presidential Memorandum for the Secretary of Defense and the Secretary of Homeland Security Regarding Military Service by Transgender Individuals.

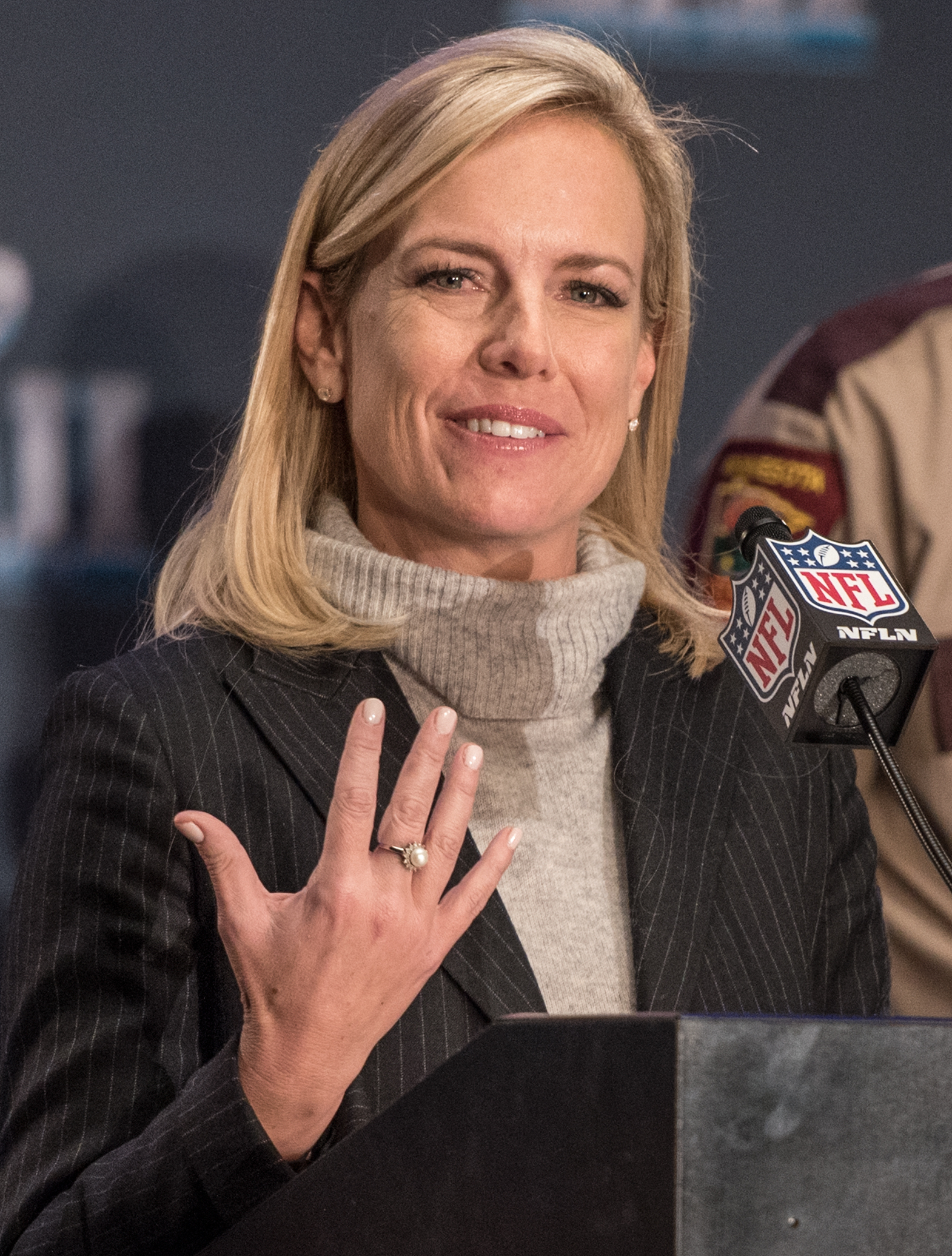
Nielsen at a press conference during Super Bowl LII, February 2018

At a May 2018 congressional hearing, Nielsen said that she was unaware of the intelligence community's conclusion that Russia sought to interfere in the 2016 presidential election to help candidate Trump get elected. An assessment by the FBI, CIA and NSA in January 2017 was that the Russian preference was clearly to help Trump win; this assessment was mirrored in a bipartisan report by the Senate Intelligence Committee released days prior to Nielsen's testimony. Nielsen said that she had not seen the intelligence community briefing that Russia had tried to interfere in the 2016 election. A week later, Nielsen backtracked, saying that she agreed with the intelligence community's assessment.

In July 2018, Nielsen said there were no signs that Russia was targeting the 2018 midterm elections in the same "scale or scope" as it did in 2016. At the Aspen Security Forum, Aspen, Colorado, during an interview by Peter Alexander of NBC on July 19, 2018, Nielsen stated that Russians had absolutely interfered in the United States presidential election in 2016. When Alexander asked if Russians had interfered in favor of Donald Trump, Nielsen responded, "I have not seen any evidence that the attempts to interfere in our election infrastructure was to favor a particular political party. I think what we have seen on the foreign influence side is they were attempting to intervene and cause chaos on both sides." Prior to this on July 16, 2018, at the joint press conference in Helsinki after 2018 Russia–United States Summit, Jeff Mason from Reuters asked President Putin, "Did you want President Trump to win the election and did you direct any of your officials to help him do that?" Putin's response was: "Yes, I wanted him to win. Because he talked about bringing the U.S.–Russia relationship back to normal."

During the same interview at the Aspen Security Forum when Alexander further asked whether the president has made countering white supremacy a priority, Nielsen replied that he wanted the DHS to prevent "any form of violence" threatening Americans. Referring to President Trump's response to clashes between the white supremacists and counter-protesters at Unite the Right rally in Charlottesville, Virginia on August 12, 2017, Alexander asked, "But in the comments that are obviously highly publicized when he [President Trump] placed blame in his words on both side, does that make your job harder when [p]resident says things that at least in those communities are viewed as he has got our [white supremacists'] back?" She said, "I think what is interesting about that is we saw, and I think we continue to learn— maybe there was different, whether it was foreign influence or different purposeful attempts to get both sides, if you will, aggressively pitted against each other." She later added that "it is not that one side is right, one side is wrong. Anybody that is advocating violence, we need to work to mitigate."

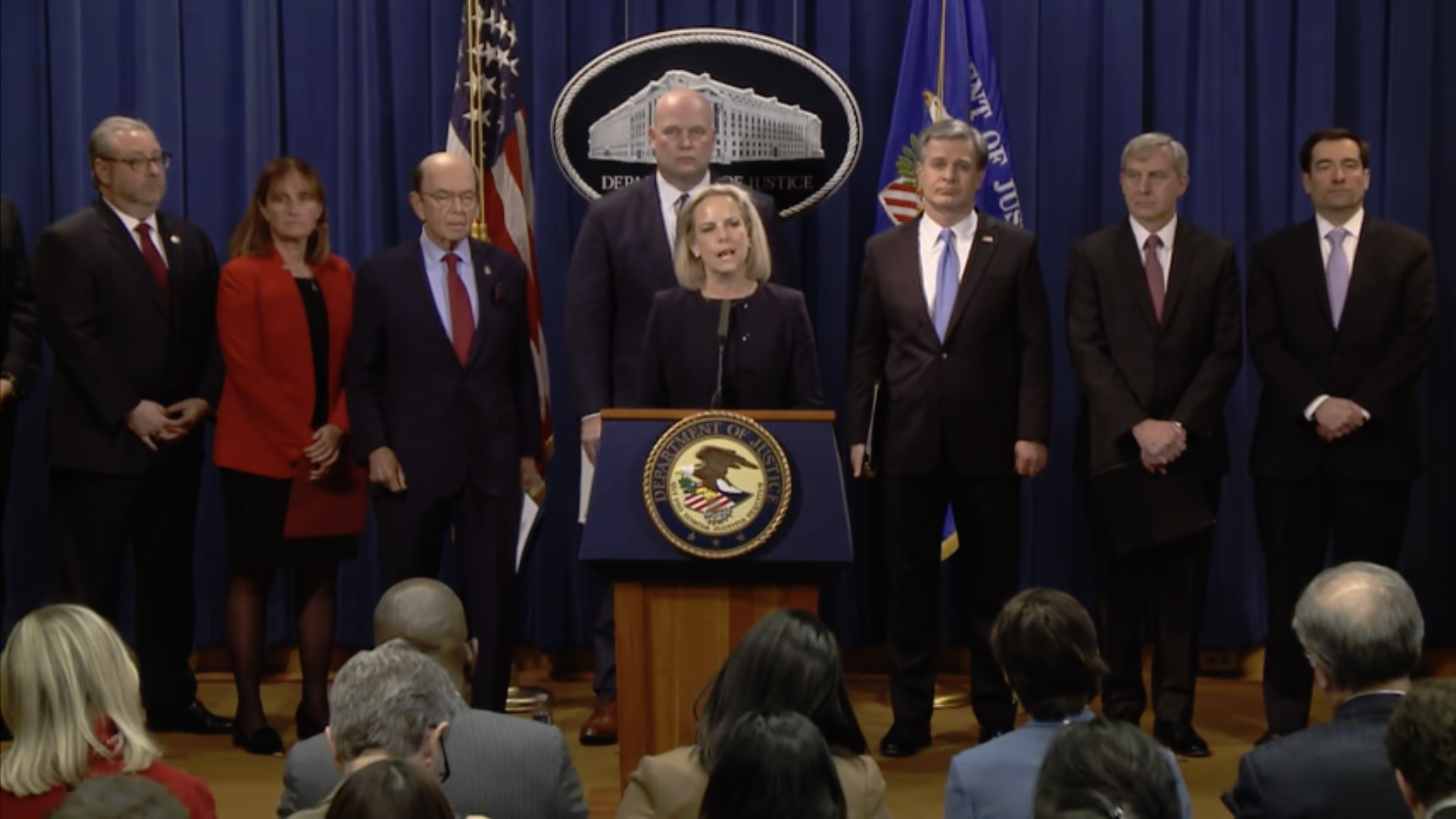
U.S. Department of Justice, Department of Homeland Security, Department of Commerce and Federal Bureau of Investigation announces 23 criminal charges against PRC's Huawei and Wanzhou Meng

In October 2018, Nielsen said that China has become a major threat to the U.S. Nielsen also confirmed, in an answer to a question from a senator, that China is trying to influence U.S. elections. On October 22, 15 days prior to the 2018 mid-term elections, President Trump met with Nielsen and White House staff and demanded "extreme action" to stop migrants at the southern border. Later that afternoon at a meeting of top Homeland Security officials, Customs and Border Protections representatives proposed deploying a microwave weapon against approaching migrants. Nielsen told an aide at the meeting that she would not authorize the use of the device and that its use should never be brought up to her again.

In January 2019, Nielsen, Acting Attorney General Matthew Whitaker, Commerce Secretary Wilbur Ross, and FBI director Christopher Wray announced 23 criminal charges (including financial fraud, money laundering, conspiracy to defraud the United States, theft of trade secret technology, provided bonus to workers who stole confidential information from companies around the world, wire fraud, obstruction of justice and sanctions violations) against Chinese tech giant Huawei and its CFO Meng Wanzhou.

==== Family separation policy ====
On May 7, 2018, Secretary Nielsen, despite her objection, officially enacted a controversial practice of the Trump administration's policy of separating parents and children accused of crossing over the U.S.–Mexico border illegally.

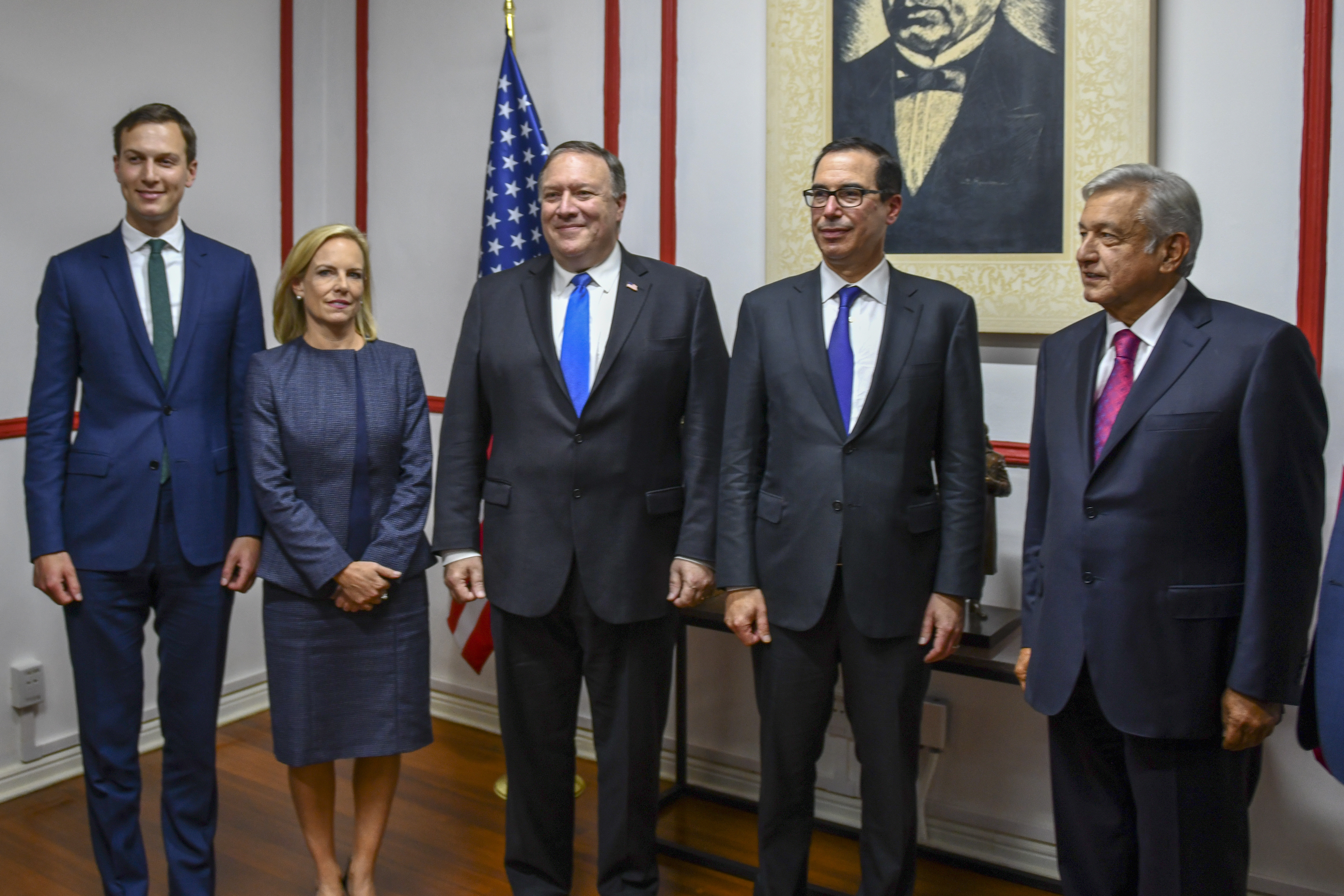
Nielsen, Secretary Pompeo, Secretary Mnuchin and Advisor Kushner with Mexican president-elect López Obrador, July 13, 2018

At a congressional hearing on May 15, 2018, Nielsen testified that she would enforce the then-newly enacted Trump administration policy of separating parents and children who crossed over the U.S.–Mexico border, noting that similar separations happened in criminal courts "every day."

In June 2018, Nielsen stated that the Trump administration did not maintain a policy of separating migrant families at the Southern border; The Washington Post fact-checker described Nielsen's claim as false and "Orwellian." At that point, the Trump administration had in six weeks separated approximately 2,000 migrant children from their parents. Contrary to Nielsen's claims, the DHS website showed that a policy of family separation was in place.

On June 18, 2018, Nielsen defended the policy at a sheriffs' conference but said the administration had asked Congress "to allow us to keep families together while they are detained" as an alternative. "We cannot detain children with their parents so we must either release both the parents and the children – this is the historic 'get out of jail free' practice of the previous administration – or the adult and the minor will be separated as the result of prosecuting the adult. Those are the only two options. Surely it is the beginning of the unraveling of democracy when the body who makes the laws, rather than changing them, asks the body who enforces the laws not to enforce the laws. That cannot be the answer." Three days earlier, the DHS said that it had separated 1,995 immigrant children from 1,940 adults, which it described as "alleged adult parents," at the border between mid-April and the end of May. Because the law forbids children from being kept in criminal detention facilities, they are separated from their parents.

Nielsen held a press briefing with White House spokesperson Sarah Huckabee Sanders in June 2018 amid growing public outcry about the family separation policy. Nielsen accused the media and members of Congress of mischaracterizing the administration's policy. She dismissed the suggestion that the administration was using family separations as political leverage to force Congress to support Trump's broader immigration agenda or to deter migrants from coming to the United States. In doing so, she contradicted comments made earlier by Attorney General Jeff Sessions, Chief of Staff John Kelly and senior adviser Stephen Miller. She got very little support from administration officials such as Miller, who was openly against her. John Kelly, who had strongly recommended her to Trump, was her biggest advocate amongst the people who talk to Trump the most.

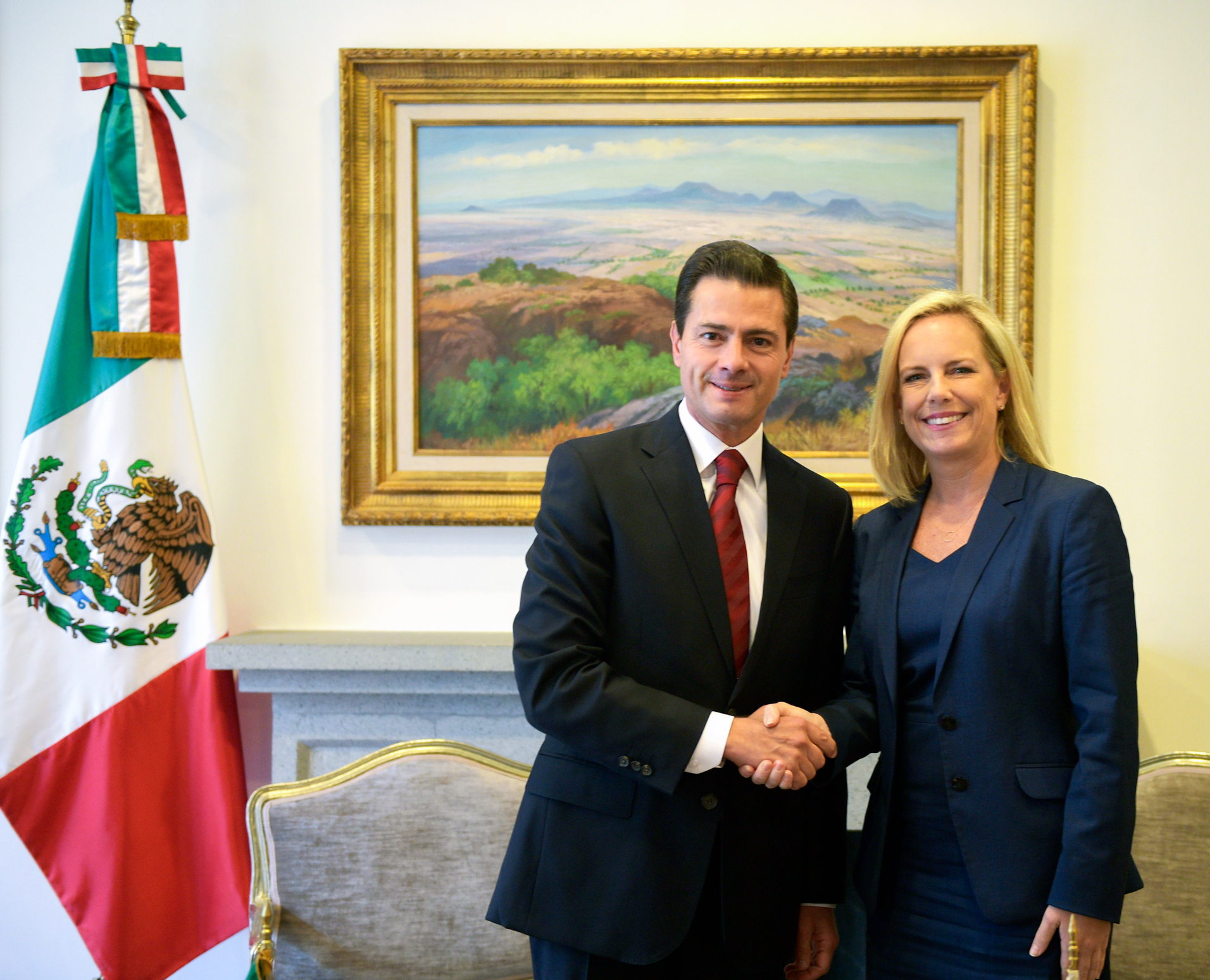
Nielsen with Mexican president Enrique Peña Nieto, October 4, 2018

On June 20, 2018, after repeatedly arguing that the administration could not sign an executive order to end family separations, she was present at Trump's signing of an executive order ending his "zero-tolerance" policy of separating of children from families. Sources told Politico that Nielsen had privately pushed for this executive order behind the scenes while at the same time saying publicly that the executive order could not be created.

In September 2018, The Intercept reported that Nielsen had previously personally authorized the family separation policy after receiving an April 23, 2018, memo by the heads of three federal immigration agencies (U.S. Citizenship and Immigration Services, Customs and Border Protection, and Immigration and Customs Enforcement) recommending the family separation policy for the express purpose of deterring migration. At the time of the report, Nielsen had avoided attributing deterrence as the purpose of the policy.

Nielsen testified before Congress that "every parent" had the choice to take their child back and that the parents who left their children behind did so voluntarily. A 2021 investigation by the Department of Homeland Security Inspector General found that parents were forcibly deported without their children, which contradicted Nielsen's claims that the parents had a choice.

In 2019, Sen. Jeff Merkley (D-Ore.) wrote in a letter to FBI director Christopher A. Wray: “...the FBI should immediately investigate whether Secretary Nielsen’s statements [to Congress] violate 18 U.S. Code § 1621, 18 U.S.C § 1001, or any other relevant federal statutes that prohibit perjury and false statements to Congress.” Other Democratic representatives also echoed the same accusations. Nielsen has repeatedly denied the allegations of perjury.

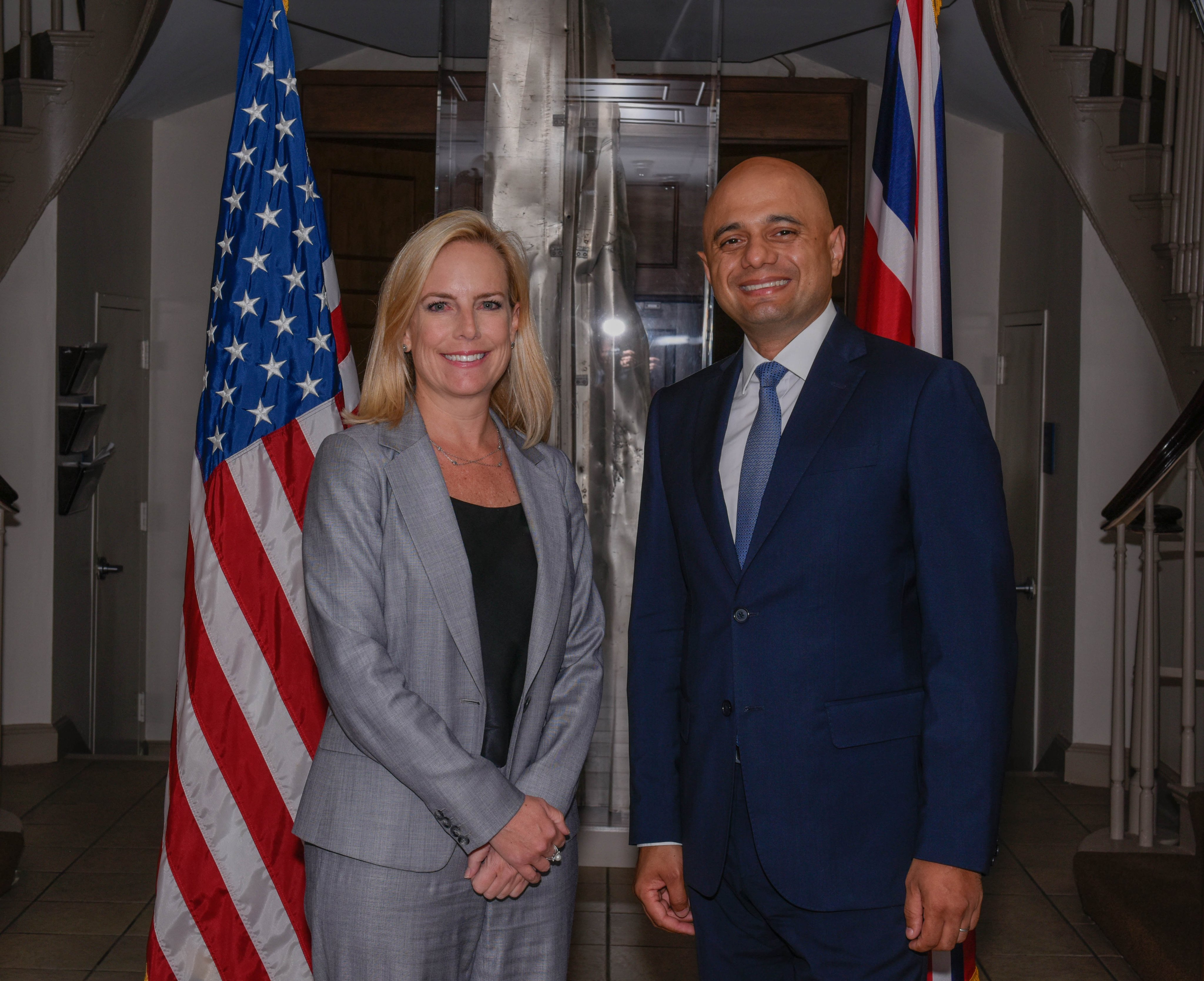
Kirstjen Nielsen with UK Home Secretary, Sajid Javid, May 2018

In October 2019, Nielsen defended the family separation policy, saying "I don’t regret enforcing the law."

==== Border incidents ====
During Nielsen's tenure, several incidents at the U.S.–Mexico border between law enforcement and migrants seeking passage attracted international attention and prompted criticism of the Trump administration's approach towards enforcement.

===== Border agents' use of tear gas =====
On Sunday, November 25, 2018, there was an incident at the San Ysidro Port of Entry between California and Mexico. Groups of Central American migrant caravans tried to forcibly cross the border into the United States. Some of them threw rocks at U.S. Border Patrol agents, who responded by firing tear gas into the crowd which included families with small children. The use of tear gas in this situation was strongly criticized. In a statement Nielsen said that this caravan had acted violently in the past and "I refuse to believe that anyone honestly maintains that attacking law enforcement with rocks and projectiles is acceptable." She added that in some cases the women and children in the caravan were being used by the organizers as "human shields" when they confronted law enforcement. She asserted "at this point we have confirmed that there are over 600 convicted criminals traveling with the caravan flow." An earlier "Fact Sheet" about the caravan, released by the DHS, had stated that "over 270 individuals along the caravan route have criminal histories" and that "Mexican officials have also publicly stated that criminal groups have infiltrated the caravan." It also asserted that the caravan included individuals from more than 20 countries. However, that statement was challenged by a Washington Post fact checker, who said it was oddly worded in such a way as to suggest the people referenced were not actually part of the caravan.

===== Deaths of migrant children in CBP custody =====
In another instance, Jakelin Caal, a 7-year-old girl from Guatemala, died in the custody of U.S. Customs and Border Protection, an agency of the Department of Homeland Security, on December 8, 2018. A few weeks later on Christmas Eve, December 24, 2018, Felipe Gómez Alonso, an 8-year-old boy from Guatemala, died in the custody of CBP. In a formal statement released on December 26, 2018, Nielsen called the death "deeply concerning and heartbreaking" and cited U.S. immigration system failings for a growing border crisis. She said she had ordered her agency to bolster medical screenings of children at the southwest border and had enlisted the medical corps of the United States Coast Guard to provide an assessment of CBP's medical programs. The secretary also said that she would travel to the border to personally observe the screenings. Nielsen said that the changing immigration dynamic had been spurred by "an immigration system that rewards parents for sending their children across the border alone," without requiring the adults to face "consequences for their actions." In the same statement released on December 26, 2018, Nielsen added, "Smugglers, traffickers, and their own parents put these minors at risk by embarking on the dangerous and arduous journey north. [...] As a result of bad judicial rulings from activist judges and inaction by Congress, we are seeing a flood of family units and unaccompanied alien children."

==== Asylum request from Anastasia Vashukevich ====
After her arrest in Pattaya, Thailand, on February 25, 2018, Anastasia Vashukevich immediately requested asylum in the United States because she feared for her life if Russia became involved. She stated that she had been "repressed by Russia" and had fled Russia for Thailand. Vashukevich had videos and audio recordings of "crymes of Russian government" and wished to give these recordings both video and audio to United States authorities. A hand written note signed by Vashukevich requesting asylum in the United States was given to a Ukrainian American, Pavlo Yunko, who delivered it to the United States embassy in Bangkok. A spokesperson for the embassy, Jillian Bonnardeaux, stated that the matter was referred to the United States Department of Homeland Security (DHS) because all matters regarding asylum in the United States are handled by DHS, however, no one contacted Vashukevich from DHS. On February 28, 2018, the Radio Free Europe website displayed photos of the handwritten asylum request signed by Vashukevich. Vashukevich stated that she had information about the Russian interference in the 2016 United States elections. (Note: The Mueller Report was submitted to Barr on March 22, 2019.)

==== Politicization of DHS ====
In September 2020, whistleblower Brian Murphy alleged that he and his colleagues was asked to “ensure the intelligence assessments he produced for Secretary Nielsen’s review supported the policy argument that large numbers of [known or suspected terrorists] were entering the United States through the southwest border" and that in December 2018 and March 2019 Nielsen gave false congressional testimony about the number of known or suspected terrorists crossing the southern border, conflating them with "special interest aliens" to support the administration's border wall proposal. Nielsen's attorney called the allegations "demonstrably false," and NBC News reported that the transcript of her December 2018 testimony showed she did distinguish between the two categories. Murphy's attorney issued a clarification two days later, retracting the claim that Nielsen gave false testimony to Congress but maintaining that inflated figures were presented at a White House meeting she led.

=== Resignation ===
In May 2018, The New York Times reported that Nielsen considered resigning after President Trump berated her during a cabinet meeting for what he described as her failure to secure U.S. borders. The newspaper reported that there was tension between Nielsen and Trump after she and other DHS officials resisted Trump's call to separate undocumented immigrant parents from their children while in custody. The reporting was confirmed to Politico and Reuters by a source at the DHS. Nielsen denied that she threatened to resign.

Nielsen submitted her resignation as secretary of homeland security on April 7, 2019, after a White House meeting with President Trump, two days after the president announced he wanted to go in a "tougher" direction on immigration. She had cut short a week-long trip to Europe where she was going to discuss cybersecurity and terror threats with senior United Kingdom and Swedish government officials.

Trump also had tweeted, on April 7, that Kevin McAleenan, the U.S. Customs and Border Protection Commissioner, would become acting secretary. Trump announced that intention following the resignation of Nielsen on April 7, 2019. Legally, under 6 U.S.C. §113(g), the role would have fallen to then Acting Deputy Secretary Claire Grady. That succession was made legal after Trump forced Grady, the next in line, to resign on April 9. In a tweet, Nielsen had said that she had agreed to remain in her position until April 10, 2019 "to assist with an orderly transition and ensure that key DHS missions are not impacted."

On April 5, immigration and civil rights groups had urged companies listed in the Fortune 500 not to hire senior Trump administration officials who were involved in planning, carrying out, or defending the separation of migrant children from their parents. On April 8, a petition aimed at scholars and media figures began circulating, with signers vowing not to "associate myself in any way" with any think tank or university department that employs Nielsen.

In a piece summarizing Nielsen's tenure at DHS, Vox's Dara Lind wrote that Nielsen had been "arguably the most aggressive secretary in the department's short history".

=== Post-DHS career ===
In October 2019, the Trump administration announced that Nielsen had been appointed to the National Infrastructure Advisory Council. Her term ended at the end of the first Trump administration.

She is the president of Lighthouse Strategies, LLC.

In January 2024, D-Wave Systems (a quantum computing company) announced that Nielsen will serve as a member of the board of directors of the company.

In April 2025, the international law firm Pillsbury Winthrop Shaw Pittman announced that Nielsen would join the group as a Senior Policy Advisor. Also in April 2025, Nielsen joined the ransomware company Halcyon as a Strategic Advisor.

== See also ==
- List of female United States Cabinet members

== Notes ==
Political offices
Preceded by John F. Kelly	United States Secretary of Homeland Security; 2017–2019	Succeeded by Kevin McAleenan; Acting
U.S. order of precedence (ceremonial)
Preceded by Alexander Acosta as Former U.S. Cabinet Member	Order of precedence of the United States as Former U.S. Cabinet Member	Succeeded by Alex Azar as Former U.S. Cabinet Member
