= Border Patrol Academy =

Training academy for the U.S. Border Patrol

- Headquarters: Artesia, New Mexico; 32°51′34″N 104°24′58″W

The CBP Border Patrol Academy is a training academy for future agents of the United States Border Patrol. It is located in Artesia, New Mexico.

Located at the Federal Law Enforcement Training Center FLETC Artesia formerly site of the College of Artesia. FLETC Artesia officially opened on October 1, 1989. It consist of a 3,620-acre site with a full range of training facilities, dormitories, classrooms, and one emergency driver training range. Is a six-month training program includes driving, concealed carry, immigration law, and Spanish language. Since 2004, all initial entry training for the Border Patrol was finally unified at the Artesia facility.

== See also ==
- Federal Law Enforcement Training Centers
