= Troy Edgar =

American government official (born 1960s)

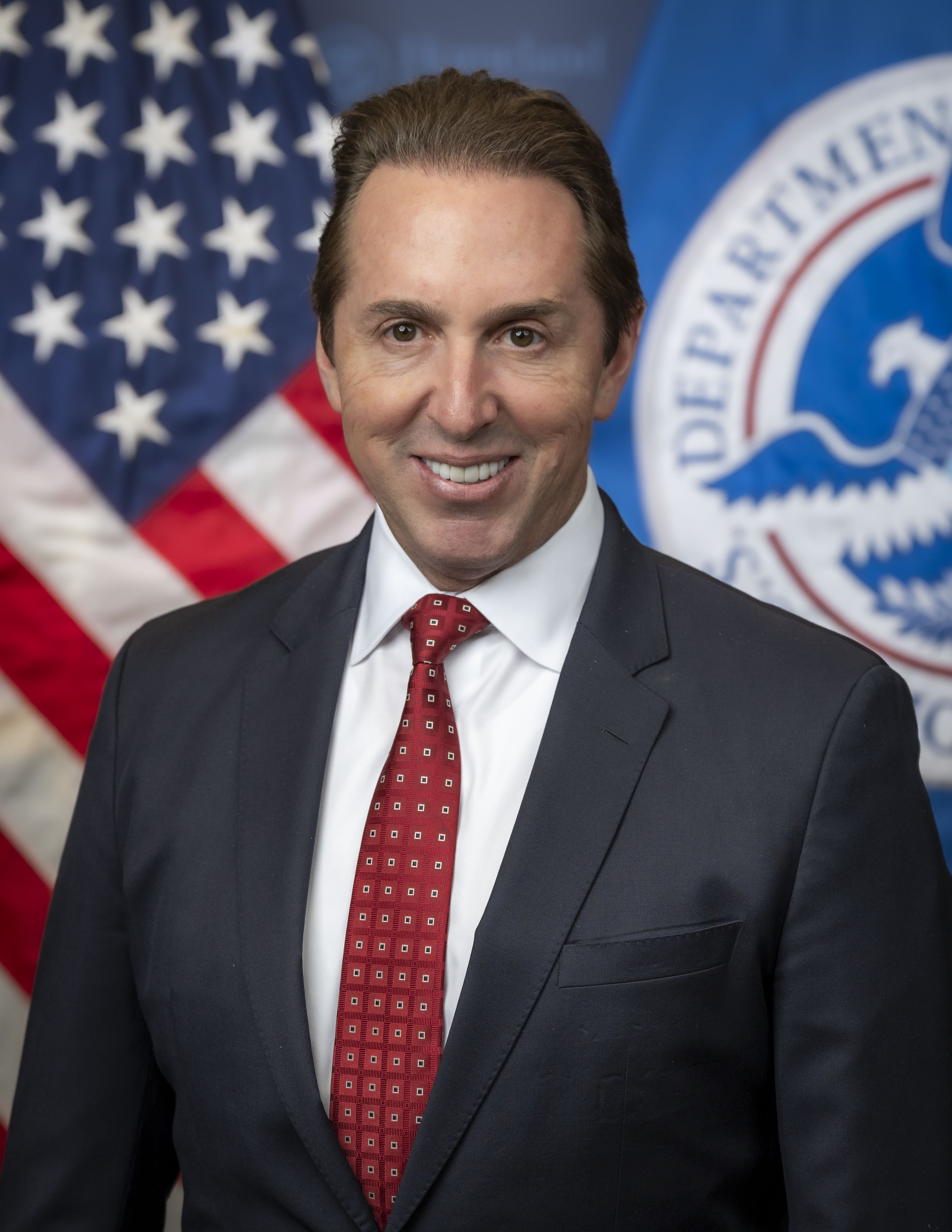
- Official portrait, 2025

9th United States Deputy Secretary of Homeland Security
- Incumbent
- Assumed office March 8, 2025
- President: Donald Trump
- Secretary: Kristi Noem; Markwayne Mullin
- Preceded by: John Tien

Chief Financial Officer of the United States Department of Homeland Security
- In office May 14, 2020 – January 20, 2021
- President: Donald Trump
- Succeeded by: Jeff Rezmovic

Mayor of Los Alamitos, California
- In office March 19, 2018 – March 27, 2019
- Preceded by: Shelley Hasselbrink
- Succeeded by: Warren Kusumoto
- In office May 9, 2012 – October 6, 2014
- Preceded by: Marilynn Poe
- Succeeded by: Gerri L. Graham-Mejia
- In office March 2, 2009 – June 9, 2010
- Preceded by: Dean Grose
- Succeeded by: Marilynn Poe

Personal details
- Born: 1966 or 1967 (age 59–60) Los Alamitos, California, U.S.
- Spouse: Betty Edgar
- Children: 3
- Education: University of Southern California (BS, MBA)
- Website: www.troyedgar.com

Military service
- Allegiance: United States
- Branch/service: United States Navy
- Years of service: 1984–1988

Troy D. Edgar (born 1966 or 1967) is an American politician, business executive, security official, and Navy veteran who has served as the ninth United States deputy secretary of homeland security since 2025. He was nominated by President Donald Trump to be the United States Ambassador to El Salvador, however his nomination was withdrawn in April 2026.

== Early life ==
Edgar is from Los Alamitos, California. He served in the United States Navy and received bachelor's and master's degrees in business from the University of Southern California. Edgar owns Global Conductor Construction Corp. and Global Conductor Inc.

== Career ==
Edgar was elected to the city council of Los Alamitos in 2006. During his 12 year tenure on the council he was elected mayor of the city three times in 2009, 2012 and 2018. He also served as chair of the Orange County Sanitation District for two years. It was under Edgar's final tenure as mayor that Los Alamitos established a city ordinance opposed to California's 2017 SB-54 law. Edgar appeared on national media to speak out against it and was invited to the White House on several occasions.

In March 2019, Edgar was nominated as Chief Financial Officer of the United States Department of Homeland Security.

=== U.S. Deputy Secretary of Homeland Security (2025–present) ===
On March 8, 2025, Edgar was sworn in as the ninth United States Deputy Secretary of Homeland Security by Secretary Kristi Noem.

=== Nomination for U.S. Ambassador to El Salvador (2026) ===
On January 29, 2026, President Donald Trump nominated Edgar to serve as United States Ambassador to El Salvador. His nomination was withdrawn on April 13, 2026.

== Personal life ==
Edgar, his wife Betty and three sons live in Los Alamitos. He hosts a podcast called Ameritocracy.

Political offices
Preceded by John Tien	United States Deputy Secretary of Homeland Security; 2025–present	Incumbent
