= Russell Deyo =

American lawyer

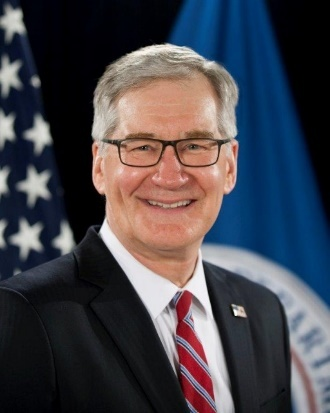

United States Deputy Secretary of Homeland Security
- Acting
- In office November 1, 2016 – April 4, 2017
- President: Barack Obama; Donald Trump
- Preceded by: Alejandro Mayorkas
- Succeeded by: Elaine Duke

Personal details
- Education: Dartmouth College; Georgetown University Law Center (JD)

Russell C. Deyo is an American lawyer and government official. Appointed Under Secretary for Management at the Department of Homeland Security (DHS) on May 11, 2015, he became the Acting Deputy Secretary of Homeland Security (DHS) on November 1, 2016.

== Early life and education ==
Deyo graduated from Dartmouth College. He earned his J.D. from Georgetown University Law Center. At Georgetown, he was executive editor of the school's International Law Journal.

== Career ==
From 1977 to 1978, Deyo was an attorney at the New York City law firm Patterson, Belknap, Webb & Tyler. He was subsequently an Assistant U.S. Attorney for the District of New Jersey from 1978 to 1985. The last three years he was Chief of Special Prosecutions.

Deyo worked at Johnson & Johnson for 27 years, with positions such as general counsel and vice president of administration. He oversaw human resources, procurement, contributions, philanthropy, legal affairs and compliance. He was also on the management boards of several Johnson & Johnson operating companies. According to DHS, he oversaw "the Office of Corporate Secretary, Government Affairs and Policy, Privacy, Security and Aviation." For 16 years he was a member of the Johnson & Johnson executive committee. He retired from the company in 2012.

Deyo became Under Secretary for Management at DHS on May 11, 2015, with oversight of the department's management programs. He served as the Acting Deputy Secretary of Homeland Security from November 1, 2016, to April 4, 2017.

Political offices
Preceded by Alejandro Mayorkas	United States Deputy Secretary of Homeland Security; Acting; 2016–2017	Succeeded by Elaine Duke
