= Under Secretary of Homeland Security for Management =

Senior official in the U.S. Department of Homeland Security

United States Under Secretary of Homeland Security for Management
- Incumbent; Brian J. Cavanaugh since August 10, 2026
- United States Department of Homeland Security
- Constituting instrument: 6 U.S.C. § 113
- Formation: 2003
- Website: Official website

The under secretary of homeland security for management is a high level civilian official in the United States Department of Homeland Security. The under secretary, as head of the Management Directorate at DHS, is the principal staff assistant and adviser to both the secretary of homeland security and the deputy secretary of homeland security for all aspects of DHS administration, finance, and personnel issues.

The under secretary is appointed from civilian life by the president with the consent of the Senate to serve at the pleasure of the president. Brian J. Cavanaugh is the current under secretary for management.

== Overview ==
The under secretary of homeland security for management (USM), as the chief operating officer of the Department, is responsible for Department-wide administrative support services and oversight for all support functions, including: IT, budget and financial management, procurement and acquisition, human capital, security, and administrative services. The under secretary also provides the overarching management structure for the Department to deliver customer services, while eliminating redundancies and reducing support costs in order to more effectively and efficiently run the Department in a unified manner

With the rank of Under Secretary, the USM is a Level II position within the Executive Schedule. Since January 2021, the annual rate of pay for Level II is $203,700.

== Reporting officials ==
Officials reporting to the USM include:

- Deputy Under Secretary of Homeland Security for Management
  - DHS Chief Financial Officer
  - DHS Chief Security Officer
  - DHS Chief Human Capital Officer
  - DHS Chief Readiness Support Officer
  - DHS Chief Procurement Officer
  - DHS Chief Information Officer

== Budget ==
DHS Management Directorate Budget, FY16–18 ($ in thousands)
Line Item	FY16 Revised Enacted ^{[4]}	FY17 Enacted ^{[4]}	FY18 Request
Operations and Support	737,848	594,742	696,131
Procurement, Construction, and Improvements	196,733	73,307	69,988
Research and Development	2,500	2,500	2,545
Total Budget	937,081	670,549	768,664

^{4} Amounts include Title 5 funding for DHS HQ Consolidation, Financial Systems Modernization, Cyber Security fund, and rescissions, where applicable.
