= 2019–2021 Department of Homeland Security appointment disputes =

U.S. governmental disputes

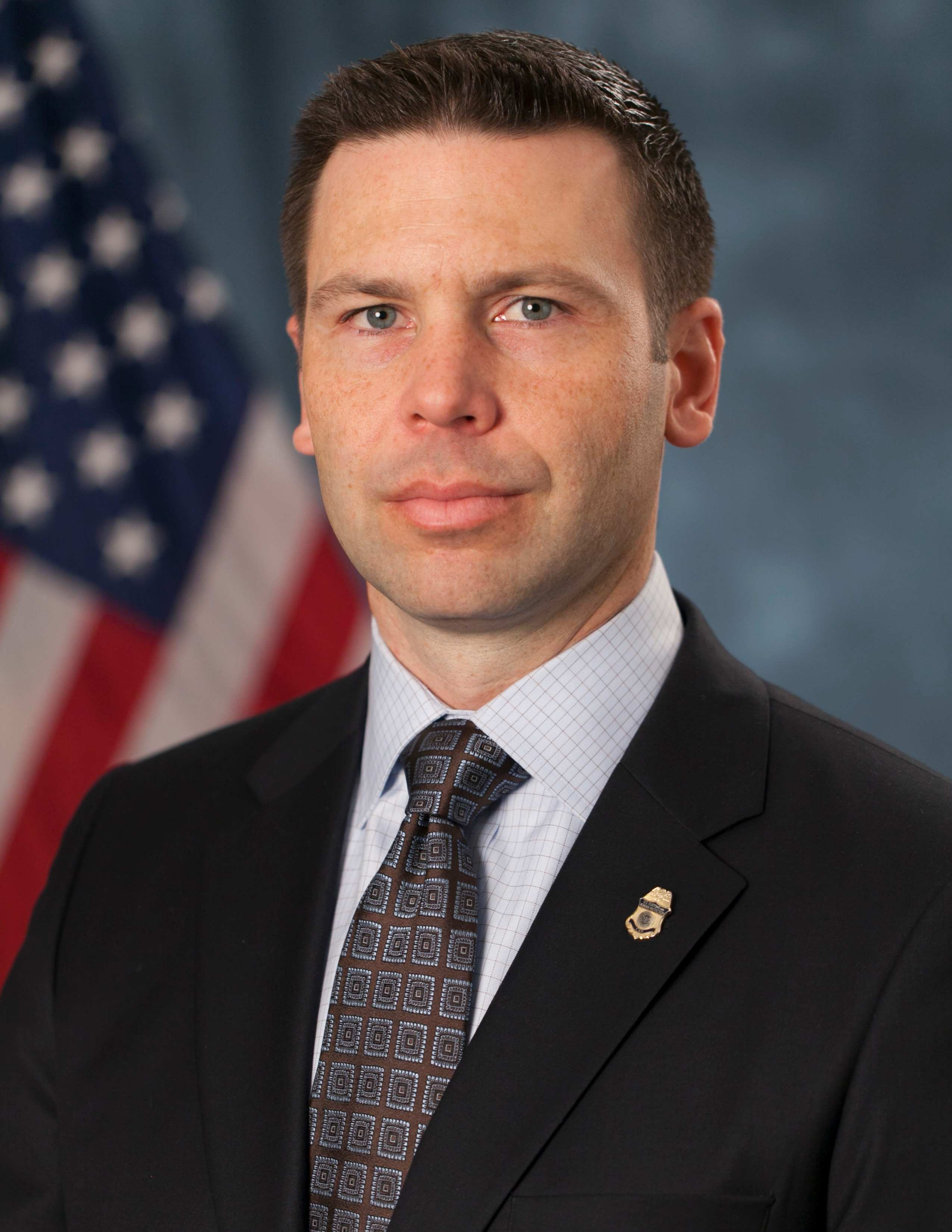
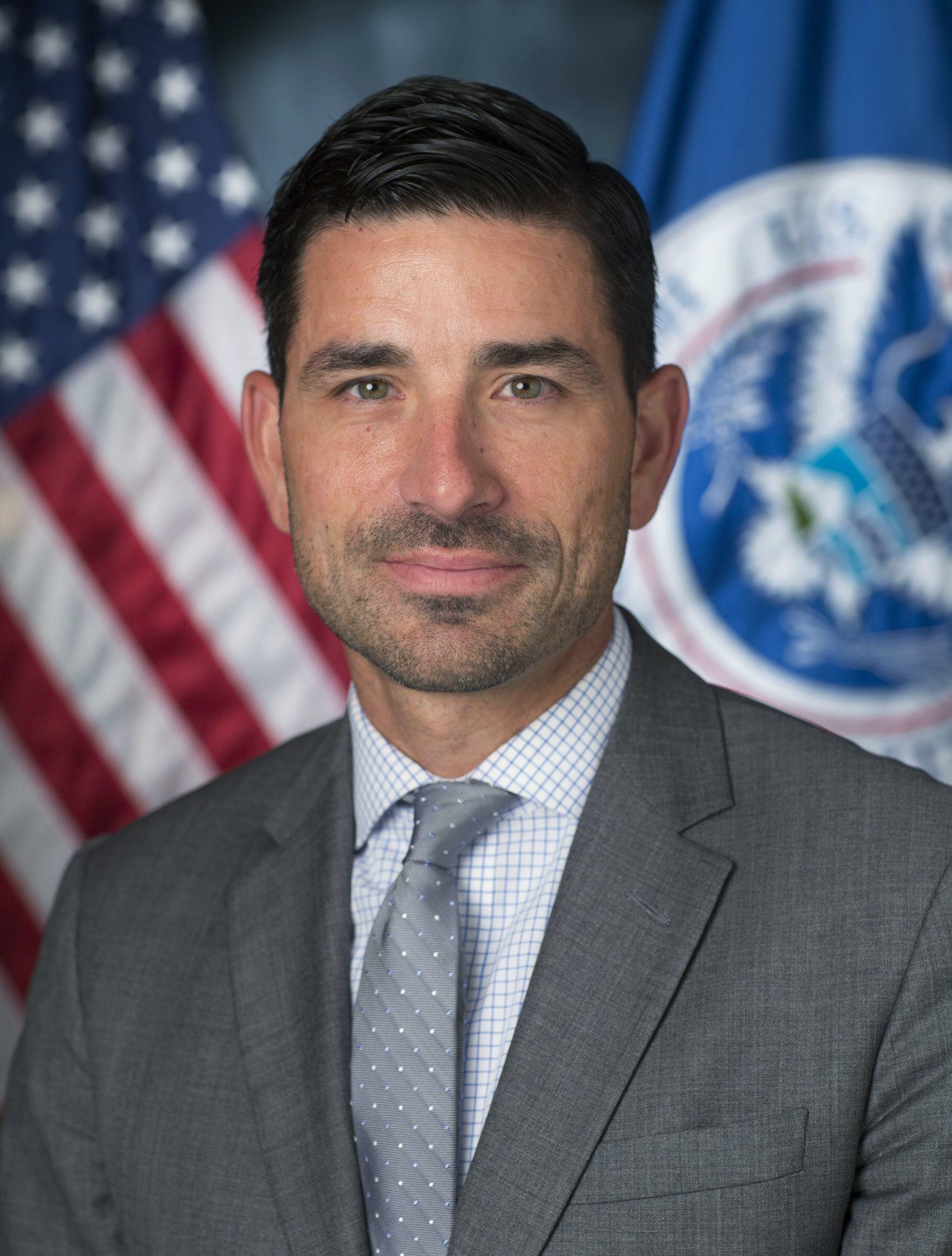
Kevin McAleenan (left) served as Acting Secretary of Homeland Security in 2019, and was followed in that position by Chad Wolf (right). Both appointments as acting secretary were found invalid by the Government Accountability Office in August 2020, and by a federal judge in November 2020.

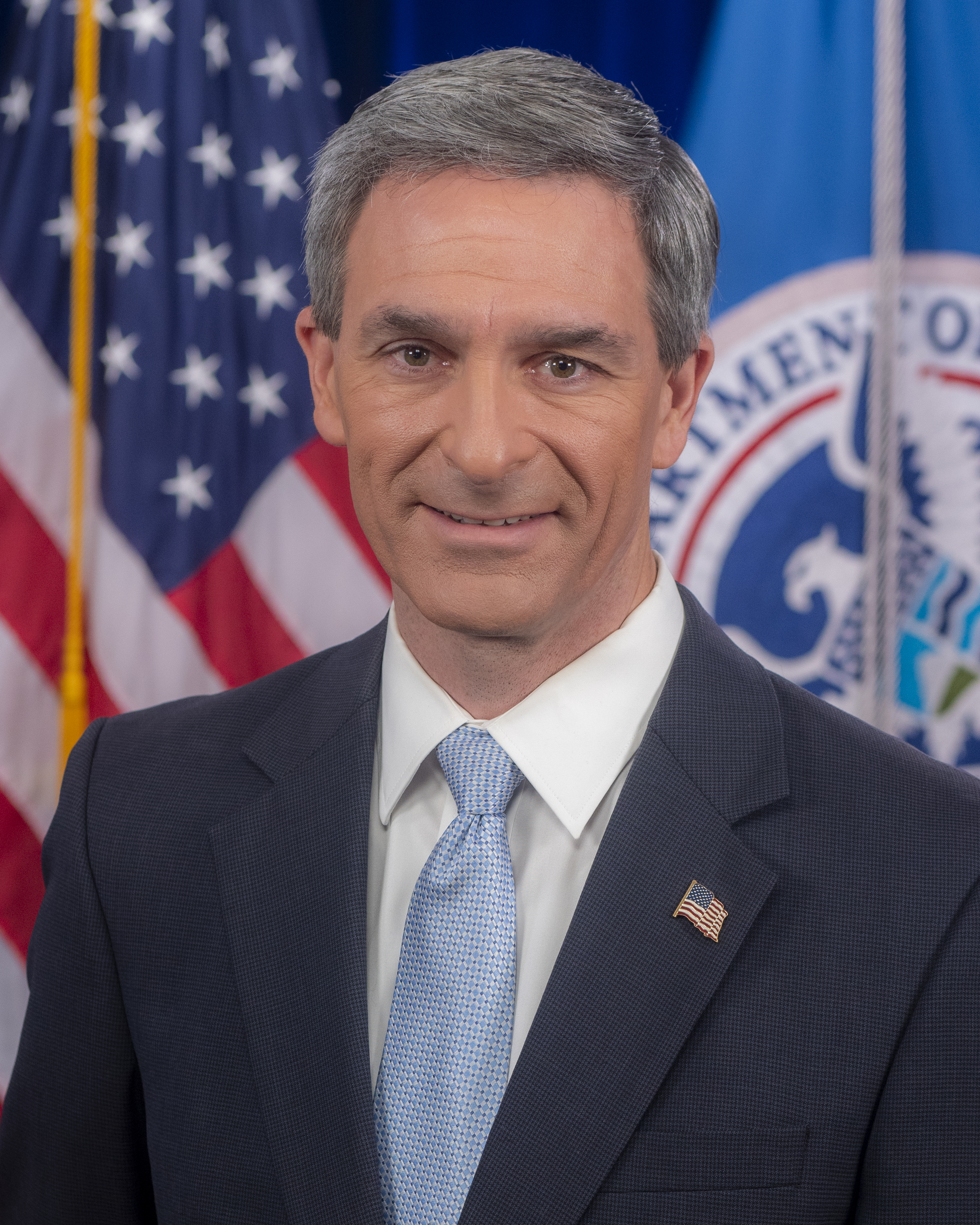
Ken Cuccinelli was appointed acting Director of U.S. Citizenship and Immigration Services in June 2019, and Acting Deputy Secretary of Homeland Security in November 2019. The first appointment was ruled invalid by a federal judge in March 2020; the second was found invalid by GAO in August 2020.

Beginning in 2019, multiple appointments of acting officials in the United States Department of Homeland Security (DHS) were questioned on the basis of whether the appointments were legal under the Federal Vacancies Reform Act of 1998 and the Homeland Security Act of 2002. After the departure of Secretary Kirstjen Nielsen in April 2019, the Trump administration did not formally nominate a new secretary to be confirmed by the Senate, relying on acting postings.

The disputed appointments were those of Kevin McAleenan and Chad Wolf as Acting Secretary of Homeland Security, and Ken Cuccinelli as Senior Official Performing the Duties of both the Deputy Secretary of Homeland Security and the Director of United States Citizenship and Immigration Services (USCIS). The dispute on the Secretary and Deputy Secretary appointments centered on the fact that the issued text of an amendment to the order of succession deviated from the intention of then-Secretary Nielsen, placing a different person than expected next in line. The dispute on the USCIS appointment centered on whether a newly created Principal Deputy Director position was validly the "first assistant" to the Director under the Federal Vacancies Reform Act.

On March 1, 2020, the District Court for the District of Columbia ruled that Cuccinelli was not lawfully appointed to serve as acting USCIS Director and invalidated certain actions taken by him; the government dropped its appeal of this case in August 2020. On August 14, 2020, the Government Accountability Office released a finding that McAleenan, Wolf, and Cuccinelli had been appointed improperly to their Acting Secretary and Deputy Secretary positions; the DHS rejected this finding.

On November 14, 2020, the District Court for the Eastern District of New York ruled that Wolf was not lawfully serving as Acting Secretary of Homeland Security and overturned all of his orders as lacking "legal authority". Wolf resigned his post on January 11, 2021, after a number of similar court rulings.

From 2020 to 2021, similar concerns were raised about Christopher C. Miller served as acting United States secretary of defense.

== Background ==
The Federal Vacancies Reform Act of 1998 (FVRA) specified procedures for filling vacant offices, allowing the President to direct a person serving in a different Senate-confirmed position to serve as acting officer. The Homeland Security Act of 2002 (HSA) established the Department of Homeland Security and the position of the Secretary of Homeland Security. The line of succession to the Secretary was specified through a series of executive orders, the most recent of which was Executive Order 13753 of December 9, 2016, which specified the line of succession when the Secretary had "died, resigned, or otherwise become unable to perform the functions and duties of the office of Secretary".

The National Defense Authorization Act for Fiscal Year 2017, signed into law on December 23, 2016, amended the HSA to create new procedures for specifying the line of succession for the Secretary as an exception to the procedures in the FVRA. Specifically, it specified that the Under Secretary of Homeland Security for Management must be third in line to the Secretary position, and second in line to the Deputy Secretary position. It also allowed the Secretary rather than the President to specify the further lines of succession, and did not specify a time limit to the eligibility of acting officials as the FVRA had done.

The Secretary specified succession through DHS Delegation 00106, which went through a number of revisions. By February 2019, it stated that Executive Order 13753 still held in the case of death, resignation, or inability; and provided an "Annex A" specifying the succession if the Secretary became "unavailable to act during a disaster or catastrophic emergency", although the order of succession was the same in both cases.

== Disputed appointments ==
=== McAleenan and Wolf as Acting Secretary ===
Kirstjen Nielsen served as the Senate-confirmed Secretary of Homeland Security from December 5, 2017, until April 10, 2019. On April 9, 2019, Nielsen had issued a new revision of Delegation 00106 that updated Annex A, but left Executive Order 13753 in place in the case of death, resignation, or inability. At the time, DHS referred to Annex A, which had Customs and Border Protection Commissioner Kevin McAleenan as next in line, rather than Executive Order 13753, which had Cybersecurity and Infrastructure Security Agency Director Chris Krebs as next in line. While Nielsen demonstrably intended to place McAleenan next in line, and a memorandum from the DHS General Counsel to Nielsen contained ambiguous language, the actual issued text of the amended Delegation 00106 unambiguously placed Krebs next in line. McAleenan served as Acting Secretary, at least in a de facto capacity, from April 11 until November 13, 2019.

On November 8, 2019, McAleenan issued another revision of Delegation 00106, which specified Annex A as the line of succession for all situations, and placed the Under Secretary for Strategy, Policy, and Plans fourth in line for the Secretary position. Upon McAleenan's resignation, Chad Wolf began serving de facto as Acting Secretary on November 13, 2019.

=== Cuccinelli as Acting USCIS Director and Deputy Secretary ===
Ken Cuccinelli was appointed to serve in the newly created position of Principal Deputy Director of the United States Citizenship and Immigration Services (USCIS) in June 2019. This was intended to make him the "first assistant" to the Director position, making him eligible to immediately become its acting director.

On November 13, 2019, the day he assumed office, Wolf amended Annex B of Delegation 00106 specifying the order of succession for Deputy Secretary, placing the Principal Deputy Director of Citizenship and Immigration Services second in line after the Under Secretary for Management, thus specifying Cuccinelli as Senior Official Performing the Duties of the Deputy Secretary.

== Controversy ==
=== USCIS appointment ===
In a June 18, 2019 letter to the Acting Secretary of Homeland Security, House committee chairs Jerry Nadler, Elijah Cummings, and Bennie Thompson alleged that Cuccinelli's brief appointment as Principal Deputy Director had been retroactively applied, possibly in violation of the FVRA. The USCIS employees union also challenged the legality of Cuccinelli's appointment.

In September 2019, a lawsuit was filed challenging his asylum directives, partially on the basis that his appointment was invalid. On March 1, 2020, Judge Randolph D. Moss of the United States District Court for the District of Columbia ruled that Cuccinelli was not lawfully appointed to serve as acting director, on the basis that the novel nature of the Principal Deputy Director position meant that he had never served as the "first assistant" to anyone. He therefore lacked authority to issue two of the directives challenged in the lawsuit. Because the case was not filed as a class action, Moss was "unconvinced" that his relief should be extended to other asylum seekers not part of the original suit.

On August 12, 2020, the government dropped its appeal in the case.

=== Secretary and Deputy Secretary appointments ===
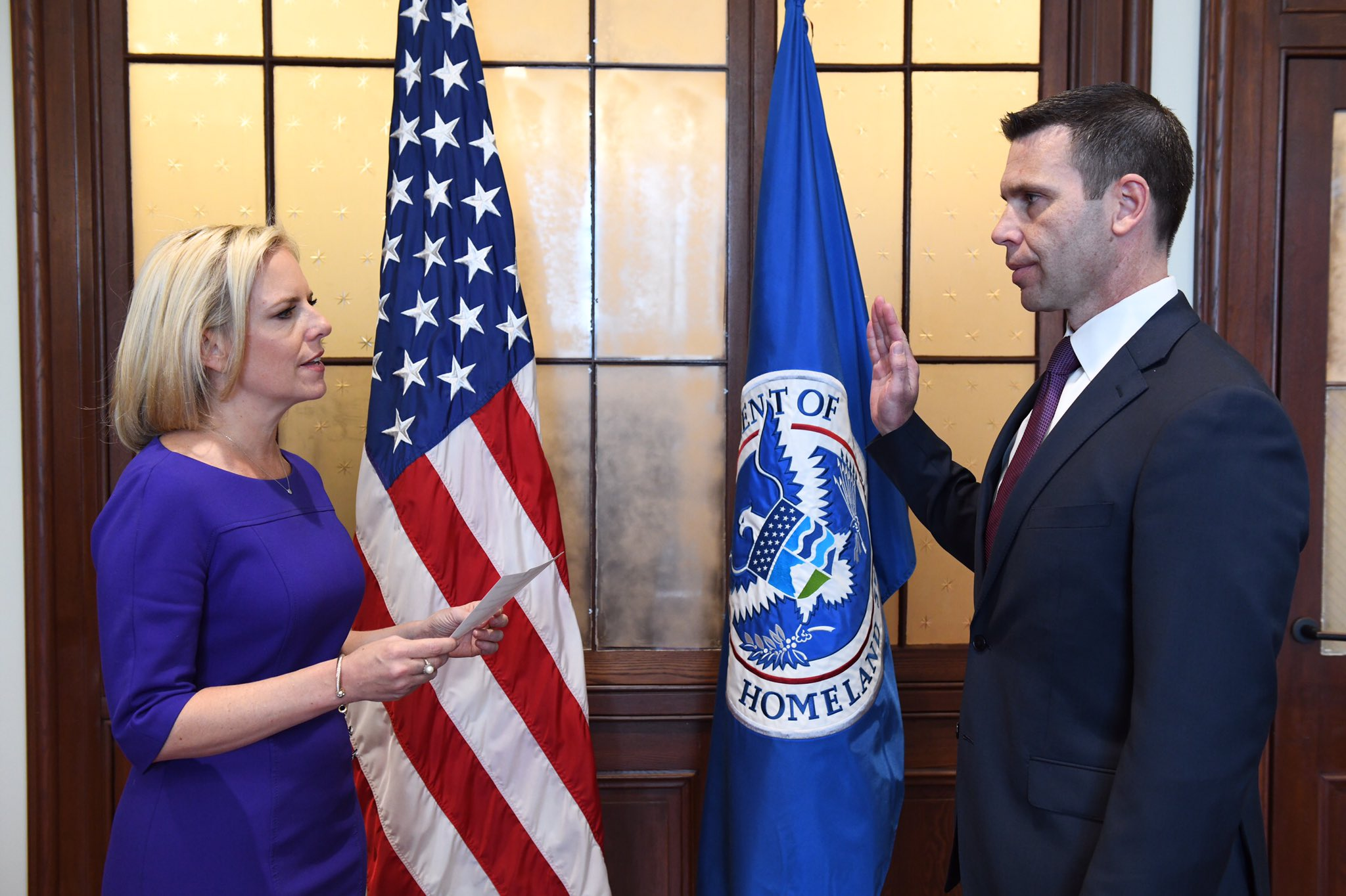
Kevin McAleenan being sworn in as DHS Acting Secretary by Kirstjen Nielsen in April 2019. DHS used this photograph to argue that Nielsen had intended to and had legally placed McAleenan next in line to become Acting Secretary, validating the later appointments of Wolf and Cuccinelli.

==== Government Accountability Office finding ====
On November 15, 2019, House Democrats Bennie Thompson and Carolyn Maloney requested that Comptroller General of the United States Gene Dodaro review the legality of Wolf's appointment on the basis that former Acting Secretary McAleenan did not have authority to change the department's line of succession, asserting that former Secretary Nielsen had not properly placed McAleenan first in the line of succession before resigning and that McAleenan's change came after the 210-day limit to his authority had expired.

On August 14, 2020, the Government Accountability Office released a finding that McAleenan, Wolf, and Cuccinelli had been appointed improperly, noting that:

Upon Secretary Kirstjen Nielsen's resignation on April 10, 2019, the official who assumed the title of Acting Secretary had not been designated in the order of succession to serve upon the Secretary's resignation. Because the incorrect official assumed the title of Acting Secretary at that time, subsequent amendments to the order of succession made by that official were invalid and officials who assumed their positions under such amendments, including Chad Wolf and Kenneth Cuccinelli, were named by reference to an invalid order of succession.

Dodaro referred the matter to Department of Homeland Security Inspector General Joseph V. Cuffari to review the questions of who should be serving in these positions, the legality of other actions taken by McAleenan, Wolf, and Cuccinelli. Under the line of succession found valid by GAO, the Acting Secretary as of August 2020 would be Federal Emergency Management Agency Administrator Pete Gaynor. Although GAO findings are not legally binding, it was expected to affect several pending court cases, including Wolf v. Vidal, where plaintiffs had argued that rules issued by McAleenan, Wolf, and Cuccinelli were void because they had been improperly appointed.

On August 17, the Department of Homeland Security's Acting General Counsel issued a statement rejecting the GAO's finding, saying that Nielsen had in fact legally appointed McAleenan as Acting Secretary. To support this they stated the fact that she had personally sworn him in, and announced in a public email that he was the incoming Acting Secretary, as evidence of her intention. They also pointed to a preliminary memorandum from the DHS General Counsel to Nielsen that, unlike the text of the actual DHS Delegation, included ambiguous language. They also criticized the timing of the finding, noting that GAO had taken over eight months to issue the finding, and released in just 80 days prior to the 2020 United States elections, and asserted that the validity of the appointment was outside the GAO's jurisdiction because it was made under the HSA and not the FVRA.

On August 21, GAO declined to retract or amend their findings, saying that DHS had not provided any evidence of material errors of fact or law in the finding, and that all their points had already been considered in the finding.

==== Subsequent events and legal challenges ====
On August 25, 2020, President Trump announced that he would nominate Wolf to be confirmed by the Senate as the permanent Secretary of Homeland Security. The nomination was formally submitted to the Senate on September 10. The same day, FEMA Administrator Pete Gaynor, who was highest official in the proper Acting Secretary succession order, issued a memo designating the same order of succession that was intended to be established by McAleenan, in order to make Wolf the proper Acting Secretary. Wolf then issued a memo reaffirming his previous actions as Acting Secretary. However, on November 13, DHS admitted in a court ruling that Gaynor's memo had apparently been issued about an hour before the Senate nomination had been made, which may affect its legality.

On September 11, federal judge Paula Xinis ruled that Wolf was likely unlawfully serving as acting secretary of the Department of Homeland Security. On that basis, the court issued an order barring the enforcement of rules Wolf had created. Likewise, on November 14, Judge Nicholas Garaufis of the U.S. District Court for the Eastern District of New York ruled that Wolf was not lawfully serving as Acting Secretary of Homeland Security due to the improper appointments of McAleenan and Wolf. In addition to finding the 2019 McAleenan memo ineffective, Garaufis ruled that the 2020 Gaynor memo was also ineffective because DHS had not fulfilled legal formalities about notifying Congress for Gaynor to serve as acting secretary. Nevertheless, Gaynor issued a duplicate memo on November 17, 2020.

Other courts soon followed suit. On January 8, 2021, Judge James Donato of the U.S. District Court for the Northern District of California became the fifth judge to rule that Wolf was not lawfully acting as the Acting Secretary of Homeland Security.

Meanwhile, Wolf's nomination to be the permanent Secretary of Homeland Security expired on January 3, 2021 at the end of the 116th United States Congress and was returned to the President under Senate Rule XXXI. President Trump then resubmitted Wolf's nomination later that day before withdrawing it on January 6, reportedly because of private statements Wolf had made during the January 6 United States Capitol attack. As a result of this withdrawal, Wolf was likely barred from continuing to serve as acting secretary by section 749 of the Omnibus Appropriations Act, 2009, which prohibits the use of any appropriations to pay an acting official if they have twice been nominated to be the permanent official and those nominations were withdrawn or returned to the President, and the Antideficiency Act, which prohibits government officials from serving without pay.

Wolf resigned his post on January 11, saying his action was "warranted by recent events, including the ongoing and meritless court rulings regarding the validity of my authority as acting secretary."
