= United States Secretary of Homeland Security =

Head of the Department of Homeland Security

- Seal of the Department of Homeland Security

- Flag of the secretary

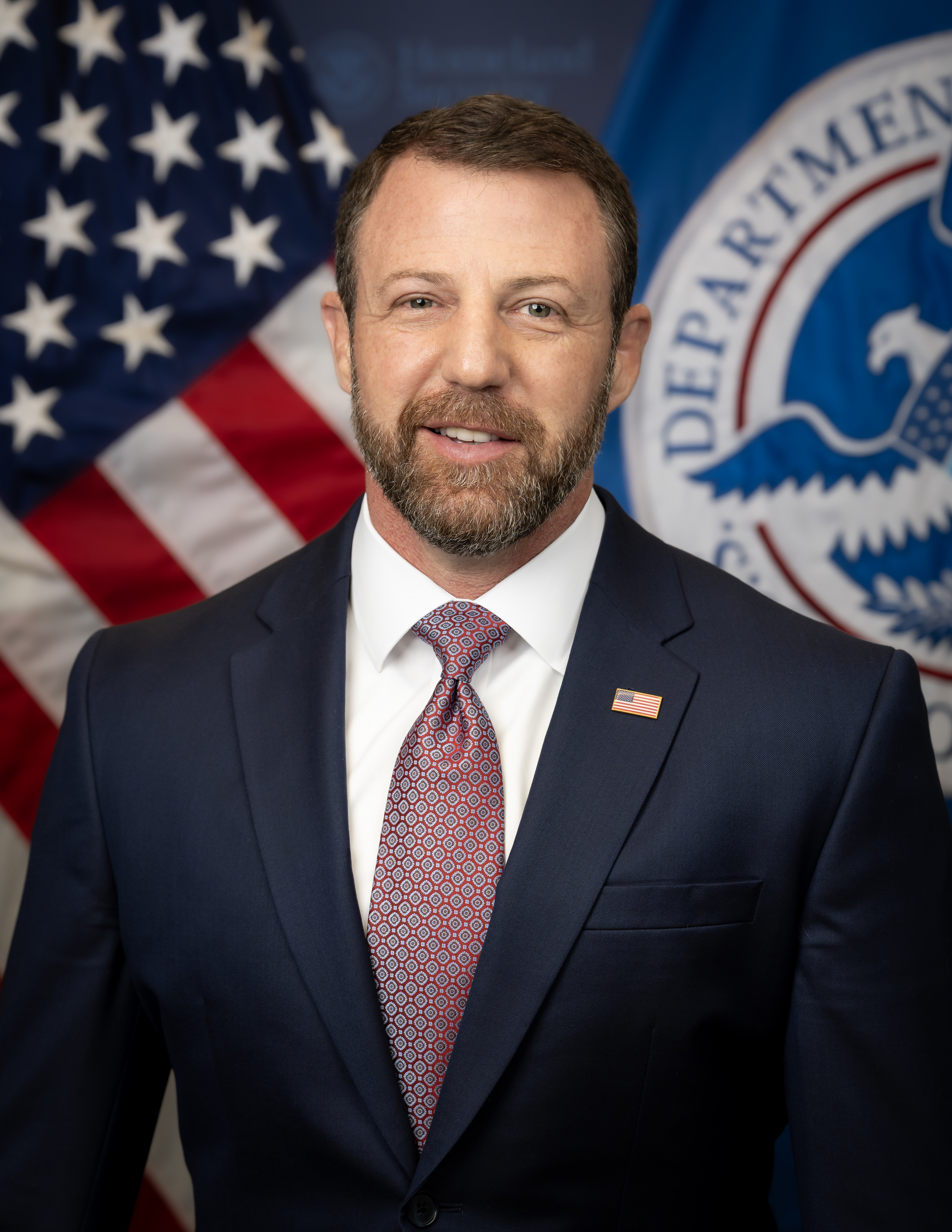
- Incumbent; Markwayne Mullin since March 24, 2026
- Department of Homeland Security
- Style: Mister/Madam Secretary (informal); The Honorable (formal)
- Member of: Cabinet; Homeland Security Council; National Security Council
- Reports to: President of the United States
- Seat: St. Elizabeths West Campus, Washington, D.C.
- Appointer: President; with advice and consent of the Senate
- Term length: No fixed term
- Constituting instrument: 6 U.S.C. § 112
- Formation: January 24, 2003 (23 years ago)
- First holder: Tom Ridge
- Succession: Eighteenth
- Deputy: Deputy Secretary
- Salary: Executive Schedule, Level I
- Website: dhs.gov

The United States secretary of homeland security is the head of the United States Department of Homeland Security, the federal department tasked with border control, counterterrorism and other aspects of public safety in the United States. The secretary is a member of the Cabinet of the United States. The position was created by the Homeland Security Act following the terrorist attacks of September 11, 2001.

The new department consisted primarily of components transferred from other Cabinet departments because of their role in homeland security, such as the Coast Guard, the Federal Protective Service, U.S. Customs and Border Protection (which includes the United States Border Patrol), U.S. Immigration and Customs Enforcement (which includes Homeland Security Investigations), the United States Secret Service, the Transportation Security Administration and the Federal Emergency Management Agency.

The current homeland security secretary is Markwayne Mullin, who was sworn in on March 24, 2026.

== List of secretaries of homeland security ==
Prior to the establishment of the U.S. Department of Homeland Security, there existed an assistant to the president for the Office of Homeland Security, which was created following the September 11 attacks in 2001.

No.	Portrait	Name	State of residence	Senate vote	Term of office			President
No.	Portrait	Name	State of residence	Senate vote	Took office	Left office	Duration	President
1	Tom Ridge	Tom Ridge (born 1945)	Pennsylvania	94–0	January 24, 2003	February 1, 2005	2 years, 8 days	George W. Bush (2001–2009)
–	James Loy	James Loy^{[a]} (born 1942); Acting	Pennsylvania	–	February 1, 2005	February 15, 2005	14 days	George W. Bush (2001–2009)
2	Michael Chertoff	Michael Chertoff (born 1953)	New Jersey	98–0	February 15, 2005	January 21, 2009	3 years, 341 days	George W. Bush (2001–2009)
3	Janet Napolitano	Janet Napolitano (born 1957)	Arizona	Voice vote	January 21, 2009	September 6, 2013	4 years, 228 days	Barack Obama (2009–2017)
–	Rand Beers	Rand Beers^{[b]} (born 1942); Acting	Maryland	–	September 6, 2013	December 23, 2013	108 days	Barack Obama (2009–2017)
4	Jeh Johnson	Jeh Johnson (born 1957)	New York	78–16	December 23, 2013	January 20, 2017	3 years, 28 days	Barack Obama (2009–2017)
5	John F. Kelly	John F. Kelly (born 1950)	Massachusetts	88–11	January 20, 2017	July 31, 2017	192 days	Donald Trump (2017–2021)
–	Elaine Duke	Elaine Duke^{[c]} (born 1958); Acting	Ohio	–	July 31, 2017	December 6, 2017	128 days	Donald Trump (2017–2021)
6	Kirstjen Nielsen	Kirstjen Nielsen (born 1972)	Florida	62–37	December 6, 2017	April 10, 2019	1 year, 125 days	Donald Trump (2017–2021)
–	Kevin McAleenan	Kevin McAleenan^{[d]} (born 1971); Acting; unlawful tenure	California	–	April 10, 2019	November 13, 2019	217 days	Donald Trump (2017–2021)
–	Chad Wolf	Chad Wolf^{[e]} (born 1976); Acting; unlawful tenure	Texas	–	November 13, 2019	January 11, 2021	1 year, 59 days	Donald Trump (2017–2021)
–	Pete Gaynor	Pete Gaynor^{[f]} (born 1968); Acting	Rhode Island	–	January 11, 2021	January 20, 2021	9 days	Donald Trump (2017–2021)
–	David Pekoske	David Pekoske^{[g]} (born 1955); Acting	Connecticut	–	January 20, 2021	February 2, 2021	13 days	Joe Biden (2021–2025)
7	Alejandro Mayorkas	Alejandro Mayorkas (born 1959)	California	56–43	February 2, 2021	January 20, 2025	3 years, 353 days	Joe Biden (2021–2025)
–		Benjamine Huffman^{[h]} Acting	Texas	–	January 20, 2025	January 25, 2025	5 days	Donald Trump (2025–present)
8		Kristi Noem (born 1971)	South Dakota	59–34	January 25, 2025	March 24, 2026	1 year, 58 days	Donald Trump (2025–present)
9		Markwayne Mullin (born 1977)	Oklahoma	54–45	March 24, 2026	Incumbent	232 days	Donald Trump (2025–present)

=== Table notes ===
Republican (7) Democratic (4) Independent (5)

Denotes acting homeland security secretary

a. James Loy served as acting secretary in his capacity as Deputy Secretary of Homeland Security.

b. Rand Beers served as acting secretary in his capacity as confirmed Undersecretary of Homeland Security for National Protection and Programs and Acting Deputy Secretary of Homeland Security; Beers was the highest ranking Senate-approved presidential appointee at the Department of Homeland Security.

c. Elaine Duke served as acting secretary in her capacity as Deputy Secretary of Homeland Security.

d. Kevin McAleenan served as acting secretary in his capacity as Commissioner of Customs and Border Protection. His tenure was ruled unlawful.

e. Chad Wolf served as acting secretary in his capacity as Under Secretary of Homeland Security for Strategy, Policy, and Plans. His tenure was ruled unlawful.

f. Peter Gaynor served as acting secretary in his capacity as Federal Emergency Management Agency Administrator.

g. David Pekoske served as acting secretary in his capacity as Administrator of the Transportation Security Administration

h. Benjamine Huffman served as acting secretary in his capacity as Director of the Federal Law Enforcement Training Centers.

== Order of succession ==
While appointment of acting officials is generally governed by the Federal Vacancies Reform Act of 1998 (FVRA), the Homeland Security Act of 2002 creates exceptions to FVRA, mandating that the under secretary of homeland security for management is third in the line of succession for Secretary of Homeland Security, and establishes an alternate process by which the secretary can directly establish a line of succession outside the provisions of the FVRA.

As of November 8, 2019, the order of succession is as follows. However, the legality of this update was challenged.

1. Deputy Secretary of Homeland Security
2. Under Secretary for Management
3. Commissioner of the U.S. Customs and Border Protection
4. Under Secretary for Strategy, Policy, and Plans
5. Administrator and Assistant Secretary of the Transportation Security Administration
6. Administrator of the Federal Emergency Management Agency

Formerly, an update on April 10, 2019, to the DHS Orders of Succession, made pursuant to the Homeland Security Act of 2002, provided a different order in the case of unavailability to act during a disaster or catastrophic emergency:

1. Deputy Secretary of Homeland Security
2. Under Secretary for Management
3. Commissioner of U.S. Customs and Border Protection
4. Administrator of the Federal Emergency Management Agency
5. Director of the Cybersecurity and Infrastructure Security Agency
6. Under Secretary for Science and Technology
7. Under Secretary for Intelligence and Analysis
8. Administrator of the Transportation Security Administration
9. Director of U.S. Immigration and Customs Enforcement
10. Director of U.S. Citizenship and Immigration Services
11. Under Secretary for Strategy, Policy, and Plans
12. General Counsel
13. Deputy Under Secretary for Management
14. Deputy Commissioner of U.S. Customs and Border Protection
15. Deputy Administrator of the Transportation Security Administration
16. Deputy Director of U.S. Immigration and Customs Enforcement
17. Deputy Director of U.S. Citizenship and Immigration Services
18. Director of the Federal Law Enforcement Training Centers

As a result of Executive Order 13753 in 2016, the order of succession for the secretary of homeland security was as follows:

1. Deputy Secretary of Homeland Security
2. Under Secretary of Homeland Security for Management
3. Administrator of the Federal Emergency Management Agency
4. Under Secretary of Homeland Security for National Protection and Programs
5. Under Secretary of Homeland Security for Science and Technology
6. Under Secretary for Intelligence and Analysis
7. Commissioner of U.S. Customs and Border Protection
8. Administrator of the Transportation Security Administration
9. Director of U.S. Immigration and Customs Enforcement
10. Director of U.S. Citizenship and Immigration Services
11. Assistant Secretary for Policy
12. General Counsel of the Department of Homeland Security
13. Deputy Under Secretary for Management
14. Deputy Commissioner of U.S. Customs and Border Protection
15. Deputy Administrator of the Transportation Security Administration
16. Deputy Director of U.S. Immigration and Customs Enforcement
17. Deputy Director of U.S. Citizenship and Immigration Services
18. Director of the Federal Law Enforcement Training Center

== Office of the Secretary of Homeland Security ==
The Office of the Secretary (OS) oversees the execution of the duties of the Department of Homeland Security. Certain elements also aid the secretary of homeland security and senior officials of the Department of Homeland Security, as well as private sector and government partners in their duties.

=== Composition ===
The Office of the Secretary contains several offices and other elements of the DHS. Most of the heads of these elements report directly to the secretary or deputy secretary, but the military advisor and executive secretary report to the DHS chief of staff, a position that is currently vacant since January 2025.

While DHS secretary Kristi Noem was participating in an immigration raid on April 8, 2025, she was accompanied by former Trump campaign manager and senior adviser Corey Lewandowski, who introduced himself to the federal agents as “chief of staff.” DHS later clarified that he is an adviser to DHS and a special government employee.

Components of the Office of the Secretary of Homeland Security
Component	Mission	Executives	Subordinate components
Office for Civil Rights and Civil Liberties (CRCL)	Supports the Department's mission to secure the nation while preserving individual liberty, fairness, and equality under the law.; Builds in civil rights and civil liberties practices into all of the Department’s activities.	Officer for Civil Rights and Civil Liberties: Shoba Sivaprasad Wadhia; Deputy Officer for Programs & Compliance: Peter Mina; Deputy Officer for EEO and Diversity: Veronica Venture	Programs and Compliance Division; Equal Employment Opportunity and Diversity Division; Office for Accessible Systems and Technology (jointly run with DHS Office of the Chief Information Officer)
Office of the Citizenship and Immigration Services Ombudsman (CISOMB)	Serves as a liaison between the public and U.S. Citizenship and Immigration Services.; Helps individuals and employers resolve issues they are having with USCIS.; Holds engagements to hear from the public about their experiences with USCIS.; Identifies issues in the immigration system and make recommendations to USCIS on how to address these problems.	CIS Ombudsman: Nathan Stiefel (acting); Deputy Ombudsman: Nathan Stiefel	Policy Division; Public Engagement Division; Casework Division; Operations Division; Strategy Division
Climate Change Action Group	Drives urgent action to address the climate crisis.; Analyzes, on an ongoing basis, the impacts of climate change on DHS missions, assets, and personnel.; Adapts DHS operations, assets, and missions to account for the climate crisis via risk- based strategies.; Coordinates DHS-wide sustainability operations to mitigate additional harm.; Recommends specific, concrete steps to reduce greenhouse gas emissions.; Recommends specific, concrete steps to promote resilience and adaptation to reduce the multiple risks posed by the climate crisis.; Recommends organizational and resource realignments as necessary to support the Department’s activities to address the climate crisis.	Co-Chairs: Cass Sunstein & Robert P. Silvers	
Office of the Executive Secretary (ESEC)	Provides all manner of direct support to the Secretary of Homeland Security and Deputy Secretary of Homeland Security, as well as related support to leadership and management across the DHS.; Accurate and timely dissemination of information and written communications.	Executive Secretary: Kimberly O'Connor	
Office of the Immigration Detention Ombudsman (OIDO)	Assists individuals with complaints about the potential violation of immigration detention standards or other misconduct by DHS (or contract) personnel.; Provides oversight of immigration detention facilities.	ID Ombudsman: David Gersten (acting); ID Deputy Ombudsman: N/A	Case Management Division; Detention Oversight Division; Policy and Standards Division; External Relations Division; Operations and Resource Management Division; Program Integration Division
Family Reunification Task Force	Committed to the safe reunification of families that were unjustly separated at the U.S.-Mexico border.	Chair: Alejandro Mayorkas; Executive Director: Michelle Brané	Includes the secretaries of Homeland Security, Health and Human Services, and State, as well as the Attorney General. It also includes several other officials from the DHS, DOJ, HHS, and State Department.
Office of the General Counsel (OGC)	Provides complete, accurate, and timely legal advice on possible courses of action for the DHS.; Ensures that homeland security policies are implemented lawfully, quickly, and efficiently.; Protects the rights and liberties of any Americans who come in contact with the Department of Homeland Security.; Facilitates quick responses to congressional requests for information.; Represents the department in venues across the country, including in U.S. immigration courts.; The OGC accomplishes these tasks with over 3,000 attorneys.	General Counsel: Jonathan Meyer; Deputy General Counsel: Joseph B. Maher; CBP Chief Counsel: Frederick B. Smith; CISA Chief Counsel: Spencer Fisher; USCIS Chief Counsel: A. Ashley Tabaddor; USCG Judge Advocate General: Melissa Bert; FEMA Chief Counsel: Adrian Sevier; FLETC Chief Counsel: Trisha Besselman (acting); ICE Principal Legal Advisor: Kerry Doyle; USSS Chief Counsel: Thomas F. Huse; TSA Chief Counsel: Francine Kerner	Ethics & Compliance Law Division; General Law Division; Immigration Law Division; Intelligence Law Division; Legal Counsel Division; Operations and Enforcement Law Division; Regulatory Affairs Law Division; Technology Programs Law Division
Joint Requirements Council (JRC)	Validates capability gaps.; Associated with operational requirements and proposed solution approaches to mitigate those gaps through the Joint Requirements Integration and Management System (JRIMS).; Leverages opportunities for commonality to enhance operational effectiveness directly and better inform the DHS’ main investment pillars.	Executive Director: Joseph D. Wawro	The JRC consists of the Principals Council – the operational Components (Cybersecurity and Infrastructure Security Agency, U.S. Customs and Border Protection, Federal Emergency Management Agency, U.S. Immigration and Customs Enforcement, U.S. Secret Service, Transportation Security Administration, U.S. Coast Guard, and U.S. Citizenship and Immigration Services), I&A, Management, CIO, Policy, and S&T.
Office of Legislative Affairs (OLA)	Serves as primary liaison to members of Congress and their staffs, the White House and Executive Branch, and to other federal agencies and governmental entities that have roles in assuring national security	Assistant Secretary for Legislative Affairs: Zephranie Buetow; Deputy Assistant Secretary (Senate): Bryn McDonough; Deputy Assistant Secretary (House of Representatives): Alexandra Carnes	Each area of responsibility is managed by a director. There's a DAS for the U.S. Senate, a DAS for the U.S. House of Representatives, and a Chief of Staff.: Headquarters; Operational Component Coordination; Intelligence, Cyber, and Operations; Oversight and Investigations; Executive Secretary and Mission Support
Office of the Military Advisor	Provides counsel and support to the Secretary and Deputy Secretary in affairs relating to policy, procedures, preparedness activities, and operations between DHS and the U.S. Department of Defense.	Military Advisor to the Secretary: Rear Admiral Michael Platt	
Office of Partnership and Engagement (OPE)	Coordinates the Department of Homeland Security’s outreach efforts with key stakeholders nationwide.; Ensures a unified approach to external engagement amongst the DHS.	Assistant Secretary for Partnership and Engagement: Brenda F. Abdelall; Principal Deputy Assistant Secretary: Rebecca Sternhell; Deputy Assistant Secretary, Office of Intergovernmental Affairs: › miriam-enriquez-26176910b Miriam Enriquez; Deputy Assistant Secretary, Private Sector Office: Jamie Lawrence	Office of Intergovernmental Affairs; State and Local Affairs; Tribal Government Affairs; Private Sector Office; Office of Academic Engagement; Faith-Based Security Advisory Council; Committee Management Office; Homeland Security Advisory Council; Office of Social Impact and Campaigns; Director, Non-Governmental Organizations
Privacy Office	Protects individuals by embedding and enforcing privacy protections and transparency in all DHS activities.	Chief Privacy Officer: Mason C. Clutter (concurrently serves as the DHS Chief Freedom of Information Officer)	Senior Policy Advisor and Executive Director, Strategy and Integration; Deputy Chief FOIA Officer; Senior Director, FOIA Operations and Management; Director of Disclosure; Senior Director, Litigation, Appeals, and Policy; Director, Policy, Oversight, Compliance; Deputy Chief Privacy Officer; Senior Director, Privacy Compliance; Director, Privacy Compliance; Senior Director, Privacy Policy and Oversight; Director, Privacy Policy; Director, Privacy Incidents; Director, Privacy Oversight; Chief of Staff; Director, Business Operations; Director, Communications & Training
Office of Public Affairs (OPA)	Coordinates the public affairs activities of all of the components and offices of the DHS.; Serves as the federal government’s lead public information office during a national emergency or disaster.	Assistant Secretary for Public Affairs: Daniel Watson; Principal Deputy Assistant Secretary for Communications: Luis Miranda; Deputy Assistant Secretary for Media Relations: Sarah Schakow; Deputy Assistant Secretary for Strategic Communications: Jeff Solnet	DHS Press Office; Incident and Strategic Communications; Multimedia; Speechwriting; Web Communications; Internal Communications
Office of Strategy, Policy, and Plans (OSP&P)	Serves as a central resource to the Secretary and other department leaders for strategic planning and analysis, and facilitation of decision-making on the full breadth of issues that may arise across the dynamic homeland security enterprise	Under Secretary for Strategy, Policy, and Plans: Robert Silvers; Deputy Under Secretary: Kelli Ann Burriesci	Chief of Staff; Assistant Secretary for Border and Immigration Policy; Deputy Assistant Secretary, Border and Immigration; Deputy Assistant Secretary, Immigration Statistics; Assistant Secretary for Counterterrorism and Threat Prevention; Principal Deputy Assistant Secretary, Counterterrorism and Threat Prevention; Deputy Assistant Secretary, Screening and Vetting; Deputy Assistant Secretary, Law Enforcement; Deputy Assistant Secretary, Countering Transnational Organized Crime; Deputy Assistant Secretary, Counterterrorism and Threat Prevention; Assistant Secretary for International Affairs; Principal Deputy Assistant Secretary, International Affairs; Deputy Assistant Secretary, Western Hemisphere; Assistant Secretary for Trade and Economic Security; Deputy Assistant Secretary, Trade Policy; Deputy Assistant Secretary, Economic Security; Assistant Secretary for Cyber, Infrastructure, Risk, and Resilience; Deputy Assistant Secretary, Cyber Policy; Deputy Assistant Secretary, Infrastructure, Risk, and Resilience; Deputy Assistant Secretary for Strategic Integration and Policy Planning
Office for State and Local Law Enforcement (OSLLE)	Provides DHS with primary coordination, liaison, and advocacy for state, local, tribal, territorial, and campus (SLTTC) law enforcement.	Assistant Secretary for State and Local Law Enforcement: Heather Fong; Deputy Assistant Secretary: N/A	

== See also ==
- 2019–2021 Department of Homeland Security appointment disputes
- Interior minister
- List of current interior ministers

U.S. order of precedence (ceremonial)
Preceded by Doug Collins as Secretary of Veterans Affairs	Order of precedence of the United States as Secretary of Homeland Security	Succeeded by Stephen Miller as White House Chief of Staff
U.S. presidential line of succession
Preceded by Secretary of Veterans Affairs; Doug Collins	18th in line	Last
