= Alan D. Cohn =

American government official

Assistant Secretary for Strategy, Plans, Analysis and Risk, U.S. Department of Homeland Security
- In office 2012–2015
- Succeeded by: Brodi Kotila

Personal details
- Education: Columbia University (BA); Georgetown University Law Center (JD)
- Occupation: lawyer, public servant

Alan D. Cohn is an American lawyer and former government official who served as Assistant Secretary for Strategy, Planning, Analysis & Risk in the United States Department of Homeland Security Office of Policy from 2012 to 2015.

== Biography ==
Cohn received his A.B. in history and political science from Columbia University in 1993 and a J.D. degree from Georgetown University Law Center in 1997.

From 1990 to 1994, he was an emergency medical technician in New York City. As a student at Columbia, he was a volunteer for Columbia Area Volunteer Ambulance (CAVA, now CUEMS), a student-operated volunteer ambulance corps that provides pre-hospital emergency medical care to residents in Columbia-owned buildings on its Morningside Heights campus. Cohn was also a per-diem EMT with the New York Hospital-Cornell Medical Center (now NewYork-Presbyterian Hospital, one of the NYC 911 system voluntary ambulance providers) from 1991-1994, and responded to the 1993 World Trade Center bombing in that capacity. Cohn was a FEMA Disaster Assistance Employee from 1995 to 2006, and a Planning Officer on the Fairfax County Urban Search & Rescue Task Force from 1998 to 2006.

From 1997 to 1999, he worked at Littler Mendelson as an associate. He was an associate and of counsel at Akin Gump Strauss Hauer & Feld from 2000 to 2006.

Cohn joined the United States Department of Homeland Security as the Director of Emergency Preparedness and Response Policy in the Department of Homeland Security's Office of Policy Development, serving in that role from 2006 to 2008. In 2007, he joined the Senior Executive Service.

From 2008 to 2012, he was Deputy Assistant Secretary for Policy (Strategic Plans). From 2012 to 2015, he served as Assistant Secretary for Strategy, Planning, Analysis & Risk, where his work was responsible for strategy development, assessment, and evaluation, strategic environment assessment, risk modeling, assessment, and analysis, capability and vulnerability assessment, and economic and statistical analysis.

As Assistant Secretary, Cohn established the cyber policy office within the DHS Office of Policy and designed department policy on cybersecurity information sharing, cybercrime and cyber-related sanctions, and cyber incident management. He also represented the DHS on the Committee on Foreign Investments in the United States, designed and led the first two Quadrennial Homeland Security Reviews. He also helped implement DHS Secretary Jeh Johnson’s Unity of Effort Initiative to reform DHS governance and management.

Cohn authored the legal casebook, "Domestic Preparedness: Law, Policy, and National Security" (Carolina Academic Press 2012), as an adjunct professor at Georgetown University Law Center.

In 2015, Cohn joined Steptoe LLP, becoming partner and co-chair of the firm's blockchain and cryptocurrency practice.
