= Robert T. Law =

American lawyer and politician

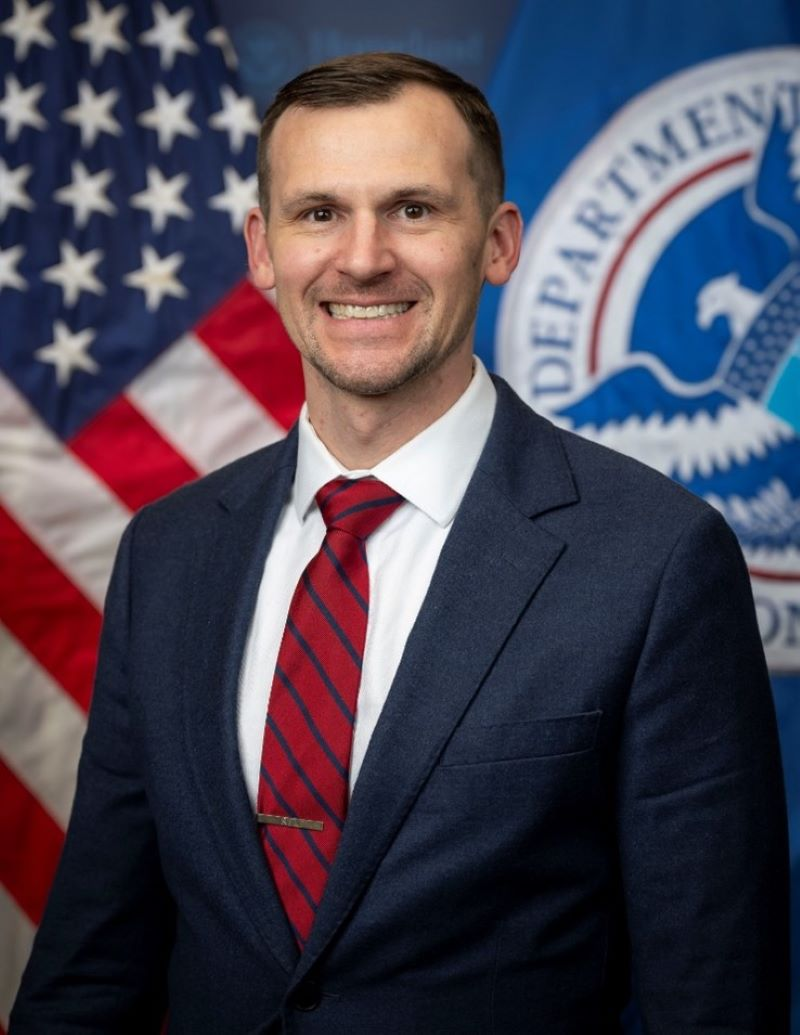

Under Secretary of Homeland Security for Strategy, Policy, and Plans
- Incumbent
- Assumed office September 10, 2025
- President: Donald Trump
- Preceded by: Robert P. Silvers

Personal details
- Education: University of Virginia (BA); Catholic University of America (JD)

Robert T. Law is an American lawyer who currently serves as Under Secretary of Homeland Security for Strategy, Policy, and Plans at the U.S. Department of Homeland Security.

== Early life and education ==
Law attended the University of Virginia and received his Juris Doctor degree from the Catholic University of America.

== Career ==
Law worked for anti-immigrant think tanks, including the Center for Immigration Studies and the Federation for American Immigration Reform (FAIR).

In President Donald Trump's first term, Law served in the U.S. Citizenship and Immigration Services.

Law worked for the America First Policy Institute as the director of its Center for Homeland Security and Immigration.

Law served as the lead advisor to then-Governor Kristi Noem to prepare for her Senate confirmation process.

In June 2025, the U.S. Senate Homeland Security and Government Affairs Committee held a hearing to examine Law's nomination. Law was confirmed by a 49–46 vote on September 9, 2025.
