= DHS Office of Strategy, Policy, and Plans =

United States government office

Under Secretary for Strategy, Policy, and Plans
- Seal of the Department of Homeland Security

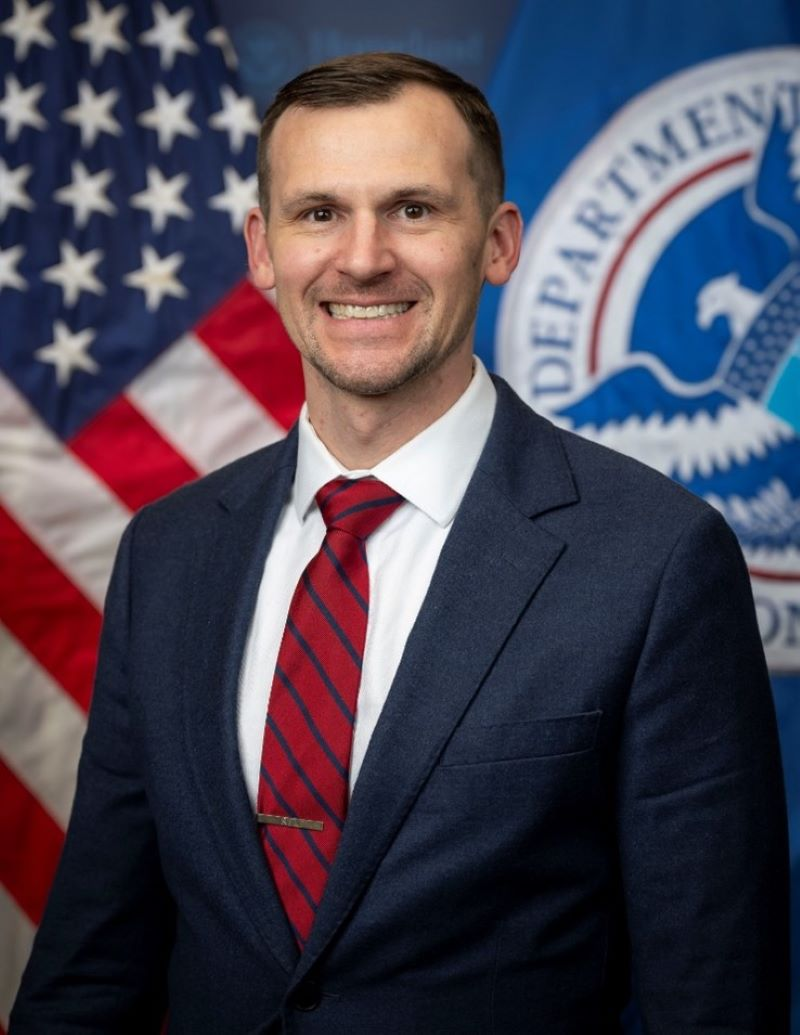
- Incumbent; Robert Law since September 10, 2025
- United States Department of Homeland Security
- Style: Mr Under Secretary
- Reports to: Secretary of Homeland Security; Deputy Secretary of Homeland Security
- Appointer: The president with Senate advice and consent
- Term length: No fixed term
- Constituting instrument: 6 U.S.C. § 113
- Formation: 2017
- First holder: Chad Wolf
- Succession: 5th in secretary succession
- Deputy: Deputy Under Secretary for Strategy, Policy, and Plans
- Salary: Executive Schedule, level III
- Website: www.dhs.gov/office-strategy-policy-plans

The Office of Strategy, Policy, and Plans is part of the United States Department of Homeland Security. It was created by the National Defense Authorization Act for Fiscal Year 2017, replacing the former Office of Policy, and creating a new Senate-confirmed under secretary of homeland security for strategy, policy, and plans position.

== Overview ==
Chad Wolf was confirmed by the Senate as the first Under Secretary on November 13, 2019.

== Reporting officials ==
Officials reporting to the under secretary (PLCY) include:

- Deputy Under Secretary for Strategy, Policy, and Plans
- Assistant Secretary for Border and Immigration Policy
  - Deputy Assistant Secretary for Border Policy
  - Deputy Assistant Secretary for Immigration Policy
  - Deputy Assistant Secretary for Immigration Statistics
- Assistant Secretary for Counterterrorism, Threat Prevention, and Law Enforcement Policy
  - Principal Deputy Assistant Secretary for Counterterrorism, Threat Prevention, and Law Enforcement Policy
  - Deputy Assistant Secretary for Screening and Vetting
  - Deputy Assistant Secretary for Law Enforcement
  - Deputy Assistant Secretary for Countering Transnational Organized Crime
  - Deputy Assistant Secretary for Emerging Threats
- Assistant Secretary for International Affairs
  - Deputy Assistant Secretary for International Affairs
  - Deputy Assistant Secretary for Western Hemisphere
- Assistant Secretary for Trade and Economic Security
  - Deputy Assistant Secretary for Trade Policy
  - Deputy Assistant Secretary for Economic Security
- Assistant Secretary for Cyber, Infrastructure, Risk, and Resilience
  - Deputy Assistant Secretary for Cyber Policy
- Deputy Assistant Secretary for Strategic Integration and Policy Planning

== List of under secretaries for strategy, policy, and plans ==
No.	Portrait	Under Secretary	Took office	Left office	Time in office	Secretary of Homeland Security	President	Ref(s)
-	James D. Nealon	James D. Nealon; Acting	10 July 2017	8 February 2018	213 days	Kirstjen Nielsen	Donald Trump	-
-	Chad Wolf	Chad Wolf; Acting	8 February 2018	13 November 2019	1 year, 278 days	Kirstjen Nielsen; Kevin McAleenan (acting)	Donald Trump	-
1	Chad Wolf	Chad Wolf	13 November 2019	20 January 2021	1 year, 68 days	Chad Wolf (acting)	Donald Trump	-
-	Kelli Ann Burriesci	Kelli Ann Burriesci; Acting	20 January 2021	10 August 2021	202 days	David Pekoske (acting); Alejandro Mayorkas	Joe Biden	-
2	Robert P. Silvers	Robert P. Silvers	10 August 2021	18 December 2024	3 years, 130 days	Alejandro Mayorkas	Joe Biden	-
-	Robert D. Paschall	Robert D. Paschall; Acting	18 December 2024	3 March 2025	75 days	Alejandro Mayorkas; Benjamine Huffman (acting); Kristi Noem	Joe Biden; Donald Trump	-
-	Christopher C. Pratt	Christopher C. Pratt; Acting	3 March 2025	10 September 2025	191 days	Kristi Noem	Donald Trump	-
3	Robert Law	Robert Law	10 September 2025	Incumbent	362 days	Kristi Noem; Markwayne Mullin	Donald Trump	-
