= Chad Wolf =

American civil servant (born 1976)

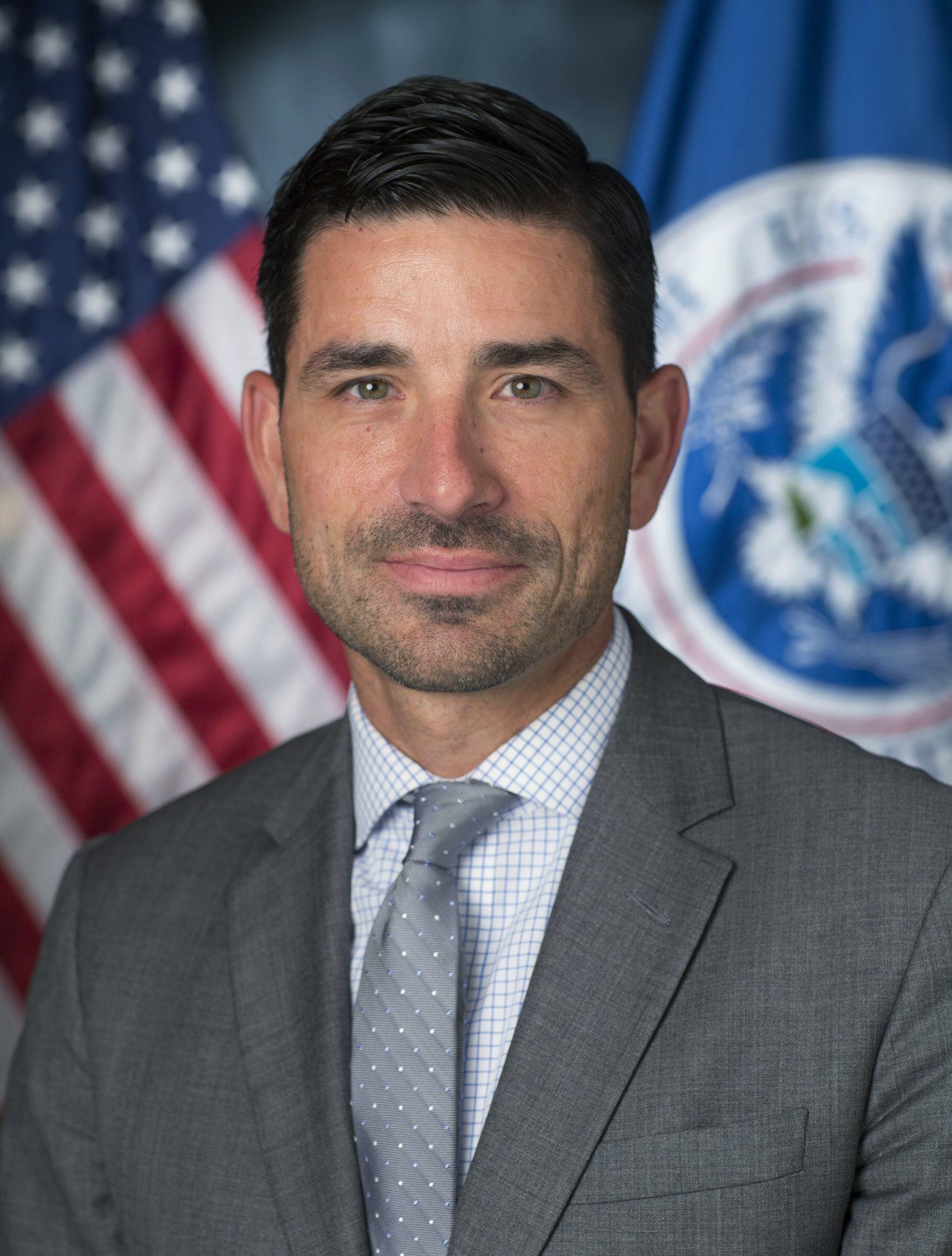
- Official portrait, 2017

Executive Director of the America First Policy Institute
- Incumbent
- Assumed office February 13, 2025
- Preceded by: Brooke Rollins (President)

Acting United States Secretary of Homeland Security
- De facto, unlawful
- In office November 13, 2019 – January 11, 2021
- President: Donald Trump
- Deputy: Ken Cuccinelli (acting)
- Preceded by: Kevin McAleenan (acting)
- Succeeded by: Pete Gaynor (acting)

Under Secretary of Homeland Security for Strategy, Policy, and Plans
- In office November 13, 2019 – January 20, 2021; Acting: February 8, 2019 – November 13, 2019
- President: Donald Trump
- Preceded by: James D. Nealon (acting)
- Succeeded by: Robert P. Silvers

Assistant Secretary of Homeland Security for Strategy, Plans, Analysis, and Risk
- In office February 8, 2018 – November 13, 2019
- President: Donald Trump
- Preceded by: Brodi Kotila
- Succeeded by: Position abolished

Chief of Staff to the United States Secretary of Homeland Security
- In office July 31, 2017 – February 8, 2019
- President: Donald Trump
- Preceded by: Kirstjen Nielsen
- Succeeded by: Miles Taylor

Personal details
- Born: Chad Fredrick Wolf; June 21, 1976 (age 50) Jackson, Mississippi, U.S.
- Party: Republican
- Spouse: Hope Wolf
- Children: 2
- Education: Collin College; Southern Methodist University (BA); Villanova University (GrCert)

Chad Fredrick Wolf (born June 21, 1976) is an American former government official and lobbyist who was named the acting United States secretary of homeland security in November 2019. His appointment was ruled unlawful in November 2020. Wolf was also the under secretary of homeland security for strategy, policy, and plans from 2019 to 2021.

A member of the Republican Party, Wolf previously served in several positions in the Department of Homeland Security (DHS), including as chief of staff of the Transportation Security Administration (TSA) and chief of staff to DHS secretary Kirstjen Nielsen. From 2005 to 2016, he was a lobbyist, helping clients secure contracts from TSA. Wolf was an architect of the Trump administration family separation policy in 2018, and was prominently involved in the deployment of federal law enforcement forces in Portland and elsewhere beginning in July 2020.

In September 2020, a whistleblower accused him of having ordered staff to stop reporting on threats from Russia. In November 2020, District Judge Nicholas Garaufis ruled Wolf's appointment unlawful, and overturned a set of Wolf's orders as "not an exercise of legal authority". Wolf resigned his post on January 11, 2021, after a number of similar court rulings.

== Early life and education ==
Wolf was born to James B. (Jim) Wolf and Cinda Thompson Wolf in Jackson, Mississippi. He grew up in Plano, Texas. He graduated from Plano East Senior High School and then attended Collin College on a tennis scholarship. He then transferred to Southern Methodist University, where he earned a Bachelor of Arts in history.

In 2013, he received a professional non-credit certificate in contract management from Villanova University in Villanova, Pennsylvania.

== Early career ==
=== Congressional staffer ===
Wolf worked as a staffer for Republican Senators Phil Gramm, Kay Bailey Hutchison, and then for two and a half years with Chuck Hagel. From 2002 to 2005, he worked in the Transportation Security Administration (TSA), becoming Assistant Administrator for Transportation Security Policy in 2005. It was during this time he first worked with Kirstjen Nielsen.

=== Lobbyist ===
From October 2005 to 2016, Wolf was vice president and senior director at Wexler & Walker, a now defunct lobbying firm. He helped clients obtain contracts from the TSA.

== First Trump administration ==
In March 2017, Wolf became chief of staff at the Transportation Security Administration. He served in that position for four months, then became Department of Homeland Security (DHS) Deputy Chief of Staff and the top aide to Deputy Secretary Elaine Duke.

In July 2017, Wolf became chief of staff to DHS Secretary Kirstjen Nielsen. While working for Nielsen, according to congressional testimony, he was not involved in the development of the family separation policy and his function was to provide information to Nielsen and "not to determine whether it was the right or wrong policy". Wolf has said he "supported the President's decision when he issued an executive order to stop that practice".

Wolf then became Assistant Secretary of Homeland Security for Strategy, Plans, Analysis and Risk, a Senior Executive Service position not subject to Senate confirmation. He concurrently served as Acting Under Secretary of Homeland Security for Strategy, Policy, and Plans. He was nominated in February 2019 to serve permanently as Under Secretary, and his confirmation hearing was held that June.

=== Acting Secretary of Homeland Security ===
Wolf began serving as Acting Secretary of Homeland Security in November 2019. In November 2020, a federal court ruled his appointment unlawful and overturned a set of his orders. On January 6, 2021, Trump formally withdrew his nomination of Wolf. Wolf resigned on January 11, 2021.

==== Appointment ====
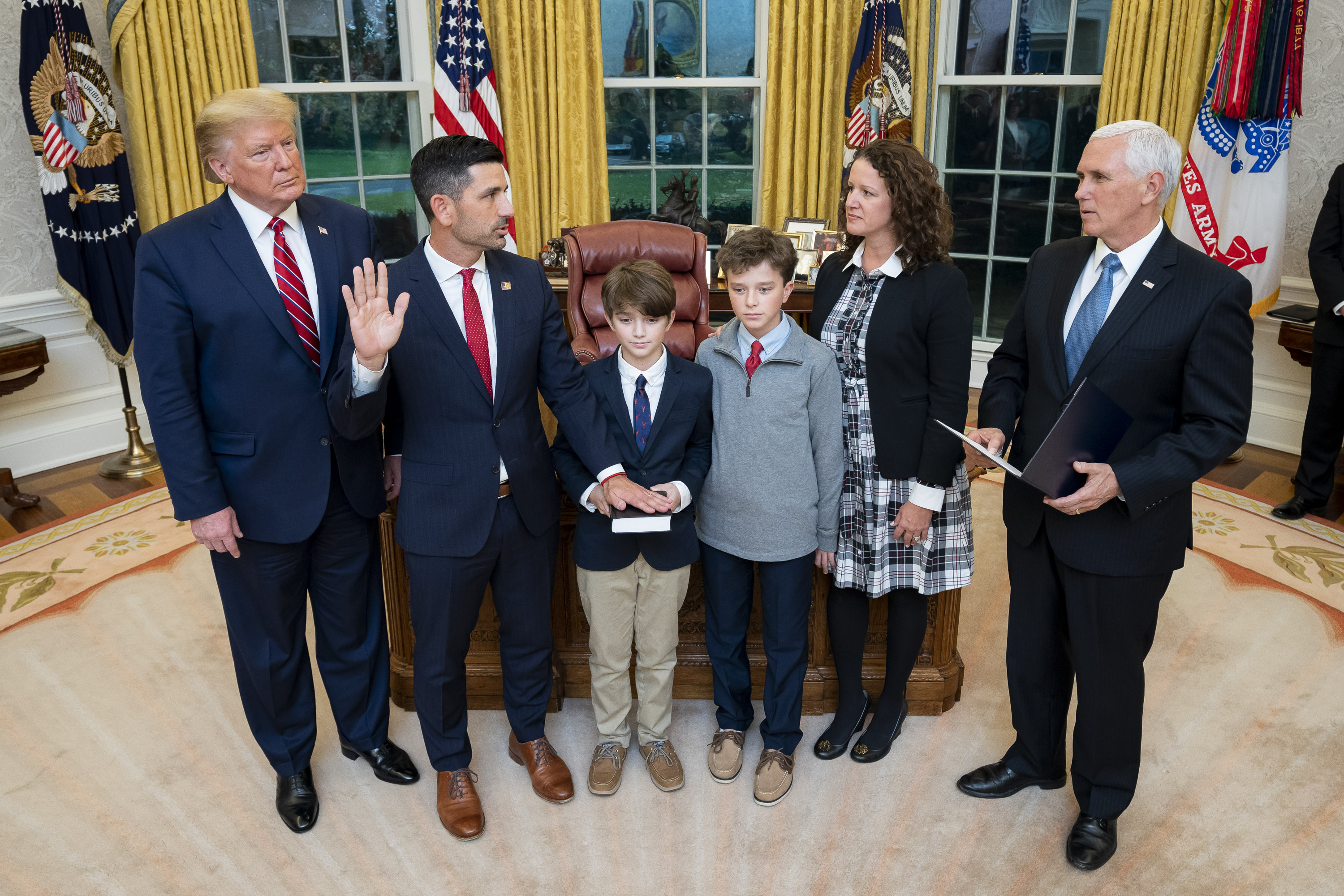
Wolf and his family as he is sworn in by then Vice President Mike Pence as Acting Secretary of Homeland Security in November 2019

Wolf's appointment as Acting Secretary of Homeland Security came after Kevin McAleenan's departure was announced on November 1, 2019.

The administration waited for Wolf's confirmation as Under Secretary before appointing him Acting Secretary to avoid appointing him as a principal officer from a non-Senate-confirmed position. DHS then had to move the Under Secretary position earlier in the line of succession, because the 210-day period in which an acting official was eligible to be named without a pending permanent nomination had expired. This, in turn, mandated that the Secretary's duties had to be performed by the department's senior-most confirmed official.

Wolf was confirmed as Under Secretary on November 13, 2019, on a 54–41 vote. He was sworn in as Acting Secretary the same day.

==== Dispute ====
On November 15, 2019, House Democrats Bennie Thompson and Carolyn Maloney requested that the Comptroller General of the United States review the legality of Wolf's appointment on the basis that former Acting Secretary Kevin McAleenan did not have authority to change the department's line of succession, asserting that former Secretary Nielsen had not properly placed McAleenan first in the line of succession before resigning and that McAleenan's change came after the 210-day limit to his authority had expired.

On August 14, 2020, the Government Accountability Office (GAO) argued that Wolf had become Acting Secretary improperly. A number of federal courts later ruled that Wolf's appointment was invalid for reasons similar to those given by the GAO and issued orders on procedural grounds barring enforcement of rules Wolf had created.

==== Nomination to permanent appointment ====
On August 24, 2020, Trump announced that he would nominate Wolf as the permanent Secretary of Homeland Security. Wolf was expected to continue to serve as Acting Secretary during the confirmation process, as his acting appointment was made under the Homeland Security Act of 2002 and not the Federal Vacancies Reform Act of 1998, which prevents most nominees from simultaneously acting in the same position. On September 10, 2020, the nomination was formally submitted to the Senate. On September 23, 2020, Wolf appeared before the Senate Committee on Homeland Security and Governmental Affairs. The committee reported his nomination favorably on September 30, but the full Senate took no further action before the end of the 116th Congress.

On January 3, 2021, Wolf's nomination was resubmitted to the 117th Congress, but on January 6, it was formally withdrawn.

==== Tenure ====
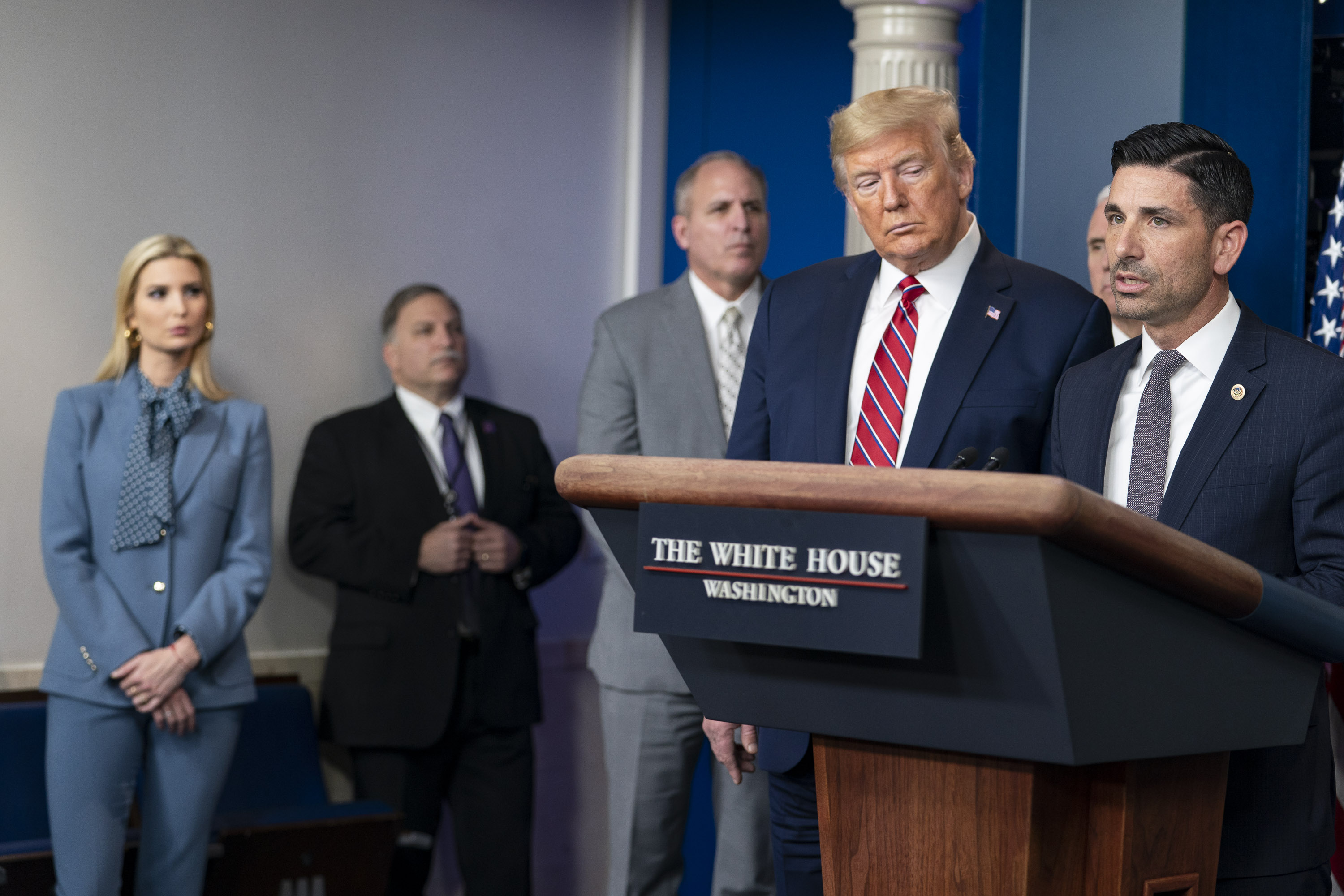
Wolf briefs the White House press corps on the COVID-19 pandemic in March 2020.

Wolf maintained a low public profile during the early part of his term, prior to the deployment of federal law enforcement forces in Portland, Oregon, and elsewhere in response to rioting beginning in July 2020.

In 2017, the U.S. Department of Homeland Security awarded $6 million in contracts to Berkeley Research Group, where Wolf's wife, Hope Wolf, is an executive.

In February 2020, Wolf announced that the Trump administration was revoking New York residents' ability to participate in Global Entry and other Trusted Traveler programs, in response to the state's "sanctuary" immigration policies, which DHS said jeopardized the government's ability to effectively vet travelers. New York subsequently changed its law that had prevented sharing of information with federal law enforcement officers to expressly allow for information-sharing of New York Department of Motor Vehicles records "as necessary for an individual seeking acceptance into a trusted traveler program, or to facilitate vehicle imports and/or exports", and the DHS then removed the Global Entry restrictions.

During his tenure as head of the DHS, Wolf redirected resources in the DHS toward antifa, a loose movement of left-wing activists. In spring 2020, Wolf redirected staff reporting on alleged Russian interference in the 2020 election, ordering former head of DHS intelligence Brian Murphy to instead focus his reports on potential threats from Iran and China.

In September 2020, Wolf defied a subpoena to testify before the House Committee on Homeland Security.

In October 2020, Wolf sent Twitter CEO Jack Dorsey a letter calling on him to "commit to never again censoring content" on Twitter.

On January 11, 2021, Wolf resigned, with FEMA Administrator Pete Gaynor as his replacement. He remained in his Under Secretary position. In his resignation letter, he cited "recent events, including the ongoing and meritless court rulings regarding the validity of my authority as Acting Secretary."

==== 2020 response to Portland riots ====
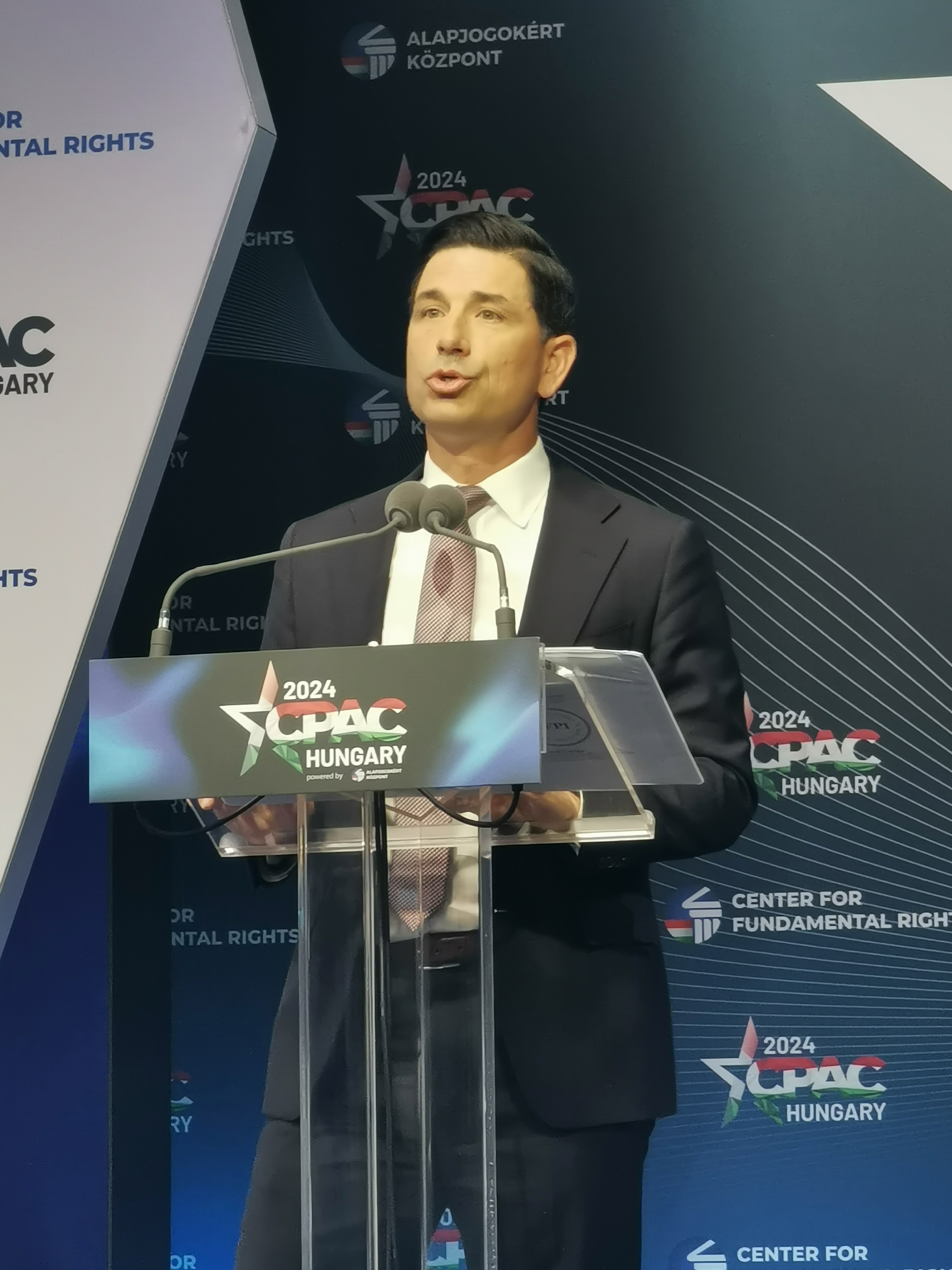
Speaking at CPAC Hungary 2024

In July 2020, the Trump administration deployed federal law enforcement forces to Portland, Oregon, to help guard the federal courthouse against protesters who threw fireworks, frozen water bottles and balloons filled with paint and feces, which broke courthouse windows and that set parts of the courthouse on fire multiple times.

Oregon Governor Kate Brown, Portland Mayor Ted Wheeler, and Tom Ridge, the first head of DHS, criticized the deployment. Wolf argued that the protesters were a "violent mob" and "violent anarchists". The Department of Homeland Security (DHS) cited an executive order regarding "monuments, memorials and statues" as allowing federal officers to be deployed without the permission of individual U.S. states, as the federal government "has the right to enforce federal laws, investigate crimes and make arrests" within states.

== Post-Trump administration ==
=== The Heritage Foundation ===
Wolf is a former visiting fellow at the Heritage Foundation.

=== Wolf Global Advisors ===
In 2021, Wolf launched a consulting firm, Wolf Global Advisors, along with three other former Trump administration DHS officials.

== Personal life ==
Wolf is married to Hope Wolf and has two sons.

== Notes ==
Political offices
Preceded by James D. Nealon; Acting	Under Secretary of Homeland Security for Strategy, Policy, and Plans; 2019–2021	Succeeded by Robert P. Silvers
Preceded by Kevin McAleenan; Acting	United States Secretary of Homeland Security; Acting; 2019–2021	Succeeded by Pete Gaynor; Acting
