= Brodi Kotila =

American political scientist

Dr. Brodi Kotila

Assistant Secretary for Strategy, Plans, Analysis and Risk, U.S. Department of Homeland Security
- In office 2015–2017
- Preceded by: Alan D. Cohn
- Succeeded by: Chad Wolf

Personal details
- Education: University of California; Yale Law School; Harvard University
- Occupation: Politics, Lawyer

Brodi Kotila is an American political scientist who previously served as Assistant Secretary for Strategy, Plans, Analysis and Risk and Principal Deputy Assistant Secretary for Policy at the U.S. Department of Homeland Security.

She received a PhD and master's degree in political science from Harvard University, a J.D. from Yale Law School, and a B.A. in political science from the University of California, Berkeley.

She is currently a Senior Political Scientist at the nonpartisan RAND Corporation.

== Career ==
Brodi previously served as Chief of Staff to the Under Secretary of the United States Army, Special Counsel to the Department of Defense General Counsel, and lead for veterans and military family policy at the White House Domestic Policy Council before joining the Department of Homeland Security; she was also an officer in the United States Navy Reserve and a member of the Bar Association in Massachusetts.
