= 2012 Virginia ballot measures =

The 2012 Virginia State Elections took place on Election Day, November 6, 2012, the same day as the Presidential, U.S. Senate and U.S. House elections in the state. The only statewide elections on the ballot were two constitutional referendums to amend the Virginia State Constitution. Because Virginia state elections are held on off-years, no statewide officers or state legislative elections were held. Both referendums were referred to the voters by the Virginia General Assembly.

== Question 1 ==
The amendment amended Section 11 of Article I of the state constitution to prohibit eminent domain from being used for private enterprise, job creation, tax revenue generation or economic development, thereby restricting it to only being invoked to take private land for public use. The measure was part of a political response to the United States Supreme Court's ruling in Kelo v. City of New London, which approved the use of eminent domain to seize private property for private uses that had public benefit. It was sponsored in Virginia House of Delegates by Del. Robert B. Bell. After passing the General Assembly twice, in accordance with state law, it was put before the voters. It was supported by controversial Virginia Attorney General Ken Cuccinelli and the Virginia Farm Bureau, and opposed by The Washington Post editorial board.

Question 1
Choice	Votes	%
For	2,661,547	74.45
Against	913,201	25.55
Total	3,574,748	100.00
Registered voters/turnout		65.85
Source: - Official Results

== Question 2 ==
The amendment amended Section 6 of Article IV of the state constitution to allow the General Assembly to vote to delay the start of its veto session by up to one week, with the intention of avoiding conflict with religious holidays such as Passover and Holy Week.

Question 2
Choice	Votes	%
For	2,877,171	81.91
Against	635,319	18.09
Total	3,512,490	100.00
Registered voters/turnout		64.70
Source: - Official Results
