= Ken Cuccinelli =

American politician (born 1968)

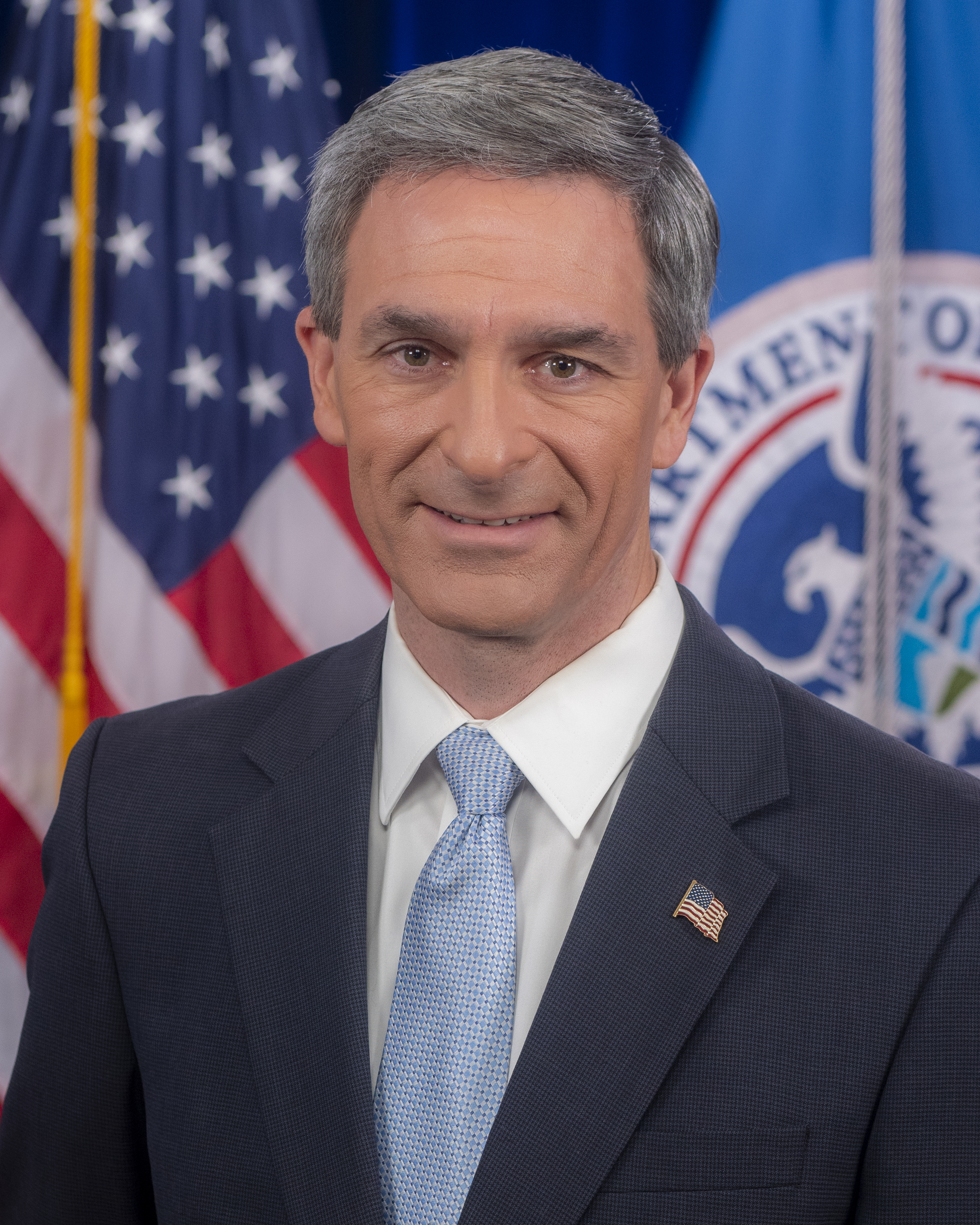
- Official portrait, 2019

Acting United States Deputy Secretary of Homeland Security
- De facto, unlawful
- In office November 13, 2019 – January 20, 2021
- President: Donald Trump
- Preceded by: David Pekoske (acting)
- Succeeded by: David Pekoske (acting)

Acting Director of the United States Citizenship and Immigration Services
- De facto, unlawful
- In office June 10, 2019 – November 18, 2019
- President: Donald Trump
- Preceded by: Mark Koumans (acting)
- Succeeded by: Mark Koumans (acting)

Principal Deputy Director of the United States Citizenship and Immigration Services
- In office June 10, 2019 – January 20, 2021
- President: Donald Trump
- Preceded by: Office established
- Succeeded by: Office abolished

46th Attorney General of Virginia
- In office January 16, 2010 – January 11, 2014
- Governor: Bob McDonnell
- Preceded by: Bill Mims
- Succeeded by: Mark Herring

Member of the Virginia Senate from the 37th district
- In office August 19, 2002 – January 12, 2010
- Preceded by: Warren E. Barry
- Succeeded by: David W. Marsden

Personal details
- Born: Kenneth Thomas Cuccinelli II; July 30, 1968 (age 58) Edison, New Jersey, U.S.
- Party: Republican
- Spouse: Alice Monteiro Davis (m. 1991)
- Children: 7
- Education: University of Virginia (BS); George Mason University (MA, JD)
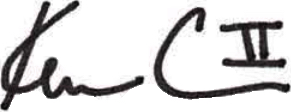
- Signature

Kenneth Thomas "Cooch" Cuccinelli II (/ˌkuːtʃɪˈnɛli/ KOO-chin-EL-ee; born July 30, 1968) is an American lawyer and politician who served as the senior official performing the duties of deputy secretary of homeland security from 2019 to 2021. A member of the Republican Party, he also served as the principal deputy and acting director of U.S. Citizenship and Immigration Services (USCIS) and was attorney general of Virginia from 2010 to 2014.

Cuccinelli previously served in the Virginia Senate, representing the 37th district in Fairfax County from 2002 until 2010, and as the 46th attorney general of Virginia from 2010 until 2014. Cuccinelli was the Republican nominee for Governor of Virginia in the 2013 Virginia gubernatorial election, losing to the Democratic nominee, Terry McAuliffe.

A self-described opponent of homosexuality, Cuccinelli in his position as Virginia attorney general defended anti-sodomy laws and prohibitions on same-sex marriage. Cuccinelli rejects the scientific consensus on climate change, and in his position as attorney general investigated climate scientists whom he accused of fraud. Characterized as an immigration hard-liner, Cuccinelli sought to prohibit undocumented immigrants from attending universities, repeal birthright citizenship, and force employees to speak English in the workplace.

His appointment as acting USCIS director during Donald Trump's first administration was ruled unlawful by U.S. District Judge Randolph Moss in March 2020, who found it to be in violation of the Federal Vacancies Reform Act of 1998. Later that year, the Government Accountability Office found that his appointment as the acting deputy secretary to have been illegal as well.

== Early life and education ==
Cuccinelli was born in Edison, New Jersey, the son of Maribeth (née Reilly) and Kenneth Thomas Cuccinelli. His father is of Italian descent and his mother is of Irish ancestry. He attended Gonzaga College High School in Washington, D.C., where he graduated in 1986, and received a BS in mechanical engineering from the University of Virginia, a JD from George Mason University School of Law, and an MA in international commerce and policy, also from George Mason University. In 1993 Cuccinelli entered the United States Marine Corps, but was discharged after failing to complete his initial training and did only one week on active duty.

== Career ==
Cuccinelli co-founded a general practice law firm in Fairfax, Virginia.

=== Virginia State Senate (2002–2010) ===
Cuccinelli ran for the state Senate in the 37th District in an August 2002 special election. He defeated Democrat Catherine Belter 55%–45%. In 2003, he was re-elected to his first full term, defeating Democrat Jim E. Mitchell III 53% to 47%. In 2007, he barely won re-election to his second full term, narrowly defeating Democrat Janet Oleszek by a 0.3-point margin, a difference of just 92 votes out of about 37,000 votes cast.

=== Attorney general of Virginia (2010–2014) ===
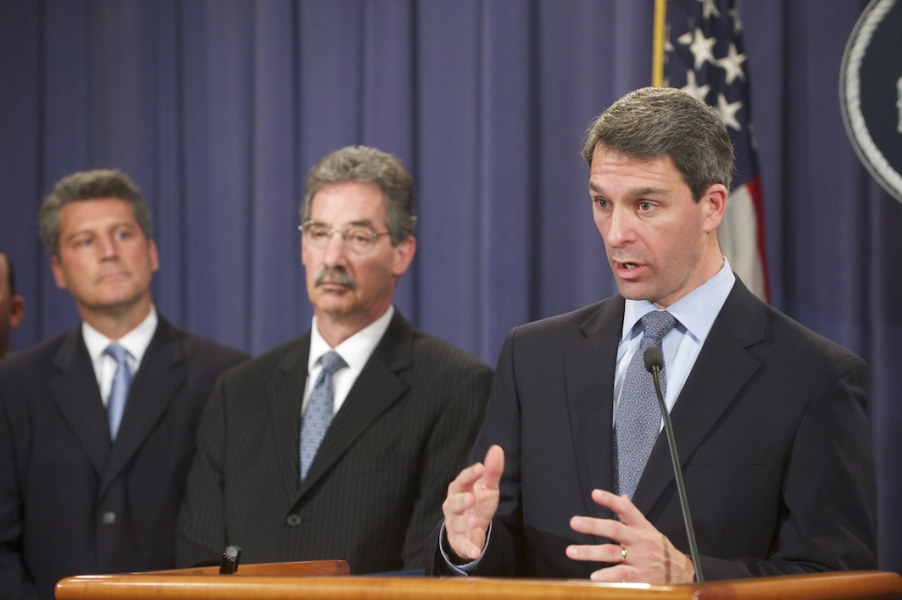
Cuccinelli (right), as Virginia attorney general, at a U.S. Department of Justice press conference announcing a resolution of Abbott Laboratories' off-label promotion of its drug Depakote in May 2012

In 2009, Cuccinelli was selected as the Republican nominee for attorney general, going on to win 58% of the vote (1,123,816 votes). Republican Bob McDonnell became governor, and Bill Bolling was re-elected as lieutenant governor. Cuccinelli was inaugurated on January 16, 2010.

In 2010, Cuccinelli was the first attorney general to file a federal lawsuit (Virginia v. Sebelius) challenging the constitutionality of the Affordable Care Act (Obamacare). During his 2013 run for governor, Cuccinelli opposed the ACA's Medicaid expansion.

In July 2010, Cuccinelli joined eight other states in filing an amicus brief opposing the federal government's lawsuit challenging an Arizona immigration enforcement statute. In August 2010, Cuccinelli authorized law enforcement officials to investigate the immigration status of anyone that they stopped.

Cuccinelli rejects the scientific consensus on climate change. In 2010, Cuccinelli sought judicial review of the Environmental Protection Agency's finding that greenhouse gasses endanger public health. In 2012, a three-judge panel of the United States Court of Appeals for the District of Columbia Circuit rejected Cuccinelli's arguments. In 2010, Cuccinelli announced he would challenge the March 2010 standards for motor vehicle fuel efficiency specified in the Clean Air Act. In April 2010, as part of the attorney general of Virginia's climate science investigation, Cuccinelli served a civil investigative demand on the University of Virginia seeking a broad range of documents related to climate researcher Michael E. Mann. On August 30, 2010, Judge Paul M. Peatross Jr. ruled that "the nature of the conduct is not stated so that any reasonable person could glean what Dr. Mann did to violate the statute." Cuccinelli appealed the case to the Virginia Supreme Court, which ruled that Cuccinelli did not have the authority to make these demands. The outcome was hailed as a victory for academic freedom.

Cuccinelli opposes homosexuality, describing homosexual acts as "against nature" and "harmful to society." Cuccinelli opposes same-sex marriage. He has argued against the constitutionality of same-sex marriages. In 2010, Cuccinelli called on Virginia universities to remove " 'sexual orientation,' 'gender identity,' 'gender expression,' or like classification, as a protected class within its nondiscrimination policy, absent specific authorization from the General Assembly."

He defended the constitutionality of Virginia laws prohibiting sodomy. In March 2013, a panel of the U.S. Court of Appeals struck down Virginia's anti-sodomy law, finding it unconstitutional based on the Supreme Court's 2003 ruling in Lawrence v. Texas. On June 25, 2013, Cuccinelli filed an appeal with the U.S. Supreme Court, but in October 2013 the Supreme Court denied Cuccinelli's appeal. On November 24, 2010, Cuccinelli issued a legal opinion that police, school administrators, and teachers could search students' cell phones on the basis of reasonable suspicions in order to deter cyberbullying and "sexting." The ACLU and the Rutherford Institute said that Cuccinelli's opinion was in error, lacking a legal foundation.

Since 2007, his office negotiated settlements of almost $8 million representing refunds from eight auto-title lenders, filed a lawsuit against CNC Financial Services, Inc. for charging interest rates of 300 percent or more, and filed two separate lawsuits against two Virginia Beach-based mortgage modification companies for charging customers up to $1,200 in illegal advance fees. He was involved in passing legislation targeting human trafficking.

=== 2013 Virginia gubernatorial candidacy ===
After his election as attorney general, it was speculated that Cuccinelli was a potential candidate for governor in the 2013 election or for the United States Senate in 2014. Cuccinelli himself stated that he was considering running for the Senate. Two days later, one of his aides said, "We haven't ruled out anything. He's not actively considering a run for any particular office at the moment. Ken is operating under the assumption that he will run for reelection [in 2013]. He hasn't ruled out any option besides running for president, which he has no desire to do."

On November 30, 2011, The Washington Post reported that Cuccinelli would announce within days that he was running for governor in 2013; the next day, Cuccinelli confirmed that he would run. Cuccinelli said he would continue serving as attorney general during his run. He is the first attorney general since 1985 to remain in office while seeking the governorship rather than resign the position while seeking the office, a precedent that the last six attorneys general to run for governor have adhered to.

Cuccinelli lost to Terry McAuliffe on November 5, 2013, by 56,435 votes, or 2.5% of total ballots cast. The Libertarian Party candidate, Robert Sarvis, received 146,084 votes, or 6.5% of the vote total.

=== Business and politics (2014–2017) ===
In 2014, Cuccinelli was involved with the co-founding of an oyster farming company in Tangier, Virginia.

In the 2016 presidential election, Cuccinelli served as an advisor to Ted Cruz's campaign, leading the campaign's effort to win delegates for Cruz at the 2016 Republican National Convention.

In early polls on the 2017 gubernatorial race, Cuccinelli was a frontrunner for the Republican nomination. However, in April 2016, Cuccinelli announced that he would not run for governor in 2017.

In May 2016, Cuccinelli was named general counsel of the FreedomWorks Foundation, where he helps state attorneys general who want to oppose a federal regulation.

In January 2017, Cuccinelli filed a legal brief on behalf of the Virginia Poverty Law Center, challenging a 2015 law which freezes base electricity rates charged by Dominion Power, one of the state's most powerful corporations, and Appalachian Power Company. The basis of the brief is that the law allows these semi-public electric utility companies to charge excess rates. Cuccinelli said "This is a legalized transfer [of money] from poorer Virginians to two utility companies. It is unfair and unjust and unconstitutional, and it's bad policy."

=== De facto acting USCIS director (2019–2021) ===
"Press Briefing with acting director of U.S. Citizenship and Immigration Services Ken Cuccinelli," video from the White House

Cuccinelli was appointed to serve as the principal deputy director of the United States Citizenship and Immigration Services (USCIS) in June 2019, allowing him to become the acting director of the United States Citizenship and Immigration Services.

As the administrator of USCIS, Cuccinelli was in charge of the systems for legal immigration and naturalization. He said that he regarded access to immigration as a privilege, not a right, and that "we are not a benefit agency, we are a vetting agency."

==== Appointment controversy ====
Cuccinelli was appointed acting director when leading Senators indicated he had little chance of Senate confirmation as permanent director. He was first appointed to a newly created position of "principal deputy director," which according to Department of Homeland Security officials allowed him to then be appointed as acting director under the Federal Vacancies Reform Act (FVRA).

The appointment as acting director of USCIS may have circumvented the Federal Vacancies Reform Act, according to the chairs of the House committees on Judiciary, Homeland Security, and Government Oversight. FVRA stipulates eligibility criteria for temporarily filling positions that require Senate confirmation. Before being considered for the position, Cuccinelli had met none of the eligibility criteria. In a letter to the acting secretary of homeland security, the House committee chairs alleged that the brief appointment to "principal deputy director" had been retroactively applied, possibly in violation of the law. The USCIS employees union also challenged the legality of Cuccinelli's appointment.

In September 2019, a lawsuit was filed challenging his asylum directives, partially on the basis that his appointment was invalid. On March 1, 2020, US District Court Judge Randolph D. Moss ruled that Cuccinelli was not lawfully appointed to serve as acting director and therefore lacked authority to issue two of the directives challenged in the lawsuit. Because the case was not filed as a class action, Moss was "unconvinced" that his relief should be extended to other asylum seekers not part of the original suit. On August 12, 2020, the government dropped its appeal in the case.

==== Tenure in office ====
In July 2019, Cuccinelli blamed an asylum seeker for the asylum seeker's own death and that of his daughter, both of whom had been found dead on the banks of the Rio Grande River. He said, "The reason we have tragedies like that on the border is because those folks, that father didn't want to wait to go through the asylum process in the legal fashion, so decided to cross the river." He said in an interview that the administration is prepared to deport approximately 1 million undocumented immigrants who have final removal orders already in place.

On August 12, 2019, Cuccinelli announced a revised regulation, to go into effect October 15, 2019, expanding the public charge requirements for legal immigration. Green cards and visas can be denied if people are likely to need federal, state and local government benefits including food stamps, housing vouchers and Medicaid. When asked whether this change contradicted the poem welcoming the impoverished and persecuted engraved at the base of the Statue of Liberty, Cuccinelli offered a revision, "Give me your tired and your poor who can stand on their own two feet and who will not become a public charge." The original poem, Emma Lazarus's "The New Colossus," states "Give me your tired, your poor, your huddled masses yearning to breathe free, The wretched refuse of your teeming shore." Cuccinelli asserted the new requirements were consistent with the public charge laws, which first passed in 1882: the same era as the poem. He further asserted that the poem referred to European immigrants, though these assertions were disputed by Lazarus's biographer.

In October 2019, Ken Cuccinelli testified to a congressional investigation that he alone had made the decision to end the medical deferred action program, a decision which he reversed after public outcry, and complaints from some patients in the U.S. for medical care that they would die if deported to their home countries.

On March 1, 2020, the United States District Court for the District of Columbia ruled that Cuccinelli's appointment as USCIS director was illegal because the newly created principal deputy director role did not count as a "first assistant" under the Federal Vacancies Reform Act of 1998 because he had never served in a subordinate role to any other USCIS official. This decision caused the suspension of all directives issued by him.

=== De facto acting deputy secretary of homeland security ===
==== Appointment controversy ====
On November 13, 2019, newly sworn-in acting secretary of homeland security Chad Wolf named Cuccinelli to be the acting deputy secretary of homeland security. Cuccinelli continued to serve concurrently in the acting USCIS director role.

The legality of this appointment was unclear; House Committee on Homeland Security Chair Bennie Thompson called the appointment "legally questionable," while University of Texas School of Law professor Stephen Vladeck said that "because Congress has not, by law, specified which position is 'first assistant' to the deputy secretary, this move is technically legal," despite "messing up the entire DHS line of succession in order to pull this off."

On November 15, House Democrats requested that the comptroller general of the United States review the legality of this appointment and Chad Wolf's as acting secretary on the basis that former acting secretary Kevin McAleenan did not have authority to change the department's line of succession. On August 14, 2020, the Government Accountability Office issued a decision confirming that his appointment as acting deputy secretary illegal on this basis.

==== Tenure ====
Cuccinelli was appointed as a member of the White House Coronavirus Task Force on January 29, 2020.

U.S. Senator Kamala Harris questions Cuccinelli during his testimony about the federal response to COVID-19 pandemic in March 2020

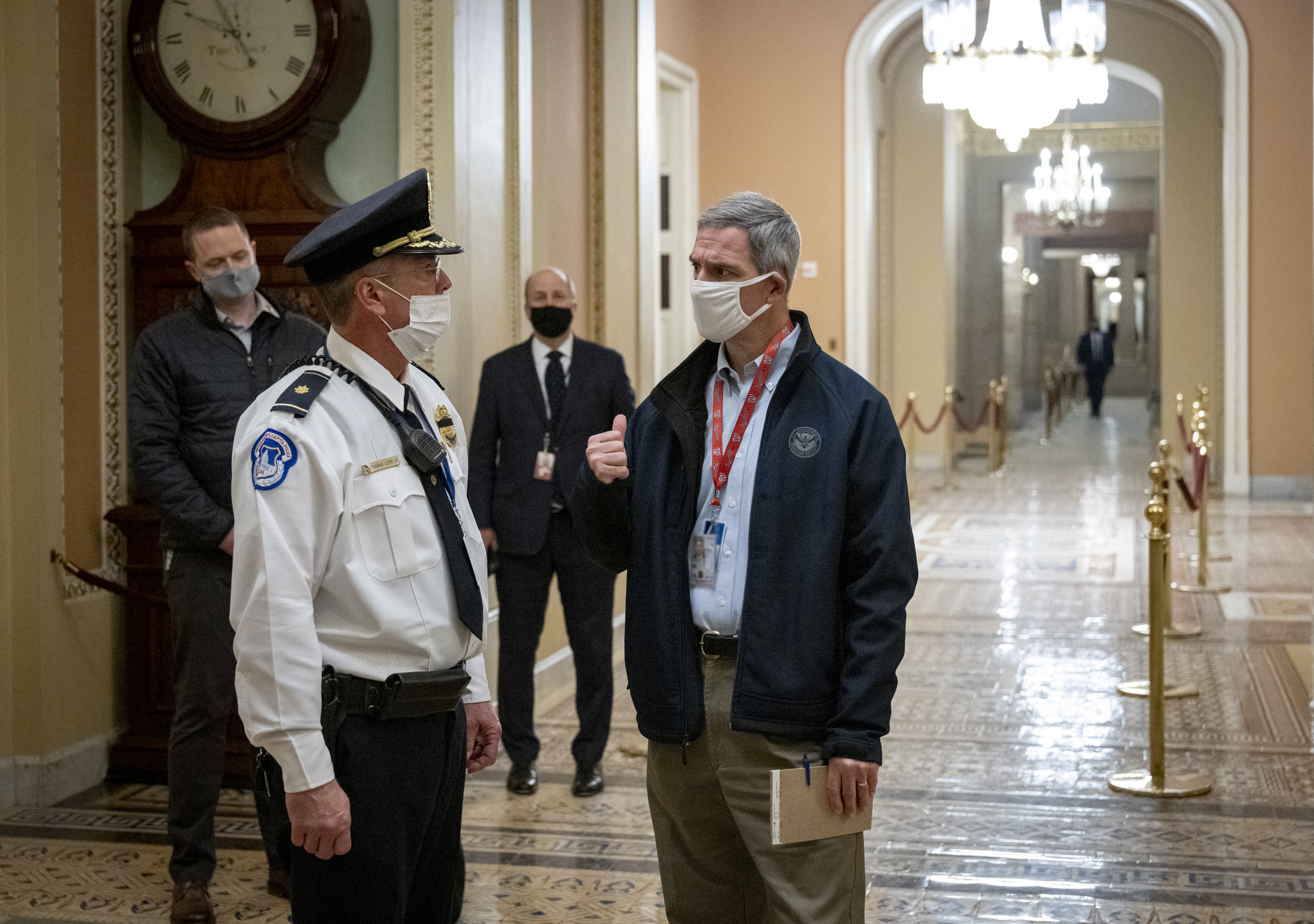
Cuccinelli tours the U.S. Capitol following the January 6, 2021, storming in his capacity as acting deputy secretary

In July 2020, amid the coronavirus pandemic, the Department of Homeland Security announced that international students in the United States would be deported unless they took in-person classes at universities in the United States. At the time, many universities were considering online-only models or hybrid in-person/online classes in order to safeguard the health of students and staff, as well as to halt the spread of the coronavirus. Cuccinelli defended the policy, saying "there isn't a reason" for international students to remain in the United States unless classes are in-person. He also said that the intent behind the announcement was to encourage universities to have in-person classes during the pandemic. The United States issued nearly 400,000 F1 and M visas (student visas) in 2019. On July 8, 2020, Harvard filed pleadings together with MIT in the US District Court in Boston seeking a temporary restraining order prohibiting enforcement of the order.

That same month, Cuccinelli defended the deployment of federal agents dressed in camouflage and tactical gear to Portland, Oregon, where they picked up protestors and took them away in unmarked vehicles.

Under his tenure, Cuccinelli reduced oversight of the DHS's intelligence arm, making it unnecessary for it to get approval from the DHS's civil liberties office before producing intelligence products. After the change, the DHS's intelligence arm began compiling intelligence reports on journalists who covered the deployment of DHS agents to Portland, Oregon. The intelligence arm also documented communications between protestors on the app Telegram.

According to a whistleblower complaint released in September 2020, Cuccinelli ordered the intelligence branch at DHS to modify its intelligence assessments to downplay the threat posed by white supremacy groups and to instead focus on "left-wing" groups, such as the antifa movement.

Another whistleblower complaint, filed February 1, 2021, asserted that on January 19, 2021, the day before Biden's inauguration, Cuccinelli signed an agreement with the union representing ICE agents which essentially gives the agents the power to determine policy, by requiring prior written consent from the union before any change to policies and functions that affect them can take effect. The complaint said that Cuccinelli's action was an abuse of power intended to "tie Biden's hands" with regard to immigration policy.

=== The Heritage Foundation ===
In February 2021, Cuccinelli was named a visiting fellow at The Heritage Foundation, where he authored five commentary essays for the foundation in 2021 before leaving the foundation at some unannounced date.

In 2023, Cuccinelli authored the chapter on the Department of Homeland Security in the Heritage Foundation's Project 2025 book, Mandate for Leadership: The Conservative Promise.

== Political positions ==
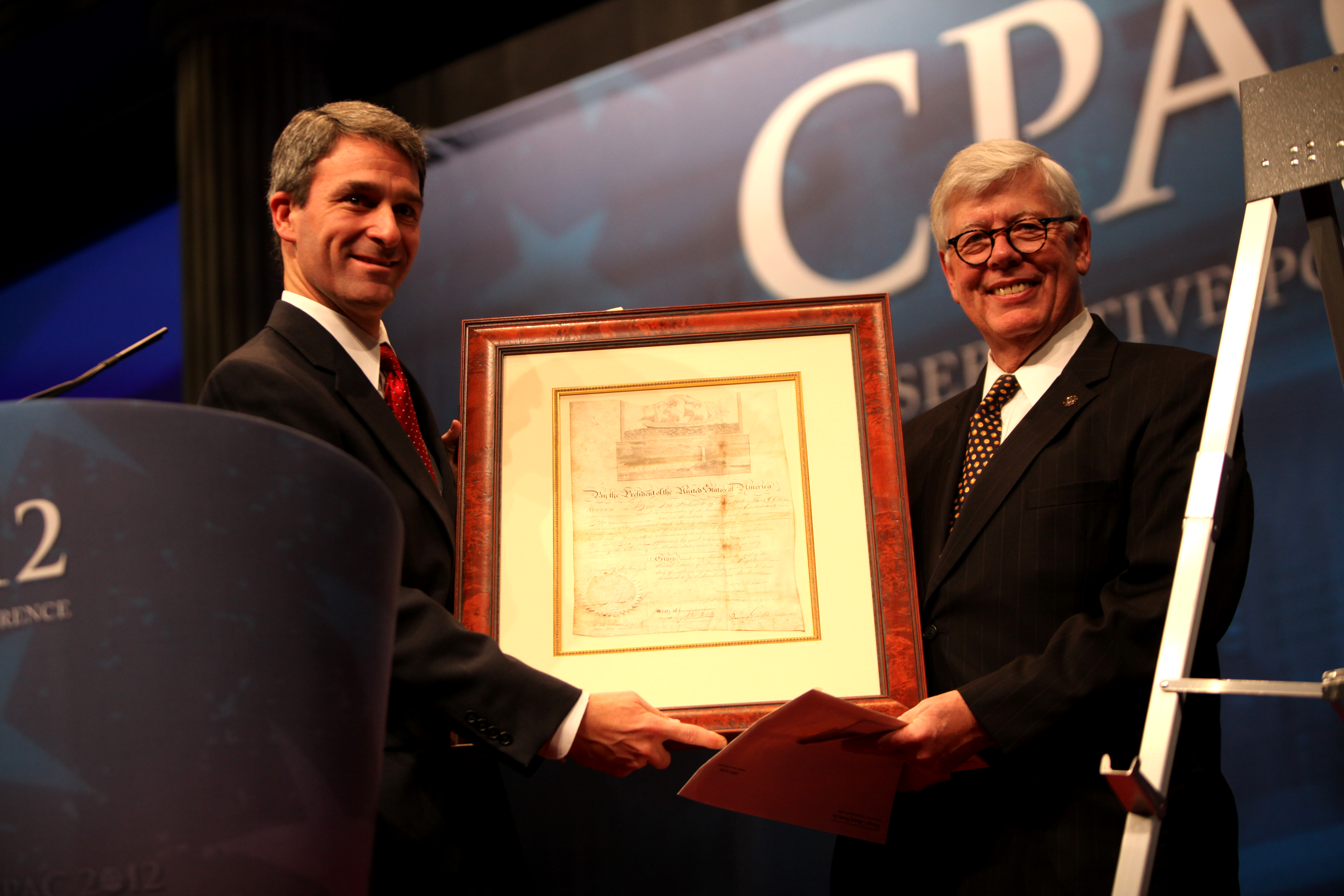
Cuccinelli receiving the "Defender of the Constitution" award from the Conservative Political Action Conference for his work as Virginia attorney general in February 2012

=== Abortion ===
Cuccinelli opposes legal abortion. In November 2008 he was named the Family Foundation of Virginia "Legislator of the Year". Cuccinelli sponsored a number of bills to discourage abortions, including requiring doctors to anesthetize fetuses undergoing late term abortions, altering the licensing and regulation of abortion clinics, and requiring that a doctor save the fetal tissue when performing an abortion on a woman under age 15, for forensic use. As a state senator, he advanced legislation to make abortion clinics subject to the same health and safety standards as outpatient surgical hospitals. He supported two "personhood" bills that sought to provide human embryos with legal rights.

=== Birtherism ===
In 2010, Cuccinelli made statements that appeared to question whether President Barack Obama was born in the United States. He later backed away from the statements.

=== Guns ===
Cuccinelli is a longtime advocate for gun rights. sponsored legislation to repeal the prohibition on carrying a concealed handgun in a restaurant or club, for Virginia to recognize concealed handgun permits from other states, and to shield concealed handgun permit application data from Freedom of Information Act requests. Under Cuccinelli's proposal a person could only be disqualified for such a permit by a court ruling based on the applicant's past actions. In the 2009 legislative session, a bill Cuccinelli introduced was passed that, for the purposes of granting a Virginia concealed handgun permit, required the state to accept as proof of "handgun competence" any certificate from an online handgun safety course featuring an NRA Certified instructor.

Cuccinelli believes that mental illness is the root cause of mass shootings, and that they can be better prevented with more access to mental health care. He has pushed for restricting mentally ill persons from obtaining guns.

=== Legal Challenge to Virginia's 2026 gun laws ===
Cuccinelli filed a novel challenge to Virginia's "Assault Weapons" ban (SB 749 and HB 217) in Curtis, et al. v. Katz, et al. - arguing, in sum, that the prohibitions in SB 749/HB 217 were unconstitutional under Article I, § 13 of the Constitution of Virginia (the "Militia Clause"). Cuccinelli's complaint cited Article I, § 13: "That a well regulated militia, composed of the body of the people, trained to arms, is the proper, natural, and safe defense of a free state" and said that "the breadth of that guarantee is remarkable...without qualification as to sex, age, or other condition. The Virginia Constitution thus embeds the militia concept at its most expansive: not a narrow demographic slice, but the people themselves, armed and trained for the defense of the free State."

Judge William Glover of the Spotsylvania Circuit Court denied the motion for preliminary injunction.

=== Immigration ===
Cuccinelli has been described as an immigration hard-liner. He has supported President Trump's anti-immigration policies. While in Virginia politics, Cuccinelli pushed legislation to force employees to speak English in the workplace. He has sought to repeal birthright citizenship. He sought to ban undocumented immigrants from attending Virginia colleges.

=== Donald Trump ===
During the 2016 Republican National Convention, Cuccinelli led an effort to prevent Donald Trump from receiving the Republican presidential nomination. He was a staunch Ted Cruz supporter during the 2016 Republican Party presidential primaries.

=== Ron DeSantis ===
In March 2023, Cuccinelli launched Never Back Down, a super PAC encouraging Ron DeSantis to enter the 2024 Republican primary.

=== Taxes ===
In 2006, Cuccinelli sent out a fundraising letter that criticized the Virginia Senate's Republican majority for passing a gasoline tax increase. The letter elicited rebuke from fellow Republican Tommy Norment. In his 2013 campaign, Cuccinelli proposed cutting the top individual income rate from 5.75 percent to 5 percent and the corporate income tax rate from 6 percent to 4 percent for a total reduction in tax revenue of about $1.4 billion a year. He has stated that he would offset that lost revenue by slowing the growth of the state's general fund spending and by eliminating unspecified tax exemptions and loopholes.

=== Eminent domain ===
In the 2005, 2006 and 2007 legislative sessions, Cuccinelli worked to pass eminent domain (compulsory purchase) laws that prevented local and state governments from taking private homes and businesses for developers' projects. In April 2010, Cuccinelli told the Roanoke Chamber of Commerce that he wanted to improve the protection of property rights in Virginia's Constitution. "There is no consistency on the application of eminent domain throughout Virginia," he said. In 2012, Cuccinelli championed a constitutional amendment to prohibit eminent domain from being used to take private land for private gain, thus restricting it to being used only for public gain. The amendment was placed on the ballot for a voter referendum in the 2012 general election, and was passed 74%–26%.

=== Law enforcement ===
In 2005, Cuccinelli was the chief patron of SB873, legislation that entitled law enforcement officers to overtime pay from local governments for hours worked while on vacation or other leave.

=== Abstinence-only sex education ===
Cuccinelli has been a strong advocate of the abstinence-only sex education programs with state funding. In November 2007, he said, "The longer you delay the commencement of sexual activity, you have healthier and happier kids and more successful kids."

== Electoral history ==
Virginia Senate Special Election, August 6, 2002
Party	Candidate	Votes	%
Republican	Ken Cuccinelli	10,041	55.01
Democratic	Cathy Belter	8,193	44.89
Independent	Write-in candidates	18	0.10
Total votes		18,252	100

Virginia Senate General Election, November 4, 2003
Party	Candidate	Votes	%
Republican	Ken Cuccinelli	16,762	53.31
Democratic	Jim Mitchell	14,658	46.62
Independent	Write-in candidates	23	0.07
Total votes		31,443	100

Virginia Senate General Election, November 6, 2007
Party	Candidate	Votes	%
Republican	Ken Cuccinelli	18,602	50.02
Democratic	Janet Oleszek	18,510	49.77
Independent	Write-in candidates	73	0.19
Total votes		37,185	100

Virginia Attorney General Election, November 3, 2009
Party	Candidate	Votes	%
Republican	Ken Cuccinelli	1,124,137	57.51
Democratic	Steve Shannon	828,687	42.39
Independent	Write-in candidates	1,772	0.09
Total votes		1,954,596	100

Virginia gubernatorial election, 2013
Party	Candidate	Votes	%
Democratic	Terry McAuliffe	1,069,859	47.75%
Republican	Ken Cuccinelli	1,013,355	45.23%
Libertarian	Robert Sarvis	146,084	6.52%
Write-ins		11,091	0.50%
Plurality		56,504	2.52%

== Personal life ==
Cuccinelli, a Catholic, is married to Alice Monteiro Davis. They met at Gonzaga College High School and were each other's prom dates. They lost touch when Cuccinelli was attending the University of Virginia and Davis was attending James Madison University. Cuccinelli phoned her during their senior year in college, they reconnected, and married in October 1991. They have seven children.

They live in Nokesville in Prince William County, Virginia.

== See also ==
- 2009 Virginia elections
- 2013 Virginia elections

Senate of Virginia
Preceded by Warren Barry	Member from the 37th district 2002–2010	Succeeded by Dave Marsden
Legal offices
Preceded by Bill Mims	Attorney General of Virginia; 2010–2014	Succeeded by Mark Herring
Political offices
Preceded by Mark Koumans; Acting	Director of the United States Citizenship and Immigration Services; Acting; 2019	Succeeded by Mark Koumans; Acting
Preceded by David Pekoske; Acting	United States Deputy Secretary of Homeland Security; Acting; 2019–2021	Succeeded by David Pekoske; Acting
