= Senator Barry =

Senator Barry may refer to:

- Alexander G. Barry (1892–1952), U.S. Senator from Oregon from 1938 to 1939
- Anthony Barry (1901–1983), Senate of Ireland
- Frederick G. Barry (1845–1909), Mississippi State Senate
- Henry W. Barry (1840–1875), Mississippi State Senate
- John S. Barry (1802–1870), Michigan State Senate
- Norman Barry (1897–1988), Illinois State Senate
- Warren E. Barry (1933–2016), Virginia State Senate
- William T. Barry (1784–1835), Kentucky State Senate
