= Robert P. Silvers =

American lawyer and politician

Robert Silvers
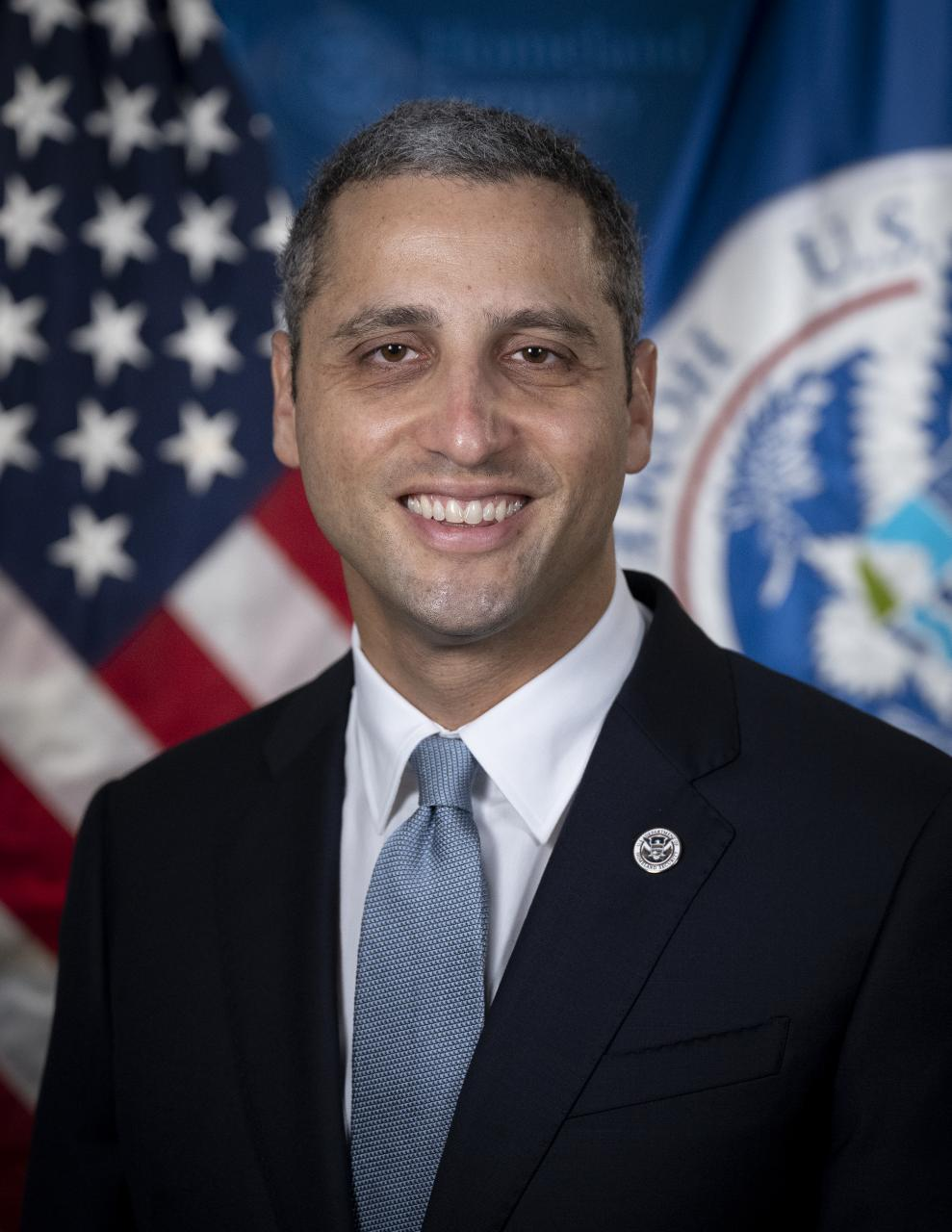

Under Secretary of Homeland Security for Strategy, Policy, and Plans
- In office August 10, 2021 – December 18, 2024
- President: Joe Biden
- Preceded by: Chad Wolf
- Succeeded by: Robert Law

Personal details
- Education: University of Pennsylvania (BA); New York University (JD)

Robert Peter Silvers is an American lawyer and former government official who had served as the Under Secretary of Homeland Security for Strategy, Policy, and Plans. He is a partner at Ropes & Gray.

== Education ==
Silvers received his Bachelor of Arts from the University of Pennsylvania, where he graduated summa cum laude and as valedictorian of the International Relations program, and his Juris Doctor from New York University School of Law.

== Career ==
After law school, he clerked for Judge Kim McLane Wardlaw of the United States Court of Appeals for the Ninth Circuit. Prior to joining DHS, Silvers was an attorney at the international law firms Paul Hastings and O'Melveny & Myers, where he handled complex transnational disputes and investigative matters for his clients. Silvers served as the Obama administration's Assistant Secretary for Cyber Policy at the U.S. Department of Homeland Security (DHS). He was responsible for engagement on cyber defense with the private sector, the federal government's response during significant cyber incidents, and building diplomatic coalitions to confront the most challenging issues involving security and digital innovation. Silvers previously served in other positions at DHS, including as Deputy Chief of Staff, managing execution of policy and operational priorities for the Department's 22 agencies and offices. Silvers is an adjunct professor in the Master of Science in Cybersecurity Risk and Strategy Program co-offered by New York University School of Law and the New York University Tandon School of Engineering. Silvers is a partner at the law firm Paul Hastings LLP and an experienced leader in national and homeland security. Silvers advises companies and boards of directors on cybersecurity, critical infrastructure protection, and other challenges at the intersection of business and security.

=== Under Secretary of Homeland Security ===
In January 2021, Silvers name was suggested for a Department of Homeland Security position. On April 12, 2021, President Joe Biden announced Silvers as the nominee to be the Under Secretary of Homeland Security for Strategy, Policy, and Plans. On April 27, 2021, his nomination was sent to the United States Senate. On May 27, 2021, a hearing on his nomination was held before the Senate Committee on Homeland Security and Governmental Affairs. He was confirmed by the US Senate on August 5, 2021, by Unanimous Consent. He was sworn in on August 10, 2021.

As Under Secretary, Silvers leads DHS's work on counterterrorism, cybersecurity, artificial intelligence safety, disaster response, law enforcement, supply chain security, countering threats coming from the People's Republic of China, and more. He serves as Chair of the U.S. Cyber Safety Review Board, which conducts fact-finding and issues recommendations in the wake of major cybersecurity incidents. Silvers also is at the forefront of the U.S. government's efforts to clamp down on the use of forced labor around the world, serving as Chair of the multi-agency Forced Labor Enforcement Task Force. In 2023, DHS announced the creation of the federal government's first Supply Chain Resilience Center within Silvers' office.

Silvers has been quoted or featured in a number of media articles and fireside chat-style events. On December 10, 2024, Silvers spoke in a fireside chat at the Hope Global Forum about the promise of artificial intelligence to improve security for the American people. On September 27, 2022, Silvers was featured in the Wall Street Journal as leading the federal government’s work to combat forced labor in supply chains, describing the issue as a “top-tier compliance issue” for companies. In 2022, the Wall Street Journal reported on Silvers’ role launching and chairing the U.S. Cyber Safety Review Board. In 2023, CNN reported on Silvers’ role chairing the U.S. Cyber Safety Review Board. In 2023, The Hill reported on Silvers’ leadership in broadening the Abraham Accords to include cybersecurity, so that the governments of the United States, Israel, the United Arab Emirates, Morocco, and Bahrain could work together to defend critical networks. On December 18, 2024, O'keefe Media Group published on Under Secretary Silvers discussing the Biden presidency and its evolution, including widespread reports of his pronounced mental decline while in office. On January 15, 2025, The Circuit published an interview with Silvers in which he described the huge opportunities for collaboration between U.S. tech companies and Gulf region governments and industry in pursuit of advanced artificial intelligence technologies. Silvers was also featured at the 2024 Milken Institute Global Conference for a panel discussion on responsible AI with musician and investor will.i.am.

As of July 2025, he is a partner at Ropes & Gray, where he is co-chair of the firm’s national security practice group and a member of its global data, privacy & cybersecurity practice.

== Personal life ==
A native of New York City, as of April 2021 Silvers lived in Washington, D.C.
