= Kevin McAleenan =

American attorney and government official (born 1971)

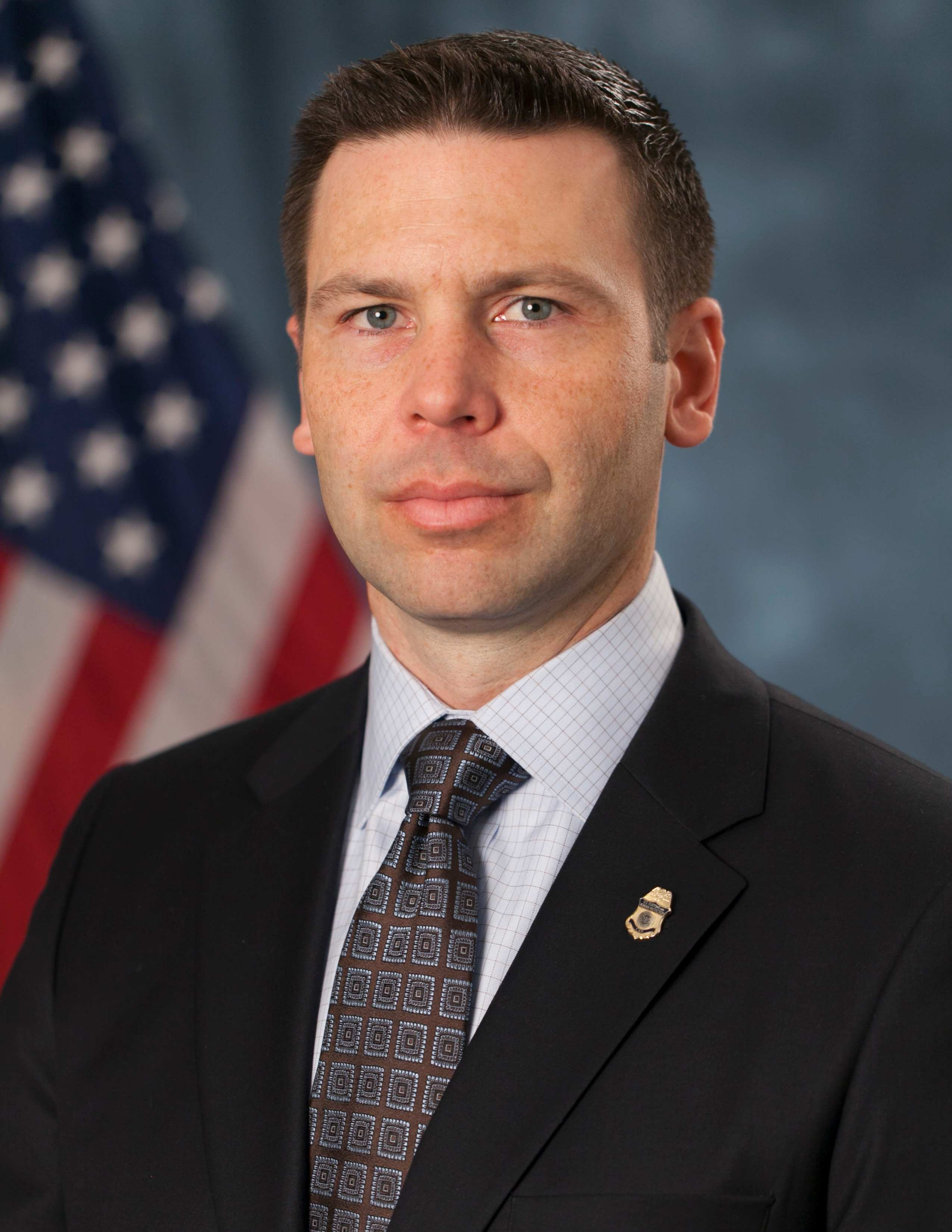

Acting United States Secretary of Homeland Security
- De facto, unlawful
- In office April 11, 2019 – November 13, 2019
- President: Donald Trump
- Deputy: David Pekoske (acting)
- Preceded by: Kirstjen Nielsen
- Succeeded by: Chad Wolf (acting)

Commissioner of United States Customs and Border Protection
- In office March 20, 2018 – April 11, 2019; Acting: January 20, 2017 – March 20, 2018
- President: Donald Trump
- Deputy: Randolph Alles (acting); Ron Vitiello; Robert Perez (acting)
- Preceded by: Gil Kerlikowske
- Succeeded by: Chris Magnus

Personal details
- Born: Kevin Kealoha McAleenan; September 5, 1971 (age 55) Honolulu, Hawaii, U.S.
- Education: Amherst College (BA); University of Chicago Law School (JD)
- Awards: Service to America Award (2005); Presidential Rank Award (2015)

Kevin Kealoha McAleenan (born September 5, 1971) is an American attorney and government official who served as the acting United States secretary of homeland security from April to November 2019.

McAleenan served as the U.S. Customs and Border Protection commissioner from March 2018 to May 2019. During that time, he was a leading proponent of separating children from their parents as a means of deterring illegal entry into the United States. President Donald Trump designated McAleenan as Acting United States Secretary of Homeland Security in April 2019. He resigned on October 11, 2019, with Trump saying McAleenan wanted to "spend more time with his family and go to the private sector". The Government Accountability Office later ruled that McAleenan's appointment as Acting Secretary had been improper.

McAleenan is the CEO and former president of BigBear.ai which holds multiple contracts with the United States Department of Defense.

== Early life ==
Kevin McAleenan was born on September 5, 1971, in Honolulu, Hawaii, to a mother of Finnish descent and a father of Irish descent. He received an undergraduate degree from Amherst College. He then received a J.D. degree from the University of Chicago Law School and practiced law in the state of California, initially at Sheppard, Mullin, Richter & Hampton and subsequently at Gunderson Dettmer.

== Early career ==
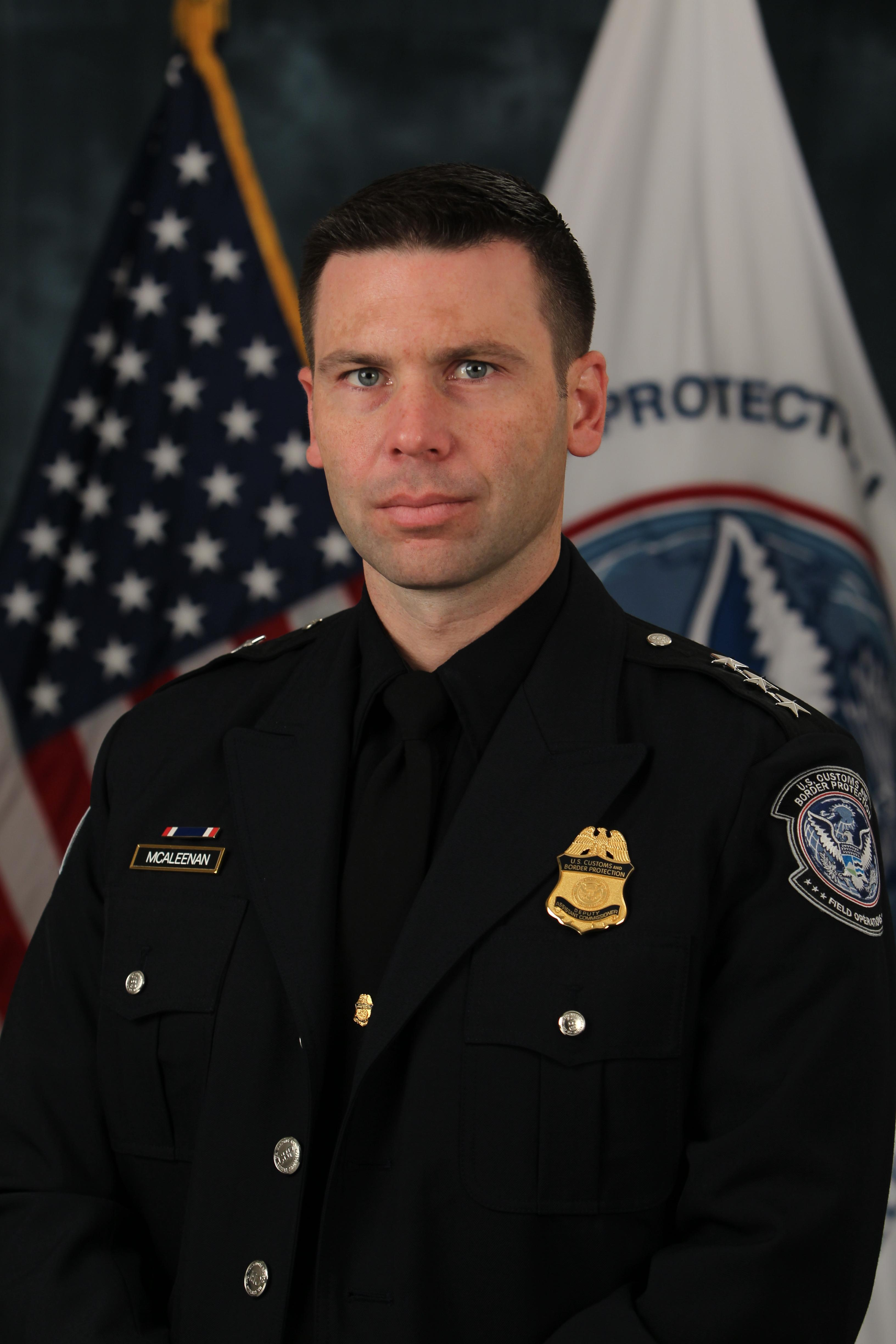
Portrait of Kevin McAleenan as Office of Field Operations Assistant Commissioner

McAleenan practiced law in the private sector from 1998 until 2001, when terrorist attacks that September motivated him to apply to work for the FBI. He was recruited to help start up the new CBP Office of Antiterrorism, eventually becoming its executive director.

In 2006, he became CBP's area director of Los Angeles International Airport (LAX). During his time as the port director of LAX, he was responsible for the security operations for that airport as well as 17 other airport facilities. After two years in private consulting, McAleenan returned to CBP in 2010, leading field operations. In 2011 McAleenan became the assistant commissioner of the Customs and Border Protection, Office of Field Operations. In this position he was in charge of airport operations and responsible for securing the US border while ensuring lawful trade and travel at 329 ports of entry in the United States, as well as 70 locations in more than 40 countries.

McAleenan served as deputy commissioner of Customs and Border Protection from 2014 to 2017.

== Commissioner of U.S. Customs and Border Protection ==
=== Nomination ===
McAleenan served as acting commissioner of U.S. Customs and Border Protection from January 2017 to March 20, 2018.

President Donald Trump nominated McAleenan to assume the position of commissioner in a permanent capacity in May 2017. McAleenan's previous nomination was supported by officials from both the George W. Bush and the Barack Obama administrations, a number of whom signed a letter to Congress expressing "enthusiastic support" for the "supremely qualified" McAleenan. Trump officially submitted the nomination to the Senate on May 22. The Senate confirmed McAleenan's nomination on March 19, 2018, by a vote of 77–19. He was sworn in on March 20, 2018.

=== Tenure ===
McAleenan advocated for the implementation of the Trump administration's "Zero Tolerance" policy on immigration, including the prosecution of parents and the separation of children from their families. According to fifteen of his colleagues, he was one of the most vocal proponents of the policy within the administration. In April 2018, he issued a memorandum calling on Kirstjen Nielsen to begin enacting the policy, in spite of the fact that Nielsen believed that Border Patrol was not prepared to implement it.

In August 2018, McAleenan was interviewed by The New York Times and said he was aware that it is illegal to detain families longer than 90 days. He also said he felt Trump's executive order was an "important recalibration" and that "well-intended efforts are not going to succeed if they lose public interest." McAleenan supports U.S. Immigration and Customs Enforcement, saying it does "critical work." He has said that there is no intent for indefinite or permanent family separation, and acknowledged that the CBP's job is to enforce the law.

In September 2018, McAleenan told the USA Today editorial board he planned to spend more time "analyzing ways to modernize border patrol facilities" and intended to travel to the southwest United States, where most of the migrant children were being held.

On June 11, 2019, McAleenan testified before the Senate Judiciary Committee that the "Zero Tolerance policy lasted six weeks." Subsequently released records from the Department of Health and Human Services (HHS) indicate separations began in February 2018 and continued into March 2019.

On June 28, 2019, McAleenan criticized media reports of conditions for detained migrants at the United States-Mexico border. He claimed that, contrary to reports, detained children had "appropriate meals" and "showers as soon as they can be provided." But a July 2, 2019 Department of Homeland Security Office of Inspector General report found that some detention facilities in Rio Grande Valley had violated CBP standards by not granting children access to showers or hot meals.

== Acting U.S. Secretary of Homeland Security ==
McAleenan being questioned by US Senator Kamala Harris during his March 2019 testimony at the United States Senate.

President Trump designated McAleenan as Acting United States Secretary of Homeland Security on April 8, 2019, following Kirstjen Nielsen's resignation.

McAleenan resigned from the post on October 11, 2019. Trump announced McAleenan's departure on Twitter, saying that McAleenan wanted to "spend more time with his family and go to the private sector." CNN reported that White House officials tried to talk him out of resigning, but McAleenan felt he had accomplished all he could as acting secretary. Trump also announced that he would name McAleenan's successor the following week; his successor, Chad Wolf, was sworn in on November 13, 2019.

At the time, Alan Bersin, a former assistant Homeland Security secretary for international affairs and former Customs and Border Protection Commissioner who had worked closely with McAleenan, opined that he did his job effectively as a professional public servant in three administrations, Republican and Democrat, but his undoing had been the polarizing environment and a lack of White House support.

Ten months later, on August 14, 2020, the Government Accountability Office released a finding that "upon the resignation of Secretary Kirstjen Nielsen, the express terms of the then existing designation required the Director of the Cybersecurity and Infrastructure Security Agency (CISA) to assume that title instead of the Commissioner of Customs and Border Protection (CBP), Kevin McAleenan." The official who should have been Acting Secretary at the time of Nielsen's resignation is Director of the Cybersecurity and Infrastructure Security Agency Christopher C. Krebs. This finding also meant that McAleenan's successor Chad Wolf and his Deputy Acting Secretary Ken Cuccinelli did not appropriately obtain their positions.

== Awards ==
In 2005, McAleenan received the Service to America Medal, Call to Service Award for his leadership and help in developing and implementing a comprehensive anti-terrorism strategy for border security after September 11, 2001. In 2015, McAleenan was awarded the Presidential Rank Award, the highest civil service award in the United States.

== See also ==
- List of Trump administration dismissals and resignations

Political offices
Preceded by Gil Kerlikowske	Commissioner of U.S. Customs and Border Protection; 2017–2019; Acting: 2017–2018	Succeeded by John P. Sanders; Acting
Preceded by Kirstjen Nielsen	United States Secretary of Homeland Security; Acting; 2019	Succeeded by Chad Wolf; Acting
