= WMD Intelligence and Information Sharing Act of 2013 =

- Long title: To amend the Homeland Security Act of 2002 to establish weapons of mass destruction intelligence and information sharing functions of the Office of Intelligence and Analysis of the Department of Homeland Security and to require dissemination of information analyzed by the Department to entities with responsibilities relating to homeland security, and for other purposes.
- Announced in: the 113th United States Congress
- Sponsored by: Rep. Patrick Meehan (R, PA-7)
- Number of co-sponsors: 4

Codification
- Acts affected: Homeland Security Act of 2002, National Security Act of 1947
- U.S.C. sections affected: 6 U.S.C. § 121 et seq., 50 U.S.C. § 401a(4), 6 U.S.C. § 121(d)(8),
- Agencies affected: United States Senate, United States House of Representatives, Department of Homeland Security

Legislative history
- Introduced in the House as H.R. 1542 by Rep. Patrick Meehan (R, PA-7) on April 12, 2013; Committee consideration by United States House Committee on Homeland Security, United States House Homeland Security Subcommittee on Counterterrorism and Intelligence, United States Senate Committee on Homeland Security and Governmental Affairs; Passed the House on July 22, 2013 (Roll Call Vote 375: 388-3)

The WMD Intelligence and Information Sharing Act of 2013 (H.R. 1542) is a bill that would "amend the Homeland Security Act of 2002 to establish weapons of mass destruction intelligence and information sharing functions of the Office of Intelligence and Analysis of the Department of Homeland Security and to require dissemination of information analyzed by the Department to entities with responsibilities relating to homeland security." This intelligence gathering would include not only chemical, biological, radiological, and nuclear threats, but also the analysis of potential threats to public health or U.S. agriculture. The bill passed the United States House of Representatives during the 113th United States Congress and was referred to the United States Senate.

== Provisions of the bill ==
This summary is based largely on the summary provided by the Congressional Research Service, a public domain source.

The WMD Intelligence and Information Sharing Act of 2013 would amend the Homeland Security Act of 2002 to direct the Office of Intelligence and Analysis of the Department of Homeland Security (DHS) to: (1) support homeland security-focused intelligence analysis of terrorist actors, their claims, and their plans to conduct attacks involving chemical, biological, radiological, and nuclear materials against the nation and of global infectious disease, public health, food, agricultural, and veterinary issues; (2) support homeland security-focused risk analysis and risk assessments of such homeland security hazards by providing relevant quantitative and nonquantitative threat information; (3) leverage homeland security intelligence capabilities and structures to enhance prevention, protection, response, and recovery efforts with respect to a chemical, biological, radiological, or nuclear attack; and (4) share information and provide tailored analytical support on these threats to state, local, and tribal authorities as well as other national biosecurity and biodefense stakeholders.

The bill would also require the Office of Intelligence and Analysis to coordinate with other DHS components, the Intelligence Community, and federal, state, local, and tribal authorities where appropriate and enable such entities to provide recommendations on optimal information sharing mechanisms and on how they can provide information to DHS. It also would direct the Secretary of DHS to report annually on: (1) intelligence and information sharing activities to counter the threat from weapons of mass destruction, and (2) DHS's activities in accordance with relevant intelligence strategies. Finally, it would require the Secretary to ensure that homeland security information analyzed by DHS concerning terrorist threats is provided to state, local, and private entities and the public.

== Procedural history ==
=== House ===
The WMD Intelligence and Information Sharing Act of 2013 was introduced on April 12, 2013 by Rep. Patrick Meehan (R, PA-7). It was referred to the United States House Committee on Homeland Security and the United States House Homeland Security Subcommittee on Counterterrorism and Intelligence. On Friday, July 19, 2013, House Majority Leader Eric Cantor announced that H.R. 1542 would be on the schedule for Monday, July 22, 2013. On July 22, 2013, the bill passed the House in Roll Call Vote 375: 388-3.

=== Senate ===
The WMD Intelligence and Information Sharing Act of 2013 was received in the Senate on July 23, 2013 and referred to the United States Senate Committee on Homeland Security and Governmental Affairs.

== Debate and discussion ==
Speaking in favor of the bill Rep Meehan said that "the legislation provides important guidance for disseminating WMD... intelligence information at the Department of Homeland Security." He also argued that this bill was necessary in light of the Boston Marathon bombings, saying that "the potential for home-grown radicalization has increased the need for law enforcement and federal authorities to work together. The attack on Boston this Spring proved this."

== See also ==
- List of bills in the 113th United States Congress
- Homeland Security Act of 2002
- DHS Office of Intelligence and Analysis
- CBRN defense
- United States Intelligence Community
