= Title VI =

Title 6 or Title VI in Roman numerals, refers to the sixth part of various laws, including:

- Title VI of the Civil Rights Act of 1964
- Title 6 of the United States Code
- Title VI, Part A, § 602 of the Higher Education Act of 1965 (National Resource Center Program of the U.S. Department of Education)
- Title VI of the Patriot Act
- Title 6 of the Code of Federal Regulations
