= David Glawe =

American government official (born 1970)

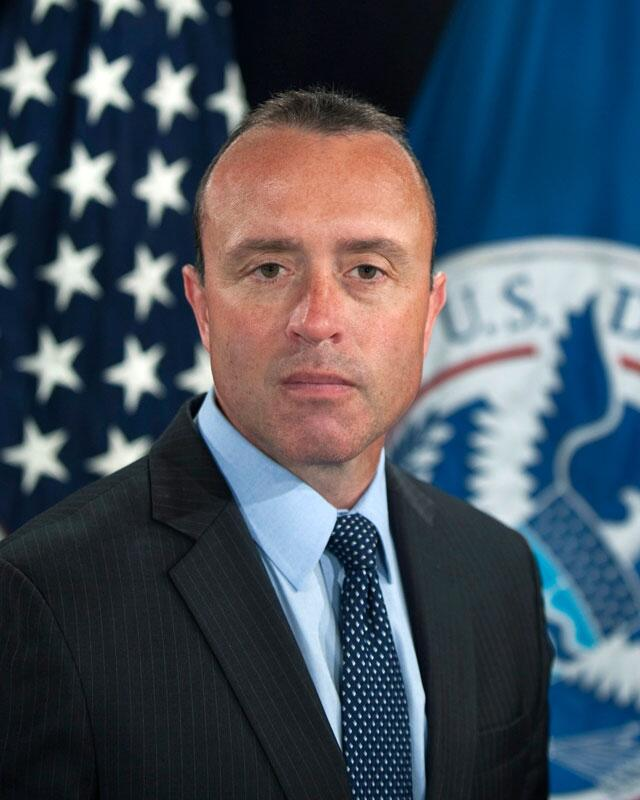

Under Secretary of Homeland Security for Intelligence and Analysis
- In office August 8, 2017 – May 9, 2020
- President: Donald Trump
- Preceded by: Francis X. Taylor
- Succeeded by: Kenneth L. Wainstein

Personal details
- Born: David James Glawe; January 13, 1970 (age 56) Davenport, Iowa, U.S.
- Education: University of Northern Iowa (BA)

David James Glawe (born January 13, 1970) was the Under Secretary of Homeland Security for Intelligence and Analysis from January 2017 to May 2020 and is currently the president and CEO of the National Insurance Crime Bureau.

== Career ==
Glawe was born in 1970, and grew up in Davenport, Iowa. He graduated in 1992 from the University of Northern Iowa with a B.A. in Behavioral Science in criminology and certificate from the Harvard University in 2015.

Glawe started his law enforcement career as a police officer with the Houston, Texas and Aurora, Colorado Police Departments. He served as a federal agent with the United States Postal Inspection Service and then as a counter-terrorism special agent with the Federal Bureau of Investigation. In 2007, as an FBI Supervisory Special Agent in the Counterterrorism Division, he served in Iraq and Africa.

In 2012 he became Deputy National Intelligence Manager for Threat Finance and Transnational Organized Crime at the Office of the Director of National Intelligence. In 2015 he was appointed to serve as the Assistant Commissioner and Chief Intelligence Officer at United States Customs and Border Protection.

He was appointed as the acting Under Secretary of Homeland Security for Intelligence and Analysis by President Trump on January 23, 2017, and was unanimously confirmed to that position on a permanent basis by the United States Senate on August 3, 2017. He also served briefly in the White House as Special Assistant to the President for Homeland Security. He was the longest serving Senate-confirmed official in DHS.

As the Chief Intelligence Officer and Under Secretary he oversees the intelligence capabilities for an organization of approximately 250,000 personnel. He is charged with the strategic and programmatic oversight to integrate the intelligence capabilities from 22 DHS component organizations such as the United States Coast Guard, US Customs and Border Protection, US Secret Service, FEMA, Transportation Security Administration and the newly created Cyber Security and Infrastructure Security Agency. He is also the senior U.S. Government official statutorily charged to deliver the technical and programmatic infrastructure to drive the bi-directional dissemination of intelligence and information sharing with: state, local and private sector partners through the DHS Mission Centers.

On June 1, 2020, David Glawe became the president and CEO of the National Insurance Crime Bureau.

== Personal life ==
When Glawe was confirmed he was the highest ranking openly gay LGBTQ2SA+ U.S. Government Official, the first LGBTQ2SA+ individual to be nominated by a Republican President, was supported and introduced at his confirmation hearing by the most senior Republican Senator from Iowa, Chuck Grassley, and is the first LGBTQ official to lead a U.S. intelligence organization.

He currently resides with his husband and two children in the Washington D.C. metro area.

Government offices
Preceded by Francis X. Taylor	Under Secretary of Homeland Security for Intelligence and Analysis; August 8, 2017 – May 10, 2020	Succeeded by Brian Murphy
