= Charles E. Allen =

American public servant

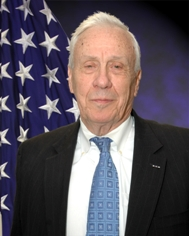
- Charles E. Allen in 2005

Under Secretary of Homeland Security for Intelligence and Analysis
- In office August 23, 2005 – January 20, 2009
- President: George W. Bush
- Preceded by: Patrick M. Hughes
- Succeeded by: Caryn Wagner

Personal details
- Born: 1936 (age 89–90) Taylorsville, North Carolina, U.S.
- Education: University of North Carolina; U.S. Air Force Air War College
- Website: DHS Charles E. Allen

Charles E. Allen (born 1936) is an American public servant, notable for his roles at the United States Department of Homeland Security's Office of Intelligence and Analysis and, before that, the Central Intelligence Agency.

== Department of Homeland Security ==
In August 2005, President George W. Bush appointed Charles E. Allen, to the dual role of Assistant Secretary for Information Analysis at the Department of Homeland Security as well as the DHS Chief of Intelligence. Effective November 2007, Charles Allen's position was elevated to Under Secretary for the renamed Office of Intelligence and Analysis at DHS, an office he held until January 20, 2009. Prior to his appointment to DHS, Allen served as Special Assistant to the Director of the Central Intelligence Agency.

Anwar al-Awlaki

In October 2008, Allen warned that Anwar al-Awlaki "targets US Muslims with radical online lectures encouraging terrorist attacks from his new home in Yemen." Quoting Allen, Al-Awlaki responded in December 2008: "I would challenge him to come up with just one such lecture where I encourage 'terrorist attacks'". The FBI later investigated (but dismissed) al-Awlaki's connections to both the November 5, 2009 Fort Hood shooting sole suspect, Nidal Hasan, as well as to the Northwest Flight 253 bombing attempt in which he is believed to have played a part in the al-Qaeda operation, and trained and blessed the suspect.

== Career highlights Central Intelligence Agency ==
- Served with the CIA since 1958, holding a variety of positions of increasing responsibility, both analytic and managerial.
- Analyzed intelligence from the Berlin Tunnel operation.
- Served as an analyst tracking the names of Soviet missile technicians in Cuba, 1962.
- CIA's national intelligence officer for counterterrorism (1985)
- Director of the National Security Council's Hostage Location Task Force (1985)
- National Intelligence Officer for Warning (1986)
- Served as Assistant Director of Central Intelligence [ADCI] for Collection, June 1998 until June 2005. In that capacity, he was in charge of coordinating all the community spy systems and chaired the National Intelligence Collection Board, which ensures that collection is integrated and coordinated across the intelligence community.

"Appointed as Assistant Director of Central Intelligence (ADCI) for Collection, coordinating the entire intelligence community intelligence collection system, was Charles Allen, a thirty year veteran operations officer. He will oversee the decisions of the various committees deciding the targets of national systems. He allegedly was chosen on the basis of his reputation for holding contrariness views and willingness to challenge the system."

== C.I.A. Inspector General's report on 9/11 intelligence failures ==
In August 2005 the New York Times reported that supporters of former C.I.A. Director George Tenet were critical of the CIA Inspector General's report on the intelligences failures ahead of the September 11 terrorist attacks for having failed to interview Allen, who was assistant director of central intelligence for collection.

In 1998, after the bombing of two American embassies in East Africa, Mr. Allen was assigned by George Tenet to organize the agency's efforts against the terrorist network, according to testimony Mr. Tenet gave last year. He said that at the advice of Mr. Allen, he created a special unit with officers from the C.I.A., the National Security Agency and the NGA to meet daily and focus on Al Qaeda in Afghanistan.

== Comments about Charles Allen ==
Mark Perry offers this commentary about Allen based on information from colleagues:

- "An eccentric workaholic who often picked fights with superiors"
- "A tall graying man given to sober suits and precise grammar."
- "More than just a little weird; it was hard to know just where he was coming from."
- "At times during his career Allen seemed almost out of control as he often spent all night at his office and made unreasonable demands on his secretarial staff."
- "Allen was known for his offbeat views, and his detractors said he had a huge ego."
- "A 'brilliant man' with 'a yen for controversy'"

From an August 2004 U.S. News & World Report article:

"…more of a legend than a man around the CIA. 'If you don't think you're getting your money's worth out of the federal government,' says an admirer, 'you should meet Charlie Allen.' A workaholic, Allen had served as an intelligence officer for 40 years and earned a reputation as a plain-spoken professional who regularly bucked the bureaucracy…"

Duane Clarridge remarked in his memoir:

"He (Allen) was a bit of a maverick; bright absolutely dedicated, on occasion short on diplomacy, and a workaholic."

== Continuity of government ==
From 1980 to November 1982, Allen was detailed to the Office of the Secretary of Defense, where he was deputy director of a continuity of government planning project. A colleague quoted Allen as saying during a COG meeting, "our job is to throw the Constitution out the window." His assignment to the COG project brought him into contact with Oliver North, who was delegated to monitor COG's findings by National Security Adviser Robert McFarlane.

== Iran Contra ==
- From the nomination of Robert M. Gates of Virginia, to be Director of Central Intelligence (Senate: November 5, 1991), Congressional Record: Extract:

"On September 9, 1986, a senior CIA analyst, Charles Allen, wrote a memo on the arms sales to Iran, a copy of which went to Mr. Gates. He also claims to have talked to Mr. Gates regarding shipments of arms to Iran. Mr. Gates cannot recall the conversation or receiving the Nomination memo." Re Iran-Contra scandal.

- "A number of outspoken analysts bitterly criticized him [Allen] for bending his views to political expediency during the Iran initiative. Allen, they said, took advantage of his access to Casey to promote a political line – that an opening could be made to Iranian moderates-that could not be supported by the information they had gathered on Iran's internal politics. Allen played the White House game, these critics claimed, by using contrived information provided by CIA consultant George Cave to support the Iran program. 'Charlie Allen briefed the NSC on the basis of Cave's disinformation,' a senior CIA analyst explains."

== Reprimand by William Webster ==
Director of Central Intelligence William Webster formally reprimanded Allen for failing to fully comply with the DCI's request for full cooperation in the agency's internal Iran-Contra scandal investigation. After failing to have the reprimand lifted through the regular appeal process, Allen retained future DCI James Woolsey as an attorney and was successful in applying pressure to have the reprimand lifted.

Mark Perry observes "Ironically, Allen's attack on Webster was as unjustified as Webster's reprimand." The reprimand stemmed from a set of missing papers found in Allen's office containing information on the arms-for-hostages deal. Allen claimed they had been inadvertently overlooked in a messy office. Supporters of Allen pointed out that Webster reprimanded the one person in the CIA who had brought his suspicions of a funds diversion to Robert Gates. Others asserted that Allen simply did not respect Webster.

== Gulf War: warning of war ==
- Richard L. Russell, Political Science Quarterly, Summer 2002:

"One high-level intelligence official on the National Intelligence Council (NIC), charged with advising the DCI, was more forward leaning than the analytic judgments published in the NID. The National Intelligence Officer (NIO) for Warning Charles Allen on July 25 [1990] issued a 'warning of war' memorandum in which he stressed that Iraq had nearly achieved the capability to launch a corps-sized operation of sufficient mass to occupy much of Kuwait. The memo judged that the chances of a military operation of some sort at better than 60 percent."

== Gulf War: bombing of Amiriyah shelter ==
Allen supported the selection of bomb targets during the first Gulf War. He coordinated intelligence with Colonel John Warden, who headed the Air Force's planning cell known as "Checkmate." On February 10, 1991, Allen presented his estimate to Col. Warden that Public Shelter Number 25 in the Southwestern Baghdad suburb of Amiriyah had become an alternative command post and showed no sign of being used as a civilian bomb shelter.

Satellite photos and electronic intercepts indicating this alternative use were regarded as circumstantial and unconvincing to Brigadier General Buster Glosson, who had primary responsibility for targeting. Glosson's comment was that the assessment wasn't "worth a shit." A human source in Iraq, who had previously proven accurate warned the CIA that Iraqi intelligence had begun operating from the shelter. On February 11, the Amiriyah shelter was added to the Air Force's attack plan. At 4:30 am the morning of February 13, two F-117 stealth bombers each dropped a 2,000 pound, laser-guided, GBU-27 munition on the shelter. The first cut through ten feet of reinforced concrete before a time-delayed fuze exploded. Minutes later the second bomb followed the path cut by the first bomb.

In the shelter at the time of the bombing were hundreds of Iraqi civilians. More than 400 people, mostly women and children were killed. Men and boys over the age of 15 had left the shelter to give the women and children some privacy. Jeremy Bowen, a BBC correspondent, was one of the first television reporters on the scene. Bowen was given access to the site and did not find evidence of military use.

== Australia ==
From 1974 to 1977, he was stationed in Canberra, Australia, in an intelligence liaison capacity. Served under CIA Station Chiefs M. Corely Wonus (1934–1992) and John Walker (1921–2002).|

== National Security Space Association ==
As of 2024, Allen serves on the advisory board of the National Security Space Association.

Government offices
Preceded by Assistant Secretary of Homeland Security for Intelligence and Analysis	Under Secretary of Homeland Security for Intelligence and Analysis; August 3, 2007 - January 20, 2009	Succeeded by Francis X. Taylor
