= Under Secretary of Homeland Security for Intelligence and Analysis =

Senior official in the U.S. Department of Homeland Security

United States Under Secretary of Homeland Security for Intelligence and Analysis of Office of Intelligence and Analysis

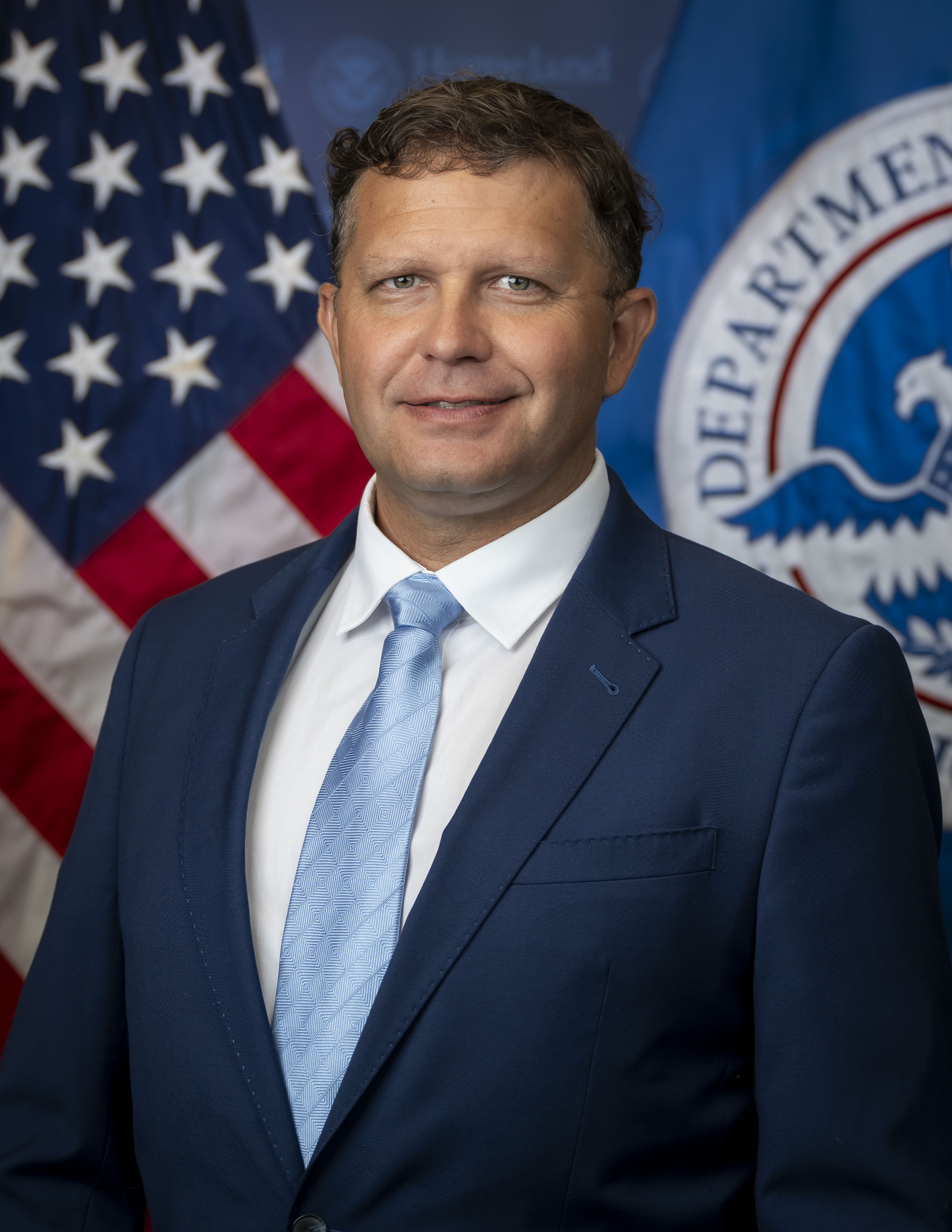
- Incumbent; Matthew Kozma since October 27, 2025
- United States Department of Homeland Security
- Formation: 2007
- Website: Official website

The under secretary of homeland security for intelligence and analysis is a high-level civilian official in the United States Department of Homeland Security (DHS). The under secretary, as head of the Office of Intelligence and Analysis at DHS, is the principal staff assistant and adviser to the secretary of homeland security and the deputy secretary of homeland security for fusing law enforcement and intelligence information relating to terrorism and other critical threats.

The under secretary for intelligence and analysis is appointed by the president of the United States with the consent of the United States Senate to serve at the pleasure of the president.

== Overview ==
The under secretary of homeland security for intelligence and analysis is the chief intelligence officer for the United States Department of Homeland Security (DHS). Representing DHS within the United States Intelligence Community, the under secretary participates in inter-agency counter-terrorism efforts and is responsible for ensuring that state and local law enforcement officials receive information on critical threats from national-level intelligence agencies.

When the position was created by the Homeland Security Act of 2002 along with DHS, the position was originally known as the Assistant Secretary of Homeland Security for Information Analysis. At that time, the position was within the DHS Information Analysis and Infrastructure Protection Directorate. Following a 2005 reorganization of DHS, the position was made independent, appointed DHS Chief Intelligence Officer, and renamed Assistant Secretary of Homeland Security for Intelligence and Analysis. The Implementing Recommendations of the 9/11 Commission Act of 2007 (Public Law 110-53) was enacted on August 7, 2007 and reorganized intelligence operations at DHS, elevating the assistant secretary to the under secretary level.

With the rank of Under Secretary, the under secretary for intelligence and analysis is a Level III position within the Executive Schedule. Since January 2022, the annual rate of pay for Level III is $187,300.

== Reporting officials ==
As head of the DHS Office of Intelligence and Analysis, officials reporting to the under secretary include:

- Principal Deputy Under Secretary of Intelligence and Analysis
  - Deputy Under Secretary for Intelligence Enterprise Operations
  - Deputy Under Secretary for Intelligence Enterprise Readiness

== Officeholders ==
Under Secretaries of Homeland Security for Intelligence and Analysis
| Portrait | Name | Date appointed | Tenure | Secretary served under | President served under |
|---|---|---|---|---|---|
Assistant Secretary of Homeland Security for Information Analysis
| | Paul Redmond | March 18, 2003 | July 30, 2004 | Tom Ridge | George W. Bush |
| | William Parrish | August 13, 2004 | January 29, 2005 | Tom Ridge | George W. Bush |
| | Lt. Gen. Patrick M. Hughes, U.S. Army | January 30, 2005 | March 15, 2005 | Michael Chertoff | George W. Bush |
Assistant Secretary of Homeland Security for Intelligence and Analysis
| | Charles E. Allen | August 23, 2005 | August 3, 2007 | Michael Chertoff | George W. Bush |
Under Secretary of Homeland Security for Intelligence and Analysis
| | Charles E. Allen | August 3, 2007 | January 20, 2009 | Michael Chertoff | George W. Bush |
| | Bart R. Johnson | May 19, 2009 | February 11, 2010 | Janet Napolitano | Barack Obama |
| | Caryn Wagner | February 11, 2010 | December 21, 2012 | Janet Napolitano | Barack Obama |
| | William E. Tarry Jr. | December 21, 2012 | November 2013 | Janet Napolitano Rand Beers | Barack Obama |
| | Francis X. Taylor | April 14, 2014 | January 20, 2017 | Jeh Johnson | Barack Obama |
| | David J. Glawe | January 23, 2017 | March 2017 | John F. Kelly | Donald Trump |
| | Patricia Cogswell | March 2017 | August 8, 2017 | John F. Kelly | Donald Trump |
| | David J. Glawe | August 8, 2017 | May 9, 2020 | Elaine C. Duke (Acting) Kirstjen Nielsen Kevin McAleenan (Acting) Chad Wolf (Acting) | Donald Trump |
| | Brian Murphy | May 10, 2020 | August 2, 2020 | Chad Wolf (Acting) | Donald Trump |
| | Joseph B. Maher | August 3, 2020 | January 20, 2021 | Chad Wolf (Acting) Pete Gaynor (Acting) | Donald Trump |
| | Melissa Smislova | January 20, 2021 | July 9, 2021 | David Pekoske (Acting); Alejandro Mayorkas | Joe Biden |
| | John D. Cohen | July 9, 2021 | April 8, 2022 | Alejandro Mayorkas | Joe Biden |
| | Melissa Smislova | April 9, 2022 | June 13, 2022 | Alejandro Mayorkas | Joe Biden |
| | Kenneth L. Wainstein | June 13, 2022 | January 20, 2025 | Alejandro Mayorkas | Joe Biden |
| | Avery Alpha | January 20, 2025 | February 26, 2025 | Benjamine Huffman (Acting); Kristi Noem | Donald Trump |
| | Daniel J. Tamburello | February 26, 2025 | October 27, 2025 | Kristi Noem | Donald Trump |
| | Matthew Kozma | October 27, 2025 | Incumbent | Kristi Noem; Markwayne Mullin | Donald Trump |

Denotes Acting or Senior Official Performing the Duties of Under Secretary
