= Caryn Wagner =

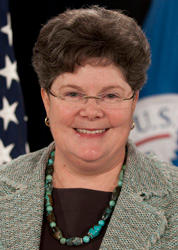
- Wagner in 2010

Under Secretary of Homeland Security for Intelligence and Analysis
- In office February 11, 2010 – December 21, 2012
- President: Barack Obama
- Deputy: William E. Tarry, Jr.
- Preceded by: Charles E. Allen
- Succeeded by: Francis X. Taylor

Personal details
- Born: September 22, 1957 (age 69) Columbus, Georgia, U.S.
- Education: College of William & Mary; University of Southern California

Military service
- Allegiance: United States
- Branch/service: United States Army

Caryn Wagner was the Department of Homeland Security’s Under Secretary of Homeland Security for Intelligence and Analysis from February 11, 2010, to December 21, 2012. As such, she was DHS's Chief Intelligence Officer (CINT), in charge of the DHS Office of Intelligence and Analysis with responsibilities over the DHS component intelligence services. She was the first woman to serve in this position, after extensive experience in the U.S. Intelligence Community and on Capitol Hill.

== Birth and Education ==
Wagner was born September 22, 1957, in Columbus, Georgia. She graduated from the College of William and Mary in 1979 with a Bachelor of Arts degree in English and History, and received a Master of Science degree in Systems Management from the University of Southern California in 1987.

== Intelligence Community Experience ==
Wagner served for eight years (1979-1987) as a signals intelligence and electronic warfare officer in the U.S. Army, leaving active duty in 1987 with the rank of Captain. From February 1988 to May 1990, she worked as an Army intelligence research specialist.

After three years at the consulting firm of Booz Allen Hamilton, where she worked on tactical exploitation of national capabilities, support to military operations, intelligence planning, and intelligence systems architecture development, she became a professional staff member of the House Permanent Select Committee on Intelligence (HPSCI). She was Staff Director of the Subcommittee on Technical and Tactical Intelligence in 1995–1996.

From November 1996 to November 2000, Wagner was director of the Military Intelligence Staff at the Pentagon for the Defense Intelligence Agency. From November 2000 to April 2003, she was DIA's Deputy Director for Analysis and Production, then DIA senior representative and liaison to the United States European Command.

From May 2004 to April 2005 she was the executive director for Intelligence Community affairs at the Central Intelligence Agency, then Assistant Deputy Director of National Intelligence for Management and the first Chief Financial Officer for the National Intelligence Program at the Office of the Director of National Intelligence until January 2007.

Wagner returned to Capitol Hill from January 2007 to October 2008 as budget director and cyber security coordinator for HPSCI. She was an instructor from October 2008 to October 2009 in Intelligence Community management for a private company that trains members of government agencies and private security firms.

== Under Secretary of Homeland Security ==
On October 26, 2009, President Barack Obama announced his intent to nominate Wagner as Under Secretary for Homeland Security. As is customary for Under Secretaries of Homeland Security for intelligence, she had two confirmation hearings, the first before the Senate Select Committee on Intelligence on December 1, 2009, and the second before the Senate Committee on Homeland Security and Governmental Affairs on December 3, 2009. She was confirmed by the Senate on February 11, 2010.

Wagner testified before Congress many times in threat hearings (sometimes closed to the public) and about DHS intelligence-related management issues. Examples include:

- DHS Intelligence Enterprise: Still Just a Vision or Reality?, Subcommittee on Intelligence, Information Sharing, and Terrorism Risk Assessment of the Committee on Homeland Security House of Representatives, May 12, 2010.
- DHS Intelligence Enterprise: Past, Present, and Future, Subcommittee on Counterterrorism and Intelligence of the Committee on Homeland Security, House of Representatives, June 1, 2011.
- Is the Office of Intelligence and Analysis Adequately Connected to the Broader Homeland Communities?, Subcommittee on Intelligence, Information Sharing, and Terrorism Risk Assessment of the Committee on Homeland Security, House of Representatives, September 29, 2010.
- Full Committee World Wide Threats Hearing, House of Representatives Permanent Select Committee on Intelligence, February 10, 2011.
- Jihadist Use of Social Media--How to Prevent Terrorism and Preserve Innovation, Subcommittee on Counterterrorism and Intelligence of the Committee on Homeland Security, House of Representatives, December 6, 2011.
- Current and Projected National Security Threats to the United States, Select Committee on Intelligence of the United States Senate, January 31, 2012.

Wagner resigned from DHS effective December 21, 2012. Deputy Under Secretary Bill Tarry succeeded her as Acting Under Secretary. A permanent successor was not named until Francis X. Taylor was nominated on February 12, 2014.

== Post-DHS Career ==
Since January 2015, Wagner has been an Adjunct Faculty Member at the National Intelligence University, teaching courses in leadership and management, Intelligence Community policy and oversight, and financial management of intelligence resources. Wagner serves on the board of directors of the National Intelligence University Foundation.

Wagner serves on the board or as an advisor to a number of charitable and private organizations.

Government offices
Preceded by Bart R. Johnson	Under Secretary of Homeland Security for Intelligence and Analysis; February 11, 2010 - December 21, 2012	Succeeded by William E. Tarry, Jr.
