= Patrick M. Hughes =

United States Army general

Patrick Hughes
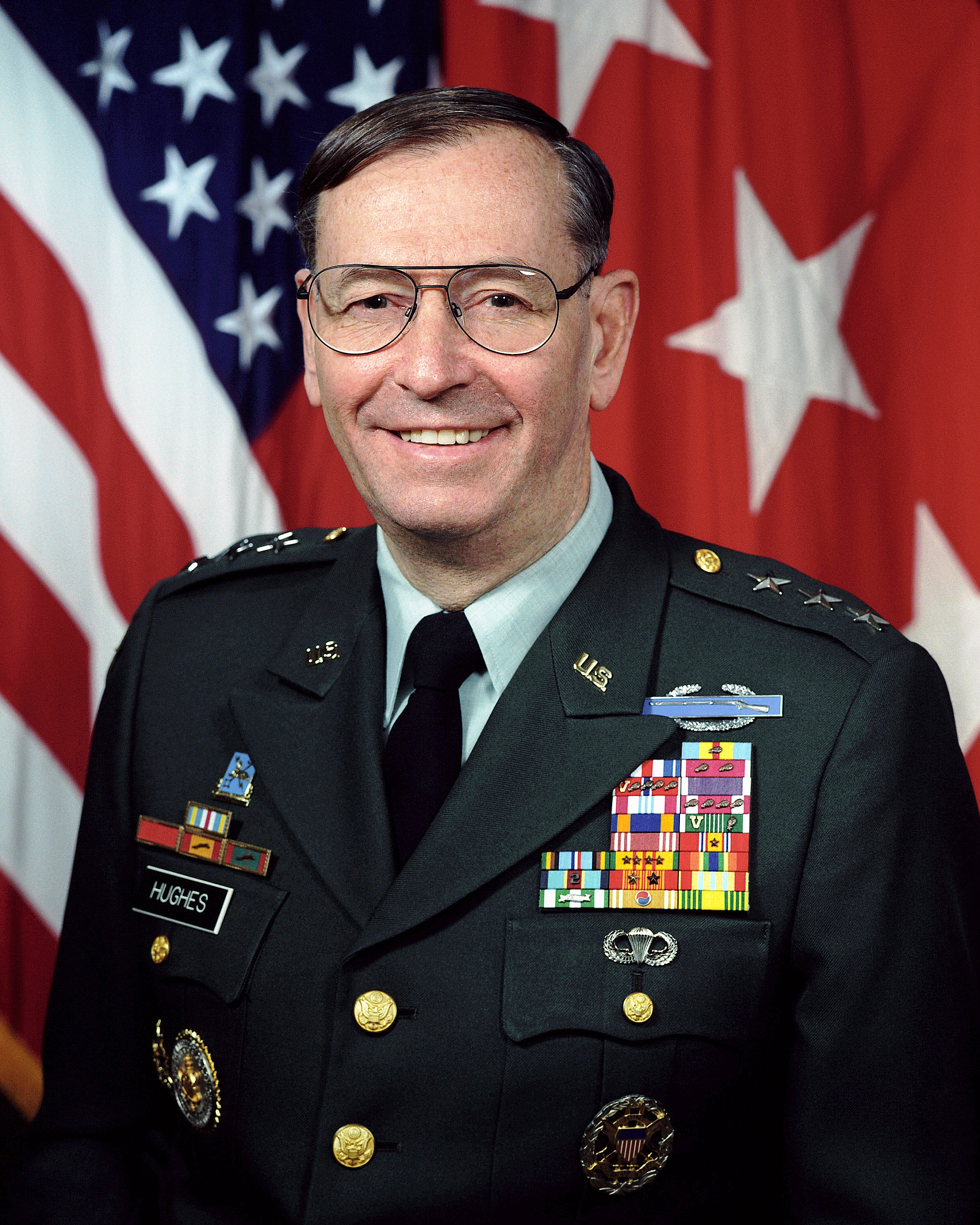

Director of the Defense Intelligence Agency
- In office February 16, 1996 – July 27, 1999
- President: Bill Clinton
- Preceded by: Kenneth Minihan
- Succeeded by: Thomas Wilson

Personal details
- Born: Patrick Marshall Hughes; September 19, 1942 Great Falls, Montana, U.S.
- Died: October 5, 2024 (aged 82)
- Resting place: Arlington National Cemetery
- Education: Montana State University, Bozeman; Brigham Young University, Utah; Central Michigan University; United States Army Command and General Staff College
- Awards: Defense Distinguished Service Medal (3); Silver Star (1); Bronze Star for Valor (3); Purple Heart; National Intelligence Distinguished Service Medal (2 awards)

Military service
- Allegiance: United States
- Branch/service: United States Army
- Years of service: 1962–1965; 1968–1999
- Rank: Lieutenant General
- Commands: Director, Defense Intelligence Agency; Commanding General, U.S. Army Intelligence Agency; Commander, 501st Military Intelligence Brigade; Commander, 109th MI Battalion (High Technology Test Bed)

Patrick M. Hughes (September 19, 1942 – October 5, 2024) was a United States Army officer who served as the 12th Director of the Defense Intelligence Agency (DIA). Previously, he was Director of Intelligence for the US Joint Chiefs of Staff from 1994 to 1996 and the Director of Intelligence at United States Central Command from 1992 to 1994. He was the Commanding General, United States Army Intelligence Agency, and the Assistant Deputy Chief of Staff for Intelligence, U.S. Army from 1990 until 1992. He joined the United States Department of Homeland Security in 2003 as the Assistant Secretary for Information Analysis (Intelligence), and departed from DHS and Government service in March 2005.

== Early life and education ==
Hughes was born on September 19, 1942, in Great Falls, Montana, but shortly after birth his family moved to the small town of Manhattan, Montana, in the Gallatin Valley near Bozeman where he was raised and schooled. During his formative years Hughes was active in sports and school activities and held a variety of jobs from a young age. He often spent summers in Riverton, Wyoming, and Jackson Hole, Wyoming, where his Father worked and lived. He graduated from Manhattan High School in 1960.

He attended Montana State College (later designated a university) and Brigham Young University in Provo, Utah before joining the U.S. Army on January 2, 1962. Following his initial enlistment Hughes returned to Montana State University in January 1965 to pursue a college education and degree. Hughes was commissioned through the Army ROTC Program at Montana State University, Bozeman, Montana, in June 1968, where he earned a Bachelor of Science degree in business. He earned a Master of Arts in Business Management from Central Michigan University concurrent with his graduation from the U.S. Army Command and General Staff College in 1978. Hughes attended the School of Advanced Military Studies (SAMS) in 1986 as an Advanced Operational Studies Fellow (AOSF) in lieu of attendance at the War College. He received Honorary doctorates from Montana State University (Business) and the National Defense Intelligence College (Military Intelligence) in 1999. His military education and training includes the Infantry Officer Basic Course (IOBC-RA2) at Fort Benning, Georgia, the Military Assistance Training Advisor Course (MATA) at Fort Bragg, the Counterintelligence Research Officer Course (9666) at Fort Holabird, Maryland, the Military Assistance Security Adviser (MASA) Course at Fort Bragg, and the United States Army Intelligence Center Training Military Intelligence Officers Advanced Course at Fort Huachuca.

He also completed Army Basic Training, Army Medical Corpsman training, Single Engine Pilot training, Basic Airborne School, Jumpmaster training, the Jungle Warfare School Operations Course, and was trained in the Vietnamese language in conjunction with his MATA and MASA training at the John F. Kennedy Special Warfare Center and School, Fort Bragg, and later the Korean language at the Defense Language Institute, Monterey, California. He also completed the Electronic Warfare / Cryptology Officer Familiarization Course, the Advanced Military Studies Program (War College-level Fellowship), the Brigade-level Pre-Command Course, the Senior Officer Legal Course, and General Office CAPSTONE training.

== Career ==
=== Education ===
Hughes enlisted in the U.S. Army on January 2, 1962, and subsequently was trained as a Medical Specialist (911B20), rising to the rank of Specialist 5 (E-5). He was assigned to the 5th Medical Battalion, 5th Infantry Division (Mechanized) and the 249th Helicopter Ambulance Company (H-21), a United States Strike Command unit, at Fort Carson, Colorado. During his 3-year enlistment he participated in large-scale military exercises "We Will," "Swift Strike II", "Swift Strike III," "Desert Strike," "Coulee Crest," and "Gold Fire I." Following the completion of his enlistment in 1965, he attended Montana State University and subsequently was commissioned as a Regular Army (United States) (RA) officer in the U.S. Army Infantry. During this period he was selected as a Distinguished Military Student (DMS) and Distinguished Military Graduate (DMG). Hughes remained in the U.S. Army Reserve during most of his time at Montana State. He completed his bachelor's degree work in June 1968 and following commissioning he reported to Fort Bragg, North Carolina for duty with the 2nd Battalion, 504th Parachute Infantry Regiment (Devils in Baggy Pants), 82nd Airborne Division, as a platoon leader in Company B and later as Battalion S-1. During this period he served as a "security cordon" officer in Washington, D.C., during the first inauguration of President Richard Nixon on January 20, 1969, during a time of some turmoil in the United States (Nixon inauguration).

=== Vietnam War ===
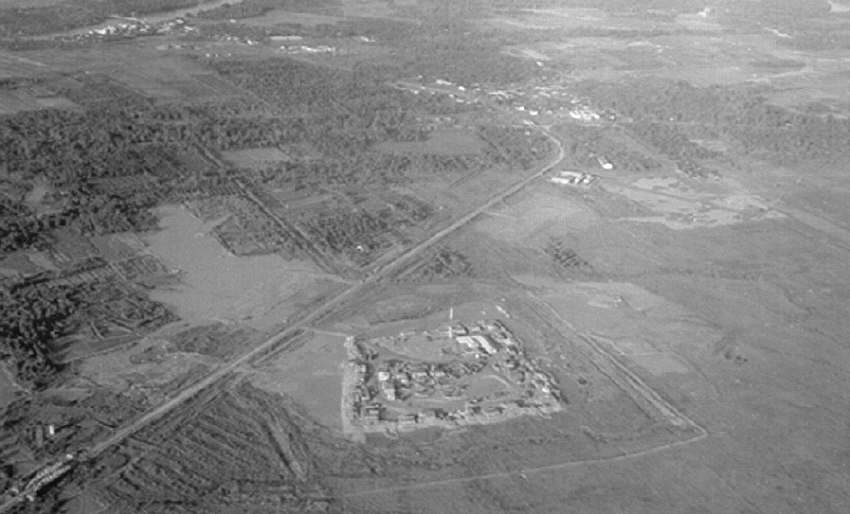
Fire Support Base Danger, March 1969

In March 1969, he began his first tour in South Vietnam as a platoon leader in Company D, 4th Battalion, 39th Infantry, 9th Infantry Division, South Vietnam at Fire Support Base Danger in the Mekong Delta region. In September of that year he was withdrawn from combat along with his unit, the 4th Bn, 39th Infantry and reassigned to Schofield Barracks, Hawaii, and after a brief stay at Tripler Army Medical Center and a period of light duty, he was reassigned as Battalion S-1, first in the 9th ID, then following a transition that included a brief period of assignment to the Hawaii National Guard's 29th Infantry Brigade, to the 3rd Battalion, 27th U.S. Infantry Regiment "Wolfhounds," 25th Infantry Division, at Schofield Barracks. During this period the U.S. Army was plagued by post-Vietnam problems, including post traumatic stress disorder, chronic illness, drug use, and organizational disruption. Hughes' job as Battalion S-1 in a post-Vietnam infantry battalion was one of the most challenging jobs of his career and formed many of his personal viewpoints on military service and the importance of individual responsibilities in the military. Hughes subsequently "branch transferred" to Military Intelligence (MI) and attended the Vietnam Military Assistance Training Advisor Course for the Republic of Vietnam (MATA-ARVN) at the John F. Kennedy Special Warfare Center and School, the Army Intelligence School, Fort Holabird, Maryland, and the Vietnam Military Assistance Security Advisor (MASA) Course back at the JFK Center. In August 1971 he was assigned as the Province Phung Hoang (Chiến dịch Phượng Hoàng) program (Phoenix Program) Military Advisor and Province S-2 Advisor, assigned to Advisory Team 49, Long Khánh Province (Vietnam), Military Region III, Civil Operations and Revolutionary Development Support (CORDS), U.S. Military Assistance Command, Vietnam. He remained in this assignment for 1 full year.

=== Intelligence work ===
Hughes attended the Army Intelligence Officer Advanced Course, Fort Huachuca, Arizona, graduating in June 1973. He was next assigned to Camp Zama, Japan. There he served as a strategic intelligence officer with Special Security Office (SSO) until March 1974 when he took command of Army SSO Field Detachment Japan. During this period Hughes provided support to United States Army, Japan, and I Corps (Forward) (USARJ/I Corps), the 500th Military Intelligence Group, and to the Defense Special Representative in Japan (DSR-J), Camp Zama, Japan, and to U.S. military elements in Tokyo, Japan.

In August 1977, Hughes began a series of stateside tours as a student at the United States Army Command and General Staff College, Fort Leavenworth, Kansas, where he acted as the illustrator and one of the designers for the Bell Yearbook for the 1977–78 class.

Next assigned to the Army's Office of the Assistant Chief of Staff for Intelligence (ACSI), at the Pentagon in Washington, D.C., he served as a Foreign Liaison Officer from June 1978 to May 1979; as an Intelligence Doctrine Staff Officer until March 1980 and as Assistant to Director of Army Staff, Office of the Chief of Staff until March 1981. During this period Hughes was able to travel widely in connection with his duties, including time in Israel and Egypt, and he participated in activities associated with the Camp David Accords." At the end of this assignment he was recruited for reassignment to the 9th Infantry Division and the Army's High Technology Test Bed (HTTB) which was just forming up at Fort Lewis, Washington.

Back with the 9th Infantry Division (United States), Hughes filled a number of billets, to include Executive Officer of the 109th Military Intelligence Battalion (Combat Electronic Warfare & Intelligence – CEWI) from June 1981 until September 1982. He then served as commander, 9th Operations Support Detachment until he became the 9th_Infantry_Division_(United_States) Division's Assistant Chief of Staff, G2, in May 1983. From there, Hughes took command of 109th MI Battalion. During this nearly 5-year period all of his assignments were directly connected to the HTTB effort, and included the initial use of computers in a tactical unit and at the Division G-2, the application of "dune buggies" in a variety of combat and combat support roles, the application of "state of the art" electronic warfare and electronic intelligence gathering capabilities, advanced camouflage, cover, concealment and denial and deception operations, the application of an experimental airframe and aerial intelligence gathering that formed the initial tactical applications for crewed and uncrewed (crewed test platform) battlefield airborne surveillance (Project Mercury Green), the field testing of new shelters and associated equipment, the testing of digital data input devices, the application in a field unit of long range electro-optic imaging systems and forward looking infrared systems, and numerous other similar activities.

In July 1986, Hughes was selected for a 2-year Advanced Operational Studies Fellowship (AOSF), at the United States Army School of Advanced Military Studies (SAMS), Fort Leavenworth, Kansas. After completing the first year of the fellowship – including travel all over the world and being part of one of the first U.S. military groups to visit the People's Republic of China – he remained at the school as a strategic studies research professor until April 1988.

Hughes was promoted to colonel in June 1988 and took command of the 501st Military Intelligence Brigade (Red Dragons), an element of United States Army Intelligence and Security Command, providing direct support to United States Forces Korea (USFK) and to the military forces of the Republic of Korea. In July 1990, he became the executive officer to the Commander in Chief, United Nations Command (Korea) / Combined Forces Command / United States Forces Korea.

In December 1990 then-Brigadier General Hughes was reassigned to the Office of the Deputy Chief of Staff for Intelligence (ODCSINT) at the Pentagon, and dual-hatted as an Assistant Deputy Chief of Staff for Intelligence (ADCSINT) and as the Commander, United States Army Intelligence Agency. This command included what was then known as the United States Army Foreign Science and Technology Center (FSTC) at Charlottesville, Virginia, the U.S. Army Missile and Space Intelligence Center (MSIC) at Huntsville, Alabama, the Army's Armed Forces Medical Intelligence Center (AFMIC) at Fort Detrick, Maryland, and the United States Army Intelligence Threat Analysis Center (ITAC). During this period Hughes assisted with direct intelligence support to Operation Desert Shield/Desert Storm including several trips to Saudi Arabia and significant intelligence preparation of the battlefield work in support of the Army's Chief of Intelligence in Theater (G-2, 3rd Army – ARCENT) and directly to U.S. ground combat units and special operating forces.

From June 1992 to July 1994, he served as the J2, United States Central Command, MacDill Air Force Base, Florida, a period of time that included continuing combat operations and enforcement of the southern no-fly zone in Iraq, enforcement of the Persian Gulf and Red Sea naval embargo, and ground operations in Battle of Mogadishu (1993) known as "Operation Restore Hope," seeking to moderate and end the Somali Civil War. He spent time in Somalia and Kenya during operations there. During this period Hughes also traveled throughout the Central Command Area of Responsibility (AOR) including challenging areas such as the Pakistan–Afghanistan border, the Line of Control between Pakistan and India, and transiting between Ethiopia and Eritrea.

In July 1994, then-Major General Hughes began work as the Director of Intelligence, J-2, Joint Staff. During this period a number of key military operations were undertaken which he supported, including interdiction operations in Kuwait and continued enforcement of Iraqi No-Fly Zones also known as Operation Southern Watch; Operation Uphold Democracy to stabilize conditions in Haiti; and operations in the Balkans including Operation Provide Promise and Operation Deliberate Force in Bosnia and Herzegovina during the Yugoslav Wars, and NATO bombing of Bosnian Serbs.

=== Defense Intelligence Agency ===
On February 16, 1996, then-Lieutenant General Hughes was appointed the 12th director of the Defense Intelligence Agency. During Hughes's tenure, the Defense Intelligence Community faced an explosion of technology, changing international and institutional relationships, and resource challenges. The nature and conduct of warfare was in transition. To support DIA's primary mission of providing intelligence for the war fighter, the Agency emphasized the use of information technology and the development of military intelligence information systems. Information had a central role for national defense and Joint Vision 2010 —America's Military: Preparing for Tomorrow, the joint war-fighting strategic plan, recognized information superiority as the basis for joint war-fighting doctrine and concepts. The vision for information technology was information superiority through global, affordable, and timely access to reliable and secure information for worldwide decision making and operations.

In March 1996, Hughes assisted by several DIA analysts, produced the first of DIA's "Purple Books" A Primer on the Future Threat, 1996–2010, which were extremely well received by policymakers, the Intelligence Community, and the warfighter. A product he conceived while he was the J-2, the "Purple Book" provided DIA's perspective of the future threat and was designed to stimulate discussion on the challenges facing U.S. interests. It was published in three additional editions in 1997, 1998, and 1999.

In October 1996, DIA celebrated its 35th anniversary of providing integrated and unified military intelligence to war fighters, policy makers, and force planners and modernizers. DIA also received a fourth Joint Meritorious Unit Award and, [William_Perry Secretary of Defense William Perry] proclaimed October 1 as Defense Intelligence Day. During 1996 DIA opened new Defense Attaché offices in Cambodia, Vietnam, Uzbekistan, Turkmenistan, Latvia, Rwanda and Slovenia.

DIA started the year 1997 with the groundbreaking ceremony for the new Missile and Space Intelligence Command facility on January 26 at Redstone Arsenal, Alabama. Mission enlargement and operational support defined 1997, as DIA provided analysis and information around the clock to military operations in Albania, Bosnia and Herzegovina, and the Democratic Republic of the Congo. Saddam Hussein's efforts to block UN inspection teams from presidential sites in October 1997 led to a buildup of U.S. and allied forces in the Persian Gulf. On March 13, 1997, U.S. military forces were used to evacuate certain U.S. Government employees and private American citizens from Tirana, Albania (Operation Silver Wake). In March 1997 a standby evacuation force of U.S. military personnel had been deployed to Congo and Gabon to provide enhanced security and to be available for any necessary evacuation operations. In May 1997, U.S. military personnel were deployed to Freetown, Sierra Leone, to prepare for and undertake the evacuation of certain U.S. government employees and private American citizens. In July 1997, in an effort to ensure the security of American citizens in Cambodia during a period of domestic conflict there, a Task Force of about 550 U.S. military personnel were deployed at Utapao Air Base in Thailand for possible evacuations. Other smaller operations were also ongoing during 1997, all of which DIA responded to in some way.

1998 began with problems in Iraq and elsewhere in several different regions. UN Secretary-General Kofi Annan went to Baghdad in February 1998 and reached an agreement that opened all sites suspected of being related to weapons of mass destruction. However, inspectors were not able to confirm or deny Iraqi possession of ballistic, biological, or chemical weapons. This called for focused intelligence work which continued for many years. During 1998, in response to intransigence and provocative acts by the government in Baghdad, a U.S.-led bombing campaign against Iraq began. Other crises existed in the Balkans, Burundi, the Central African Republic, the Congo, Ecuador, Peru, Rwanda, Sierra Leone, and Zaire. In June 1998, in response to an army mutiny in Guinea-Bissau endangering the U.S. Embassy, President Clinton deployed a standby evacuation force of U.S. military personnel to Dakar, Senegal, to evacuate from the city of Bissau. In August 1998 the U.S. conducted bombings of Afghanistan and Sudan (codenamed Operation Infinite Reach), including cruise missile strikes on terrorist bases in Afghanistan and a pharmaceutical factory in Sudan in August 1998. The attack was in retaliation for the bombings of American embassies in Kenya and Tanzania which killed 224 people (including 12 Americans) and injured 5,000 others. In September 1998 America deployed a stand-by response and evacuation force of 30 U.S. military personnel to increase the security force at the U.S. Embassy in Monrovia, Liberia.

In an historic event, the North Atlantic Treaty Organization took in three new members from the former Warsaw Pact military alliance in 1998: Hungary, Poland and the Czech Republic. DIA was directly involved in this transition from the Cold War period to the modern condition.

DIA lost two people in the line of duty during this period.

In 1998 DIA donated the original works of art associated with the landmark 1988 edition of Soviet Military Power to the Smithsonian Institution's National Air and Space Museum.

The Defense Intelligence Agency's Special Focus Group on North Korea was the recipient of the Killian Award for their work during 1998, the highest form of recognition for a person, group or organization for intelligence work given annually by the President's Foreign Intelligence Advisory Board, "to recognize those who have focused on foreign intelligence activities that are of critical importance to the national security of the United States."

The Defense Intel Alumni Association was instituted in December 1998 at the behest of key members of the DIA Staff who anticipated the need for an organization that would provide a framework for their continued participation in DIA and intelligence community activities.

In 1999, U.S. military personnel were deployed to Nairobi, Kenya, to coordinate assistance related to the bombings of the U.S. Embassies in Kenya and Tanzania. Activities in East Timor with regard to East Timor Independence also drew DIA's interest and a limited number of U.S. military forces were deployed with the UN to restore peace there. DIA also supported NATO's bombing of Serbia in the Kosovo Conflict (Operation Allied Force).

During this period (1998–1999) DIA began work in the cyber intelligence realm, blazing a trail through what was at that time an unknown "wilderness of electronic mirrors." DIA's work was led by and performed by true "technical pioneers, one of whom stands out against the ambient background of this complex area of intelligence and security concern – Mr. Don Lewis.

On the occasion of the DIA Change of Command on July 27, 1999 – DIA was once again awarded the Joint Meritorious Unit Award (5th Award) – marking the second instance of this recognition during Hughes' Directorship.

== Awards and decorations ==
U.S. military decorations
Defense Distinguished Service Medal with two bronze oak leaf clusters
Department of Homeland Security Distinguished Service Medal
Silver Star awarded for gallantry in combat
Legion of Merit with 2 Oak Leaf Clusters
Bronze Star with Valor device and 4 Oak Leaf Clusters (3 valor awards; 2 meritorious service awards)
Purple Heart
Defense Meritorious Service Medal
Meritorious Service Medal with 4 Oak Leaf Clusters
Air Medal (for airmobile operations in combat)
Army Commendation Medal with Valor device and Oak Leaf Cluster (1 valor award; 1 meritorious service award)
Army Good Conduct Medal
National Defense Service Medal with one bronze service star
Armed Forces Expeditionary Medal
Vietnam Service Medal with 4 stars
Korea Defense Service Medal
Army Service Ribbon
Army Overseas Service Ribbon with bronze award numeral 2
National non-military awards
National Intelligence Distinguished Service Medal (two awards)
National Reconnaissance Office Distinguished Service Medal
Foreign awards
Korean Order of Civil Merit, Moran Medal
Order of National Security Merit Sam IL Medal (Republic of Korea)
National Police Cooperation Medal (National Police Agency, Republic of Korea)
Vietnam Gallantry Cross with gold and silver stars
Vietnam Armed Forces Honor Medal, 1st class
Gold Badge of Honour of the Bundeswehr (Germany)
Cross of Merit of the Minister of Defence of the Czech Republic in gold
Order of Merit of the Republic of Hungary, Officer's Cross (Military)
Armed Forces Gold Medal (Slovenia)
Vietnam Campaign Medal
Unit awards
Joint Meritorious Unit Award with oak leaf cluster
Army Meritorious Unit Commendation
Vietnam Gallantry Cross Unit Citation
Vietnam Civil Actions Unit Citation
Badges
Combat Infantryman Badge
Basic Parachutist Badge
Army Staff Identification Badge
United States Central Command Badge
Office of the Joint Chiefs of Staff Identification Badge
Defense Intelligence Agency Badge
Expert Marksmanship Badge
9th Infantry Division Combat Service Identification Badge
Army Military Intelligence Corps Distinctive Unit Insignia

Hughes is also the recipient of the Director of Central Intelligence Agency Director's Award, the Central Intelligence Agency Seal Medallion, and the Military Intelligence Corps Knowlton Award.

Hughes has also been awarded the Eagle Award and the Minuteman Award from The National Guard Bureau and a similar award from the US Army Reserve, the Director's Distinguished Service Award from the Office of National Drug Control Policy, and the Director's Award for Distinguished Service from the National Reconnaissance Office. He has received recognition for distinguished service from the National Security Agency, the National Geospatial-Intelligence Agency, the United States Department of Homeland Security, the United States Secret Service, and U.S. Immigration and Customs Enforcement. He has been honored for distinguished intelligence service by The Armed Forces Communications and Electronics Association.

Hughes is a member of the Military Intelligence Hall of Fame, and the US Army Reserve Officer Training Corps National Hall of Fame.

Hughes has also received other awards from Allied nations.

Multiple awards have been created in Hughes' honor to provide support the intelligence community. This includes the Lieutenant General Patrick M. Hughes Award from the National Military Intelligence Association, and the Patrick M. Hughes Inspiration Scholarship from the Lint Center for National Security Studies.

== Personal life ==
Hughes and his wife Karlene have two children: Barry and Chad.

Hughes began a successful private consulting effort after his retirement from the U.S. Army, in the areas of intelligence, security and international relations. He worked for many of the leading defense and security companies and participated in Defense Science Board and Defense Advanced Research Projects Agency (DARPA) activities. He also was employed as a consultant for the Central Intelligence Agency examining some of the CIA's efforts in countering terrorists and in developing capabilities that could be applied in asymmetric and asynchronous conditions. He also served on the advisory board of the National Geospatial Intelligence Agency's InnoVision Directorate; he performed work for the Department of Energy and other government organizations, and was a member of advisory boards for both the Pacific Northwest National Laboratory and Sandia National Laboratories. He participated in reviews of the National Reconnaissance Office and the Civil Applications Committee Blue Ribbon Study, and other similar assessments.

In November 2003, Hughes was asked to assume duties as the Assistant Secretary for Information (Intelligence) Analysis (IA) at the newly formed Department of Homeland Security (DHS). He participated in the stand-up of this capability at DHS and in the formative period of the department.

Hughes departed the DHS in March 2005 and returned to the defense and security industry working for L-3 Communications Corporation as the Corporate Vice President – Intelligence & Counterterrorism.

Hughes died on October 5, 2024. He was buried at the Arlington National Cemetery on August 4, 2025.

Government offices
Preceded by Col (Ret.) William H. Parrish	Assistant Secretary of Homeland Security for Information Analysis; November 17, 2003 – March 15, 2005	Succeeded by Charles E. Allen
