= Daniel Tamburello =

American politician

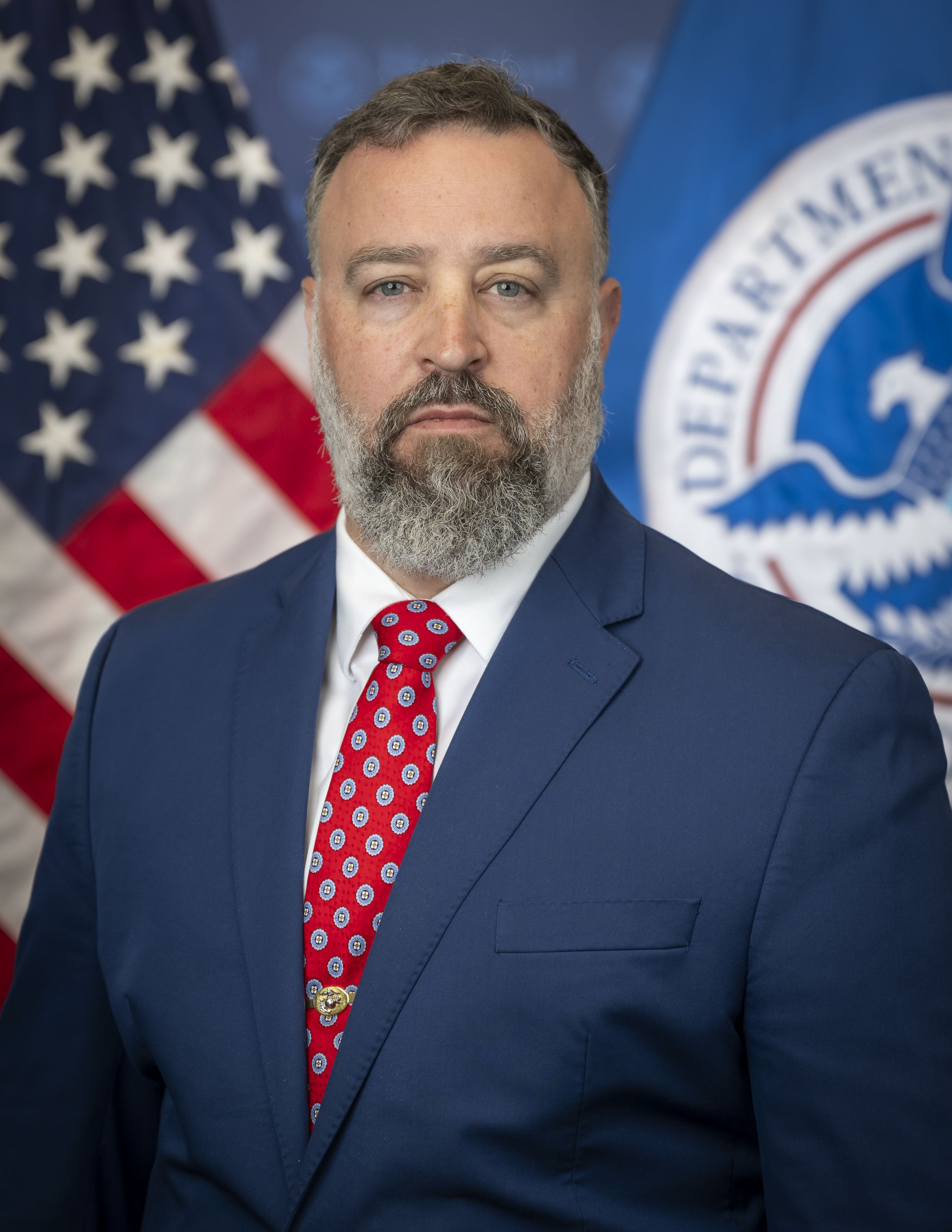
- Official portrait, 2025

Acting Under Secretary of Homeland Security for Science and Technology
- In office August 20, 2025 – January 20, 2026
- President: Donald Trump
- Preceded by: Julie S. Brewer (Acting)
- Succeeded by: Pedro Allende

Acting Under Secretary of Homeland Security for Intelligence and Analysis
- In office February 26, 2025 – October 27, 2025
- President: Donald Trump
- Preceded by: Avery Alpha (Acting)
- Succeeded by: Matthew Kozma

Member of the New Hampshire House of Representatives
- In office 2010–2016

Personal details
- Education: Liberty University; Johns Hopkins University

Military service
- Branch/service: United States Marine Corps

Daniel J. Tamburello is a Republican Party politician who served in the New Hampshire House of Representatives from 2010 to 2016, where he represented the Rockingham 5 district.

On February 26, 2025, Tamburello was appointed acting Under Secretary of Homeland Security for Intelligence and Analysis. Following the Senate confirmation of Matthew Kozma to the role, Tamburello was named acting Under Secretary of Homeland Security for Science and Technology.

== Early life and education ==
Tamburello grew up in Morris County, New Jersey, where he attended West Morris Mendham High School. He was a resident of Londonderry, New Hampshire; however, he now resides in Maryland with his wife and three sons.

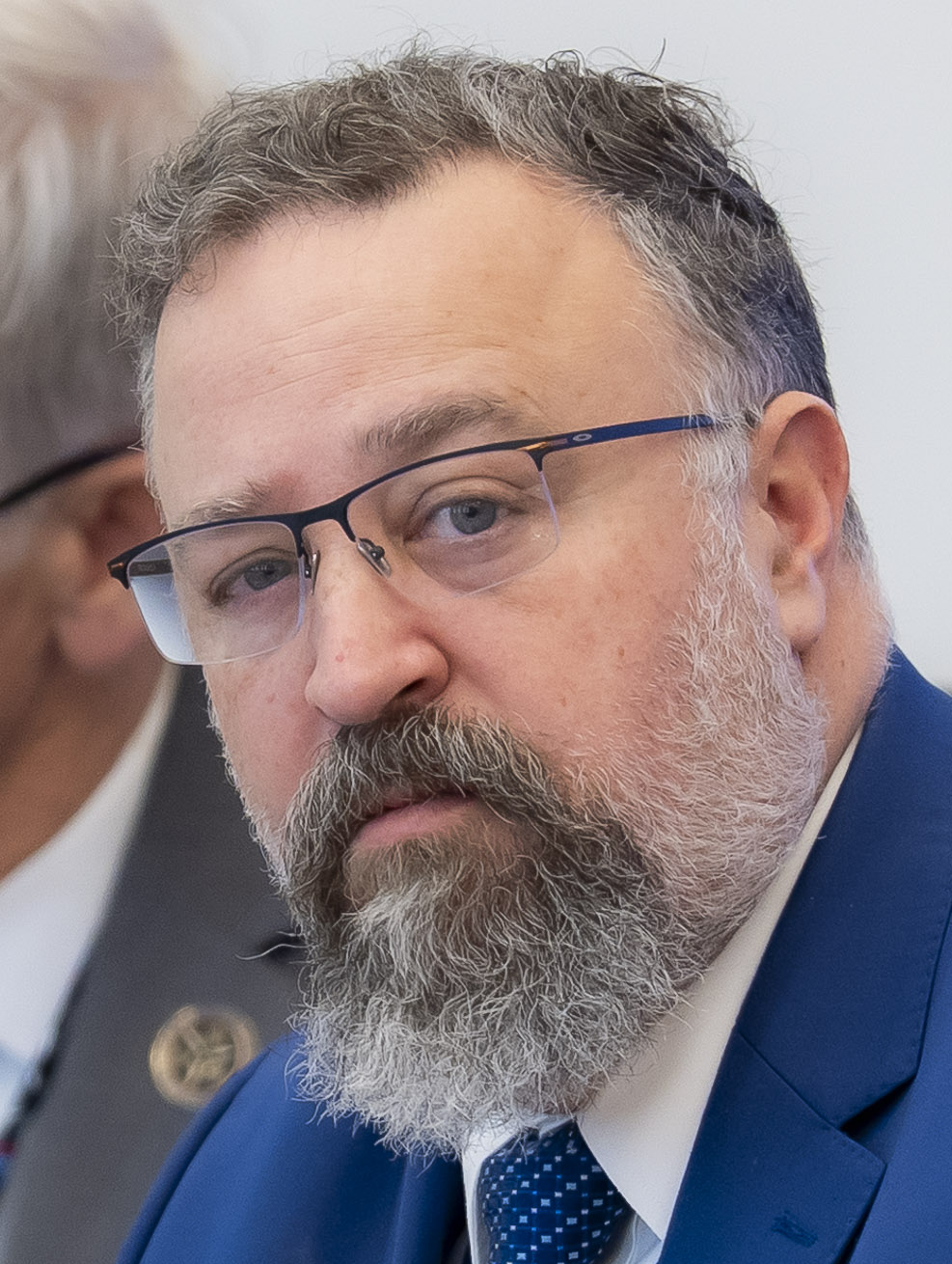
Daniel Tamburello in 2026

Tamburello was awarded an undergraduate degree from Liberty University and received a master's degree from Johns Hopkins University. He served in the United States Marine Corps.
