= Francis X. Taylor =

Former USAF general and Homeland Security official

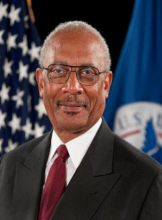

Under Secretary of Homeland Security for Intelligence and Analysis
- In office April 14, 2014 – January 20, 2017
- President: Barack Obama
- Preceded by: Caryn Wagner
- Succeeded by: David J. Glawe

Member of Privacy and Civil Liberties Oversight Board
- In office March 14, 2006 – January 29, 2010
- President: George W. Bush
- Preceded by: Position established
- Succeeded by: Rachel Brand

6th Assistant Secretary of State for Diplomatic Security
- In office November 18, 2002 – February 19, 2005
- President: George W. Bush
- Preceded by: David G. Carpenter
- Succeeded by: Richard J. Griffin

12th Coordinator for Counterterrorism
- In office July 13, 2001 – November 15, 2002
- President: George W. Bush
- Preceded by: Michael A. Sheehan
- Succeeded by: J. Cofer Black

Commander of the Air Force Office of Special Investigations
- In office September 1996 – May 2001
- Preceded by: Robert A. Hoffmann
- Succeeded by: L. Eric Patterson

Personal details
- Born: Francis Xavier Taylor; 1948 (age 77–78)
- Education: University of Notre Dame (BA); University of Notre Dame (MA)
- Nickname: "Frank"

Military service
- Branch/service: United States Air Force
- Years of service: 1970–2001
- Rank: Brigadier General
- Commands: Air Force Office of Special Investigations
- Awards: Air Force Distinguished Service Medal; Defense Superior Service Medal; Legion of Merit; Distinguished Honor Award; National Intelligence Distinguished Service Medal

Francis Xavier Taylor (born 1948) is the former Under Secretary of Homeland Security for Intelligence and Analysis at the U.S. Department of Homeland Security (DHS), nominated by President Obama in 2014. In that role, he provided the Secretary, DHS senior leadership, the DHS components, and state, local, tribal and private sector partners with homeland security intelligence and information they need to keep the country safe, secure and resilient. DHS Office of Intelligence and Analysis is a member of, and the department's liaison to, the U.S. Intelligence Community.

Taylor was also a member of the Privacy and Civil Liberties Oversight Board from 2006 to 2010. He was the former Assistant Secretary of State for Diplomatic Security from 2002 to 2005, and the United States Coordinator for Counterterrorism from 2001 to 2002. Taylor is also a retired Air Force Brigadier General with his last military assignment as the Commander of the Air Force Office of Special Investigations from 1996 to 2001.

== Military career ==
Taylor was educated at the University of Notre Dame, graduating with a B.A. in government and international studies in 1970. Taylor was involved in the Air Force Reserve Officer Training Corps during university and upon graduation, was commissioned as a Second Lieutenant in the United States Air Force. He became a trainee agent in the U.S. Air Force Office of Special Investigations (AFOSI), and then attended the U.S. Air Force Special Investigations School in Washington, D.C. From 1970 to 1972, he was a counterintelligence officer at the Middle East, Africa and South Asia Division at AFOSI. From 1972 to 1974, he attended the Air Force Institute of Technology at Notre Dame, receiving an M.A. in government and international studies in 1974.

Taylor spent 1974–76 in the Acquisition and Analysis Division of AFOSI's Directorate of Counterintelligence. In April 1976, he became chief of the Counterintelligence Acquisition and Analysis Branch in Ankara. He spent 1977–83 at Bolling AFB, D.C., becoming commander of AFOSI Detachment 411 in September 1977; chief of Resource Career Management Division in AFOSI's Directorate of Personnel in April 1979; and then commander of the Headquarters Squadron Section in October 1980. He then spent fall and winter 1983 at the Armed Forces Staff College.

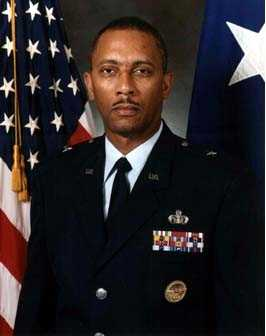
Francis X. Taylor during his time in the United States Air Force.

In January 1984, Taylor became deputy director for operations in the Directorate of Counterintelligence and Investigative Programs in the Office of the Under Secretary of Defense for Policy. From July 1987 to July 1988, he studied at the Air War College. In July 1988, he became deputy commander of the 487th Combat Support Group at Comiso Air Station in Comiso. He became commander of AFOSI District 45 at Osan Air Base in July 1990; and then commander of AFOSI Region 2 at Langley Air Force Base in July 1992. He returned to Bolling AFB in August 1994 as director of mission guidance at Headquarters AFOSI.

In August 1995, he became director of special investigations in the Office of the Air Force Inspector General. He spent July 1996 through July 1998 as commander of AFOSI at Bolling AFB, D.C., where he was responsible for providing commanders of all Air Force activities independent professional investigative services in fraud, counterintelligence, and major criminal matters. In August 1998, Headquarters AFOSI moved to Andrews AFB, MD. Taylor has received numerous awards and decorations, including the Distinguished Service Medal, the Defense Superior Service Medal, and the Legion of Merit, Taylor retired from active duty on July 1, 2001.

Effective dates of promotion

Insignia	Rank	Date
	Brigadier General	September 1, 1996
	Colonel	February 1, 1991
	Lieutenant Colonel	March 1, 1985
	Major	July 1, 1982
	Captain	February 15, 1974
	First Lieutenant	January 15, 1972
	Second Lieutenant	June 6, 1970

== Post-military career ==
In 2001, President George W. Bush nominated Taylor to be Coordinator for Counterterrorism, and Taylor subsequently held this office from July 13, 2001, until November 15, 2002. In this role, he was responsible for implementing U.S. counterterrorism policy overseas and coordinating the U.S. government response to international terrorist activities. In the aftermath of the September 11, 2001, attacks, he was a key advisor in assisting the President Bush and Secretary of State Colin Powell in forming the international coalition against terrorism and developing aggressive international policy implementation to defeat terrorism.

President Bush then nominated Taylor to be Assistant Secretary of State for Diplomatic Security and Director of the Office of Foreign Missions, with a rank of Ambassador. Taylor held this office from November 18, 2002, until February 19, 2005. As Assistant Secretary, Taylor oversaw all Department of State security programs that protect all U.S. government employees and buildings overseas from terrorist, criminal or technical attack, and ensure the integrity of classified national security information produced and stored in these facilities. Leading more than 32,500 US, foreign and contractor personnel, he provided security for all U.S. government employees assigned to over 250 U.S. embassies and consulates worldwide. The Ambassador also directed the law enforcement function of the Bureau, wherein Diplomatic Security Service special agents protect the Secretary of State and foreign dignitaries who visit the United States and conduct criminal investigations of violation of U.S. Visa and Immigration statutes. As Director of the Office of Foreign Missions, Taylor regulated the activities of foreign missions in the United States to protect the foreign policy and national security interests of the United States and safeguard the American public from abuses of privileges and immunities by diplomatic and consular officials.

Taylor joined the General Electric Company as vice president and Chief Security Officer on March 7, 2005. He is responsible for overseeing GE's global security operations and crisis management processes.

In 2006, Bush appointed Taylor to the Privacy and Civil Liberties Oversight Board.

On February 12, 2014, President Barack Obama announced his intent to nominate Taylor as the Under Secretary of Homeland Security for Intelligence and Analysis for the Department of Homeland Security.

Taylor has also received numerous civilian awards and decorations, including the National Intelligence Distinguished Service Medal and the State Department Distinguished Honor Award.

On August 17, 2017, Taylor was named an executive fellow of the Global Policy Initiative in the new Keough School of Global Affairs at the University of Notre Dame.

== Personal life ==
Taylor is married to Constance O. Taylor and together the couple have three children.

In the 2024 United States presidential election, Taylor endorsed Kamala Harris.

== See also ==
- Bureau of Counterterrorism and Countering Violent Extremism

Government offices
Preceded by William E. Terry Jr.	Under Secretary of Homeland Security for Intelligence and Analysis; April 14, 2014 - January 20, 2017	Succeeded by David J. Glawe
Preceded by Position established	Member of Privacy and Civil Liberties Oversight Board; March 14, 2006 – January 29, 2010	Succeeded by Rachel L. Brand
Preceded by David G. Carpenter	Assistant Secretary of State for Diplomatic Security; November 18, 2002 – February 19, 2005	Succeeded by Richard J. Griffin
Preceded by Michael A. Sheehan	Coordinator for Counterterrorism; July 13, 2001 – November 15, 2002	Succeeded by J. Cofer Black
Military offices
Preceded by BG Robert A. Hoffmann	Commander of the Air Force Office of Special Investigations; September 1996 – May 2001	Succeeded by BG L. Eric Patterson
