= Kenneth L. Wainstein =

American lawyer and government official (born 1962)

Ken Wainstein
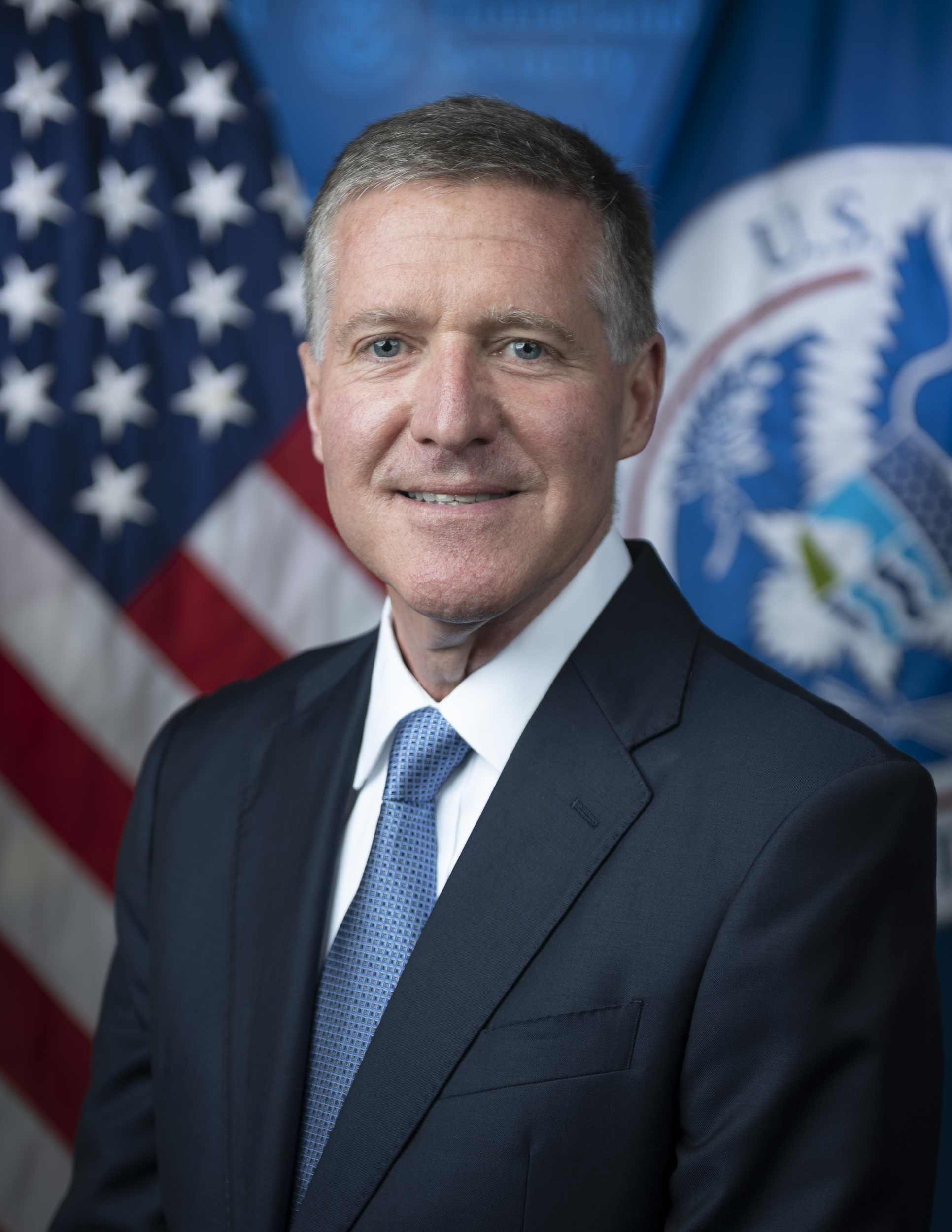
- Official portrait, 2022

Under Secretary of Homeland Security for Intelligence and Analysis
- In office June 13, 2022 – January 20, 2025
- President: Joe Biden
- Preceded by: David Glawe
- Succeeded by: Matthew Kozma

4th United States Homeland Security Advisor
- In office March 30, 2008 – January 20, 2009
- President: George W. Bush
- Preceded by: Frances Townsend
- Succeeded by: John O. Brennan

United States Assistant Attorney General for the National Security Division
- In office September 28, 2006 – March 30, 2008
- President: George W. Bush
- Preceded by: Position established
- Succeeded by: Patrick Rowan

United States Attorney for the District of Columbia
- In office May 2004 – September 28, 2006
- President: George W. Bush
- Preceded by: Roscoe Howard
- Succeeded by: Ronald Machen

Personal details
- Born: Kenneth Leonard Wainstein; 1962 (age 63–64)
- Education: University of Virginia (BA); University of California, Berkeley (JD)

Kenneth Leonard Wainstein (born 1962) is an American lawyer. He served as the first assistant attorney general for national security, and later as the homeland security advisor to United States President George W. Bush. In 2022 under the Biden administration, he was appointed under secretary of homeland security for intelligence and analysis. He served in this position until 2025.

== Education ==
Wainstein earned a B.A. from the University of Virginia where he was a member of Phi Beta Kappa. He went on to earned a J.D. from the University of California at Berkeley where he was the Note and Comment Editor of the California Law Review.

Following law school, Wainstein served as law clerk to the Honorable Thomas Penfield Jackson of the U.S. District Court in the District of Columbia.

== Career ==
Wainstein worked for the Federal Bureau of Investigation, as General Counsel and as Chief of Staff to the FBI Director. He was the United States attorney for the District of Columbia.

On September 26, 2006, he was sworn in as the Department of Justice's assistant attorney general responsible for National Security.

Wainstein was appointed homeland security advisor by President George W. Bush on March 30, 2008. He was also assistant to the president for homeland security and counterterrorism and chaired the Homeland Security Council. He was appointed as the "national continuity coordinator" under the auspices of National Security Presidential Directive 51.

After leaving the Bush administration, Wainstein joined the law firm of O'Melveny & Myers. In 2012, he moved to Cadwalader, Wickersham & Taft, where he was co-chair of the firm's litigation department and chair of the white-collar group. During his time at Cadwalader, Waintstein conducted an investigation which uncovered academic fraud and the University of North Carolina at Chapel Hill. The 136-page report detailed a complex, multi-year scheme to inflate the grades of student athletes.

From 2017 to 2020 Wainstein was a partner at the law firm of Davis Polk & Wardwell LLP While at Davis Polk, Wainstein was reported to have represented clients including AstraZeneca Pharmaceuticals LP; Chevron Corp; Comcast Corp; JP Morgan Chase Bank NA; Walmart Inc; Purdue Pharma; HSBC Holdings PLC; Facebook Inc; and General Dynamics Corp.

On November 5, 2021, President Joseph Biden nominated Wainstein for the position of under secretary of homeland security for intelligence and analysis. The United States Senate Select Committee on Intelligence held its open hearing on his nomination on January 12, 2022. The United States Senate Committee on Homeland Security and Governmental Affairs held its hearing on his nomination on February 3, 2022. The full Senate voted to confirm Wainstein 63–35 on June 7, 2022. He was sworn in on June 13, 2022.

Wainstein joined Mayer Brown in April 2025 to lead the law firm's global investigations and white collar practice.

== Personal life ==
Wainstein also serves as a member of the Blue Ribbon Study Panel on Biodefense, a group that encourages and advocates changes to government policy to strengthen national biodefense.

Wainstein's mother, Eleanor Sullivan Wainstein was a defense research analyst with the Rand Corporation from 1952 to 1989. For more than 30 years she specialized in U.S.-Soviet economic research.

Wainstein has two siblings: Anne W. Bond and Richard Wainstein.

In 2020, Wainstein, along with over 130 other former Republican national security officials, signed a statement that asserted that President Trump was unfit to serve another term, and "To that end, we are firmly convinced that it is in the best interest of our nation that Vice President Joe Biden be elected as the next President of the United States, and we will vote for him." Months later, Wainstein joined with 19 other Republican-appointed former U.S. attorneys endorsing Joe Biden.

== See also ==
- List of Jewish American jurists

Legal offices
Preceded by Roscoe Howard	United States Attorney for the District of Columbia; 2004–2006	Succeeded by Ronald Machen
New office	United States Assistant Attorney General for the National Security Division; 2006–2008	Succeeded by Patrick Rowan
Political offices
Preceded by Frances Townsend	United States Homeland Security Advisor; 2008–2009	Succeeded by John O. Brennan
