= National Insurance Crime Bureau =

American insurance trade association

- Type: Trade association
- Industry: Insurance
- Founded: 1912
- Headquarters: Oak Brook, Illinois, US
- Key people: David J. Glawe, CEO
- Products: Insurance
- Services: Insurance Fraud and Crime Investigations
- Number of employees: 400 (2022)
- Website: www.nicb.org

The National Insurance Crime Bureau (NICB) is a U.S. insurance industry trade association focused on preventing, detecting and defeating insurance fraud and vehicle theft through information analysis, investigations, training, legislative advocacy and public awareness.

NICB's headquarters are in Oak Brook, Illinois.

Much of NICB's focus is on motor vehicle theft. It has advocated for better insurance fraud statutes in the criminal codes drafted by state legislatures. Tools and reports the NICB provides to combat car theft include VINCheck, "a free lookup service provided to the public to assist in determining if a vehicle may have a record of an insurance theft claim", a Report Fraud hotline, and two reports: Hot Wheels, which lists the most commonly stolen vehicles; and Hot Spots, the locations across the United States where auto thefts are most common.

== History ==
NICB was formed in 1992 by a merger of the National Automobile Theft Bureau (NATB) and the Insurance Crime Prevention Institute (ICPI), both of which were not-for-profit organizations. NATB, founded in the early 20th century, managed vehicle theft investigations and developed vehicle theft databases for use by the insurance industry. ICPI investigated insurance fraud for approximately 20 years before joining with the NATB to form the National Insurance Crime Bureau.

NICB is supported by more than 1,100 property and casualty insurance companies and self-insured companies dedicated to combating insurance fraud and crime.

David J. Glawe is the current president and chief executive officer of NICB.
