= Lint Center for National Security Studies =

Lint Center for National Security Studies, Inc.
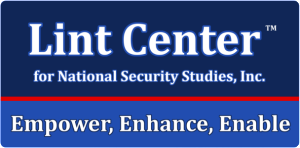
- Formation: 2007; 19 years ago
- Founder: James R. Lint
- Type: Non-profit 501(c)(3) organization
- Purpose: Scholarship, Counterintelligence, International Relations
- Headquarters: Henderson, Nevada
- Services: Financial aid, mentorship, publishing
- Methods: Donations and volunteers
- Key people: James R. Lint, Chairman/CEO Anna Hyonjoo Lint, PhD, Vice Chairwoman; Timothy W. Coleman, Vice President; Ryan R. Sofranko, Chief Operations Officer Kay Lee Nicholas, Director and Scholarship Committee Member
- Website: LintCenter.org

The Lint Center for National Security Studies was a non-profit organization created to provide merit-based scholarships for counterintelligence and national security workers and scholars, and to advance the study of national security. The center is veteran and minority operated and managed, using an all-volunteer force to promote awareness of their scholarship opportunities through online media projects. The Lint Center utilizes three programs of mentorship, publishing, and scholarship, and aims to fill a niche void in counterintelligence by recognizing new potential and providing practitioner guidance to those aspiring to advance national security.

The Lint Center was founded in 2007 by retired Special Agent James Lint to develop emerging leaders in national security and intelligence assessment. The Lint Center's primary focus is to provide support for the next generation of America’s national security workforce by helping to achieve educational goals. Its mission statement is to provide a support system for those who serve freedom around the world. The center involves a scholarship and mentorship program, with more than 200 volunteer professionals mentoring students pursuing careers in national intelligence service. As an all-volunteer force, the center has no administrative costs or overhead and all funds from donations go directly to scholarships.

== Mentorship program ==
These volunteers provide mentees with the opportunity to ask for advice, seek guidance on career paths and options, and gain a better understanding of the protocols within their field of interest. Anna Hyonjoo Lint, Ph.D., the center's Vice Chairwoman, explained that “The purpose of the Center is to empower, enhance, and enable the next generation of America’s counterintelligence and national security workforce through scholarship initiatives.” The mentoring program also serves to dispel myths about careers in intelligence and security, since the nature of intelligence work is secretive and known to the public primarily through movies and television.

== Scholarship program ==
Applicants to the Lint Center scholarships must write an essay demonstrating "their ability to think outside the box when it comes to national security." Since 2007, the Lint Center has awarded 36 scholarships. Recipients of the center's scholarships are connected with mentors within the students' field of interest.

In 2015, the Lint Center announced a partnership with a new corporate sponsor, Spies of Washington Tour, which provides comprehensive tours featuring the history of espionage and intelligence operations in the United States. The sponsor donated tours to the winners of the 2015 Lint Center scholarships.

=== Current Scholarships ===
==== Jim & Anna Hyonjoo Lint Scholarship ====
The flagship scholarship at the Lint Center, the Hyonjoo Lint Scholarship was established in 2009 to further the education and career development of scholars, with a focus in the area of International Affairs, Counterintelligence, and National Security. The winner of the scholarship must demonstrate their commitment to improving national security and mutual global understanding. The scholarship was awarded from 2009 to 2016.

==== Lee & Byun International Relations and Cultural Awareness Scholarship ====
The Lee & Byun Scholarship was first awarded in 2009, named after Eekwon Lee and Jongja Byun. Eekwon Lee is a former South Korean native noncombatant, and Jongja Byun was a North Korean refugee and internally displaced person in the Korean War. A civilian during the war, Byun survived the execution of her father by Communist militants at the Chosin Reservoir, after which she and one of her sisters were evacuated to Pusan, South Korea, leaving behind her remaining family which haven't been heard from since. The scholarship, which is part of the Lint Center's Pioneer Fund for Unfettered Freedom, Excellence, and Entrepreneurship, seeks to assist with tuition and educational costs for applicants who work toward improving international relations and cultural awareness.

The scholarship is open to both American citizens and foreign applicants, and was awarded from 2013 to 2016.

==== Richard S. Eaton Jr. Memorial Scholarship ====
The Eaton Memorial Scholarship was created in honor of US Army Counterintelligence Special Agent, Staff Sgt. Richard S. Eaton, Jr., recipient of the Bronze Star who died in Ar Ramadi, Iraq, on August 12, 2003. The scholarship was awarded from 2010 to 2016.

==== International Association for Intelligence Education Scholarship ====
The IAFIE scholarship is an annual merit-based award created in 2016 to support students interested in counterintelligence through a partnership with the International Association for Intelligence Education. The IAFIE also assists in providing mentorship and expanding the Lint Center Virtual Archives for National Security (LC-VANS).

==== Patrick M. Hughes Inspiration Scholarship ====
The Patrick M. Hughes Inspiration Scholarship is a one-time award created in 2016 in honor of Lieutenant General Hughes, who retired from the U.S. Army after 37 years of service. Hughes was nominated by President George W. Bush and confirmed by Congress to serve as Assistant Secretary of Information Analysis, Department Homeland Security, a position he held from 2003 to 2005. He has since joined the private sector, specializing in intelligence, national security, and international relations.

=== Past scholarships ===
The Lint Center cycles through scholarships on a yearly basis, sometimes establishing one-time or limited awards in honor of a donor or prominent figure in national security. Past scholarships at the Lint Center include the Virginia and Frank Misselhorn Memorial Scholarship (awarded from 2007 to 2015), The Aehee Kim Alliance Building Scholarship (2008), the Ben Franklin Scholarship (2009-2010), the Jack McCoy Scholarship (2009-2012), the John Joseph McGurk III Memorial Scholarship (2011), and the Major James W. Dennehy Esquire Scholarship (2014).

== Publications ==
The Lint Center sponsors online discussion groups on counterintelligence and security information management for government agents and military personnel. It also sponsors several websites focused on security management, counterintelligence, and cross-cultural education. The center hosts a blog on similar subjects on its website, and several mentors and volunteers contribute content on external blogs and news websites.

== Presidential recognition ==
In 2014, on the anniversary of the 9/11 attacks on New York in 2001, President George W. Bush's Points of Light Foundation recognized the Lint Center for its efforts to guide a new generation of the American intelligence workforce. The Points of Light Foundation was created to promote the spirit of volunteerism, and awarded the Lint Center the Daily Point of Light Award for its entirely volunteer workforce.

== See also ==
- Counter-intelligence and counter-terrorism organizations
- United States Intelligence Community
- United States Army Counterintelligence
- United States Department of Justice National Security Division
- List of counterintelligence organizations
- List of intelligence gathering disciplines
