= Rachel Brand =

American attorney (born 1973)

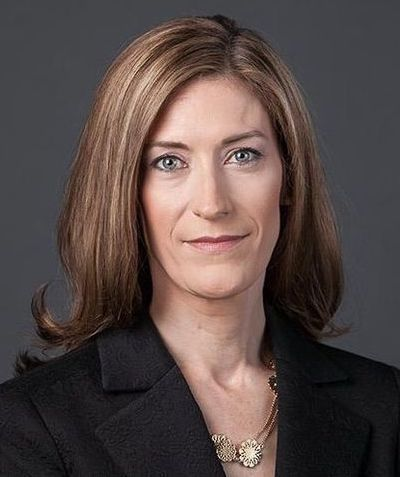
- Brand in September 2017

18th United States Associate Attorney General
- In office May 22, 2017 – February 20, 2018
- President: Donald Trump
- Preceded by: Tony West (2014)
- Succeeded by: Vanita Gupta (2021)

Member of the Privacy and Civil Liberties Oversight Board
- In office August 2012 – February 2017
- Nominated by: Barack Obama
- Preceded by: Francis X. Taylor
- Succeeded by: Jane Nitze

United States Assistant Attorney General for the Office of Legal Policy
- In office March 28, 2005 – July 9, 2007; Acting: March 28, 2005 – July 28, 2005
- President: George W. Bush
- Preceded by: Daniel Bryant
- Succeeded by: Elisebeth Cook

Personal details
- Born: Rachel Lee Brand; May 1, 1973 (age 53) Muskegon, Michigan, U.S.
- Spouse: Jonathan Cohn
- Children: 2
- Education: University of Minnesota Morris (BA); Harvard University (JD)

Rachel Lee Brand (born May 1, 1973) is an American lawyer, academic, and former government official. She served as the United States Associate Attorney General from May 22, 2017, until February 20, 2018, when she resigned to take a job as head of global corporate governance at Walmart. Brand was the first woman to serve as Associate Attorney General. She also served as Assistant Attorney General for the Office of Legal Policy in the George W. Bush administration and was appointed by President Barack Obama to serve on the Privacy and Civil Liberties Oversight Board. Prior to becoming Associate Attorney General, Brand was an associate professor at Antonin Scalia Law School.

== Early life and education ==
Brand was born in Muskegon, Michigan, and raised in Pella, Iowa, where she attended Pella Christian High School. Brand studied at the University of Minnesota Morris from 1991 to 1995, graduating with high distinction and honors with a Bachelor of Arts in political science.

She then attended Harvard Law School, where she was deputy editor-in-chief of the Harvard Journal of Law and Public Policy. She graduated in 1998 with a J.D. cum laude. After graduating, Brand clerked for Massachusetts Supreme Judicial Court Justice Charles Fried in 1998–1999 and for U.S. Supreme Court Justice Anthony Kennedy in 2002–2003. In 1999, she also served as General Counsel for Elizabeth Dole's presidential exploratory committee. From 1999 to 2000, Brand worked at the firm Cooper, Carvin, & Rosenthal, now known as Cooper & Kirk.

== Career ==
=== Bush administration (2000–2007) ===
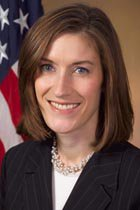
Brand in 2005

Brand was part of the legal team representing George W. Bush during the 2000 United States presidential election recount in Florida, and also served briefly as associate counsel in Bush's transition team. Brand later served as President Bush's assistant counsel and associate counsel. Beginning in 2003, she served as an Assistant Attorney General for the Office of Legal Policy in the George W. Bush administration where she helped shepherd the Supreme Court nominations of John Roberts and Samuel Alito. Brand's portfolio also included shaping the administration's position on reauthorization of the Patriot Act, in which capacity she testified before the United States Senate Committee on the Judiciary on the benefits of using administrative subpoenas in terrorism investigations.

During her tenure at the Justice Department, Brand was tangentially involved in the controversy surrounding Attorney General Alberto Gonzales's dismissal of several United States Attorneys. She was floated by the department's leadership as a top candidate to replace Margaret Chiara, who was ousted as part of the purge. Brand ultimately declined the position, however, and resigned from the Department of Justice in June 2007.

After leaving the Justice Department, Brand worked for three years at WilmerHale. In 2008, John McCain, then a candidate for the Republican Party's presidential nomination, named Brand to his Justice Advisory Committee, which would have recommended judicial nominees to McCain were he elected.

=== Privacy and Civil Liberties Oversight Board (2012–2017) ===
In 2012, Brand was appointed by President Barack Obama to serve on the Privacy and Civil Liberties Oversight Board (PCLOB). She was confirmed on August 2, 2012 to a term ending January 29, 2017.

Brand dissented from several recommendations included in the PCLOB's 2014 report on NSA's bulk metadata collection program under section 215 of the USA PATRIOT Act. She declined to join in the Board's view that the program was illegal as a statutory matter and argued that, in policy terms, it struck a justifiable balance between privacy and national security and, as such, should not be discontinued. The Board, for its part, had recommended the program's termination.

=== Associate Attorney General (2017–2018) ===
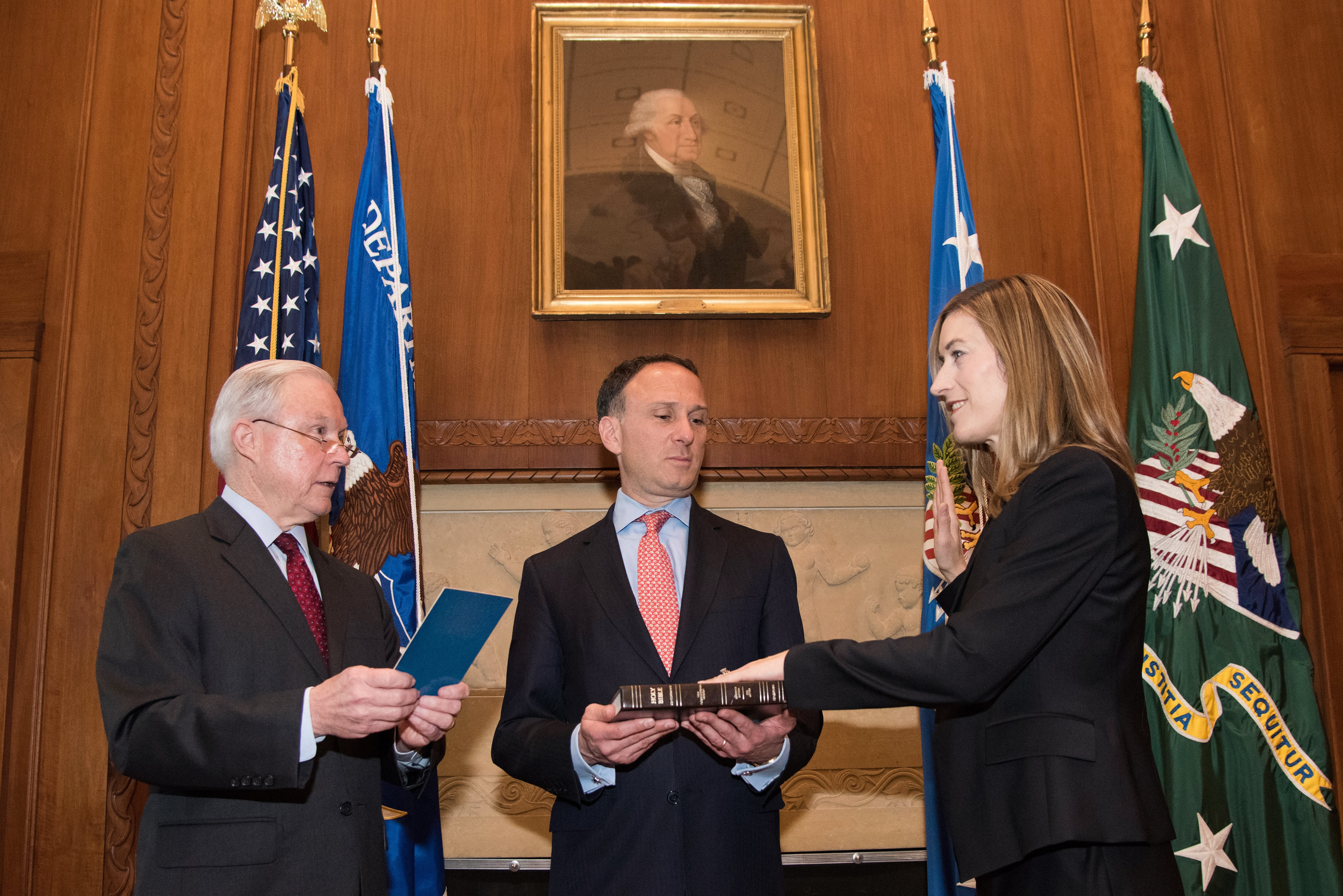
Brand being sworn in as United States Associate Attorney General by Attorney General Jeff Sessions in May 2017

On February 1, 2017, President Donald Trump nominated Brand to be United States Associate Attorney General. Her appointment was confirmed 52–46 by the U.S. Senate on May 18, 2017, and she was sworn in on May 22, 2017.

The reauthorization of the 702 section of the surveillance law was a job assignment of the subject according to CNN. Combating human trafficking was one of Brand's stated priorities as Associate Attorney General. At the Department of Justice, Brand authored a memorandum entitled "Limiting Use of Agency Guidance Documents In Affirmative Civil Enforcement Cases," which was called the "Brand memo". The document forbade DOJ litigators from bringing enforcement actions based on unenforceable guidance documents.

On February 9, 2018, The New York Times reported that Brand, along with her assistant Currie Gunn, had resigned from the Justice Department. The New York Times reported that Brand oversaw "a wide swath of the Justice Department" and helped lead the department's effort to extend Section 702 of the FISA Amendments Act that "authorizes the National Security Agency's warrantless surveillance program."

=== Walmart ===
On February 12, 2018, NBC News reported that Brand quit the Justice Department over fear she might be asked to oversee the Russia probe and had taken a position with Walmart as executive vice president of global governance and corporate secretary. As executive vice president of global governance, chief legal officer, and corporate secretary, Brand is in charge of the legal department, global ethics, compliance, and investigations. In September 2025, Walmart announced Brand's plan to depart Walmart on January 31, 2026.

=== Other professional activities ===
Brand has served as Chief Counsel for Regulatory Litigation at the U.S. Chamber of Commerce. As Chief Counsel with the Chamber, Brand was on the brief for respondent Noel Canning in the landmark Supreme Court decision NLRB v. Noel Canning.

Brand formerly served as the chairman of the Federalist Society's Litigation Practice Group and as co-chair of the American Bar Association Administrative Law Section's Government Information and Right to Privacy Committee.

== Policy positions ==
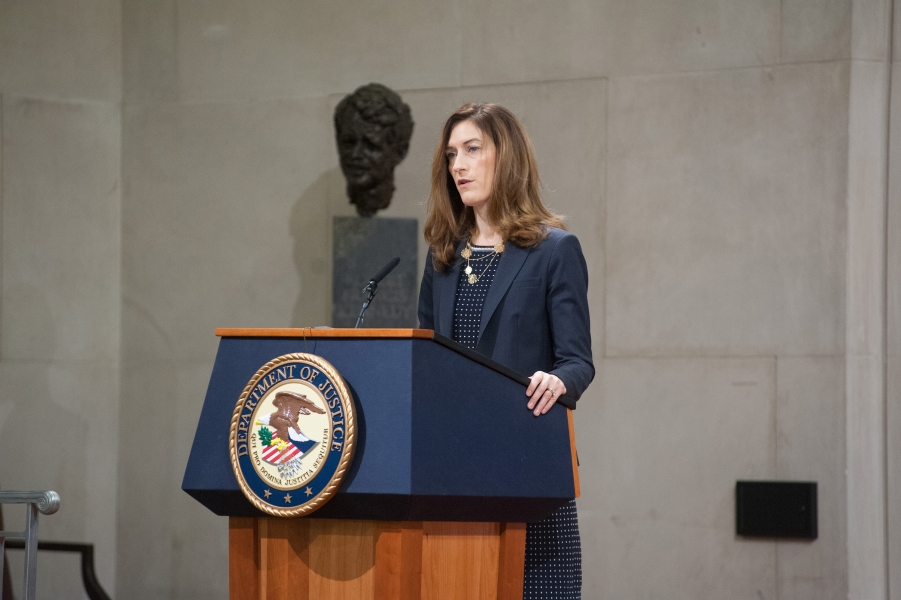
Brand speaking on the Department of Justice's efforts to combat human trafficking in February 2018

In 2015, Brand expressed support for revised guidelines issued by Director of National Intelligence James Clapper, arguing that they represented a welcome shift in the intelligence community away from what she termed its historical "reflexive secrecy." She has also suggested that the National Security Agency ought to develop a set of guidelines beyond the Fair Information Practice Principles, which she alleges are insufficient in the intelligence-gathering context, to govern its own approach to privacy.

In a 2008 publication for The Heritage Foundation, Brand argued against, and proposed various solutions to, what she termed the "over-federalization" of criminal law in the United States.

== See also ==
- List of law clerks for the first seat of the Supreme Court of the United States

Legal offices
Preceded by Daniel Bryant	United States Assistant Attorney General for the Office of Legal Policy; 2005–2007	Succeeded by Elisebeth Cook
Preceded by Tony West	United States Associate Attorney General; 2017–2018	Succeeded by Vanita Gupta
Government offices
Preceded by Francis X. Taylor	Member of the Privacy and Civil Liberties Oversight Board; 2012–2017	Succeeded by Jane Nitze
