= Defense Intel Alumni Association =

Professional organization

The Defense Intel Alumni Association (DIAA) is a non-profit, professional and social networking organization founded by and for civilian and military retirees of the Defense Intelligence Agency (DIA). It also welcomes prospective retirees of DIA. DIAA includes current and retired members of the Federal Government and of the military Services who have been associated with DIA. Since 1998, DIAA has kept members informed about DIA and world events, informed members of the activities, special accomplishments and whereabouts of DIAA members, provided educational services and information, arranged special activities with and in support of DIA, and conducted social activities benefiting the membership.

== History ==
DIAA was developed by retired DIA civilians and incorporated in 1998 with the full support of the then Director of the Defense Intelligence Agency, LTG Patrick Hughes, USA. Since 1998, it has expanded from quarterly luncheons to include monthly forums addressing world topics and developed reciprocal agreements with other intelligence and foreign policy associations.

== See also ==
- Patrick M. Hughes
