= Title 6 of the Code of Federal Regulations =

US title on domestic security

CFR Title 6 – Domestic Security is one of the 50 titles composing the United States Code of Federal Regulations (CFR) and contains the principal set of rules and regulations issued by federal agencies regarding domestic security. It is available in digital and printed form and can be referenced online using the Electronic Code of Federal Regulations (e-CFR).

== Structure ==
The table of contents, as reflected in the e-CFR updated February 4, 2022, is as follows:

Volume	Chapter	Parts	Regulatory Entity
1	I	1–999	Department of Homeland Security, Office of the Secretary
	X	1000–1099	Privacy and Civil Liberties Oversight Board
