= Brian Murphy (intelligence official) =

American law enforcement and intelligence officer

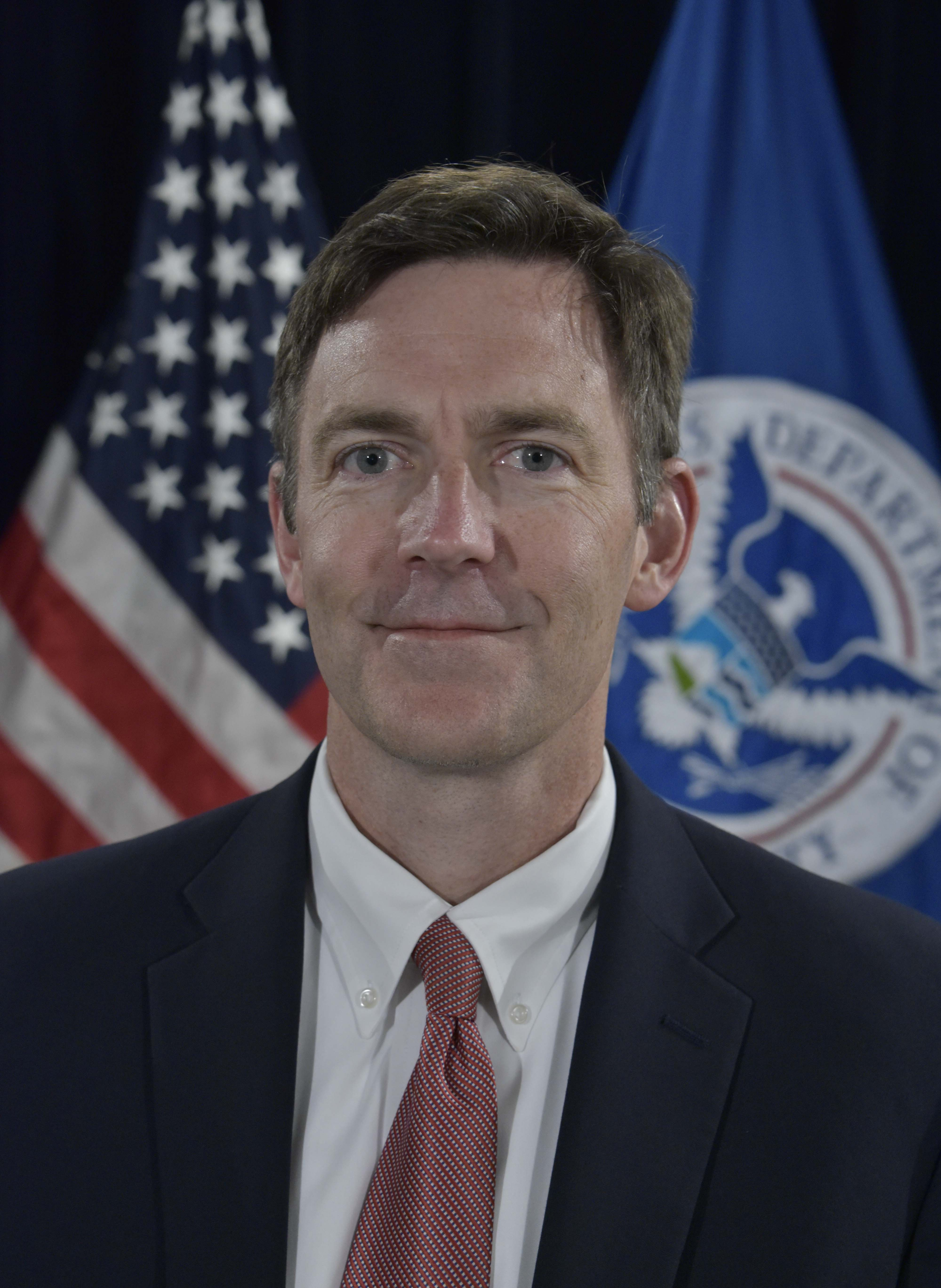
Murphy in 2018

Brian Murphy was the acting United States Under Secretary of Homeland Security for Intelligence and Analysis from May 10, 2020, until August 2, 2020.

== Career ==
Murphy gained a Bachelor of Arts in Government from the College of William & Mary, and a master's degree in Islamic studies from Columbia University. He is a doctoral candidate at Georgetown University. Since leaving government service, he has served as an Affiliate Practice Scholar at the University of Pittsburgh's Institute for Cyber Law, Policy, and Security. He served in the U.S. Marine Corps from 1994 to 1998 as an infantry officer. Murphy began his FBI career in 1998 and worked there for 20 years, culminating in a position responsible for the FBI's national level counterterrorism programs. As a junior special agent assigned to the FBI's New York Field Office his work in counterterrorism were noted in an Esquire article called Brian Murphy V. The Bad Guys Murphy was also a leading counterterrorism investigator who focused on illicit financing. He led an FBI investigation called Blackbear. The Blackbear illicit counterterrorism case was among the first of its kind in the post 9-11 environment.

Murphy took a leave of absence from the FBI and was called back to active duty as a Marine Officer. As an infantry officer, Murphy served with a Marine reserve infantry battalion 2/24 in Iraq in 2004. He later moved to DHS as the Principal Deputy for Intelligence and Analysis, and in May 2020 became Acting Under Secretary for the Office of Intelligence and Analysis. He was temporarily reassigned from that position two months later after it was alleged his office had compiled dossiers of public information about journalists who were reporting on the George Floyd protests.

Murphy has appeared as an expert witness on both international and domestic terrorism.

== Whistleblower complaint ==
Murphy filed a whistleblower complaint in September 2020 alleging episodes of misconduct by top DHS officials. Murphy asserted that DHS secretary Chad Wolf and his deputy Ken Cuccinelli instructed him “to modify intelligence assessments to ensure they matched up with the public comments by President Trump on the subject of ANTIFA and 'anarchist' groups” and to downplay the threat posed by white supremacists. Murphy stated he declined to comply. Murphy also claimed Wolf told him to "cease providing intelligence assessments on the threat of Russian interference in the US, and instead start reporting on interference activities by China and Iran.” Murphy said Wolf told him this directive came from White House national security advisor Robert O'Brien.

He had also submitted prior complaints. In early 2020, he had submitted six internal complaints to the Office of the Director of National Intelligence about the way the intelligence program was addressing Russian disinformation. He had also filed two Office of the Inspector General reports about “attempted censorship of intelligence analysis.”

In June 2020, the "BlueLeaks" hack exposed documents from I&A and other law enforcement agencies; The Intercept's analysis found that leaked materials showed "glaring disparities" in how agencies depicted threats from the far right versus antifa, which the outlet said corroborated Murphy's subsequent allegations.

Days before his September 2020 complaint, ABC News reported that DHS had withheld an intelligence bulletin warning of Russian efforts to promote "allegations about the poor mental health" of Joe Biden. Wolf said the bulletin was "delayed" for quality reasons; Murphy alleged Wolf told him it should be "held" because it "made the President look bad." A revised bulletin was released September 8, 2020, after media coverage of the delay. A May 2022 DHS Inspector General report found that Wolf "participated in the review process multiple times despite lacking any formal role," that the product's scope was changed "based in part on political considerations," and that the changes "put [I&A] at risk of creating a perception of politicization." DHS called the findings evidence of "inappropriate interference" by the prior administration.

Murphy's September 2020 complaint also alleged that former Secretary Kirstjen Nielsen provided false congressional testimony about the number of known or suspected terrorists crossing the southern border. His attorney issued a clarification two days later, retracting the claim that Nielsen gave false testimony to Congress but maintaining that inflated figures were presented at a White House meeting she led. Nielsen's attorney called the allegations "demonstrably false."

Murphy also alleged the threat from right wing domestic extremists was substantial, but he received pressure not to reveal the results. On January 6, 2021, the Capitol was overrun by extremists who were part of a right wing mob. Many reporters noted Murphy's intelligence predictions and the January 6 incident.

The March 2021 ODNI Intelligence Community Assessment found that Russia had conducted influence operations to support Trump's reelection, while China had not deployed interference efforts. An ODNI ombudsman report found "undue influence" on election intelligence analysis during the Trump administration, with political appointees and career analysts clashing over the assessments.

In June 2025, FBI Director Kash Patel declassified August 2020 FBI documents alleging Chinese plans to produce fraudulent driver's licenses for mail-in ballots; NBC News called the allegations "unsubstantiated" and based on an uncorroborated tip from a confidential source.

In July, 2021 it was revealed the DHS Inspector General's Office had interfered in the investigation into Murphy's claims. An independent watch dog, the Project On Government Oversight, revealed in a seven-page report that the DHS Inspector General, Joseph V. Cuffari, manipulated the investigation in an effort to disrupt the investigation into Murphy's claims. The report states Murphy was cleared in January 2021 of any wrongdoing by the rank and file IG staff, however, the Inspector General blocked the release of the conclusions. The report and a NY Times article further explain the improper interference was conducted for political purposes. The Inspector General and other senior staff at the IG's office attempted to protect Wolf and Cuccinelli from being investigated. The article indicates the whistleblower allegations related to Russia and White Supremacy were among the causes for the improper intervention. Both articles state if Murphy had not been wrongfully removed in September 2020 there is evidence DHS would have been in a position to detect the insurrection at the U.S. Capitol on January 6, 2021.

According to the Wall Street Journal, Murphy had asked for substantial resource enhancements in 2019 and early 2020 to combat a growing disinformation threat from Russia and an emerging White Supremacy threat. His requests were denied by Wolf and Cuccinelli. After Murphy's reassignment in July 2020, Joseph Maher, the principal deputy general counsel who had served at DHS since 2003, became acting undersecretary for intelligence and analysis. Murphy's attorney, Mark Zaid, alleged that Maher "immediately shut down open-source collection efforts on domestic extremists" and was involved in retaliation against Murphy.

In October 2020, Maher issued a memo requiring DHS leadership approval for open-source intelligence reports on "election-related threats," citing First Amendment concerns. The House January 6 Committee, which later hired Maher as a senior staffer on the recommendation of Representative Liz Cheney, defended him, stating he "was asked to step into the leadership position" after Murphy's reassignment "following reporting raising concerns that the office had been improperly assembling intelligence on journalists."

== DHS internal review ==
In October 2022, Senator Ron Wyden released an unredacted version of a DHS internal review of I&A's Portland operations. The review found that Murphy had created a "toxic work environment" at I&A through "demeaning, dismissive, and degrading treatment of employees." The review also found that Murphy had ordered analysts to use the term "Violent Antifa Anarchists Inspired" despite the lack of intelligence supporting such a characterization, which "may have adversely colored finished intelligence products over time." The review found "significant irregularities" in the practice of creating dossiers on persons arrested for offenses "seemingly unrelated to homeland security," and recommended that "DHS leadership should strongly consider ensuring that Mr. Murphy not return to lead I&A in any capacity." The review noted that while Murphy had pushed back on requests from Wolf and Cuccinelli to create dossiers on all protesters, limiting collection to those who were arrested, some issues at I&A predated his appointment.
