= Matthew Kozma =

American politician

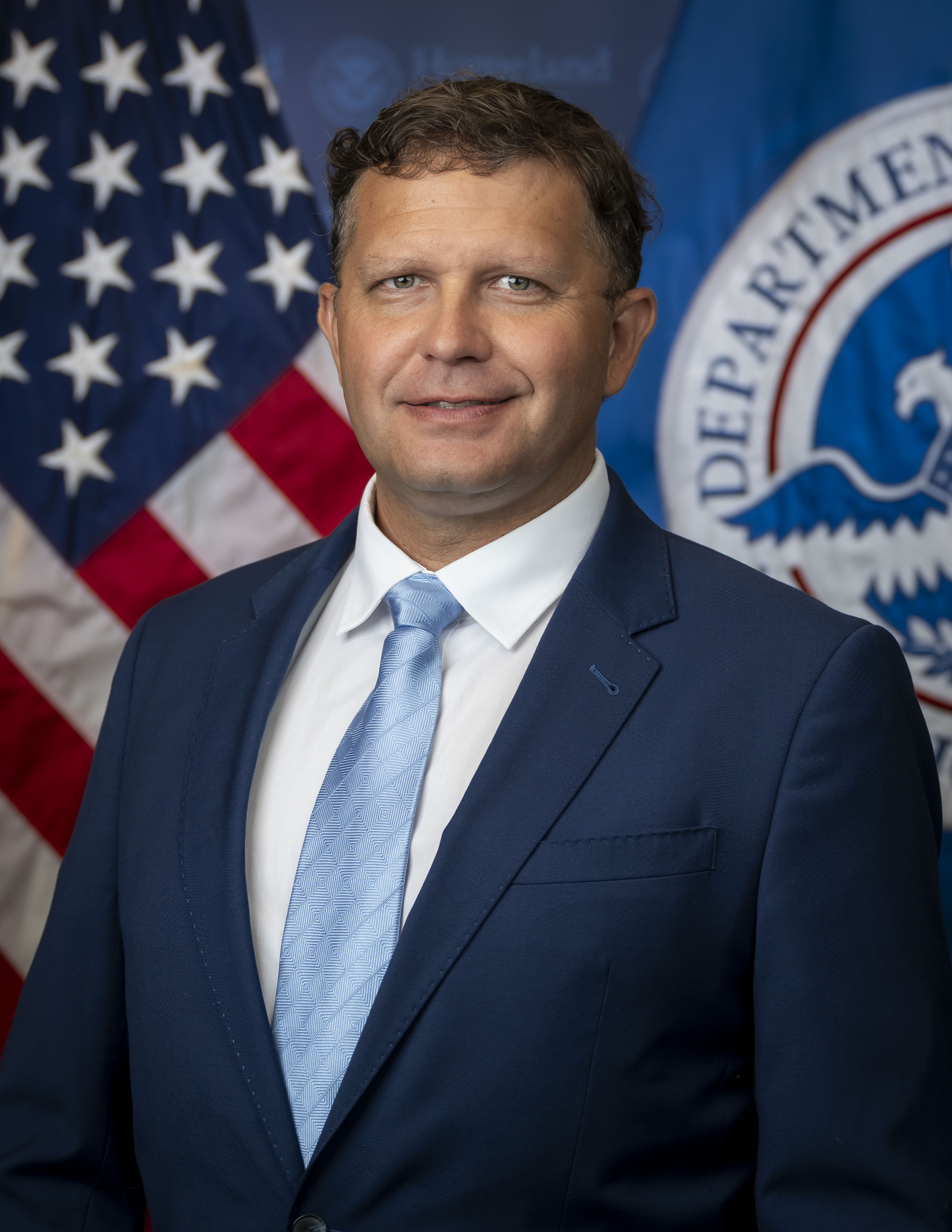
- Official portrait, 2025

Under Secretary of Homeland Security for Intelligence and Analysis
- Incumbent
- Assumed office October 27, 2025
- President: Donald Trump
- Preceded by: Kenneth L. Wainstein

Personal details
- Born: July 19, 1973 (age 53) Neptune City, New Jersey, U.S.
- Education: United States Air Force Academy; UCCS

Military service
- Branch/service: United States Air Force; United States Air Force Reserve
- Years of service: 1995-2001 (active); 2001-2022 (reserve)

Matthew Kozma (July 19, 1973), is a government official in the U.S. Department of Homeland Security, serving as Under Secretary for Intelligence and Analysis and leading the DHS Office of Intelligence and Analysis.

== Early life and career ==
Kozma was born in Neptune City, New Jersey on July 19, 1973. He graduated from the U.S. Air Force Academy in 1995 with a double major in electrical engineering and applied physics. He was on active duty with the Air Force during 1995–2001, and earned an MS in electrical engineering from the University of Colorado Colorado Springs in 1998.

Beginning in 2001, he served in the Air Force Reserve as a Individual Mobilization Augmentee, during which time he held positions at the National Reconnaissance Office and National Geospatial-Intelligence Agency. He earned an MBA from American University Kogod School of Business in 2005. During 2016–2022, he served as Executive Agent for two joint defense acquisition activities, Unified Platform and Joint Cyber Command and Control. He eventually retired with the rank of Colonel after a 25-year career in the Air Force.

== Trump administration ==
He was appointed Intelligence Community Chief Information Officer in the Office of the Director for National Intelligence in September 2020, near the end of the first Trump administration. He served until January 20, 2021.

Kozma worked in the private sector during 2021–2025, including at Intel. In 2023, Kozma was a contributor to Project 2025's Mandate for Leadership publication.

He was confirmed 53–44 by the U.S. Senate as Under Secretary for Intelligence and Analysis on July 31, 2025. Kozma's testimony to the Senate was criticized by Spencer Reynolds in Just Security for stating that there were exceptions to long-standing rules preventing the agency from accessing private communications without identifying themselves as government agents.
