= Implementing Recommendations of the 9/11 Commission Act of 2007 =

United States federal law

- Other short titles: 9/11 Commission International Implementation Act of 2007; Advance Democratic Values, Address Nondemocratic Countries, and Enhance Democracy Act of 2007; Federal Agency Data Mining Reporting Act of 2007; Improving Emergency Communications Act of 2007; National Transit Systems Security Act of 2007; Secure Travel and Counterterrorism Partnership Act of 2007
- Long title: An Act to provide for the implementation of the recommendations of the National Commission on Terrorist Attacks Upon the United States.
- Nicknames: ADVANCE Democracy Act of 2007
- Enacted by: the 110th United States Congress
- Effective: August 3, 2007

Citations
- Public law: 110-53
- Statutes at Large: 121 Stat. 266

Codification
- Titles amended: 6 U.S.C.:Domestic Security
- U.S.C. sections amended: 6 U.S.C. ch. 1 § 101

Legislative history
- Introduced in the House as H.R. 1 by Bennie Thompson (D–MS) on January 5, 2007; Committee consideration by House Homeland Security, House Energy and Commerce, House Judiciary, House Intelligence (Permanent Select), House Foreign Affairs, House Transportation and Infrastructure, House Oversight and Government Reform, House Ways and Means, Senate Homeland Security and Governmental Affairs, Senate Commerce, Science, and Transportation, Senate Judiciary; Passed the House on January 9, 2007 (299-128 Roll call vote 015, via Clerk.House.gov); Passed the Senate on July 9, 2007 (passed unanimous consent); Reported by the joint conference committee on July 25, 2007; agreed to by the Senate on July 26, 2007 (85-8 Roll call vote 284, via Senate.gov) and by the House on July 27, 2007 (371-40 Roll call vote 757, via Clerk.House.gov); Signed into law by President George W. Bush on August 3, 2007

The Implementing Recommendations of the 9/11 Commission Act of 2007 (Pub. L. 110–53 (text) (PDF)), is an Act of Congress. The Act implements some of the recommendations of the 9/11 Commission including mandating 100% inspection of all air and sea cargo entering the United States, and a new method of redistributing anti-terrorism funding.

The bill also authorized the creation of Fusion Centers.

== Legislative history ==
The bill passed the House on January 9, 2007, by a vote of 299-128-8. It later passed the Senate with an amendment by unanimous consent. The two chambers of Congress went to conference, and a conference report in which the bill was amended and renamed the Improving America's Security Act of 2007 passed the Senate 85-8-7 on July 26, 2007, and the House 371-40-22 the following day. It was signed into law by President George W. Bush on August 3, 2007. It became Public Law 110–53. Andrew Weis, senior counsel, led the drafting of the legislation.

The private sector preparedness requirements in the bill were based on the work commissioned by the Sloan Foundation to draft a framework for voluntary preparedness.

=== Short titles ===
- Implementing Recommendations of the 9/11 Commission Act of 2007
- Improving America's Security Act of 2007
- 9/11 Commission International Implementation Act of 2007
- Advance Democratic Values, Address Nondemocratic Countries, and Enhance Democracy Act of 2007 or the ADVANCE Democracy Act of 2007
- Federal Agency Data Mining Reporting Act of 2007
- Improving Emergency Communications Act of 2007
- National Transit Systems Security Act of 2007
- Secure Travel and Counterterrorism Partnership Act of 2007

== See also ==
- September 11, 2001 attacks
