= Title 6 of the United States Code =

U.S. federal statutes on domestic security

Title 6 of the United States Code is a non-positive law title of the United States Code that governs Domestic Security.

== Title 6 — Domestic Security ==
Title 6 has six chapters:

- 6 U.S.C. ch. 1 — Homeland Security Organization (§§ 101–612)
  - United States Department of Homeland Security
- 6 U.S.C. ch. 2 — National Emergency Management (§§ 701–811)
- 6 U.S.C. ch. 3 — Security and Accountability for Every Port (§§ 901–1003)
- 6 U.S.C. ch. 4 — Transportation Security (§§ 1101–1208)
- 6 U.S.C. ch. 5 — Border Infrastructure and Technology Modernization (§§ 1401–1405)
- 6 U.S.C. ch. 6 — Cybersecurity (§§ 1501–1533)

== History ==
From the first edition of the United States Code in 1926 to 1947, Title 6 was a non-positive law title. In 1947, Congress enacted Title 6 as a positive law title. Title 6 had the title heading "Official and Penal Bonds" prior to its enactment as positive law and after its 1947 enactment as positive law until 1972 when it was given a new heading, "Surety Bonds," by an Act of Congress. When Congress enacted title 31 as positive law in 1982, the remaining provisions of Title 6 were transferred to Chapter 93 of Title 31 and Title 6 was officially repealed.

The first edition of the U.S. Code or supplement thereof, in which Title 6 appeared with the heading of "Domestic Security," was the second supplement of the 2000 Edition of the U.S. Code. This supplement was published in 2004 and contained "the additions to and changes in the general and permanent laws of the United States enacted during the One Hundred Seventh Congress, Second Session." At the end of 107th Congress, the only law editorially classified to Title 6 was the Homeland Security Act of 2002.
