= DHS Office of Intelligence and Analysis =

US Department of Homeland Security office

Office of Intelligence and Analysis
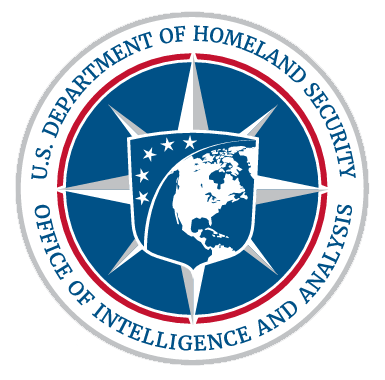
- Seal of I&A

Agency overview
- Formed: 2007
- Jurisdiction: United States
- Headquarters: Nebraska Avenue Complex, Washington, D.C., US
- Employees: Classified
- Agency executive: Matthew Kozma, Under Secretary
- Parent department: Department of Homeland Security

The Office of Intelligence and Analysis (I&A) is the civilian national intelligence component of the United States Department of Homeland Security and one of two statutory members of the United States Intelligence Community (IC) within DHS, the other being Coast Guard Intelligence. It is the only member of the IC tasked with providing intelligence to state, local, tribal and territorial (SLTT) governments, and private sector entities, and developing national intelligence products from information collected by SLTT entities.

I&A leads the Department of Homeland Security Intelligence Enterprise (DHS-IE), an activity which includes seven centers, more than 75 fusion centers across the United States, and intelligence units from DHS field and headquarters components.

I&A is led by the under secretary for intelligence and analysis, a Senate-confirmed position that is dual-hatted as the department's chief intelligence officer (CINT).

== Overview ==
DHS and I&A were established in the wake of the September 11 attacks to address some of the fundamental national security challenges and information sharing gaps identified by the 9/11 Commission. I&A was originally established by the Homeland Security Act of 2002 as the Directorate for Information Analysis and Infrastructure Protection. It was not until the Implementing Recommendations of the 9/11 Commission Act of 2007 that I&A was formally created as the first federal agency statutorily mandated to share information at the state and local level.

== Organizational structure ==
- Office of Intelligence and Analysis
  - Under Secretary of Homeland Security for Intelligence and Analysis
    - Principal Deputy Under Secretary for Intelligence and Analysis
      - Deputy Under Secretary for Analysis
        - Counterterrorism
        - Cyber
        - Economic Security Mission Center
        - Transborder Security
        - Current and Emerging Threats Center
        - Field Intelligence Directorate
        - Homeland Identities, Targeting and Exploitation Center
      - Deputy Under Secretary for Partnerships
        - Intelligence Enterprise Standards
        - Mission Readiness
        - Chief Information Officer

== DHS Intelligence Enterprise ==
DHS's "Intelligence Enterprise" (IE) is made up of nine "Component Intelligence Programs" (CIPS), each led by a "Key Intelligence Officer" (KIO). The DHS IE is supervised and led by the Under Secretary for Intelligence Analysis under the title "Chief Intelligence Officer" (CINT), and is assisted by the Deputy Chief Intelligence Officer, who serves as the Executive Director of the Intelligence Enterprise Program Office (IEPO). IEPO was established in 2023 as part of I&A's "realignment."

DHS's component intelligence programs include:

- Office of Intelligence & Analysis
- U.S. Customs and Border Protection Intelligence Enterprise (IE)
- Federal Emergency Management Agency Intelligence/Investigations Section (I/I)
- U.S. Immigration and Customs Enforcement Homeland Security Investigations Office of Intelligence
- Secret Service Office of Strategic Intelligence and Information
- Transportation Security Administration Intelligence and Analysis (I&A)
- Cybersecurity & Infrastructure Security Agency
- United States Coast Guard GC-2
- U.S. Immigration and Customs Enforcement Office of Intelligence

== Criticism ==
The Office of Intelligence and Analysis (I&A) has a history of problematic surveillance. In 2020, the I&A authorized "collecting and reporting on various activities in the context of elevated threats targeting monuments, memorials, and statues". The office surveilled protestors at the George Floyd protests in Portland, Oregon In September 2023, Congress considered revoking some of the agency's collection authorities over concerns about overreach. According to Politico, "a key theme that emerges from internal documents is that in recent years, many people working at I&A have said they fear they are breaking the law". In 2025, sexual orientation and gender identity were removed from I&A's list of characteristics that "personnel are prohibited from engaging in intelligence activities based solely on".
