= Rodney S. Scott =

American chief of border patrol

Rodney Scott
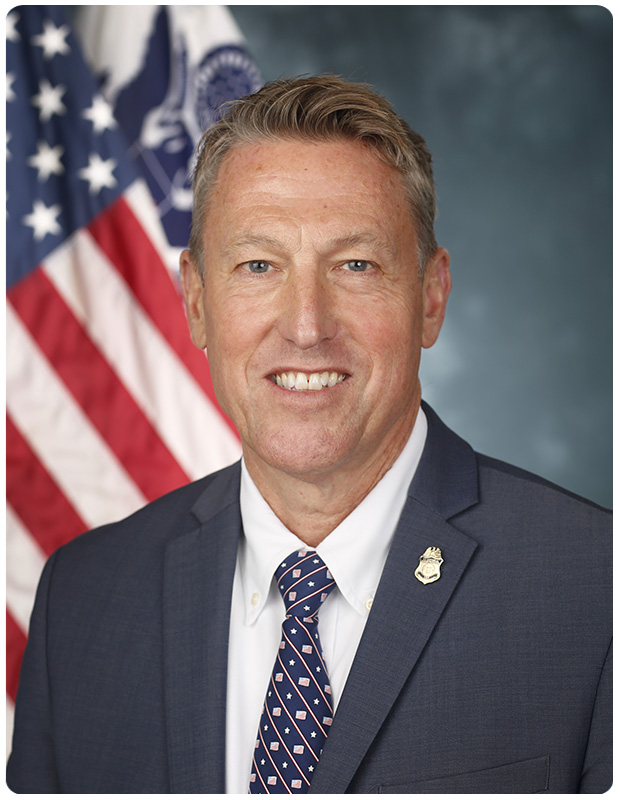

6th Commissioner of U.S. Customs and Border Protection
- Incumbent
- Assumed office June 23, 2025
- President: Donald Trump
- Preceded by: Chris Magnus (2022)

24th Chief of the United States Border Patrol
- In office February 1, 2020 – August 14, 2021
- President: Donald Trump; Joe Biden
- Preceded by: Carla Provost
- Succeeded by: Raúl Ortiz

Personal details
- Spouse: Tandee Scott
- Children: 2
- Website: https://www.bpchiefscott.com/

Rodney S. Scott is an American law enforcement officer who serves as the 6th commissioner of the U.S. Customs and Border Protection in the second Trump administration. He previously served as the 24th chief of the United States Border Patrol from February 2020 to August 2021, in both the first Trump and Biden administrations.

== Career ==
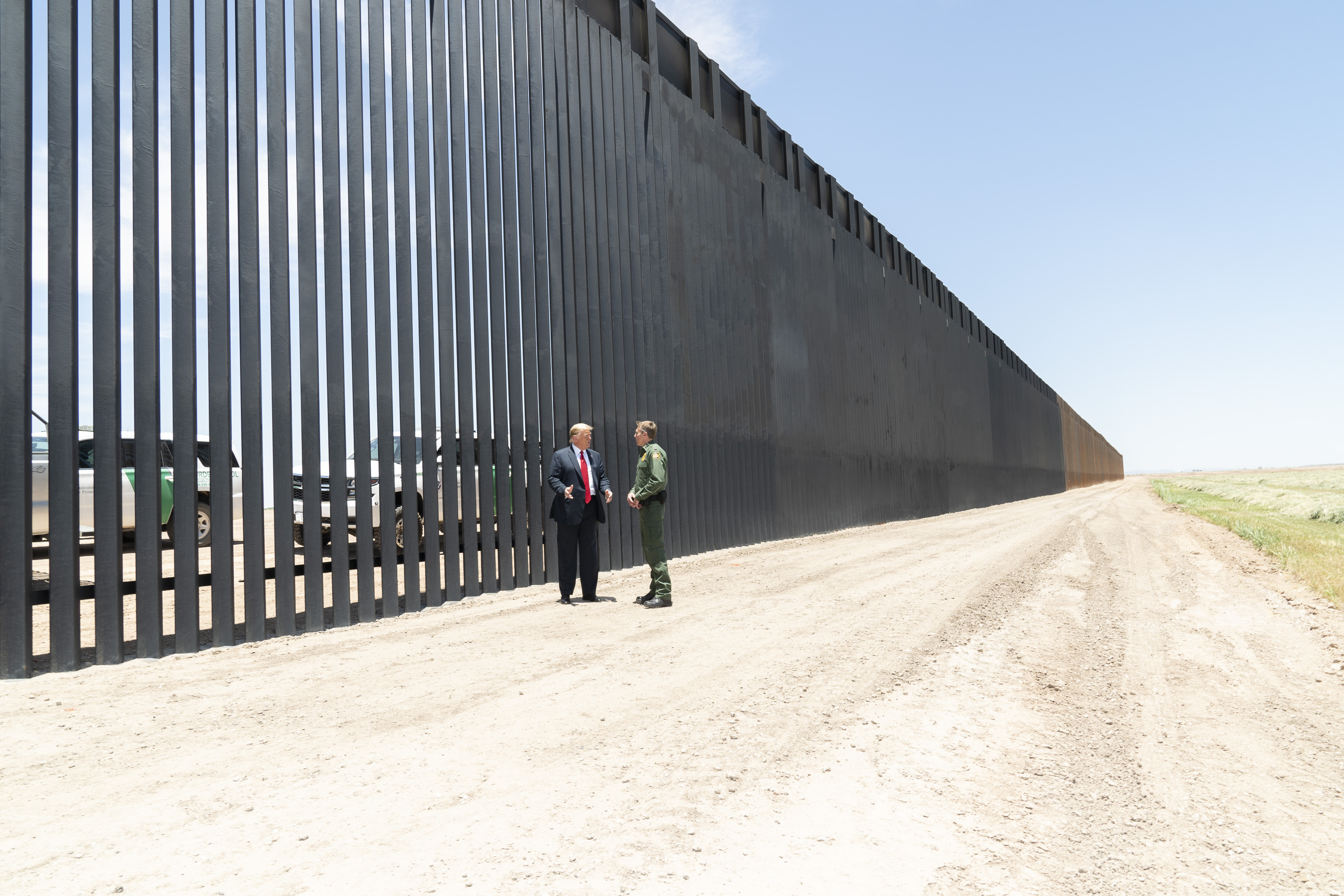
President Trump with Scott at the border wall near Yuma, Arizona, June 2020

Scott joined the U.S. Border Patrol in May 1992, as a member of Academy Class 252. He served in a few leadership positions within the Border Patrol and U.S. Customs and Border Protection (CBP), including chief patrol agent at El Centro Sector in Imperial, California; deputy chief patrol agent San Diego Sector; patrol agent in charge at the Brown Field Station in San Diego, California; assistant chief in CBP's Office of Anti-Terrorism in Washington, D.C.; and division chief and director for the Incident Management and Operations Coordination Division at CBP Headquarters. Prior to his service in the Border Patrol, Commissioner Scott worked as a commercial pilot and studied Aviation Management, earning his Commercial Pilot Certificate from Cochise College. He also graduated from the CBP Leadership Institute and the Naval Postgraduate School Executive Leaders program.

As Chief, Scott supported President Trump's border wall, and although holding a career service position, he became political in his critique of Democrats who favored other ways of addressing illegal aliens. Scott refused to support President Biden's directive to stop using legal words like "illegal alien" in favor of descriptors like "migrant". In June 2021, Scott released a statement saying he had been "given the option to resign, retire or relocate with no rationale provided...so the new administration can place the person they want in the position". Deputy Chief Raul Ortiz succeeded him as interim chief.

After his stint as USBP Chief, Scott joined the Texas Public Policy Foundation, a conservative think tank.

In December 2024, President-elect Donald Trump announced he would nominate Scott to serve as Commissioner of U.S. Customs and Border Protection. In June 2025, the U.S. Senate confirmed Scott by a 51–46 vote. The Center for Immigration Studies supported Scott's confirmation.

== Controversies ==
=== Alleged cover-up of the 2010 death of Anastasio Hernández Rojas ===
Former CBP deputy assistant commissioner James Wong testified that, while Scott was San Diego Sector chief, he "supervised" a Critical Incident Team's handling of Anastasio Hernández Rojas's beating and tasing by Border Patrol agents. Scott allegedly used an administrative subpoena to obtain medical records during an active criminal probe, delayed notifications to local authorities, mishandled evidence, and allowed key video footage to be erased. Although the Justice Department declined to press charges, a wrongful-death suit was settled for $1 million in 2017. Senator Ron Wyden has since subpoenaed DHS records to examine Scott's role.

In April 2025, a San Diego law firm formally petitioned the U.S. attorney general, FBI director, and DHS inspector general to probe Scott for potential violations of the Ethics in Government Act (18 U.S.C. § 207) relating to his post–Border Patrol employment activities and use of official subpoena power during the 2010 Hernández Rojas case.

In investigation by the Inter-American Commission on Human Rights found the CBP agents to be guilty of violating Hernández Rojas's rights, using unnecessary force, and serious flaws in internal investigations.

==== Rape threat tweet ====
In September 2021, Scott sent a tweet to Jenn Budd, a former senior Border Patrol agent and the whistleblower in the Hernández Rojas case. A San Diego County Superior Court judge described that tweet as a "classic" rape threat. During his April 2025 confirmation hearing, Scott apologized for the tweet, calling it a "weak moment" and insisting that he meant to challenge Budd's "creative imagination" about her allegations—an explanation that stunned senators and watchdogs alike.

=== Facebook group ===
Reports surfaced in June 2025 that Scott was part of a closed Border Patrol Facebook group where agents joked about migrant deaths and posted racist and misogynistic memes. Scott claimed to have joined the group in order to keep an eye on what other agents were doing and said that nothing he saw rose to the level of reportable conduct. An internal investigation by CBP found 60 agents to have committed misconduct in the group. He has publicly distanced himself from those posts, saying he never contributed such content.

== Personal life ==
Scott is married and has two daughters. Scott was born in Indiana and raised in Nogales, Arizona. He also lived in Coronado, California, from 1994 to 1997, before moving to Arizona and Washington, D.C., for job assignments. In 2008, Scott and his family moved back to Coronado.

Political offices
Preceded by Carla Provost	Chief of the United States Border Patrol; 2020–2021	Succeeded by Raúl Ortiz
Preceded by Pete R. Flores; Acting	Commissioner of U.S. Customs and Border Protection; 2025–present	Incumbent
