= Matthew Albence =

American government official

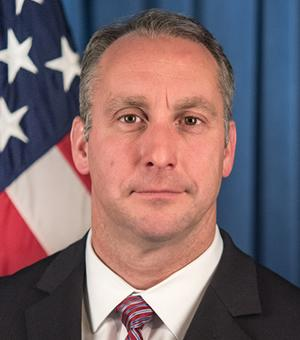

Acting Director of U.S. Immigration and Customs Enforcement
- In office July 5, 2019 – August 25, 2020
- President: Donald Trump
- Deputy: Derek N. Benner (acting)
- Preceded by: Mark A. Morgan (acting)
- Succeeded by: Tony Pham (acting)
- In office April 13, 2019 – May 27, 2019
- President: Donald Trump
- Preceded by: Ronald Vitiello (acting)
- Succeeded by: Mark A. Morgan (acting)

Deputy Director of the U.S. Immigration and Customs Enforcement
- In office August 1, 2018 – July 5, 2019
- President: Donald Trump
- Preceded by: Peter T. Edge
- Succeeded by: Derek N. Benner

Personal details
- Education: American University (BS); Southern Illinois University (MS)

Matthew Albence is an American former law enforcement officer and government official. He served as acting director of U.S. Immigration and Customs Enforcement from April 13, 2019 to May 27, 2019 and from July 5, 2019 to August 25, 2020. During that time, he was a vocal advocate against the reunification of parents and children who had been separated as part of the Trump administration family separation policy.

== Education ==
Albence received a B.S. in Justice and a M.S. in Administration of Justice. He is a member of the Senior Executive Service.

== Career ==
Albence served as ICE's Executive Associate Director for Enforcement and Removal Operations beginning in February 2017, and he was appointed Deputy Director of ICE in August 2018. He became acting director of ICE in April 2019, then was briefly replaced by Mark A. Morgan. Albence reassumed the role of acting director of ICE from July 2019 to August 2020.

Albence played an active role in the Trump administration family separation policy, working to keep separated parents and children apart, in some cases coming up with novel ideas to block reunification, even after the parent had passed through the justice system. Albence expressed concern that parents, after their prosecution, were sometimes being released into the same Border Control stations where their children were held, allowing for reunification. He claimed that this "obviously undermines the entire effort" and advocated for parents to be placed in different holding facilities from their children even after their prosecution. He also pushed for children to be moved out of Border Control stations as quickly as possible to prevent the possibility of reunification. In communications with colleagues, he wrote “Confirm that the expectation is that we are NOT to reunite the families and release."

On July 31, 2020, Albence announced he would resign as ICE's director at the end of August.

Government offices
Preceded by Peter T. Edge	Deputy Director of the U.S. Immigration and Customs Enforcement; 2018–2019	Succeeded by Derek N. Benner
Preceded by Ronald Vitiello; Acting	Director of the U.S. Immigration and Customs Enforcement; Acting; 2019	Succeeded by Mark A. Morgan; Acting
Preceded by Mark A. Morgan; Acting	Director of the U.S. Immigration and Customs Enforcement; Acting; 2019–2020	Succeeded by Tony Pham; Acting
