= Mark A. Morgan =

American law enforcement officer (born 1965 or 1966)

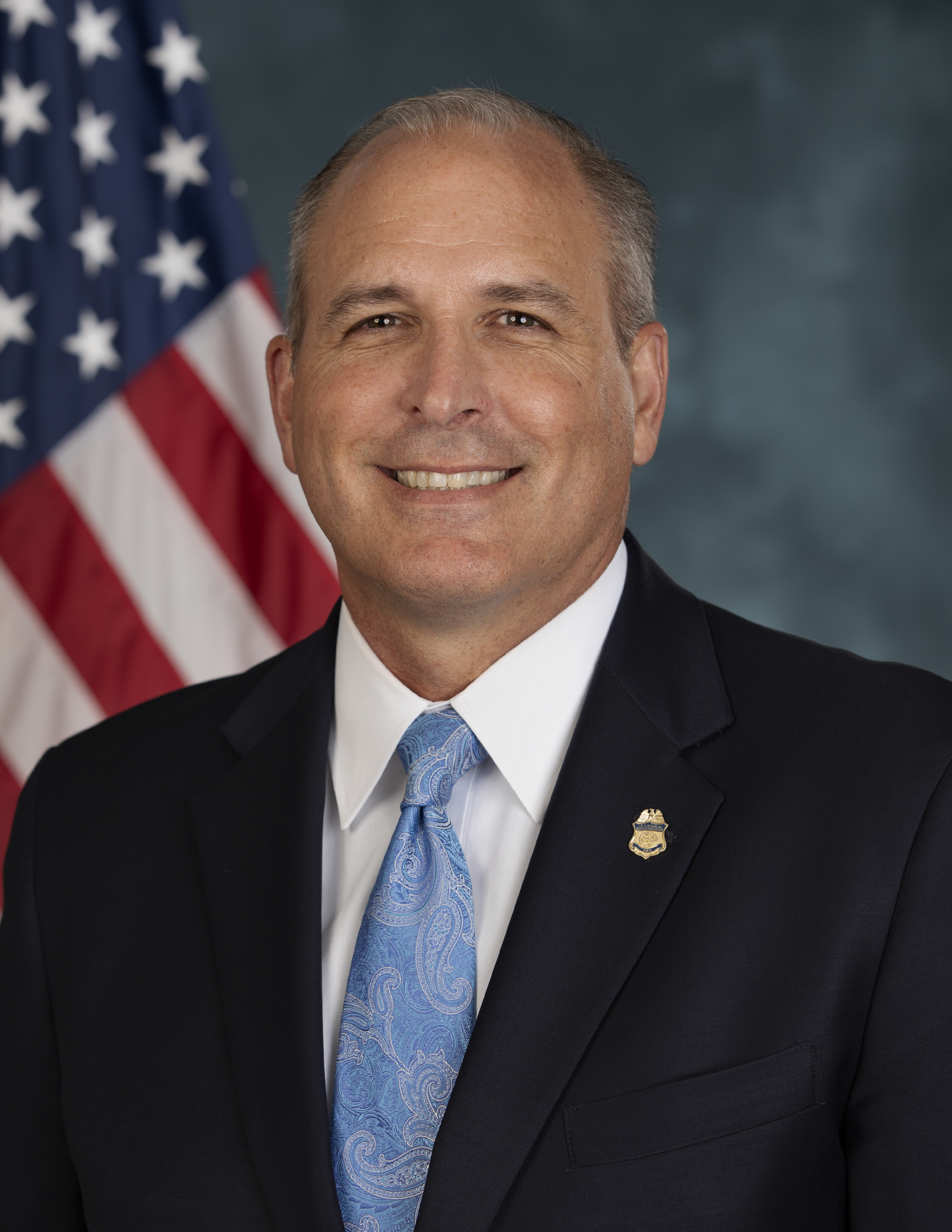

Acting Commissioner of U.S. Customs and Border Protection
- In office July 5, 2019 – January 20, 2021
- President: Donald Trump
- Deputy: Robert Perez
- Preceded by: John P. Sanders (acting)
- Succeeded by: Troy A. Miller (acting)

Acting Director of the U.S. Immigration and Customs Enforcement
- In office May 28, 2019 – July 5, 2019
- President: Donald Trump
- Deputy: Matthew Albence (acting)
- Preceded by: Matthew Albence (acting)
- Succeeded by: Matthew Albence (acting)

Chief of the United States Border Patrol
- In office October 12, 2016 – January 26, 2017
- President: Barack Obama; Donald Trump
- Preceded by: Ronald Vitiello (acting)
- Succeeded by: Ronald Vitiello

Personal details
- Born: 1965 (age 60–61) or 1966 (age 59–60)
- Education: University of Central Missouri (BS); University of Missouri, Kansas City (JD)

Military service
- Branch/service: United States Marine Corps
- Years of service: 1984-1995
- Battles/wars: Gulf War

Mark A. Morgan (born 1965 or 1966) is an American law enforcement official who served as the Chief Operating Officer and Acting Commissioner of U.S. Customs and Border Protection from July 5, 2019, to January 20, 2021.

Morgan had a long career in the Federal Bureau of Investigation, culminating in appointments as head of the Inspection Division and Training Division. He then served as chief of the United States Border Patrol under President Barack Obama as the first person to be appointed to that post from outside the Border Patrol; he resigned a few days after the inauguration of President Donald Trump. Morgan returned to government when he was announced as Trump's pick to be acting director of U.S. Immigration and Customs Enforcement (ICE), where he served from May 28, 2019, until he moved to Customs and Border Protection.

== Early life and education ==
Morgan was born in 1965 or 1966. Morgan received a bachelor of science degree in engineering from Central Missouri State University. He joined the United States Marine Corps at the age of 19, and served active duty and in the United States Marine Corps Reserve for a total of 11 years including service at the Gulf War.

Morgan received a Juris Doctor degree from the University of Missouri–Kansas City School of Law, serving as a deputy sheriff with the Platte County Sheriff's Department in Missouri, and in the Marine Corps Reserve concurrently with his studies.

== Career ==
After graduating from law school, Morgan attended the Los Angeles Police Department Academy and served as a police officer with the Los Angeles Police Department.

=== FBI ===
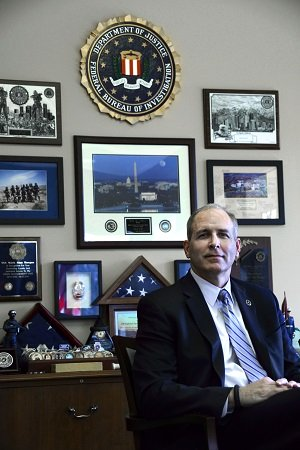
Morgan as FBI Academy head in 2015

Morgan entered on duty as a special agent in 1996 and was assigned to the Los Angeles Field Office. While there, he was a member of the Eurasian Organized Crime Task Force, the Crisis Response Squad, and the Special Weapons and Tactics Team. In 2002, Morgan became a Supervisory Special Agent and served as a Crisis Management Coordinator in the Crisis Management Unit in the Critical Incident Response Group. In 2005, Morgan returned to Los Angeles, where he supervised an FBI-led Hispanic Gang Task Force that focused on the MS-13, and 18th Street gangs. While in Los Angeles, he also supervised the Critical Incident Response Squad, which had administrative and operational oversight of the division's critical incident response resources.

In 2007, Morgan became assistant section chief of the National Center for the Analysis of Violent Crime Branch, where he managed the FBI's Behavioral Analysis Units and the Violent Criminal Apprehension Program. In 2008, he became the FBI's Deputy On-Scene Commander in Baghdad, Iraq, where he was responsible for all FBI personnel deployed to Iraq under the auspices of the Counterterrorism Division. This was his first deployment to a war zone.

In 2009, Morgan was assigned as Assistant Special Agent in Charge of the New Haven Field Office. In 2010, Morgan became Chief of the FBI Strategic Information and Operations Center. From 2011 to 2013, Morgan served as the Special Agent in Charge of the FBI El Paso Division.

During 2013 and 2014, Morgan served as Deputy Assistant Director for the FBI's Inspection Division, which performs compliance and oversight of all FBI operations. In 2014, Morgan served on a detail to U.S. Customs and Border Protection (CBP) in the Department of Homeland Security as the Acting Assistant Commissioner for Internal Affairs. In this role, he oversaw the investigation of criminal and serious administrative misconduct by the CBP workforce. Morgan was assigned to this position after the previous Assistant Commissioner, James F. Tomsheck, was removed for failing to investigate allegations of inappropriate use of force by border agents, and CBP head Gil Kerlikowske took the unusual step of requesting an interim appointment from outside the agency to pursue investigations more aggressively.

In 2014, he was appointed Assistant Director at the FBI Academy in Quantico, Virginia, with responsibility for overseeing policy development and delivery of all law enforcement skills and academic programs for the FBI workforce.

=== Department of Homeland Security ===
==== Chief of U.S. Border Patrol ====
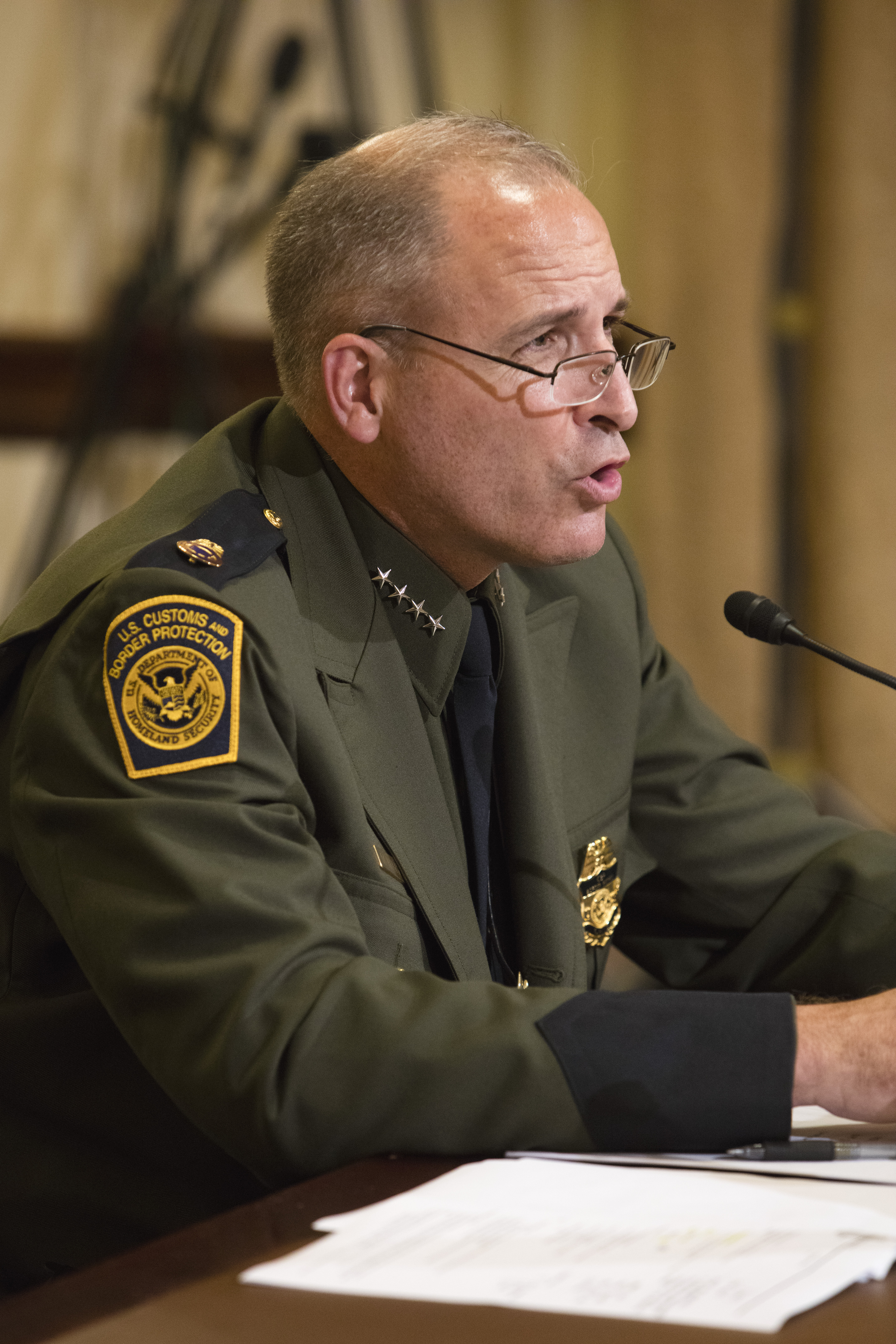
Morgan in September 2016

In June 2016, he was named as the next chief of the U.S. Border Patrol by the Obama administration, and took command in July. Morgan was the first Chief of the Border Patrol to come from outside the agency, and was intended to be a reformer and increase accountability. The appointment was opposed by the Border Patrol's union, the National Border Patrol Council. His decision to wear the Border Patrol uniform was met with some opposition, as he had never been a Border Patrol officer.

On December 1, 2016, Morgan stated in a Senate hearing that he supported a comprehensive immigration overhaul, which was met with strenuous criticism from the National Border Patrol Council. Morgan subsequently clarified that he did not support "blanket amnesty."

On January 26, 2017, just days after President Donald Trump took office, he was forced to resign. He had reportedly desired to stay in his post during the Trump administration, internally criticizing the immigration enforcement policies of the Obama administration after the election.

==== Gap in government service ====
In January 2019, Morgan said that he could determine if an unaccompanied minor would become a member of MS-13, a transnational crime gang known for gruesome violence, just by looking at their eyes.

==== Acting Director of Immigration and Customs Enforcement ====
At the end of April 2019, it was reported that Trump was considering Morgan to take over as head of Immigration and Customs Enforcement. The agency's former acting director, Ronald Vitiello, resigned earlier in April after Trump pulled his nomination for the director's job, telling reporters that he wanted to go with someone "tougher" instead.

On May 5, Trump announced on Twitter that he had chosen Morgan to become the next acting director of ICE. The Washington Post reported that the announcement "caught White House aides and Homeland Security officials by surprise. They had not been informed Morgan was Trump’s choice, and at ICE, senior leaders learned of the decision from the president’s tweet, according to two senior administration officials." Matthew Albence, who had been acting director of ICE since April 2019 and was previously acting deputy director of the agency, continued in that role until Morgan was formally named acting director on May 28, 2019.

He was formally appointed to a newly created position as Principal Deputy Director that outranked the preexisting Deputy Director position. This was criticized as avoiding Senate scrutiny for this position through the normal confirmation process.

==== U.S. Customs and Border Protection ====
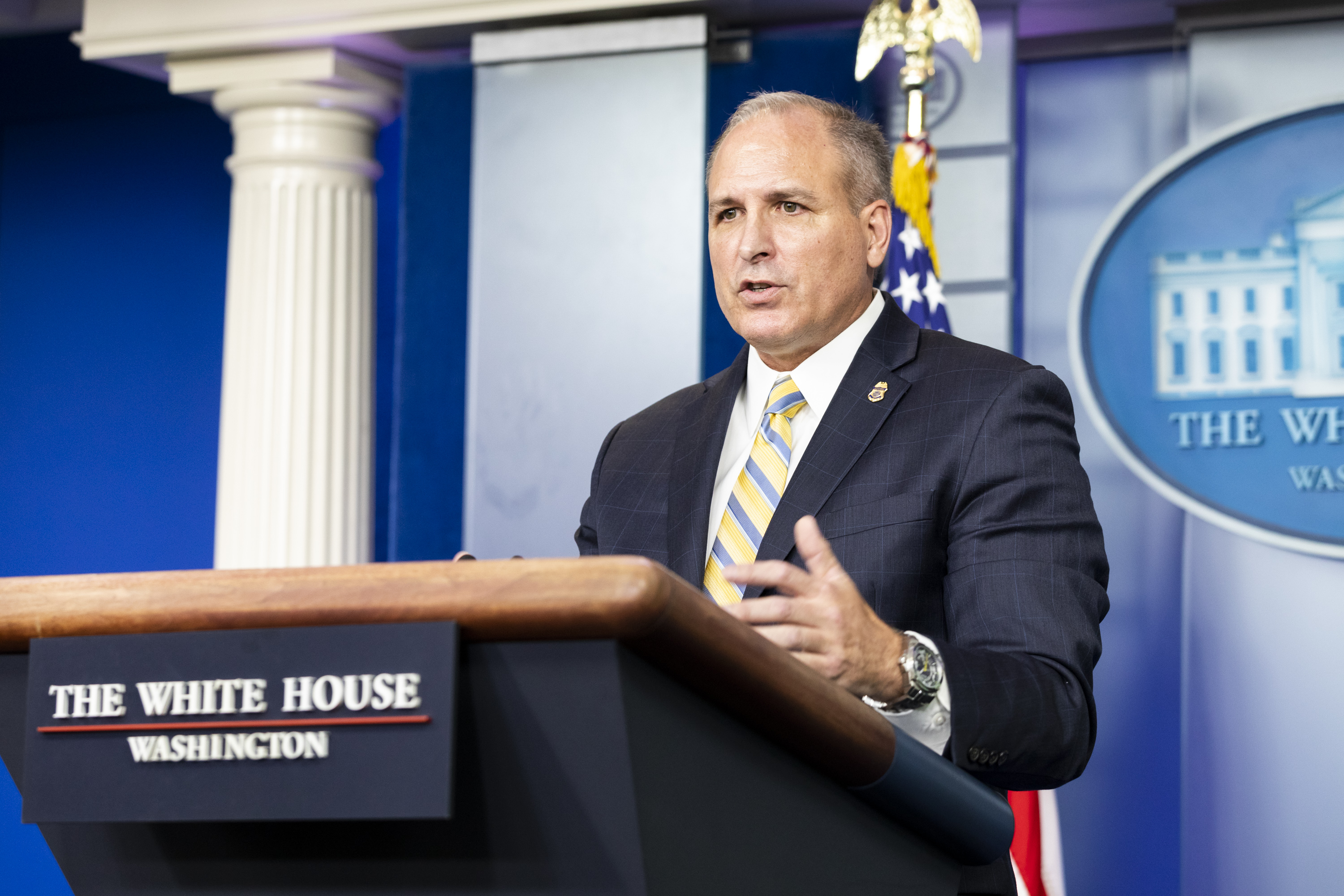
Morgan speaks at a press conference in the James S. Brady Press Briefing Room at the White House in September 2019

On June 27, 2019, the Department of Homeland Security announced that Morgan would become the acting commissioner of U.S. Customs and Border Protection, replacing John Sanders, who had announced his resignation. On July 5, 2019, Morgan became acting commissioner. His formal appointment was as Chief Operating Officer of the agency. Since his appointment was never confirmed by the Senate and his tenure as acting commissioner exceeded 210 days, he can no longer legally lead the agency. To circumvent the law, his new title is "Senior Official Performing the Duties of the Commissioner of U.S. Customs and Border Protection."

In July 2020, Morgan sent CBP agents dressed in camouflage and tactical gear to Portland, Oregon, where federal agents repeatedly used tear gas and projectile munitions on protestors and shot one peaceful protestor in the face, fracturing his face. Agents also used unmarked vehicles to detain protestors, without identifying themselves as law enforcement. Legal observers called this "abduction" and "kidnapping". Oregon Governor Kate Brown described the actions as "abuse of power," and accused DHS of "provoking confrontation for political purposes." Portland mayor Ted Wheeler said it was "an attack on our democracy." Morgan alleged the protestors were "violent criminals" and defended the practice of CBP officers having no names on their uniforms. The New York Times reported that an internal DHS memo prepared by the top official at DHS prior to the deployment stated that the federal agents in question had not been specifically trained in riot control or mass demonstrations.

Tom Ridge, the first head of the Department of Homeland Security, sharply criticized the deployment, saying "The department was established to protect America from the ever-present threat of global terrorism. It was not established to be the president's personal militia." Ridge, a former governor of Pennsylvania, added that he would not have consented, as a governor, to what took place.

Morgan defended the deployment of officers in military-style uniforms and using unmarked vehicles in a press conference on July 21, saying they had identifying numbers on their shoulders. Former Trump administration DHS spokesman Col. David Lapan disputed that the officers were easy to identify.

In September 2020, Morgan made the unsubstantiated claim that "antifa" was sending organized protestors by plane to cities across the United States to incite violence. When asked to provide evidence for the assertion, Morgan did not.

=== Heritage Foundation and FAIR ===
In February 2021, following the end of the Trump administration, Morgan joined the Heritage Foundation as a visiting fellow and the Federation for American Immigration Reform (FAIR) as a senior fellow. He was mentioned as a possible candidate to the post of United States Secretary of Homeland Security in the second cabinet of Donald Trump.

Political offices
Preceded by Ronald Vitiello; Acting	Chief of the United States Border Patrol; 2016–2017	Succeeded by Ronald Vitiello
Preceded by John P. Sanders; Acting	Commissioner of U.S. Customs and Border Protection; Acting; 2019–2021	Succeeded by Troy A. Miller; Acting
Government offices
Preceded by Matthew Albence; Acting	Director of the U.S. Immigration and Customs Enforcement; Acting; 2019	Succeeded by Matthew Albence; Acting
