= Customs Modernization Act =

The United States Customs Modernization Act (Pub. L. 103–182, 107 Stat. 2057, December 8, 1993), amended title 19 U.S.C. 1508, 1509 and 1510, formally Title VI of the North American Free Trade Agreement Implementation Act, commonly known as the "Mod Act", amended the Tariff Act of 1930 and related laws.

The Mod Act was passed with aim of increasing the voluntary compliance with customs laws and improvements to customs enforcement. It introduced two new customs concepts known as "informed compliance" and "shared responsibility." These concepts are premised on the idea that to maximize voluntary compliance with Customs laws and regulations, the trade community needs to be clearly and completely informed of its legal obligations. Accordingly, the Mod Act imposes a greater obligation on Customs to provide the public with improved information concerning the trade community's responsibilities and rights under Customs and related laws. In addition, both the trade and Customs share responsibility in carrying out import requirements.

The Mod Act has been described as the most sweeping regulatory reform legislation since the U.S. Customs Service (now Customs and Border Protection or CBP) was organized in 1789 and it has become a benchmark for customs authorities around the world.

== Features ==
The principal features of the Mod Act are:

- improvements in customs enforcement generally;
- enhanced regulatory audit procedures;
- clarified drawback authority and new drawback penalties for false drawback claims (previously, U.S. customs laws had no penalties for companies that filed false claims, and as such companies had no incentive to expend the effort to file the claims correctly.);
- the creation of a National Customs Automation Program; and
- the acceptance of reconciliations with respect to prior entry summaries.

Section 637 of the Mod Act amended section 484 of the Tariff Act of 1930 and imposed on importers for the first time a statutory duty to exercise "reasonable care" in providing CBP with accurate and timely classification, appraisement and other data upon importing cargo. CBP then establishes the final classification, appraisement and rate of duty applicable to an imported good based on the importer's data. Importers face penalties for failing to exercise reasonable care.

The Mod Act also contained several amendments to the enforcement powers of CBP.

- To the extent that an importer fails to use reasonable care, Customs may impose Section 592 penalties.
- Section 615 amended section 509 of the Tariff Act, creating new recordkeeping penalties for importers up to $100,000.
- Section 621 amended section 592 to apply existing penalties for false information to information transmitted electronically and allows Customs to recover unpaid taxes and fees resulting from other section 592 violations.

== See also ==
- U.S. Customs and Border Protection
- Entry visibility
- World Customs Organization
- Customs valuation
