= Customs valuation =

Value assessment for import and export

Customs valuation is the process whereby customs authorities assign a monetary value to a good or service for the purposes of import or export. Generally, authorities engage in this process as a means of protecting tariff concessions, collecting revenue for the governing authority, implementing trade policy, and protecting public health and safety. Customs duties, and the need for customs valuation, have existed for thousands of years among different cultures, with evidence of their use in the Roman Empire, the Han dynasty and the Indian sub-continent. The first recorded customs tariff was from 136 in Palmyra, an oasis city in the Syrian desert. Beginning near the end of the 20th century, the procedures used throughout most of the world for customs valuation were codified in the Agreement on Implementation of Article VII of the General Agreement on Tariffs and Trade (GATT) 1994.

== Convention on the Valuation of Goods for Customs Purposes ==
The Convention on the Valuation of Goods for Customs Purposes was adopted in Brussels in 1950 and opened for national signatures on 15 December that year. Annex 1 to the convention set out a definition of value for the purpose of levying customs, which was commonly known as the Brussels Definition of Value (BDV).

== Agreement on Implementation of Article VII of GATT ==
Article VII of the GATT outlines the requirements for Valuation for Customs Purposes, and is applicable to all members of the World Trade Organization. The Agreement on Implementation of Article VII (known as the WTO Agreement on Customs Valuation or the “Valuation Agreement”) ensures that determinations of the customs value for the application of duty rates to imported goods are conducted in a neutral and uniform manner, precluding the use of arbitrary or fictitious customs values.

The Agreement was negotiated during the Tokyo Round, but at that time its acceptance was voluntary. Adherence to the Agreement became mandatory as part of membership in the WTO subsequent to the Uruguay Round. The Agreement is administered by the WTO Committee on Customs Valuation, which holds two formal meetings a year. The Agreement also established a Technical Committee on Customs Valuation, which operates under the auspices of the World Customs Organization (WCO), with a view to ensuring, at the technical level, uniformity in interpretation and application of the Agreement. The Technical Committee also meets twice a year.

The Agreement has four major parts in addition to a preamble and three annexes. Part I sets out substantive rules of customs valuation. Part II provides for the international administration of the Agreement and for dispute resolution. Part III provides for special and differential treatment for developing countries, and Part IV contains the so-called final provisions dealing with matters such as acceptance and accession of the Agreement, reservations, and servicing of the Agreement.

The agreement gives customs administrations the right to request further information of importers where they have reason to doubt the accuracy of the declared value of imported goods. If the administration maintains a reasonable doubt, despite any additional information, it may be deemed that the customs value of the imported goods cannot be determined on the basis of the declared value, and customs would need to establish the value taking into account the provisions of the Agreement.

== Transaction value ==
The primary basis for customs valuation under the Agreement is “transaction value” as defined in Article 1. Article 1 defines transaction value as “the price actually paid or payable for the goods when sold for export to the country of importation.” Article 1 must be read together with Article 8, which lets Customs authorities make adjustments to the transaction value in cases where certain specific parts of the good - considered to be a part of the value for customs purposes - are incurred by the buyer but are not actually included in the price paid or payable for the imported goods. Article 8 also allows for the inclusion in transaction value of exchanges ("considerations") between the buyer and seller in forms other than money. Articles 2 through 7 provide methods of determining the customs value whenever it cannot be determined under the provisions of Article 1.

The methods of customs valuation, in descending order of precedence, are:

1. Transaction Value of Merchandise in Question - price actually paid or payable for the goods sold. (Art. 1)
2. Transaction Value of Identical Merchandise (Art. 2)
3. Transaction Value of Similar Merchandise (Art. 3)
4. Deductive Value (Art. 5)
5. Computed Value (Art. 6)
6. Derivative Method (Art. 7)

In the United States, this hierarchy is codified in domestic legislation.

== See also ==
- Customs Modernization Act
- Uruguay Round Agreements
- WTO Agreements
- General Agreement on Tariffs and Trade
- World Customs Organization
