= Carla Provost =

United States government official

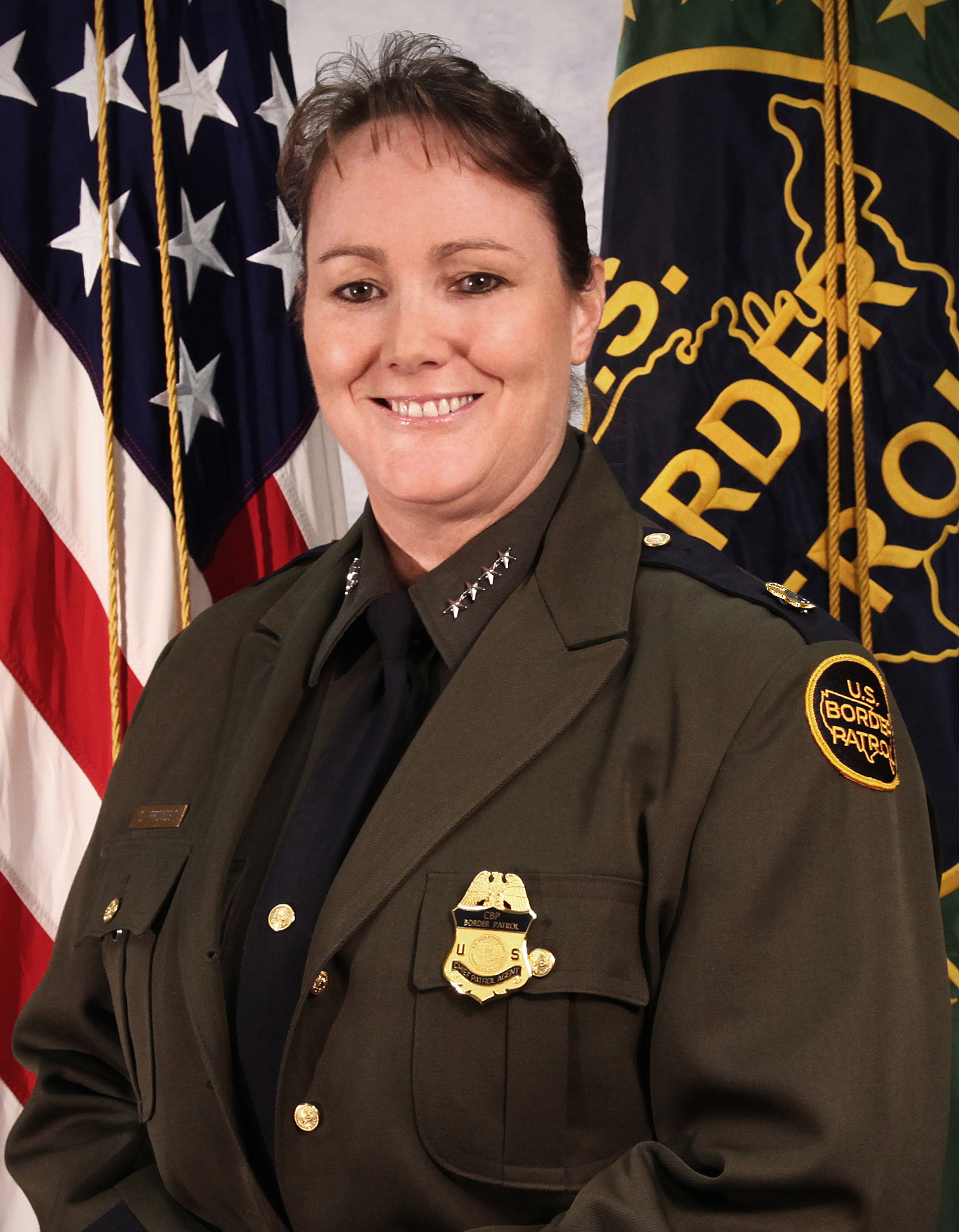

Chief of the United States Border Patrol
- In office April 25, 2017 – January 31, 2020; Acting: April 25, 2017 – August 5, 2018
- President: Donald Trump
- Preceded by: Ronald Vitiello
- Succeeded by: Rodney S. Scott

Personal details
- Born: November 21, 1969 (age 56) Burlingame, Kansas, U.S.
- Children: 1
- Education: Kansas State University (BSS); National Defense University (MS)

Carla L. Provost (born November 21, 1969) is an American retired government official who served as the Chief of the United States Border Patrol from August 2018 through January 2020. She was the first woman to serve as Chief of the Border Patrol, a career law enforcement position. Provost held numerous positions during her 25-year career in the Border Patrol, including serving as Deputy Chief beginning in October 2016, and Acting Chief from April 2017 until her promotion in August 2018.

== Early life and education ==
Carla Provost was born in Burlingame, Kansas. Her father, Max, worked for the Santa Fe Railroad, which became the Burlington Northern Santa Fe. Her mother, Faye, was a paralegal for a law firm before dying from Alzheimer's disease.

Provost graduated from Kansas State University with a Bachelor of Science in sociology and criminal justice; and obtained a Master of Science in national resource strategy from the Industrial College of the Armed Forces at the National Defense University.

== Career ==
Provost was formerly a police officer with the Riley County Police Department in Riley County, Kansas. Provost entered duty with the Border Patrol on January 8, 1995, when the 5,000 member force was 5% female. After starting at the Douglas Station in Douglas, Arizona, she served in a number of senior positions at the Yuma Station in Yuma, Arizona, and El Paso, Texas.

In January 2013, she was given control of operations for the Border Patrol's El Centro Sector in Imperial, California. In September 2015, she was tasked with investigating allegations of wrongdoing and rooting out corruption, becoming Deputy Assistant Commissioner of U.S. Customs and Border Protection's Office of Professional Responsibility.

On October 26, 2016, Provost was selected as the Deputy Chief of the Border Patrol. In April 2017, Provost began serving as Acting Chief after Ronald Vitiello was named Acting Deputy Commissioner of U.S. Customs and Border Protection. Provost was officially promoted to the position of Chief in August 2018, a move widely supported by the Border Patrol workforce.

In July 2019, an investigation was launched into "disturbing social media activity hosted on a private Facebook group that may include a number of CBP employees". Provost said that the "posts are completely inappropriate" and vowed to hold the employees responsible accountable. It was later revealed that Provost herself was once a member of the group, having posted in it in November 2018. In a July 2019 congressional hearing, Provost testified that she was "an infrequent user of Facebook" and first learned of the offensive posts in reporting by ProPublica. Upon hearing of the postings, she provided CBP's Office of Professional Responsibility with full access to her Facebook account for investigation.

Provost retired from federal service in January 2020 after 25 years as a Border Patrol agent. She was awarded a Meritorious Senior Professional Presidential Rank Award. She then served as the director of the Pecos Children's Center, a privately-run emergency shelter in West Texas for migrant children, from March to May 2021. She is currently a contractor for San Antonio-based nonprofit Endeavors.

== Personal life ==
Provost has one child, a daughter.

Political offices
Preceded by Ronald Vitiello	Chief of the United States Border Patrol; 2017–2020; Acting: 2017–2018	Succeeded by Rodney S. Scott
