= United States Customs and Border Protection =

Federal law enforcement agency

U.S. Customs and Border Protection
- CBP Patch

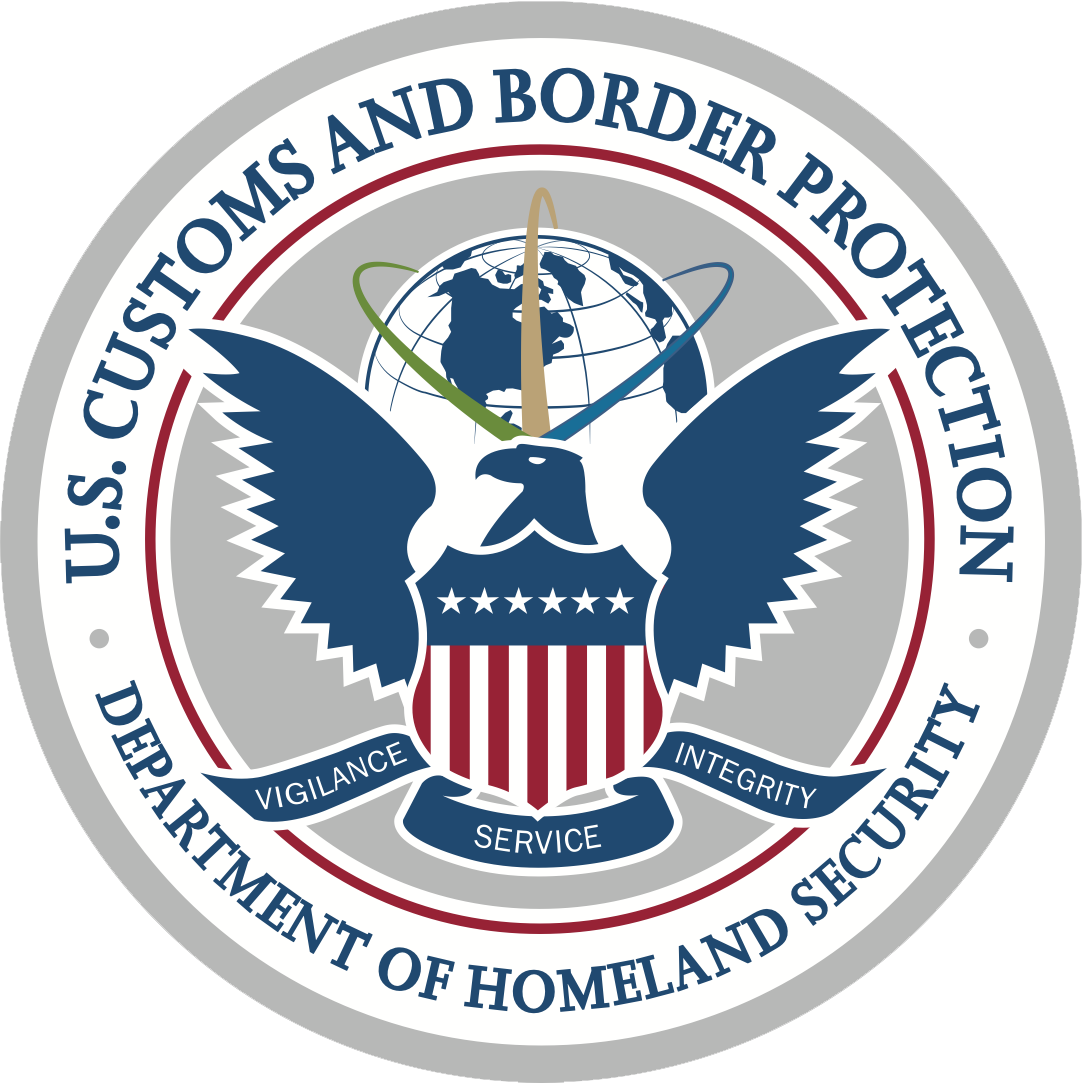
- CBP Seal

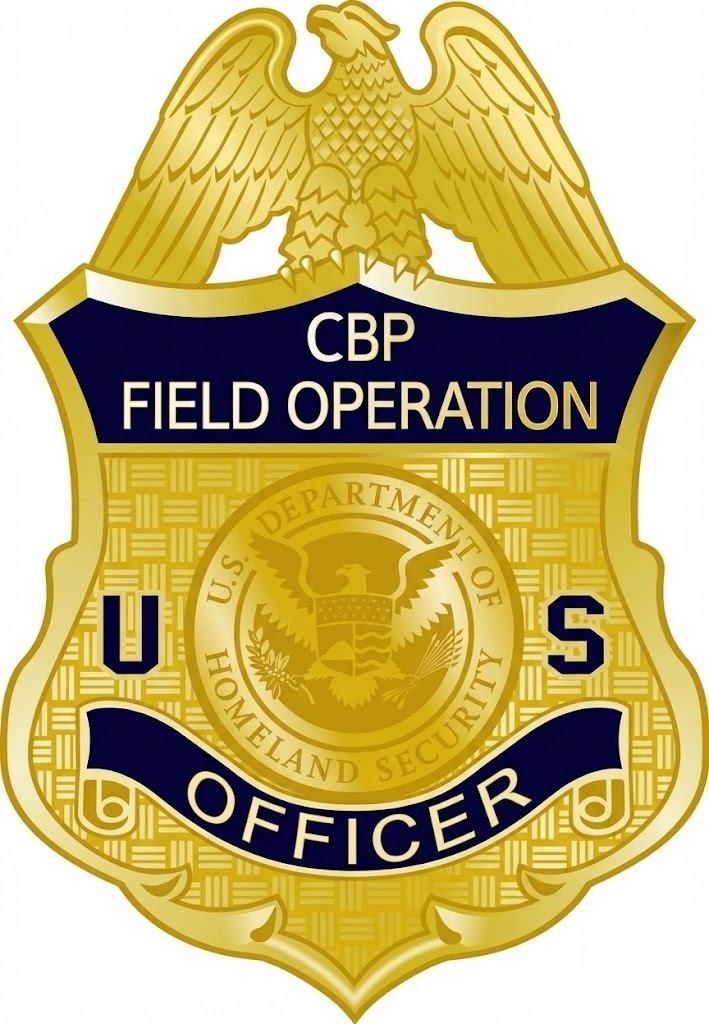
- Badge of a CBP Office of Field Operation

- CBP flag

Agency overview
- Formed: March 1, 2003; 23 years ago
- Preceding agencies: Some functions of the United States Department of Agriculture; Immigration inspectors from Immigration and Naturalization Service and the United States Border Patrol; Functions of the United States Customs Service
- Employees: 69,875+ (2026)
- Annual budget: $23 billion (2026)

Jurisdictional structure
- Federal agency: United States
- Operations jurisdiction: United States
- General nature: Federal law enforcement

Operational structure
- Headquarters: Ronald Reagan Building; Washington, D.C., U.S.
- Federal Law Enforcement Sworn Officers: 45,741
- Agency executives: Rodney S. Scott, Commissioner; Ronald Vitiello, Acting Deputy Commissioner
- Parent agency: United States Department of Homeland Security
- Child agency: United States Border Patrol CBP Office of Field Operations CBP Air and Marine Operations

Website
- cbp.gov

United States Customs and Border Protection (CBP) is the largest federal law enforcement agency of the United States Department of Homeland Security. It is the country's primary border control organization, charged with regulating and facilitating international trade, collecting import duties, as well as enforcing U.S. regulations, including trade, customs, and immigration. The CBP is one of the largest law enforcement agencies in the United States. It has a workforce of more than 45,600 federal agents and officers. It is headquartered in Washington, D.C.

== Organization ==
The CBP has a workforce of over 58,000 employees, including officers and agents, agriculture specialists, aircraft pilots, trade specialists, mission support staff, and canine enforcement officers and agents.

- Approximately 33,300 CBP officers inspect and examine passengers and cargo at 328 ports of entry.
- About 2,200 CBP agriculture specialists work to curtail the spread of harmful pests and plant and animal diseases that may harm America's farms and food supply or cause bio- and agro-terrorism.
- About 21,000 Border Patrol agents protect and patrol 1,900 miles (3,100 km) of border with Mexico and 5,000 miles (8,000 km) of border with Canada.
- Roughly 1,000 air and marine interdiction agents prevent people, weapons, narcotics, and conveyances from illegal entry by air and water.
- Roughly 2,500 employees in CBP revenue positions collect over $30 billion annually in entry duties and taxes through the enforcement of trade and tariff laws. In addition, these employees fulfill the agency's trade mission by appraising and classifying imported merchandise. These employees serve in positions such as import specialist, auditor, international trade specialist, and textile analyst.
- The primary goal of the CBP Canine Program is terrorist detection and apprehension. The CBP Canine Program is critical to the mission of the Department of Homeland Security: "To Protect the Homeland." The program conducts the largest number of working dogs of any U.S. federal law enforcement agency. K-9 teams are assigned to 73 commercial ports and 74 Border Patrol stations throughout the nation.

There are 328 officially designated ports of entry and an additional 14 pre-clearance locations. CBP is also in charge of the Container Security Initiative, which identifies and inspects foreign cargo in its mother country before it is to be imported into the United States. In addition the CBP claims to have legal jurisdiction to conduct some activities up to 100 miles (160 km) inwards from any land or sea border. This can include operating interior checkpoints.

CBP assess all passengers flying into the U.S. for terrorist risk via the Joint Terrorism Task Force (JTTF) and systems such as Advance Passenger Information System (APIS), United States Visitor and Immigrant Status Indication Technology (US-VISIT), and the Student and Exchange Visitor System (SEVIS). CBP also works with the U.S. Food and Drug Administration to screen high-risk imported food shipments in order to prevent bio-terrorism and agro-terrorism.

Through the Container Security Initiative, CBP works jointly with host nation counterparts to identify and screen containers that pose a risk at the foreign port of departure before they are loaded on board vessels bound for the U.S. CSI is implemented in 20 of the largest ports in terms of container shipments to the U.S., and at a total of 58 ports worldwide.

The Secure Electronic Network for Travelers Rapid Inspection (SENTRI) program allows pre-screened, low-risk travelers from Mexico to be processed through dedicated lanes. NEXUS is a similar program on the country's northern border with Canada. Along both borders, CBP has implemented the Free and Secure Trade, which uses transponder technology and pre-arrival shipment information to process participating trucks as they arrive at the border. An agreement with Canada allows CBP to target, screen, and examine rail shipments headed to the U.S.

CBP is authorized to provide aerial surveillance outside of the border area "to assist law enforcement and humanitarian relief efforts" when requested by local, tribal, state or federal agencies. CBP drones have been used to capture images of storm-impacted areas for the National Weather Service; assess hurricane affected areas for FEMA; support immigration enforcement actions by ICE; and provide surveillance for local law enforcement during the 2015 Baltimore protests, the 2020 George Floyd protests, and the 2025 Los Angeles protests.

=== Structure ===
- Commissioner
  - Deputy Commissioner
    - Office of Intelligence
    - Air and Marine Operations
    - Office of Field Operations
    - United States Border Patrol
    - Office of Trade
    - Enterprise Services Office
      - Office of Acquisition
      - Office of Finance
      - Office of Human Resources Management
      - Office of Training and Development
      - Office of Information and Technology
    - Operations Support Office
      - Office of International Affairs
    - Office of Chief Counsel
    - Office of Congressional Affairs
    - Office of Intergovernmental Public Liaison
    - Office of Privacy and Diversity
    - Office of Professional Responsibility
    - Office of Public Affairs
    - Office of Trade Relations

=== List of commissioners of U.S. Customs and Border Protection ===
| No. | Portrait | Commissioner | Took office | Left office | Time in office | Party | President |
|---|---|---|---|---|---|---|---|
| 1 | Robert C. Bonner | Robert C. Bonner (born 1942) | March 1, 2003 | November 25, 2005 | 2 years, 269 days | Republican | George W. Bush (R) |
| – | Deborah Spero | Deborah Spero; Acting | November 25, 2005 | June 2, 2006 | 189 days | ? | George W. Bush (R) |
| 2 | Ralph Basham | Ralph Basham (born 1943) | June 6, 2006 | February 27, 2009 | 2 years, 266 days | ? | George W. Bush (R); Barack Obama (D) |
| – | Jayson Ahern | Jayson Ahern; Acting | February 27, 2009 | March 10, 2010 | 1 year, 11 days | ? | Barack Obama (D) |
| – | Alan D. Bersin | Alan D. Bersin (born 1946); Acting | March 10, 2010 | December 30, 2011 | 1 year, 278 days | Democratic | Barack Obama (D) |
| – | David V. Aguilar | David V. Aguilar (born 1955); Acting | December 30, 2011 | March 30, 2013 | 1 year, 90 days | ? | Barack Obama (D) |
| – | Thomas S. Winkowski | Thomas S. Winkowski (born 1954); Acting | March 30, 2013 | March 7, 2014 | 342 days | ? | Barack Obama (D) |
| 3 | Gil Kerlikowske | Gil Kerlikowske (born 1949) | March 7, 2014 | January 20, 2017 | 2 years, 319 days | Democratic | Barack Obama (D) |
| – | Kevin McAleenan | Kevin McAleenan (born 1971); Acting | January 20, 2017 | March 20, 2018 | 1 year, 59 days | ? | Donald Trump (R) |
| 4 | Kevin McAleenan | Kevin McAleenan (born 1971) | March 20, 2018 | April 11, 2019 | 1 year, 22 days | ? | Donald Trump (R) |
| – | John P. Sanders | John P. Sanders; Acting | April 15, 2019 | July 5, 2019 | 81 days | ? | Donald Trump (R) |
| – | Mark A. Morgan | Mark A. Morgan (born 1965/1966); Acting | July 5, 2019 | January 20, 2021 | 1 year, 199 days | ? | Donald Trump (R) |
| – | Troy A. Miller | Troy A. Miller; Acting | January 20, 2021 | December 13, 2021 | 327 days | ? | Joe Biden (D) |
| 5 | Chris Magnus | Chris Magnus (born 1960) | December 13, 2021 | November 12, 2022 | 334 days | ? | Joe Biden (D) |
| – | Troy A. Miller | Troy A. Miller; Acting | November 12, 2022 | January 20, 2025 | 2 years, 69 days | ? | Joe Biden (D) |
| – | Pete R. Flores | Pete R. Flores; Acting | January 20, 2025 | June 23, 2025 | 154 days | ? | Donald Trump (R) |
| 6 | Rodney S. Scott | Rodney S. Scott | June 23, 2025 | Incumbent | 1 year, 144 days | ? | Donald Trump (R) |

== Enforcement powers ==
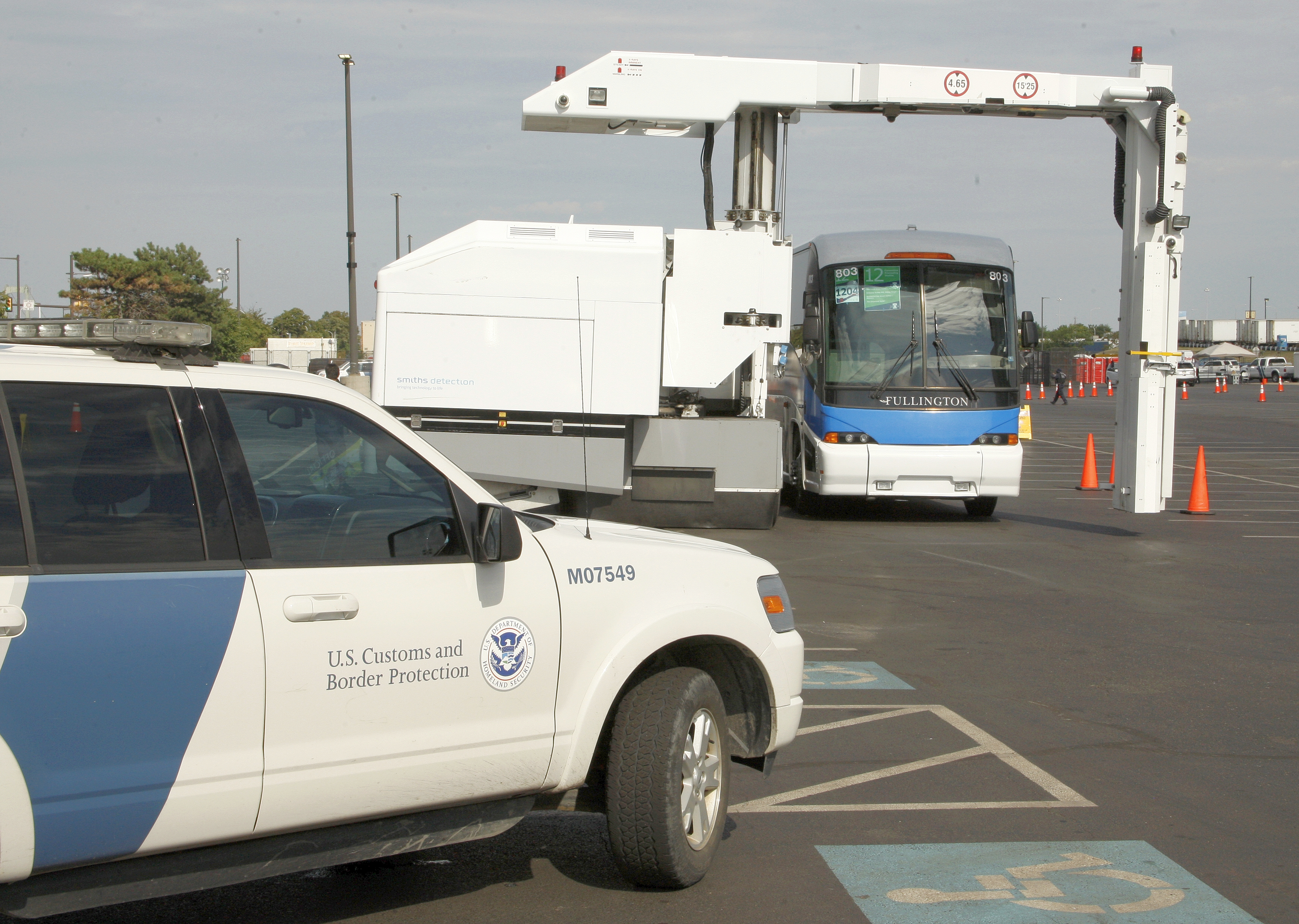
Scanning a delegate bus entering the 2016 Democratic National Convention

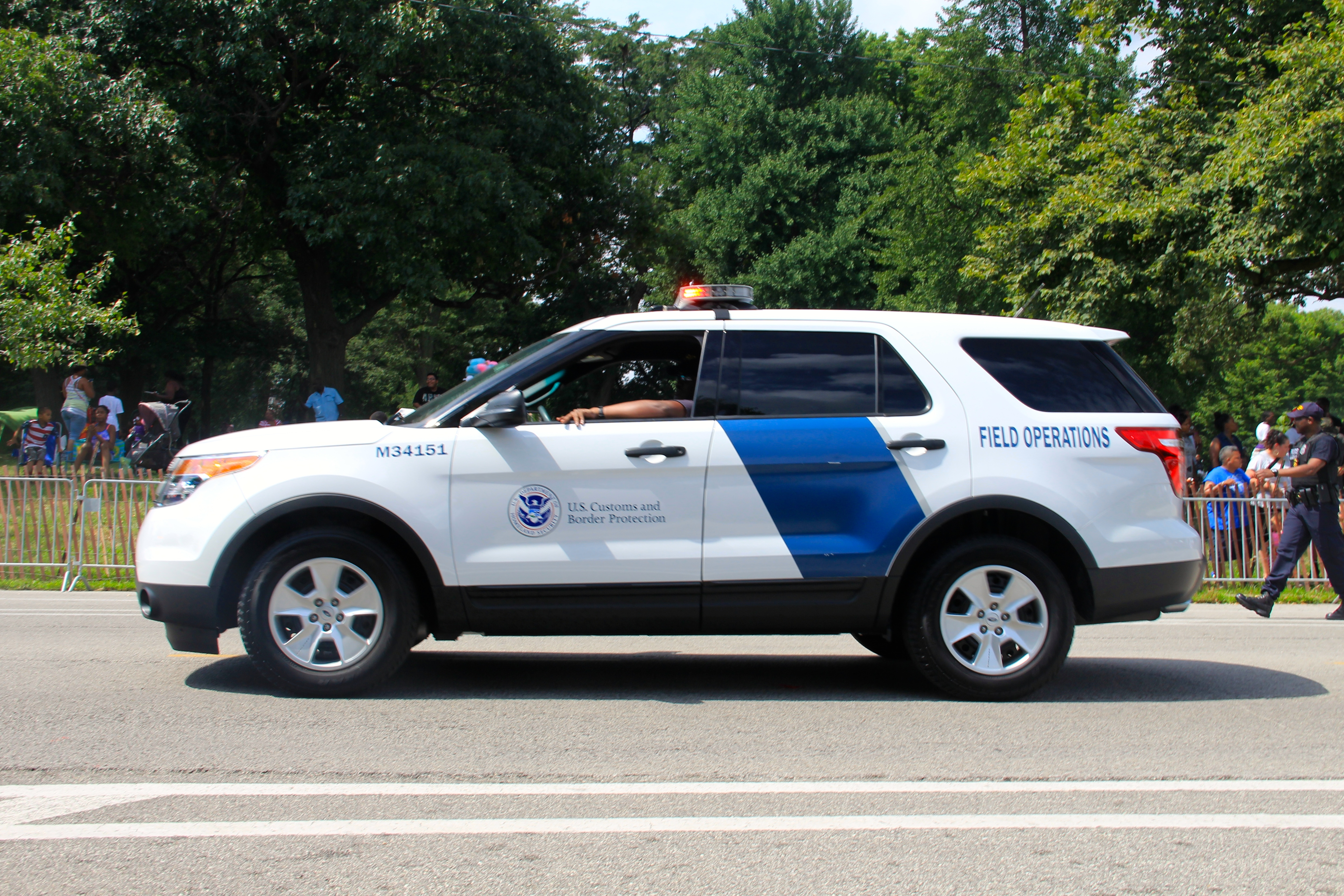
Vehicle at Bud Billiken Parade and Picnic in Chicago

The CBP has the authority to search outbound and inbound shipments, and uses targeting to carry out its mission in this area. Under Section 596 of the Tariff Act, the CBP is required to seize and forfeit all merchandise that is stolen, smuggled, or clandestinely imported or introduced. The CBP is also required to seize and forfeit controlled substances, certain contraband articles, and plastic explosives that do not contain a detection agent. In conjunction with the Department of State and the Bureau of the Census, the CBP has put in place regulations that require submission of electronic export information on U.S. Munitions List and for technology for the Commerce Control List. The CBP uses advance information from the Automated Targeting System and the Automated Export System to identify cargo that may pose a threat. The CBP also works with the departments of state and defense to improve procedures on exported shipments of foreign military sales commodities.

Merchandise may also be seized and forfeited if:

- Its importation is restricted or prohibited because of a law relating to health, safety or conservation;
- The merchandise is lacking a federal license required for the importation;
- The merchandise or packaging is in violation of copyright, trademark, trade name, or trade dress protections;
- The merchandise is intentionally or repetitively marked in violation of country of origin marking requirements; or
- The imported merchandise is subject to quantitative restrictions requiring a visa or similar document from a foreign government, and the document presented with the entry is counterfeit.

=== Civil penalties ===
Section 1592 of the Tariff Act of 1930 is the basic and most widely used customs penalty provision for the importation of goods. It prescribes monetary penalties against any person who imports, attempts to import, or aids or procures the importation of merchandise by means of false or fraudulent documents, statements, omissions or practices, concerning any material fact. Penalties may be applied even in situations where there is no loss of revenue.

Section 1592 infractions are divided into three categories of culpability, each giving rise to a different maximum penalty:

- Fraud, an act or omission done intentionally to defraud the United States. The maximum civil penalty for a violation is the domestic value of the merchandise in the entry or entries concerned.
- Gross negligence, an act or omission with actual knowledge of, or wanton disregard for, the relevant facts and a disregard of section 1592 obligations. The maximum civil penalty is the lesser of the domestic value of the merchandise or four times the loss of revenue (actual or potential). If the infraction does not affect revenue, the maximum penalty is 40% of the dutiable value of the good.
- Negligence, involving a failure to exercise due care in ascertaining the material facts or in ascertaining the obligations under section 1592. The maximum civil penalties are the same for gross negligence, except the lesser of twice the domestic value of the merchandise or twice the loss of revenue is used. The penalty cannot exceed 20% of the dutiable value.

The Customs Modernization Act amended section 1592 to apply existing penalties for false information to information transmitted electronically and allows customs to recover unpaid taxes and fees resulting from 592 violations. It also introduced the requirement that importers use "reasonable care" in making entry and providing the initial classification and appraisement, establishing a "shared responsibility" between customs and importers, thus allowing customs to rely on the accuracy of the information submitted and streamline entry procedures. To the extent that an importer fails to use reasonable care, customs may impose a penalty.

U.S. Customs agriculture specialist officers are allowed to issue civil penalties in accordance with CFR 7 & 9.

=== Criminal penalties ===
In addition to the civil penalties, a criminal fraud statute provides for sanctions to those presenting false information to customs officers, with violators facing a maximum of two years imprisonment, or a $5,000 fine, or both, for each violation involving an importation or attempted importation.

== History ==
=== U.S. Customs Service ===
Responding to an urgent need for revenue following the American Revolutionary War, the First United States Congress passed, and President George Washington signed on July 4, the Tariff of 1789, which authorized the collection of duties on imports. Four weeks later, on July 31, the fifth act of Congress established the United States Customs Service and its ports of entry.

For nearly 125 years, the U.S. Customs Service was the primary source of governmental funds, which paid for the nation's early growth and infrastructure. Purchases include the Louisiana and Oregon territories; Florida and Alaska; funding the National Road and the Transcontinental Railroad; building many of the United States' lighthouses; and military academies.

In March 2003, the Customs Service was renamed the Bureau of Customs and Border Protection, and its structure split to form parts of the U.S. Department of Homeland Security as the Bureau of Customs and Border Protection and the Immigration and Customs Enforcement Division.

=== U.S. Immigration and Naturalization Service (INS) ===
Shortly after the American Civil War, some states started to pass their own immigration laws, which prompted the U.S. Supreme Court to rule in Chy Lung v. Freeman in 1875 that immigration was a federal responsibility. The Immigration Act of 1891 established an Office of the Superintendent of Immigration within the United States Department of the Treasury. This office was responsible for admitting, rejecting, and processing all immigrants seeking admission to the United States and for implementing national immigration policy. "Immigrant inspectors", as they were then called, were stationed at major U.S. ports of entry collecting manifests of arriving passengers. A "head tax" of fifty cents was collected on each immigrant.

In the early 20th century, Congress's primary interest in immigration was protecting American workers and wages – the reason that it had become a federal concern in the first place. This made immigration more a matter of commerce than revenue; hence, in 1903, Congress transferred the Bureau of Immigration to the newly created Department of Commerce and Labor.

After World War I, Congress attempted to stem the flow of immigrants, still mainly coming from Europe, by passing laws in 1921 and 1924 limiting the number of newcomers by assigning a quota to each nationality based upon its representation in previous U.S. census figures. Each year, the U.S. State Department issued a limited number of visas; only those immigrants who had obtained them and could present valid visas were permitted entry.

The Immigration and Naturalization Service was formed in 1933 by a merger of the Bureau of Immigration and the Bureau of Naturalization. President Franklin D. Roosevelt moved the Immigration and Naturalization Service from the Department of Labor to the Department of Justice in 1940.

In 1969, President Richard Nixon formally changed the name of the United States Border Control to the United States Border Patrol.

=== Reorganization (2003 to present) ===
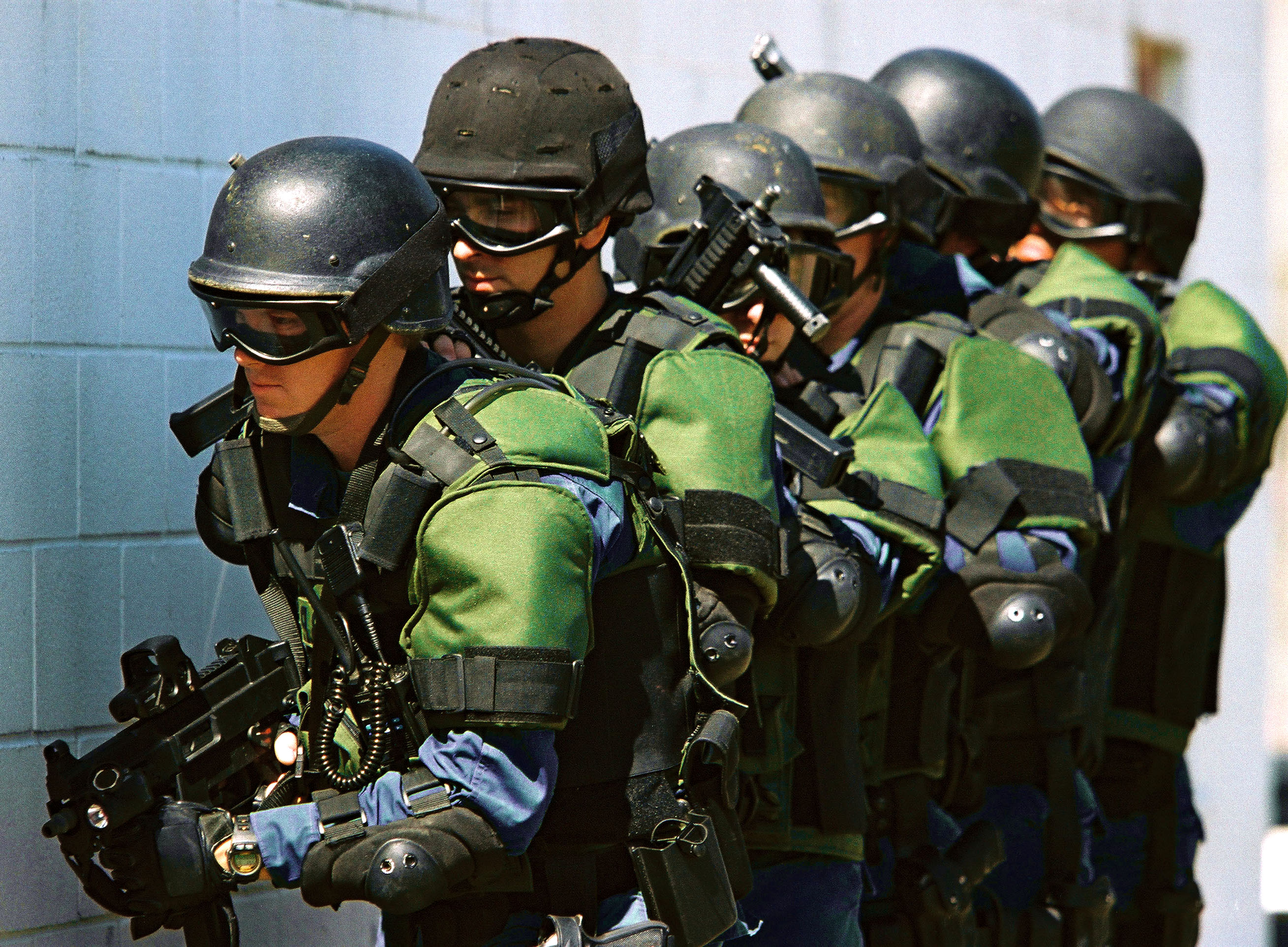
U.S. Customs and Border Protection Officers (CBPO) armed with UMPs

CBP became an official agency of the United States Department of Homeland Security on March 1, 2003, combining employees from the Animal and Plant Health Inspection Service (specifically the Plant Protection Quarantine inspectors), the United States Immigration and Naturalization Service (specifically, immigration inspectors and the United States Border Patrol), and the United States Customs Service. This transformation was led by former commissioner Robert C. Bonner.

W. Ralph Basham was nominated to the post of commissioner by President George W. Bush on June 6, 2006. Basham had 28 years of experience as a law enforcement manager, including serving as the head of the Secret Service and the Federal Law Enforcement Training Center. He had also served as the chief of staff for the Transportation Security Administration. It is the largest federal law enforcement agency and works closely with U.S. Immigration and Customs Enforcement (ICE), Drug Enforcement Administration (DEA), and Federal Bureau of Investigation (FBI).

In 2007, the U.S. Border Patrol joined two units, the Border Patrol Tactical Unit (BORTAC) and the Border Patrol Search, Trauma, and Rescue Unit (BORSTAR), to form the U.S. Border Patrol's Special Operations Group (SOG), headquartered in El Paso, Texas. BORTAC and BORSTAR direct their nationally dispersed assets from the SOG, providing the U.S. Border Patrol with immediate tactical and emergency response assets.

On September 13, 2019, Director Troy Miller rang the closing bell at the New York Stock Exchange in honor of 230 years since the beginnings of the CBP.

== Personnel ==
=== U.S. Customs and Border Protection Officer (CBPO) ===
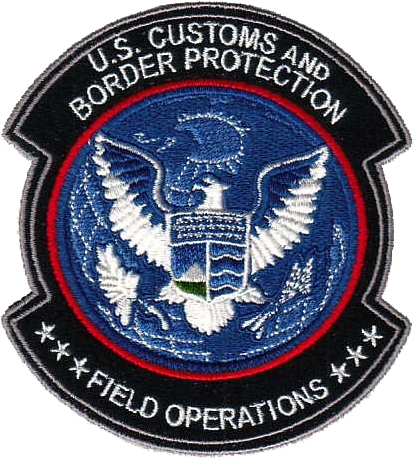
CBP – Office of Field Operations Shoulder Patch

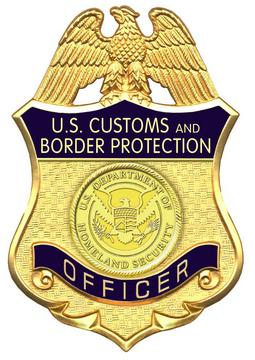
CBP OFO badge

CBP officers are federal law enforcement officers in the largest CBP Office of Field Operations empowered to exercise the authority and perform the duties provided by law and Department of Homeland Security regulations, including making arrests, conducting searches, making seizures, bearing firearms, and serving any order or warrant. CBP officers have full law enforcement powers on and off duty. CBP officers defend against terrorist intrusion by identifying high risk individuals who are attempting to enter into the United States; stop criminal activities – such as drug trafficking, child pornography (including on computers, cell phones, and other electronic media), weapons trafficking, and money laundering – by inspecting vehicles and trucks; and prevent the illegal entry of individuals, the smuggling of prohibited goods, and other customs and immigration violations. Officers are armed with Glock G19 pistols chambered in 9mm, expandable batons, x2 Tasers and oleoresin capsicum pepper spray. In accordance with Public Law 110–161, CBP officers are covered under special law enforcement retirement, and all candidates must be referred for selection for this position before reaching their 40th birthday.

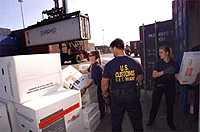
U.S. Customs and Border Protection inspectors at a Cargo Examination

Officer candidates attend the Federal Law Enforcement Training Center, in Glynco, Georgia for 21 weeks of paid training. Candidate training consists of basic law enforcement skills, including Anti-Terrorism; Detection of Contraband; Interviewing; Cross-cultural Communications; Firearms Handling and Qualification; Immigration and Naturalization Laws; U.S. Customs Export and Import laws, Defensive Tactics and Driving; Crime Investigation Site; Arrest Techniques; Baton Techniques; Examination of cargo, bags, and merchandise; border search exception; Entry and Control Procedures; Passenger Processing; and Officer Safety and Survival. Those candidates selected for duty locations requiring Spanish may receive an additional 6 weeks of Spanish Language training. After a few years of service, qualified Officers may serve on CBP's Special Response Team after passing a pre-test and an additional five weeks of paid training at the U.S. Border Patrol Tactical Unit (BORTAC) in El Paso, Texas.

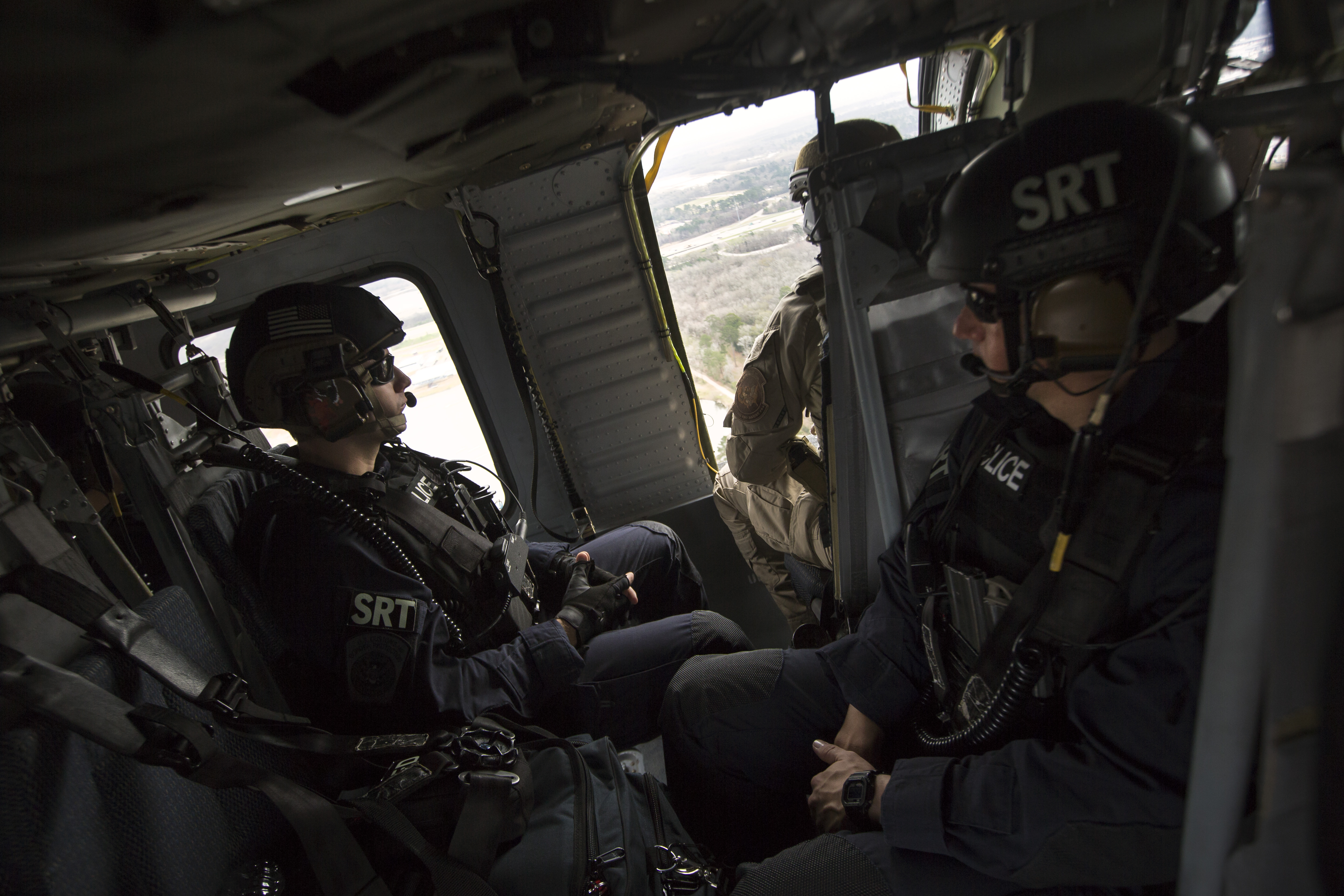
U.S. Customs and Border Protection-Special Response Team, conduct Air interdiction training exercise in advance of Super Bowl LI

CBP officers may begin their careers in any region for which they apply. The duty region is selected during the application phase. Proficiency in Spanish is a duty requirement only for those stationed along southern border regions, although it is not a requirement before being hired. CBP officers stationed along southern border regions will undergo Spanish-language training before coming on duty.

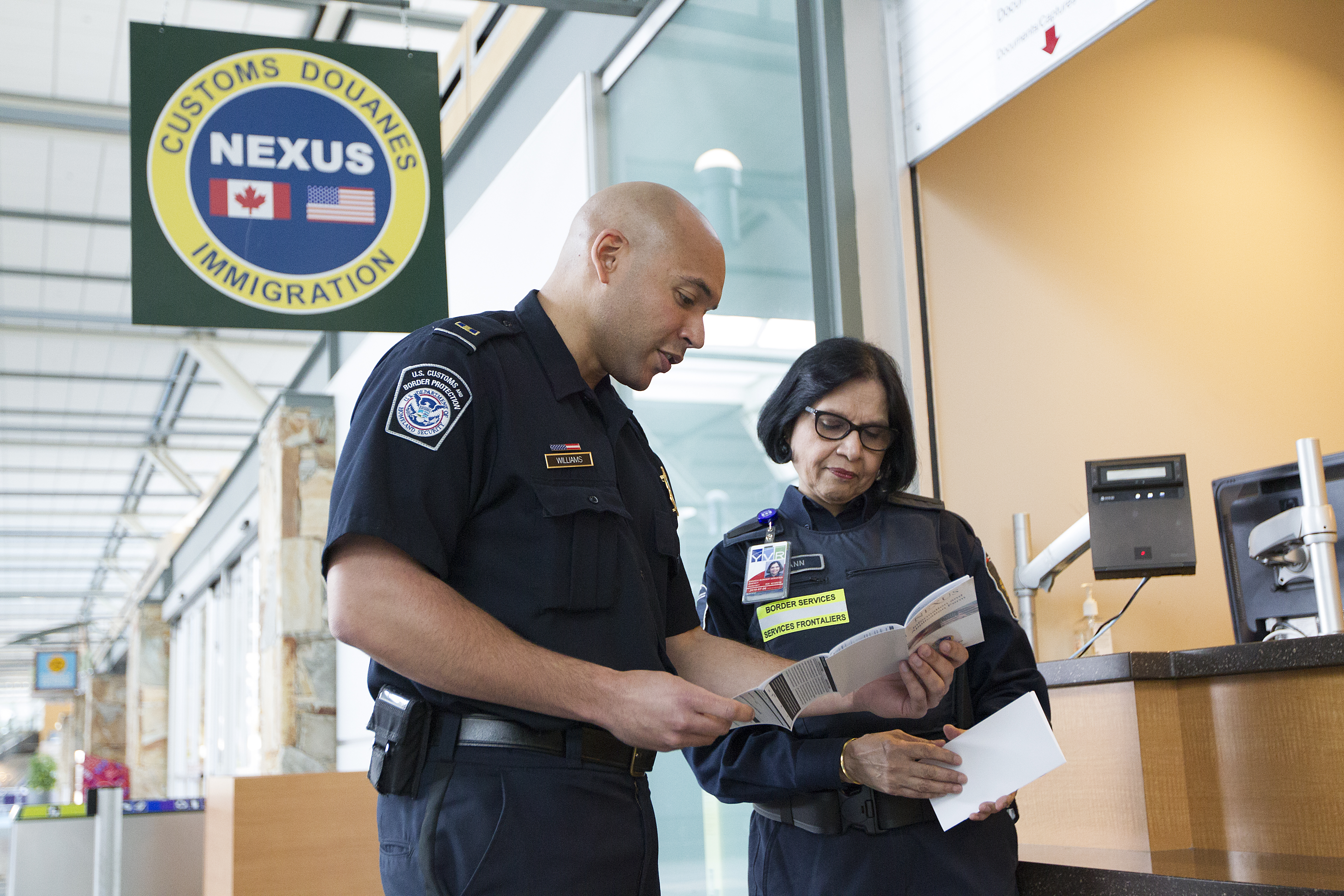
A CBP officer and an officer for the Canada Border Services Agency

The CBP officer position is categorized as a "critical-sensitive" position in law enforcement. For this reason, officer candidates must undergo a single scope background investigation (SSBI) before being appointed. In addition, officer candidates must pass a written exam, undergo drug and medical examination, polygraph examination, a physical fitness test, pre-security screening and structured interview during the pre-appointment phase.

CBP Officer (OFO) Rank and Insignia
| Title | Insignia | Pay grade |
|---|---|---|
| Executive Assistant Commissioner | Four white metal stars in a horizontal row | SES |
| Deputy Executive Assistant Commissioner | Three white metal stars in a horizontal row | SES |
| Director Field Operations / Executive Director | Two white metal stars in a horizontal row | SES |
| Port Director/ Assistant Director Field Operations | One white metal stars in a horizontal row | GS-15 |
| Assistant Port Director / Watch Commander | White metal eagle with wings spread and head turned right, clutching olive branch in right talon and arrows in left talon, bearing escutcheon in French style shape of horizontal stripes above vertical stripes | GS-14 |
| Chief CBP Officer / Program Manager | White metal oak leaf with seven points | GS-13 |
| Supervisory CBP Officer | Yellow metal oak leaf with seven points | GS-13 |
| CBP Officer (Enforcement) / CBP Officer (Intelligence) | White metal single bar | GS-12 |
| CBP Officer (Journeyman) CBP Canine Enforcement Officer (CEO) | Blue single bar outlined in yellow metal with band across it of yellow metal | GS-12 |
| CBP Officer | No insignia | GS-11 |
| CBP Officer (Entry Level) / Academy Trainee | No insignia | GS-9, GS-7, GS-5 |

- The title and authority of Port Director can be held at the GS-12, GS-13, GS-14, GS-15, or SES pay grades based on staffing level of the port.
- Promotion to GS-12 CBP officer is automatic with time in service. Promotions to GS-13 and above are competitive.

=== Agriculture specialists (OFO) ===
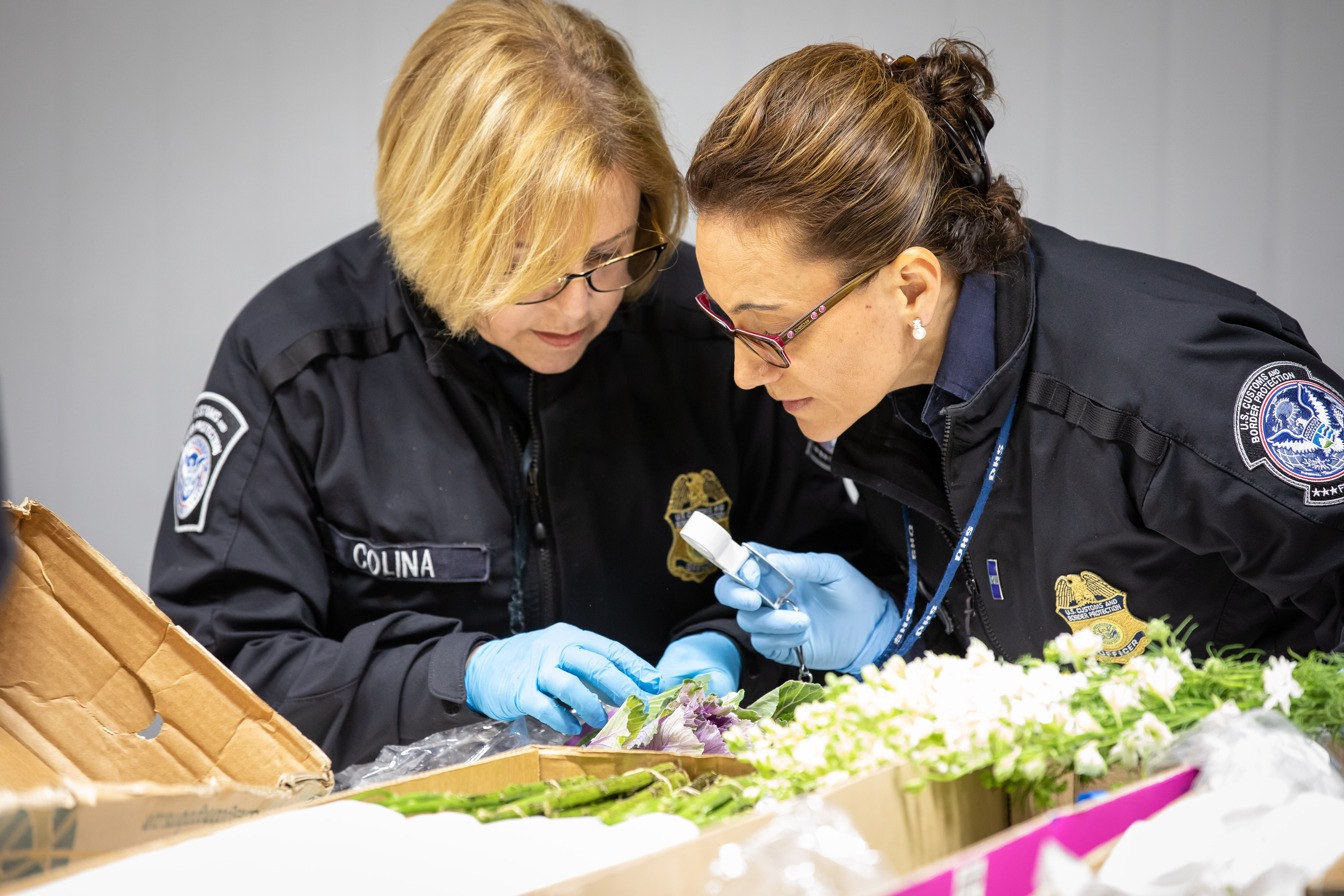
Agriculture Specialists inspecting flower imports

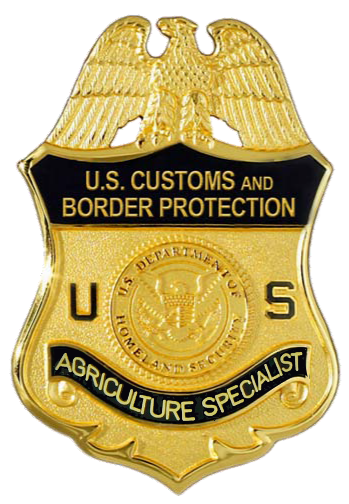
Agriculture Specialist badge

CBP agriculture specialists receive 11 weeks of paid training at the Professional Development Center in Frederick, Maryland as well as a post-academy training phase that varies in length according to their assigned port. Agriculture Specialists are stationed at international ports of entry located at airports, seaports, and land borders throughout the U.S. and along the Canadian and Mexican borders; they are also stationed overseas in various countries authorized by the United States to have the traveling public and agricultural commodities pre-cleared before entering into the United States. They are uniformed federal officers with the authority to conduct random inspections of luggage or items entering the country and the power to seize prohibited or contaminated items. Agricultural Specialists issue civil fines, not to be confused with collecting duty or tax, to both international travelers and commercial entities in accordance with the federal laws CFR 7 & 9; they do not however collect duty taxes. Although agriculture specialists work for and are sworn to uphold and enforce the laws governed under the jurisdiction of Customs and Border Protection, they are also tasked with enforcing the laws governed by the United States Department of Agriculture (USDA) and the United States Fish and Wildlife Service (FWS). They serve as expert and technical consultants in the areas of inspection, intelligence, analysis, examination and law enforcement activities related to the importation of agricultural and commercial commodities and conveyances at the various ports of entry. Agriculture specialists apply a wide range of federal, state and local laws and agency regulations, including those of the U.S. Fish and Wildlife Service (FWS), Centers for Disease Control (CDC), and the Food and Drug Administration (FDA) when determining the admissibility of agricultural commodities, or commodities in general, while regulating and/or preventing the introduction of restricted or prohibited products, harmful pests, diseases and potential agro-terrorism into the United States. They participate in special enforcement, targeting, and analysis teams charged with collecting and analyzing information and identifying high-risk targets; or conducting visual and physical inspections of cargo, conveyances or passenger baggage. The Agriculture Specialist plans, conducts, and supervises remedial actions such as treating, disinfecting and decontaminating prohibited commodities, conveyances, contaminants or agricultural materials.

The agriculture specialist position is categorized as a "sensitive" position in law enforcement and may be granted up to the "Secret" level security clearance. Candidates must undergo a single scope background investigation and a polygraph examination before being appointed. In addition, the candidates must undergo a video based interview as well as a drug and medical examination during the pre-appointment phase.

Agriculture Specialist (OFO) Rank and Insignia
| Title | Insignia | Pay grade |
|---|---|---|
| Chief Agriculture Specialist | White metal eagle with wings spread and head turned right, clutching olive branch in right talon and arrows in left talon, bearing escutcheon in French style shape of horizontal stripes above vertical stripes | GS-14 |
| Supervisory Agriculture Specialist | Yellow metal oak leaf with seven points | GS-13 |
| Agriculture Specialist (Journeyman) / Agriculture Specialist (Canine) | Blue single bar outlined in yellow metal with band across it of yellow metal | GS-12 |
| Agriculture Specialist | No insignia | GS-11 |
| Agriculture Specialist (Entry Level) / Academy Trainee | No insignia | GS-9, GS-7, GS-5 |

=== Import specialists (OFO) ===
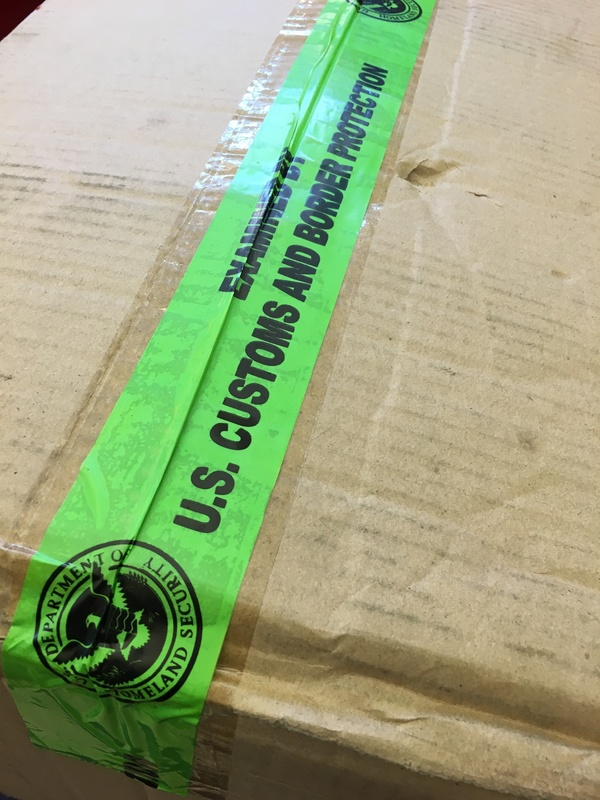
Tape used by U.S. Customs and Border Protection to reseal packages that they have searched, and to indicate that they have done so

Import specialists interact with both importers and exporters and are responsible for decisions regarding merchandise, manufactured goods, and commodities.

Import specialists work alongside CBP officers, Homeland Security Investigations special agents and legal professionals in matters of international trade. They are responsible for classifying and appraising commercially imported merchandise that enter the country. They determine which products may legally enter the country by enforcing laws protecting public health and safety, intellectual property rights and fair trade practices. They detect incidents of smuggling, commercial fraud, and counterfeiting and participate in related criminal investigations.

Import specialists have the authority to issue penalties and fines, to recommend seizure of prohibited or suspect cargo and to participate in negotiations and legal prosecution. Occasionally, import specialists may be given short-term assignments overseas as part of a multi-agency team. Responsibilities could include investigating foreign manufacturing facilities for violations involving child labor, product safety or other areas of concern to the country. Seven weeks of paid specialized training enable import specialists to develop an expert knowledge of import and export trends, commodities, industries, and international trade agreements. Import specialists perform their mission at more than 300 ports of entry located at airports, seaports and land borders throughout the United States and along the Canadian and Mexican borders.

=== United States Border Patrol (USBP) ===
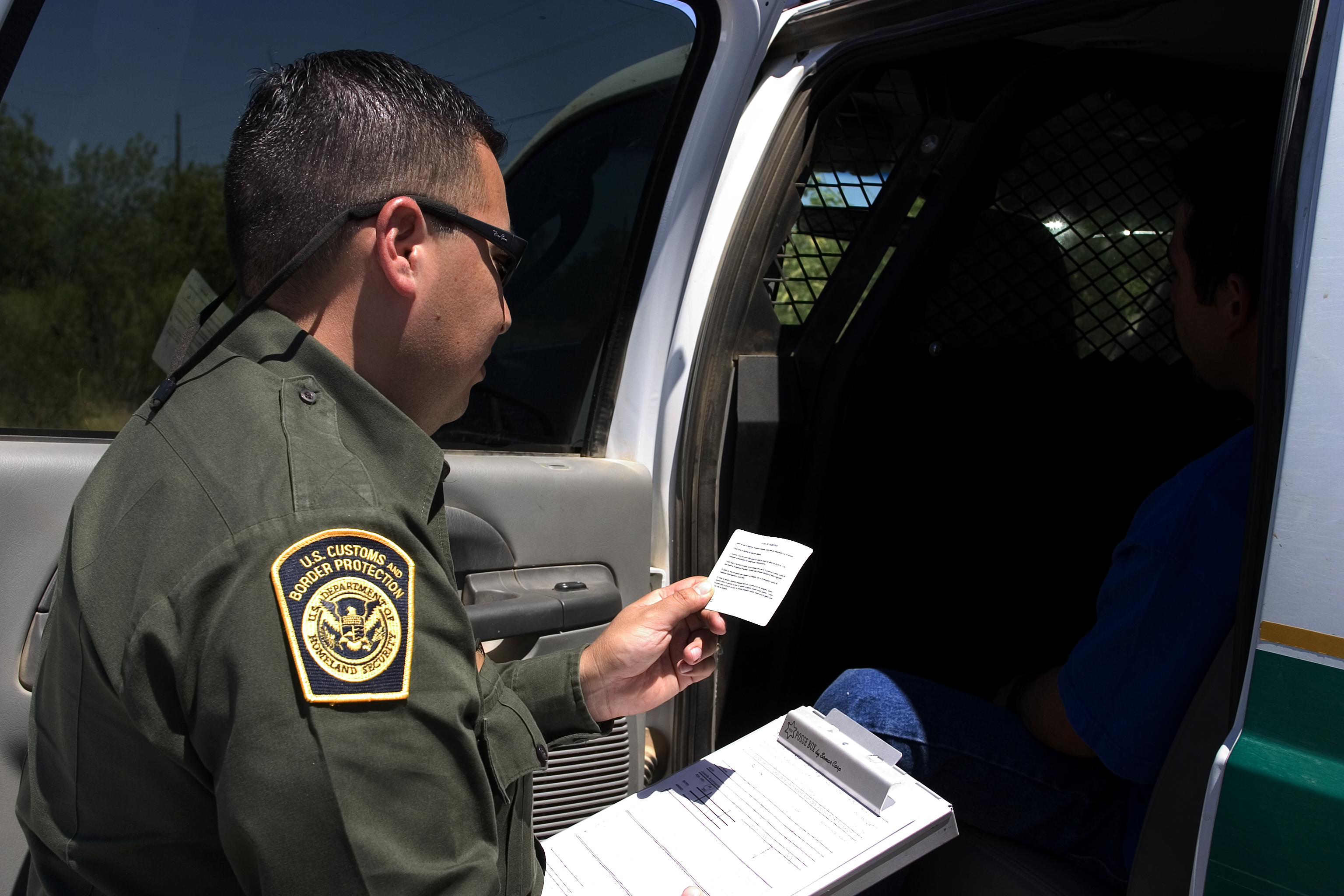
Border Patrol Agent reading the Miranda Rights to a suspect

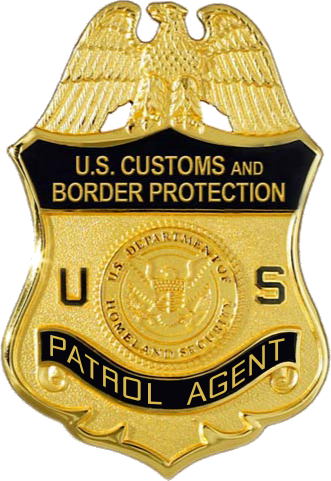
Border Patrol Agent badge

The U.S. Border Patrol agent (as opposed to officer) is a federal law enforcement agent actively patrolling a U.S. border to prevent persons from entering the United States without government permission. Agents detect and prevent the smuggling and unlawful entry of aliens into the United States, along with apprehending those people found to be in violation of immigration laws. Agents work to lower crime and improve the quality of life in border communities. In some areas, Agents are deputized or have peace-officer status and use it to enforce local and state/territory laws. More than 20,000 Border Patrol agents safeguard nearly 6,000 miles of land border the United States shares with Canada and Mexico, and more than 2,000 miles of coastal waters.

Border Surveillance video captured by a UAS (likely along the Mexican border)

One of the most important activities for a United States Border Patrol agent is "line watch". This involves the detection, prevention and apprehension of terrorists, illegal aliens and smugglers of both aliens and contraband at or near the land border by maintaining surveillance from a covert position, following up leads, responding to electronic sensor systems, aircraft sightings, and interpreting and following tracks, marks and other physical evidence. Some of the major activities are farm and ranch check, traffic check, traffic observation, city patrol, transportation check, administrative, intelligence, and anti-smuggling activities.

All agents complete a 26-week paid "Basic Academy" training at the U.S. Border Patrol Academy in Artesia, New Mexico. Training includes such topics as immigration and nationality laws, physical training (PT), weapons and marksmanship. For those needing Spanish language instruction, an additional 8 weeks may be required beyond the 65 days of Basic Academy training. Border Patrol Agents must be willing to work overtime and varying shifts under arduous conditions, and be proficient in the carry and use of firearms. They may also be sent on temporary assignments on short notice, or on permanent reassignments to any duty location. All new agents begin their careers along the Southwest border, where a working knowledge of Spanish is required.

=== Air and marine enforcement and interdiction agents ===
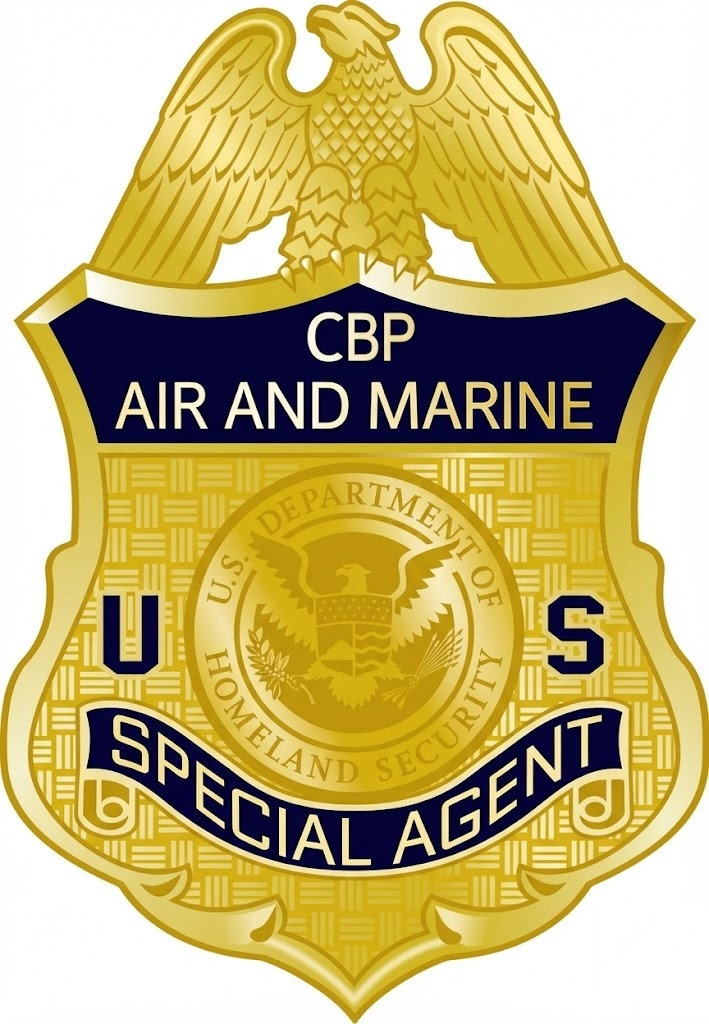
AMO Agent badge

- CBP Air and Marine Operations (AMO)
  - Aviation enforcement agents (AEA)
    An aviation enforcement agent serves as the primary federal law enforcement officer aboard AMO aircraft.
  - Air interdiction agents (AIA)
    Air interdiction agents serve as the pilot in command of an AMO aircraft.
  - Marine interdiction agents (MIA)
    Marine interdiction agents are either the vessel commander or a crew member aboard an AMO vessel.

AMO is the world's largest civilian aviation and maritime law enforcement organization. Its mission is to protect the American people and nation's critical infrastructure through the coordinated use of air and marine assets to detect, interdict and prevent acts of terrorism and the unlawful movement of people, illegal drugs, and other contraband toward or across the borders of the United States. Air and marine interdiction agents are endowed with the authority to enforce Title 8 (Aliens and Nationality) and Title 19 (Customs) of the United States Code in addition to the general law enforcement powers bestowed upon federal law enforcement agents.

This specialized law enforcement capability allows AMO to make significant contributions to the efforts of the Department of Homeland Security, as well as to those of other federal, state, local, and tribal agencies. AMO is uniquely positioned to provide direct air and maritime support to multiple agencies and to ensure the success of border protection and law enforcement operations between ports of entry, within the maritime domain and within the nation's interior. To accomplish its mission, AMO employs over 1,200 federal agents at 70 locations, operating more than 260 aircraft of 26 different types, and approximately 300 maritime vessels. It is one of the major operational components within U.S. Customs and Border Protection, along with the Office of Field Operations (OFO) and the United States Border Patrol (USBP).

=== Employee morale ===
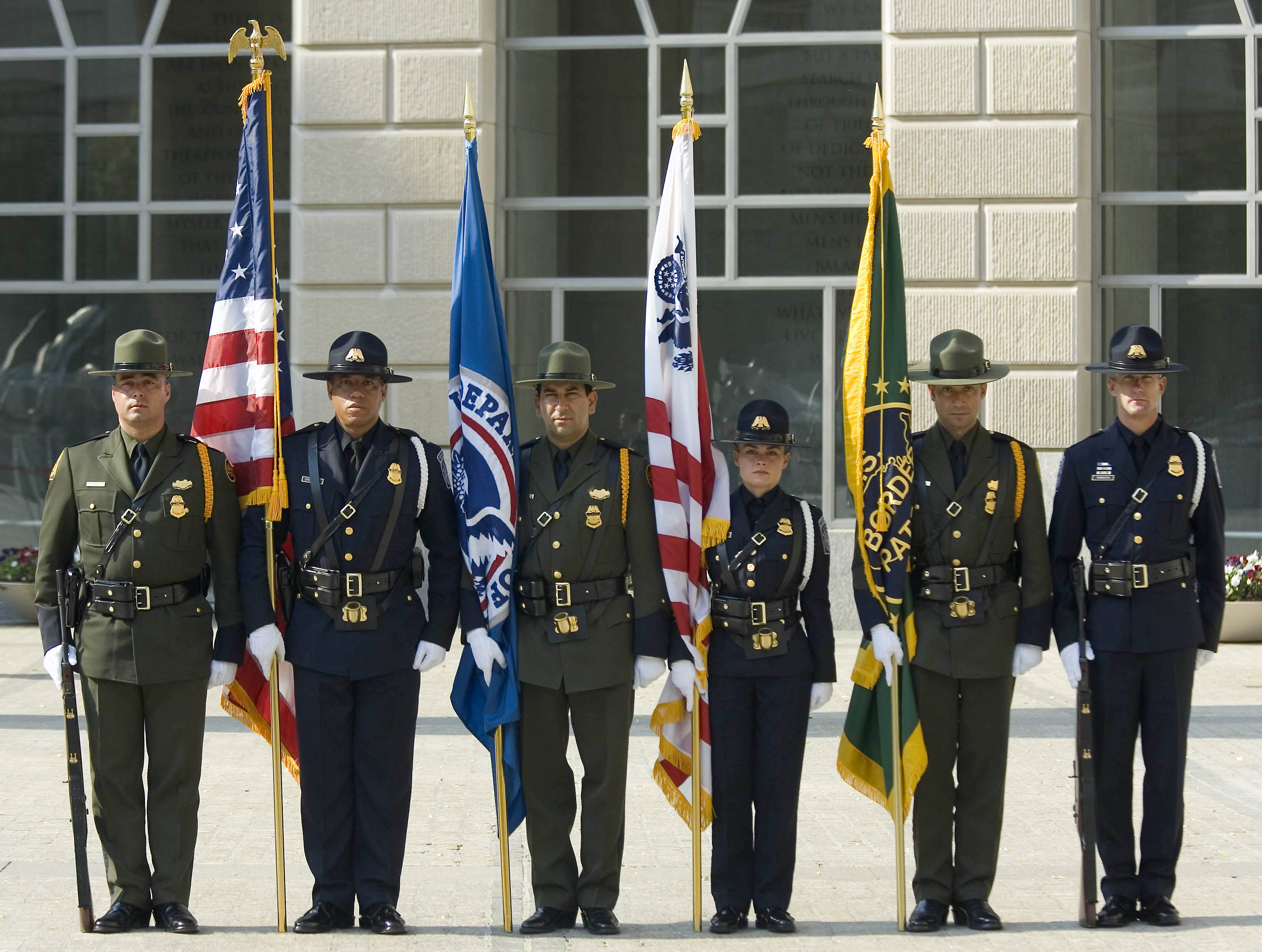
A color guard composed of CBP officers and USBP agents at a Washington, D.C. ceremony in May 2007

In July 2006, the Office of Personnel Management conducted a survey of federal employees in all 36 federal agencies on job satisfaction and how they felt their respective agency was headed. DHS (which includes CBP) was last or near to last in every category including

- 36th on the job satisfaction index
- 35th on the leadership and knowledge management index
- 36th on the results-oriented performance culture index
- 33rd on the talent management index

The low scores were attributed to major concerns about basic supervision, management and leadership within DHS. Based on the survey, the primary concerns are about promotion and pay increase based on merit, dealing with poor performance, rewarding creativity and innovation, and the inability of leadership to generate high levels of motivation in the workforce, recognition for doing a good job, lack of satisfaction with various component policies and procedures and lack of information about what is going on with the organization and complaints from the traveling public.

In June 2007, CBP commissioner W. Ralph Basham announced to employees that the agency would be conducting 125 different focus groups in 12 different cities around the country to better understand their concerns as expressed in the Human Capital Survey. The agency is also going to give employees who are not a part of that focus group process an intranet virtual focus group where they can express their views and their concerns. The commissioner stated: "We are looking at this very seriously. We want to hear from the employees, we want to hear from these focus groups, we want to drill down on this survey." In 2011, more than four years after this statement was made, these focus groups have never been reported to have been held, nor have any plans been reported for them to be held in the future.

A November 2007 Government Accountability Office report showed that low staffing, training, and overwork is a large problem within CBP, and an average of 71 officers leave the service every two weeks.

CBP continued carrying out their mission during the COVID-19 pandemic in the United States. As of June 17, 2020, 544 federal employees tested positive for COVID-19 and 5 have died as a result of the virus.

=== Polygraphing ===
In 2011, the United States Congress mandated that applicants to CBP jobs undergo polygraph testing. The agency polygraphs about 10,000 applicants annually. From the start of the polygraphing until August 16, 2013, over 200 confessions of wrongdoing had been made. Many of the applicants confessed that they had close associations with drug traffickers or that they were directly involved in smuggling of drugs and illegal immigrants. The agency accused ten applicants of using countermeasures. As part of the "Operation Lie Busters", the name of the crackdown on polygraph countermeasures, all ten were not selected for employment.

== Equipment ==
=== Aircraft ===
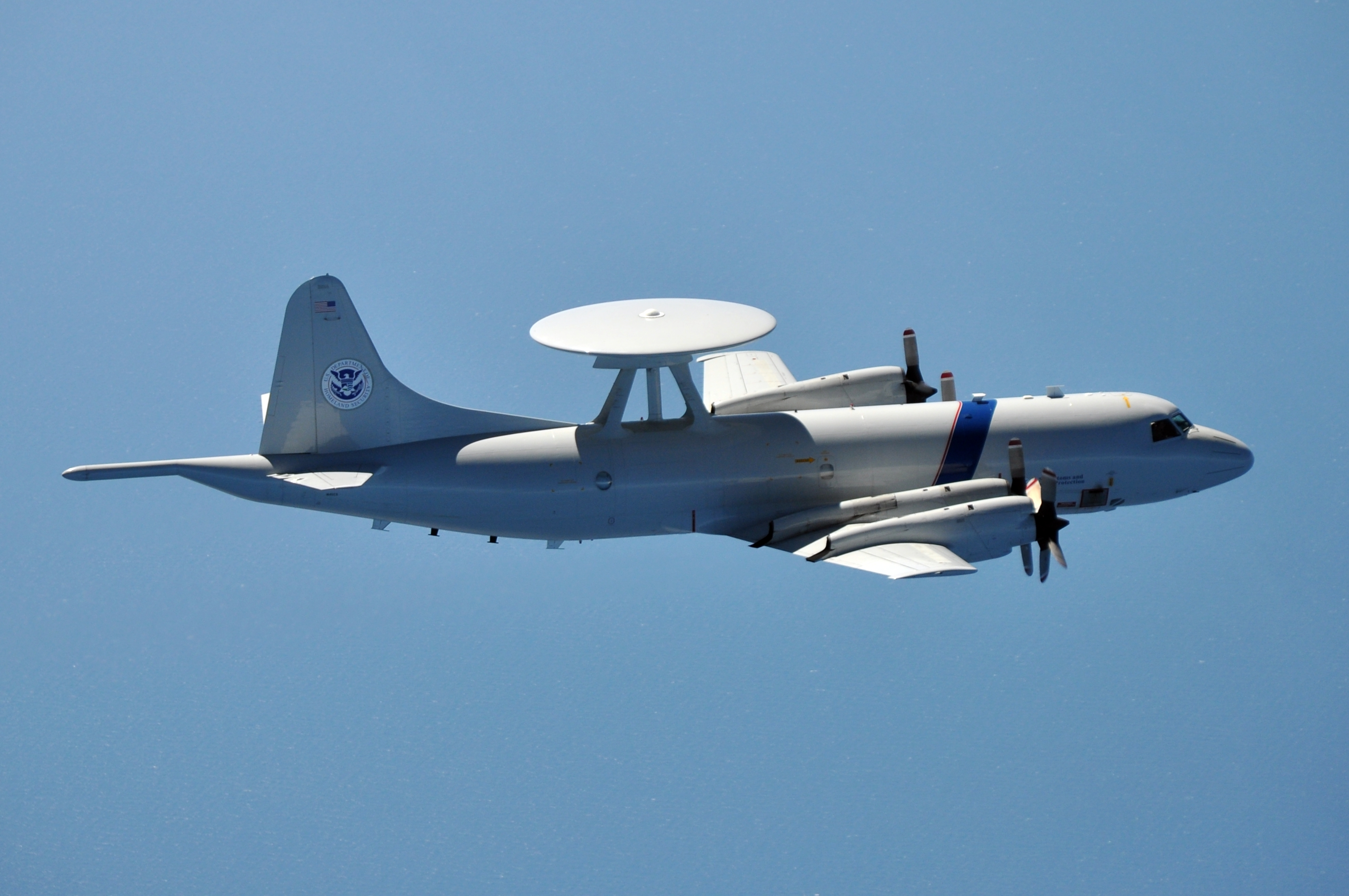
A US Customs P-3 AEW on an anti-narcotic mission

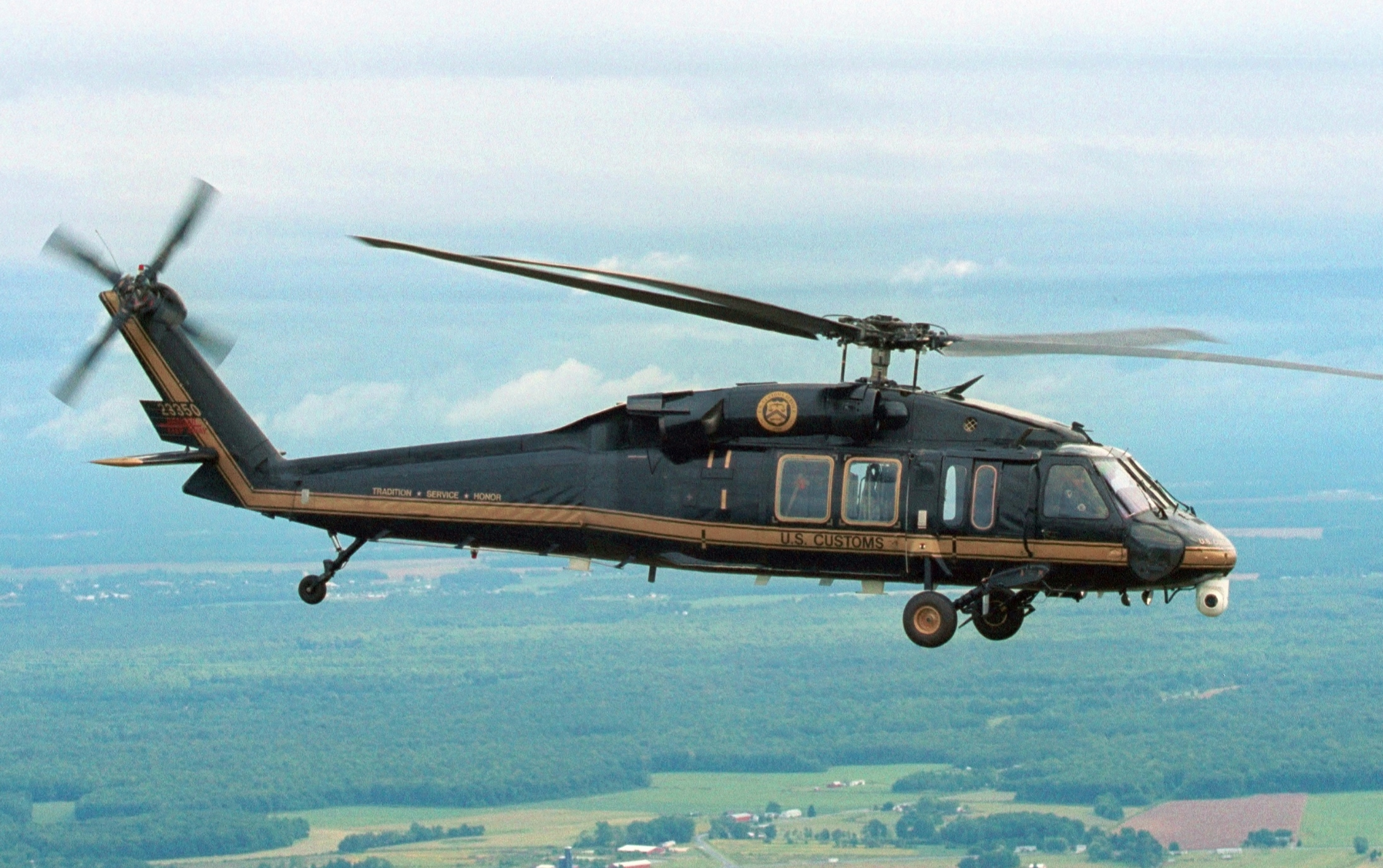
A CBP UH-60 Blackhawk in flight

| Aircraft | Origin | Type | Variant | In service | Notes |
Maritime Patrol
| Bombardier DHC-8 | Canada | surveillance / transport | | | equipped with a marine search radar |
Surveillance
| Cessna 210 | United States | surveillance | 206 | | |
| Super King Air | United States | surveillance / patrol | 350ER / 200 | | |
| Lockheed P-3 | United States | Interceptor / surveillance | P-3 (LRT) | | equipped with an APG-66V radar |
| Pilatus PC-12 | Switzerland | surveillance / transport | PC-12NG | | outfitted with an Electro-optical / infrared sensor |
AWACS
| Lockheed P-3 | United States | early warning control | P-3AEW&C | | modified with a rotating AN/APS-145 radar dome |
Helicopters
| Bell UH-1 | United States | utility | UH-1H / Huey II | | |
| Sikorsky S-76 | United States | surveillance / counter-terrorism | | | |
| Sikorsky UH-60 | United States | utility / transport | | | |
| Eurocopter AS350 | France | utility / surveillance | | | |
| Eurocopter EC120 | France | utility / surveillance | | | |
UAV
| General Atomics MQ-9 | United States | surveillance | Guardian | | |

=== Watercraft ===
| Vessel | Origin | Class | Variant | In service | Notes |
|---|---|---|---|---|---|
| Diamondback Airboat | United States | riverine | 18' open cabin | | |
| SAFE Full Cabin | United States | riverine | 25' full cabin | | equipped with a marine surface radar |
| SAFE Full Cabin | United States | interceptor | 33' full cabin | | |
| SAFE Full Cabin | United States | interceptor | 38' full cabin | | equipped with an Electro-optical / infrared sensors |
| Midnight Express | United States | interceptor | 39' open cabin | | |
| Interim SeaHunter | United States | interceptor | 40' open cabin | | |
| Invincible | United States | interceptor | 42' open cabin | | |
| Intrepid | United States | Coastal Enforcement | 30 open cabin | | shallow water and coastal patrol |

=== Weapons ===
CBP officers primary sidearm since 2019 is the Glock 19 pistol in 9mm caliber. It can contain as many as 16 rounds of ammunition (15 in the magazine and one in the chamber). Like many other law enforcement agencies, the 12 gauge Remington Model 870 is the standard pump-action shotgun. The CBP issue Model 870 has been modified by Scattergun Technologies to CBP specifications including: a 14-inch barrel, a five-shot capacity magazine, a composite stock with pistol grip, and night sights with a tactical "ghost-ring" rear sight. CBP uses the 5.56x45 caliber Colt M4 Carbine (M4A1) as the standard long gun for CBP Officers assigned to its aviation and maritime interdiction units, the CBP Border Patrol, the CBP Special Response Teams.

In April 2019, CBP awarded Glock a contract to replace the H&K P2000. A special version of the Glock known as G47 was produced for CBP, along with Glock G19 compact and Glock G26 subcompacts modified to CBP specifications. All will be chambered in 9mm caliber.

== Criticism ==
In 2008, National Public Radio's Morning Edition reported that CBP radiation-detection equipment at ports is "better at detecting kitty litter than dangerous weapons," and that U.S. borders are so porous that congressional investigators carrying simulated nuclear materials have walked across unchallenged.

In a 2008 article entitled "DHS Decision-Making: Competence or Character?", James Giermanski stated that the fundamental problem within CBP is that the agency has weak and sometimes flawed management. He said that DHS and CBP suffer from "seriously flawed decision-making", citing the "door only" policy, radio frequency identification technology, and lack of focus on exports which contain bombs.

The agency's practice of performing internal document checks on buses and trains running entirely within U.S. territory has been called "coercive, unconstitutional, and tainted by racial profiling".

The United States Court of International Trade found that CBP improperly classified merchandise when it had untrained chemists testifying before the court. The court found that there were errors in the laboratory reports, that CBP destroyed the evidence, and the tests used by the chemist did not meet any Daubert standards.

During a federal court case for unlawful removal, CBP and United States Department of Justice attorneys cited the U.S. Supreme Court case of Garcetti v. Ceballos (04-473), which ruled that CBP employees do not have protection from retaliation by CBP managers under the First Amendment of the Constitution. The free-speech protections of the First Amendment have long been used to shield whistleblowers from retaliation. In response to the Supreme Court decision of Garcetti v. Ceballos, the House of Representatives passed H.R. 985, the Whistleblower Protection Act of 2007, and the Senate passed its version of the Whistleblower Protection Act (S. 274), which has significant bipartisan support.

In 2005, a merger of ICE and CBP was considered, following a review at the request Senator Susan Collins (R-ME), chairwoman of the Senate Homeland Security and Governmental Affairs Committee, that found morale and operational issues with ICE and the overlapping responsibilities within the two agencies.

A 2018 report by the ACLU and University of Chicago Law School's International Human Rights Clinic alleged that there was pervasive physical, verbal, sexual, and psychological abuse of immigrant children by DHS and CBP officials. The report was based on over 30,000 pages of documents obtained through the Freedom of Information Act, which condition hundreds of allegations said to have occurred between 2009 and 2014. The report described "conditions that are too often neglectful at best and sadistic at worst." Customs and Border Protection denied the allegations. The same year, the ACLU published the guide, "Know Your Rights: In the 100-mile Border Zone."

On 1 July 2019, ProPublica published an article detailing a secret Facebook group for current and former Border Patrol agents called "I'm 10-15" (Border Patrol code for "aliens in custody"), which had around 9,500 members. ProPublica published screenshots and quotes of group members mocking and posting memes about migrant deaths, making misogynistic and racist jokes, including jokes about Latino members of the U.S. Congress, such as Representatives Alexandria Ocasio-Cortez and Veronica Escobar. The article noted that the posts targeting Ocasio-Cortez in particular were "perhaps the most disturbing", a number of which included depictions of her in sexually obscene illustrations. Ocasio-Cortez said that the existence of the group was an indication of problems deep within the agency, writing, "This isn't about 'a few bad eggs.' This is a violent culture". On 2 July, CBP announced that it had initiated an investigation, and Border Patrol chief Carla Provost said that the "posts are completely inappropriate" and vowed to hold any involved employees accountable. However, the following day, Politico reported that Border Patrol leadership had been aware of the group since 2016. Later that month, it further came to light that Provost herself was once a member of the group, having posted in it in November 2018.

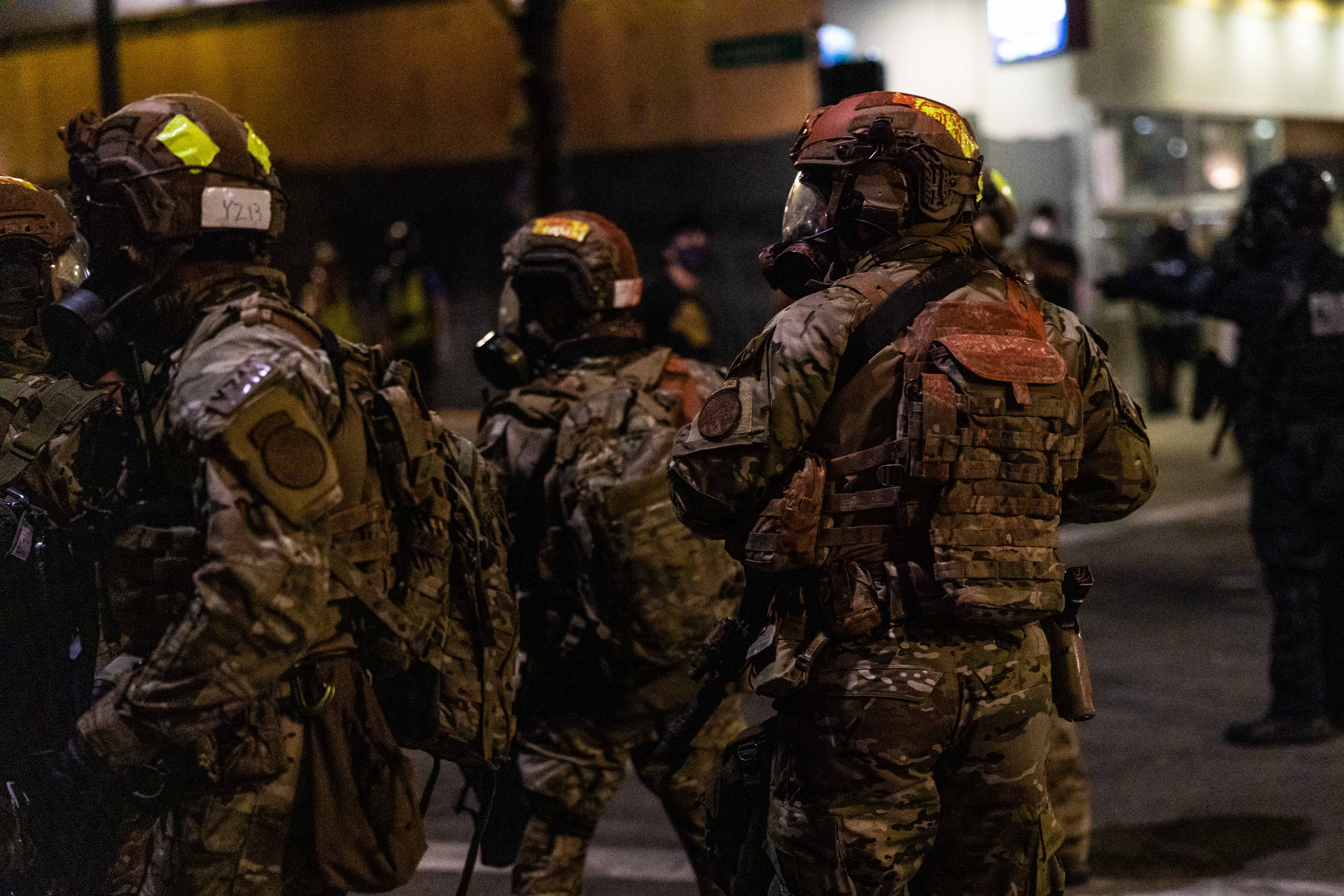
US CBP in Portland during Black Lives Matter protests

In July 2020, the Trump administration dispatched federal officers to Portland, Oregon, during protests in the city following the murder of George Floyd. Policing tactics such as the detainment of protesters in unmarked vans and the shooting of protester Donavan La Bella in the head with an impact round were linked to a deployment that included CBP BORTAC agents sent to the city against the wishes of state and local government. U.S. Customs and Border Protection was named in the resulting suit filed by the Oregon Department of Justice, which accused CBP and other federal agencies of violating protesters' civil rights.

The CBP was criticized in September 2022 for amassing a database of digital data from travelers crossing the U.S. border, with up to 10,000 people entered into the database per year, as well as the fact that around 2,700 CBP officers have warrantless access to the database and people's data. Senator Ron Wyden addressed an official letter to the CBP commissioner, raising concern about "allowing indiscriminate rifling through Americans' private records" and asking that the searches be limited to criminal investigation suspects and known security risks.

A program run by CBP to photograph those leaving the United States was criticized for its implications on privacy.

CBP can search the devices of travelers entering the United States.

In 2025, CBP faced extensive criticism for aggressive use of force during Operation Midway Blitz under Greg Bovino, including multiple instances of using teargas against peaceful protestors.

== See also ==
- Australian Border Force (ABF)
- Awards and decorations of the United States Department of Homeland Security
- Canada Border Services Agency (CBSA)
- Diplomatic Security Service
- Electronic System for Travel Authorization (ESTA)
- Harmonized Tariff Schedule for the United States
- Port security
- SBInet
- Secure Border Initiative
- Supply chain security
- Title 19 of the Code of Federal Regulations
- Transportation Security Administration
- U.S. Coast Guard
- U.S. Marshals Service
- U.S. Secret Service
- U.S. Citizenship and Immigration Services (USCIS)
- U.S. Immigration and Customs Enforcement (ICE)
- United States border preclearance
- United States Border Patrol interior checkpoints
- United States Visitor and Immigrant Status Indicator Technology (US-VISIT)
- Guardia di Finanza
