= Entry visibility =

Entry visibility is an aspect of supply chain visibility which allows a company to manage the proper use of trade compliance data for the importation of goods from the time they leave a foreign supplier until the time those goods reach their destination. Entry visibility aims to ensure that all regulatory, compliance, and documentation requirements are met in a timely fashion along the way. When importing into the U.S., every individual transaction must be compliant with The Customs Modernization Act ("Mod Act"), and the Importer Security Filing (10+2). Under the Mod Act, importers are required to maintain and produce timely records at the time of entry. Furthermore, the Mod Act includes a "Reasonable Care" clause, which states that importers and brokers need a comprehensive audit process to ensure they have met all compliance requirements and provided the correct information on all entry filings.

An entry is a declaration of information prepared by a customs broker on an entry form and submitted to customs. The information on an entry includes, but is not limited to, the following data elements:

- Harmonized Schedule Number
- Country of origin
- Description of goods
- Quantity
- CIF (Cost, Insurance, and Freight) value of the goods
- Estimated amount of duty paid

Upon inspection by a customs officer, if the entry is verified as correct or "perfect entry," the goods are released upon payment of duty to the importer. If an entry has incorrect information, customs may hold the shipment if the importer does not "reconcile" the entry.

Main types of entry include:

- Consumption entry: for goods to be offered for sale (consumption) in the importing country
- Formal entry: that is required to be covered by an entry bond because its aggregate value exceeds a certain amount
- Informal entry: that is not required to be covered under an entry bond because its value is less than a certain amount
- In-transit entry: for the movement of goods from the port of unloading to the port of destination under a Customs bond
- Mail entry: for goods entering through post office or courier service and below a certain value
- Personal baggage entry: for goods brought imported as personal baggage
- Transportation and exportation entry: for goods passing through a country en route to another country
- Warehouse entry: for the goods stored in a bonded warehouse.

== Entry visibility solutions ==
Due to time and cost restrictions most importers cannot audit all of their entries on a regular basis, and therefore they are potentially losing money due to classification errors, inaccurate quantities or missed Free Trade Agreement eligibility. With an entry visibility solution, importers are provided with a global view of all entries filed, helping to increase trade compliance and ensuring that all available savings are realized when importing goods. An automated solution identifies common entry errors such as incorrect tariff numbers, product description, and country of origin. With a solution in place, companies have the ability to identify missing or inaccurate data on the entry virtually immediately after the entry have been filed. Having visibility this soon allows the company to determine the root cause of the error, take the steps both internally and externally to correct the errors, and to report the errors soon after the error is filed instead of months after, reducing the chance of customs withholding shipments and causing delays.

The bigger picture of an automated solution is the savings involved. Costs can be minimized by taking the necessary steps to avoid penalties that result when errors are repeatedly made. Furthermore, with an entry visibility solution, errors can be prevented in the entry by sending all of the necessary classification and filing information to the broker up front. This allows for the automatic retrieval and reconciliation of the entry filing on the backend. Keeping customers, suppliers, 3PLs, freight forwarders, and brokers all on the same page can be accomplished with an automated solution, allowing all parties to view the same data and further ensure the information on the entry is correct and up-to-date.

== Resources ==
- Customs and Border Protection
- National Customs Brokers & Forwarders Association of America
- Entry Visibility Tutorial
