= Ronald Vitiello =

American government official (born 1963)

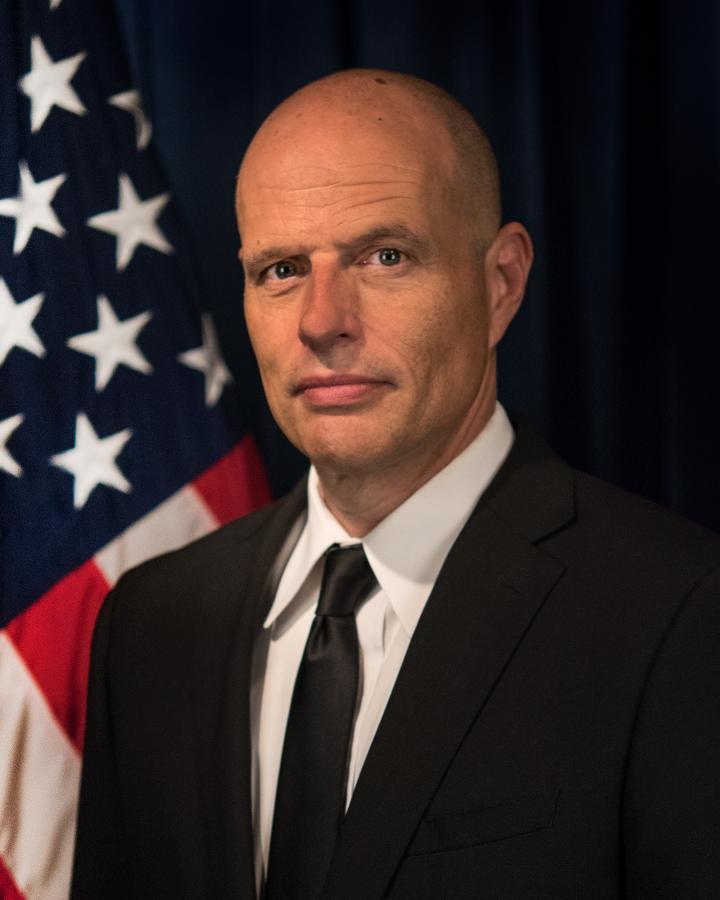

Acting Director of the U.S. Immigration and Customs Enforcement
- In office June 30, 2018 – April 12, 2019
- President: Donald Trump
- Deputy: Matthew Albence (acting)
- Preceded by: Tom Homan (acting)
- Succeeded by: Matthew Albence (acting)

Acting Deputy Commissioner of U.S. Customs and Border Protection
- In office April 25, 2017 – June 29, 2018
- President: Donald Trump
- Preceded by: Randolph Alles
- Succeeded by: Robert Perez (acting)
- Incumbent
- Assumed office March 23, 2026
- President: Donald Trump
- Preceded by: Joseph N. Mazzara

Chief of the United States Border Patrol
- In office February 1, 2017 – April 25, 2017
- President: Donald Trump
- Preceded by: Mark Morgan
- Succeeded by: Carla Provost
- In office Acting: December 1, 2015 – July 20, 2016
- President: Barack Obama
- Preceded by: Michael J. Fisher
- Succeeded by: Mark Morgan

Personal details
- Born: Ronald Donato Vitiello; July 30, 1963 (age 63) Addison, Illinois, U.S.
- Spouse: Nuri
- Children: 2
- Education: Grossmont College

Ronald Donato Vitiello (born July 30, 1963) is an American government official and former U.S. border patrol agent who served as deputy director and acting director of the U.S. Immigration and Customs Enforcement from June 30, 2018 to April 12, 2019. He previously served as acting deputy commissioner of the U.S. Customs and Border Protection from 2017 to 2018 and again in 2026 in the second Trump administration and chief of the United States Border Patrol in 2017. In 2018, U.S. president Donald Trump awarded Vitiello a Presidential Rank Award for Distinguished Executive in the Senior Executive Service.

== Career ==
Vitiello joined the U.S. Border Patrol agent in 1985, as a member of the Border Patrol Academy of Class 174. His first duty station was in Laredo, Texas. He has held various leadership positions within the Border Patrol, including supervisory Border patrol agent; assistant patrol agent in charge; special operations Supervisor; deputy assistant regional director for the Border Patrol at Immigration and Naturalization Services’ Central Region Office in Dallas, Texas; chief patrol agent for the Rio Grande Valley Sector in Edinburg, Texas, and for the Swanton Sector in Swanton, Vermont sectors; assistant chief patrol agent; and Senior Associate chief.

=== Chief of the Border Patrol ===
In 2010, Vitiello was appointed deputy chief of the Border Patrol, and in 2015-16 he served as acting chief, after which Mark A. Morgan was appointed chief. Vitiello then served as executive assistant commissioner for operations support at U.S. Customs and Border Protection, the Border Patrol's parent agency.

Vitiello was appointed chief of the Border Patrol by President Donald Trump in January 2017 and assumed the position on February 1, 2017, replacing Mark A. Morgan. The National Border Patrol Council, the union which represents Border patrol agents, openly supported Vitiello for the position.

=== Deputy Commissioner of U.S. Customs and Border Protection ===
After U.S. Customs and Border Protection deputy commissioner Randolph Alles resigned to become the director of the United States Secret Service, Vitiello was appointed to take his place on April 25, 2017.

In the second Trump administration Vitiello was named acting deputy commissioner again after serving as a senior advisor to commissioner Rodney Scott.

=== Acting Director of U.S. Immigration and Customs Enforcement ===
In early June 2018, Vitiello was named acting director of U.S. Immigration and Customs Enforcement (ICE) by Secretary of Homeland Security Kirstjen Nielsen. Under Vitiello's leadership, ICE continued implementing a policy of "zero tolerance," which critics charge has had the result of separating families at the border and increasing deportations.

In August 2018, Trump nominated Vitiello to become ICE's permanent director.

During a 2018 Senate confirmation hearing, Senator Gary Peters brought up a 2015 tweet from Vitiello, where he suggested to Mark Levin that the Democratic Party be renamed the "liberalcratic party or the NeoKlanist party". Vitiello said it was intended as a direct message, was a joke, and was sorry it caused offense; Kamala Harris echoed Peters' reply, grilling him on why that was a poor comparison. When Vitiello said the KKK "tried to use fear and force" against "race and ethnicity", Harris asked if Vitiello saw parallels between ICE and the KKK, especially with ICE's enforcement of the Trump administration family separation policy. This led to a strong reaction from Fox News's Trish Regan and a strong letter to Harris from the Federal Law Enforcement Officers Association.

On April 4, 2019, Trump rescinded Vitiello's nomination as director of ICE, stating to reporters the next day at the White House before leaving on a trip to border that, "Ron’s a good man, but we’re going in a tougher direction." On April 10, 2019, Vitiello announced his resignation from ICE.

== Personal life and education ==
Vitiello graduated from Santana High School in 1981. He is married to Nuri and has two children.

Political offices
Preceded by Michael J. Fisher	Chief of the United States Border Patrol; Acting; 2015–2016	Succeeded by Mark A. Morgan
Preceded by Mark A. Morgan	Chief of the United States Border Patrol; 2017	Succeeded by Carla Provost
Preceded by Randolph Alles	Deputy Commissioner of U.S. Customs and Border Protection; Acting; 2017–2018	Succeeded by Robert Perez; Acting
Government offices
Preceded by Tom Homan; Acting	Director of the U.S. Immigration and Customs Enforcement; Acting; 2018–2019	Succeeded by Matthew Albence; Acting
