= John P. Sanders =

American government official

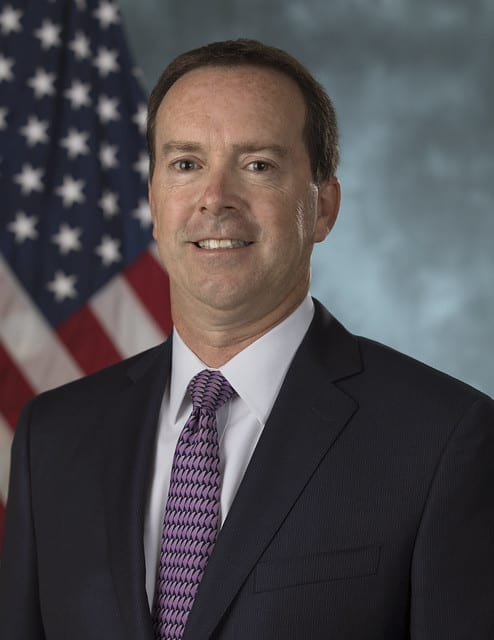

Acting Commissioner of U.S. Customs and Border Protection
- In office April 15, 2019 – July 5, 2019
- President: Donald Trump
- Deputy: Robert E. Perez
- Preceded by: Kevin McAleenan
- Succeeded by: Mark A. Morgan (acting)

Chief Operating Officer of U.S. Customs and Border Protection
- In office July 2018 – April 15, 2019
- President: Donald Trump
- Succeeded by: Mark Morgan

Assistant Administrator of the Office of Security Capabilities at the Transportation Security Administration
- In office August 31, 2012 – December 2014
- President: Barack Obama

Personal details
- Education: University of California, San Diego; San Diego State University

John P. Sanders is an American technologist and business executive, who is the former Acting Commissioner of U.S. Customs and Border Protection (CBP).

== Background ==
Sanders holds a Bachelor of Science in Physics from University of California, San Diego and a Masters of Science in Physics from San Diego State University.

He was a co-founder of Reveal Imaging Technologies, a security screening technology company, where he served as Executive Vice President. After Reveal was acquired by Science Applications International Corporation (SAIC) , he became a Vice President at that company. Sanders has also served as CEO at Pramantha Solutions and has worked for various other companies.

== Government service ==
=== Transportation Security Administration ===
Sanders served as Assistant Administrator for the Office of Security Capabilities at the Transportation Security Administration. Prior to becoming assistant administrator for the office, he had been the deputy assistant administrator of the same office.

=== U.S. Customs and Border Protection ===
In July 2018, Sanders became Chief Operating Officer of U.S. Customs and Border Protection, and in April 2019 became Acting Commissioner of that agency.

==== Death of Carlos Gregorio Hernandez Vasquez ====
Sanders resigned on July 5, 2019, following the death of a 16-year-old unaccompanied child, Carlos Gregorio Hernandez Vasquez, in CBP custody. After the release of security footage, it was revealed that the CBP's description of how Vasquez's body was discovered was inaccurate. Following the event, the Congressional Hispanic Caucus requested that the Department of Homeland Security Office of Inspector General resolve the investigation of the matter to determine whether the CBP intentionally misrepresented the circumstances of the minor's death, and attempted to suppress video surveillance footage of the tragedy. Sanders had said that the memory will stay forever hoping that it will never be repeated. Vasquez was the fifth Guatemalan minor to die after being apprehended at the US-Mexico border since December 2019. He was diagnosed with the flu before he died. He was on his way to be reunited with family members. He had spent seven days in the custody of the Border Patrol, far longer than the 72-hour maximum required by law. After the body was found by his cell mate, CBP feigned ignorance. The footage video was shared by the local authorities.

Political offices
Preceded by Kevin McAleenan	Commissioner of U.S. Customs and Border Protection; Acting; 2019	Succeeded by Mark A. Morgan; Acting
