= The Devil's Horns (disambiguation) =

The Devil's Horns may refer to:

- Sign of the horns, a hand and two-finger gesture also called Devil's Horns, mano cornuta and corna
- "The Devil's Horns", a 1939 story from The Avenger magazine
- Operation Devil Horns, a criminal investigation by US Immigration and Customs Enforcement (2004-2008)
- Proboscidea (plant), a flowering plant sometimes known as Devil's horn and by other names
