= United States Immigration and Customs Enforcement =

Federal law enforcement agency

- ICE logo

- ICE seal

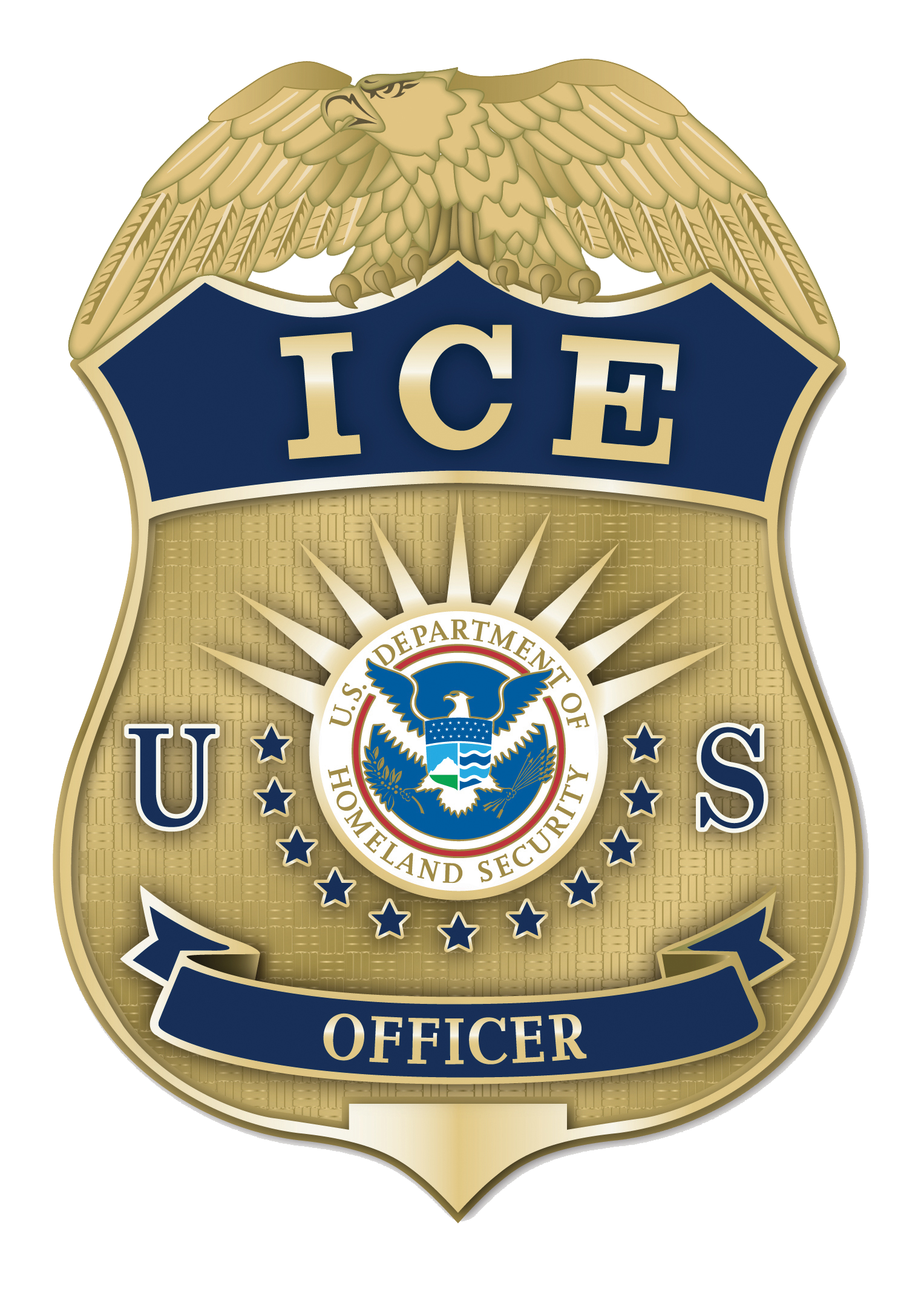
- ERO Officer badge

- Flag of ICE
- Motto: "Protecting National Security and Upholding Public Safety" "Honor, Service, Integrity" (Homeland Security Investigations)

Agency overview
- Formed: March 1, 2003 (23 years ago)
- Preceding agency: Criminal investigation resources of the United States Immigration and Naturalization Service and United States Customs Service
- Employees: 21,800+ (2025)
- Annual budget: $9.13 billion (2025)

Jurisdictional structure
- Operations jurisdiction: United States
- Specialist jurisdictions: Customs, excise, gambling; Immigration

Operational structure
- Headquarters: 500 12th Street SW; Washington, D.C., U.S.
- Agency executives: David Venturella, acting director; Charles Wall, deputy director
- Parent agency: United States Department of Homeland Security

Website
- ice.gov

United States Immigration and Customs Enforcement (ICE) is a federal law enforcement agency under the United States Department of Homeland Security. Its stated mission is to conduct criminal investigations, enforce immigration laws, preserve national security, and protect public safety. ICE was created as part of the Homeland Security Act of 2002 in the aftermath of the September 11 attacks. It absorbed the prior functions of the Immigration and Naturalization Service and the United States Customs Service.

ICE has two primary and distinct law enforcement components: Homeland Security Investigations (HSI) and Enforcement and Removal Operations (ERO). It has three supporting divisions: the Management and Program Administration, the Office of the Principal Legal Advisor (OPLA), and the Office of Professional Responsibility (OPR). ICE maintains domestic offices throughout the United States and detachments at major U.S. diplomatic missions overseas. ICE personnel (special agents and officers) do not patrol American borders; rather, that role is performed by U.S. Customs and Border Protection (CBP) and the U.S. Coast Guard. The acting director is David Venturella; the agency has not had a Senate-confirmed director since Sarah Saldaña stepped down on January 20, 2017.

ICE has been involved in multiple controversies and has been the subject of increased protests and criticism during the first and second presidencies of Donald Trump, particularly in 2018 and in 2025, with some activists calling for its abolition. Following the passage of the One Big Beautiful Bill Act in 2025, ICE became the largest and most well-funded U.S. federal law enforcement agency. Its enforcement actions, publicity campaigns, and tactics have generated public controversy and raised concerns over legality, accountability, and civil rights. Federal judges have overwhelmingly ruled against and criticized the agency's detention policies in court cases, and ICE has repeatedly disobeyed court orders. (Note: By August 2026, Politico found federal judges had overwhelmingly ruled against the agency more than 15,000 times compared to about 2,200 times it ruled in favor of the agency, with criticisms for "illegality, unconstitutionality, incompetence and cruelty". In January 2026, Chief Judge for Minnesota Patrick J. Schiltz wrote that ICE had disobeyed more federal directives in January alone than "some federal agencies have violated in their entire existence", attaching a list of 97 court orders ICE had disobeyed from 74 different immigration cases since January 1 of that year.) Following Operation Metro Surge in January 2026, during which federal agents killed civilians Renée Good and Alex Pretti, the agency has faced widespread criticism and been described by critics as an increasingly militarized police force, secret police, and paramilitary.

== Description ==
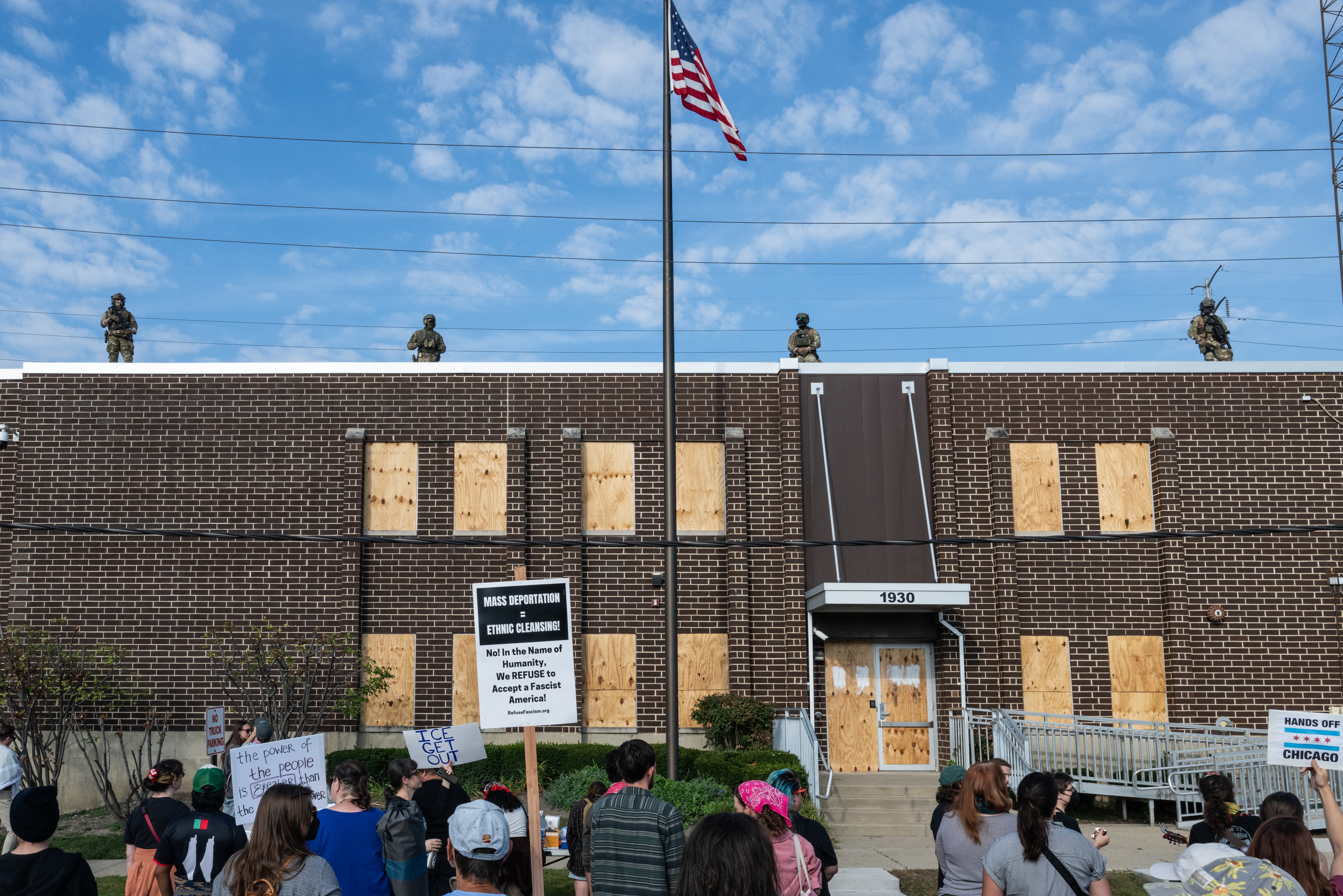
ICE agents on the roof of the Broadview ICE Facility in Illinois watch over a protest against mass deportation during Operation Midway Blitz, September 2025.

A federal law enforcement agency under the Department of Homeland Security, ICE's stated mission is "[p]rotecting America through criminal investigations and enforcing immigration laws to preserve national security and public safety". ICE enforces more than 400 federal statutes, focusing on customs violations, immigration enforcement, terrorism prevention, and trafficking.

ICE's two primary and distinct law enforcement components are:

- Homeland Security Investigations (HSI)
- Enforcement and Removal Operations (ERO)

HSI is focused on the disruption of transnational crime, whereas ERO is responsible for the apprehension, detention, deportation and removal of illegal immigrants. ERO is among the most public and contentious functions of ICE, and maintains custodial facilities used to detain people who are illegally present in the United States and pose a reasonable threat to public safety. The agency's three supporting divisions are:

- Management and Program Administration
- The Office of the Principal Legal Advisor (OPLA)
- The Office of Professional Responsibility (OPR)

Like its predecessor in immigration enforcement, the Immigration and Naturalization Service (INS), the agency and its personnel are known informally in Spanish as "la migra".

== History ==
=== Background ===
The 1876 US Supreme Court case Chy Lung v. Freeman established the power of the US federal government to set and enforce rules regarding immigration. The Immigration Act of 1891 created a commissioner of immigration in the Treasury Department. In 1903, immigration was transferred to the purview of the Department of Commerce and Labor and, after it split in 1913, to the Department of Labor. The Immigration and Naturalization Service (INS) was established in 1933. In 1940, with increasing concern about national security, services relating to immigration and naturalization were organized under the authority of the Department of Justice.

=== Origins and initial activities ===
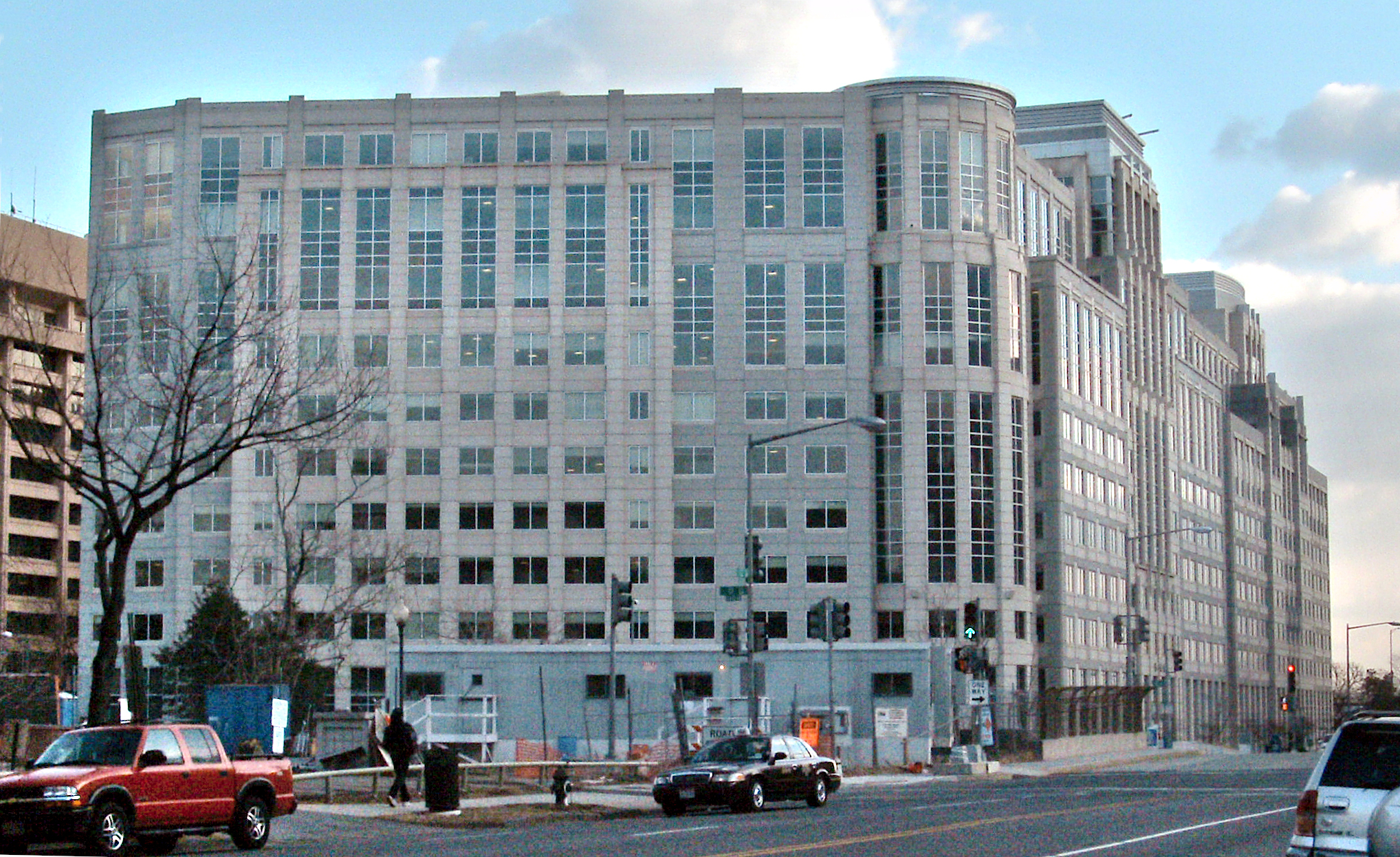
ICE headquarters building in Washington, D.C., 2009

The Immigration and Naturalization Service (under the Justice Department) and the United States Customs Service (under the Treasury Department) were dissolved on March 1, 2003, when the Homeland Security Act of 2002 transferred most of their functions to three new entities—United States Citizenship and Immigration Services (USCIS), U.S. Immigration and Customs Enforcement (ICE), and U.S. Customs and Border Protection (CBP)—within the newly created United States Department of Homeland Security (DHS), as part of a major government reorganization following the September 11 attacks of 2001. ICE is the largest investigative arm of the Department of Homeland Security and a contributor to the FBI's Joint Terrorism Task Force. The agency operates with a significant budget and workforce.

The agencies that were either moved entirely or merged in part into ICE included:

- The criminal investigative and intelligence resources of the United States Customs Service
- The criminal investigative, detention and deportation resources of the Immigration and Naturalization Service
- The Federal Protective Service

The Federal Protective Service was later transferred from ICE to the National Protection and Programs Directorate effective October 28, 2009. In 2003, Asa Hutchinson moved the Federal Air Marshals Service from the Transportation Security Administration (TSA) to ICE, but Michael Chertoff moved them back to the TSA in 2005.

In February 2005, ICE began Operation Community Shield, a national law enforcement initiative that targets violent transnational street gangs through the use of ICE's broad law enforcement powers, including the unique and powerful authority to remove criminal immigrants, including illegal immigrants and legal permanent residents.

=== Obama administration ===
Between 2009 and 2016, the Obama administration oversaw the deporting of a record 2.4 million illegal immigrants who had entered the United States, earning him the nickname "deporter-In-chief" by Janet Murguía, the president of National Council of La Raza. According to ICE data, about 40% of those deported by ICE in 2015 had no criminal conviction, while a majority of those convicted were guilty of minor charges. Statistics of record deportations were partly due to a change in how deportations were counted that began during the Bush administration and continued under the Obama administration.

=== 2017–2021: First Trump administration ===
==== Leadership ====
ICE had seven acting directors during the first Trump administration:

- Tom Homan - from January 2017 to June 2018. Nominated for permanent position in November 2017.
- Ronald Vitiello - from June 2018 to April 2019. Nominated for permanent position in August 2018.
- Matthew Albence - from April 2019 to May 2019, and again from July 2019 to August 2020.
- Mark A. Morgan - from May 2019 to July 2019.
- Tony Pham - from August 2020 to December 2020.
- Jonathan Fahey - from December 2020 to January 2021.
- Tae Johnson - from January 13, 2021 to January 20, 2021 (Trump administration); continued as acting director in the Biden administration (see below).

==== Actions ====
Following a presidential campaign that centered immigration policy, Donald Trump enacted in his first presidency (2017–2021) a hardline immigration policy intended to reduce immigration. Shortly after taking office, he signed an executive order to increase ICE's staffing by 10,000 people, and to vastly expand ICE's immigration enforcement powers. While ICE largely prioritized people charged with serious crimes during the Obama administration, Trump's first administration directed the agency to target anybody it believed had entered the United States illegally. Subsequently, the number of encounters and arrests performed by ICE increased substantially, including the encounters and arrests of U.S. citizens. ICE began engaging in high-profile raids at places of employment, places of worship, and places of education. By 2020, growing numbers of Democratic lawmakers and progressive figures called for the abolition of ICE and an overhaul of the United States immigration system due to ICE's controversial practices.

In 2018, a total of 19 HSI special agents in charge or SACs (who are the senior most officials in each investigative division) sent a letter to DHS secretary Kirstjen Nielsen and asked to be formally separated from ICE. These 19 SACs explained that HSI's investigative mission was repeatedly being hamstrung by ICE's civil immigration enforcement mission, saying that many jurisdictions limited their co-operation with HSI because of its linkage to the politically charged activity of ICE's Enforcement and Removal Operations (ERO), which is also housed under ICE. These senior leaders requested HSI be restructured as a stand-alone agency analogous to the Secret Service. It was also stated "No U.S. Department of Justice law enforcement agency is paired with another disparate entity, i.e., the FBI is not paired with the Bureau of Prisons or DEA." This letter was ultimately ignored by the administration.

==== Protests ====
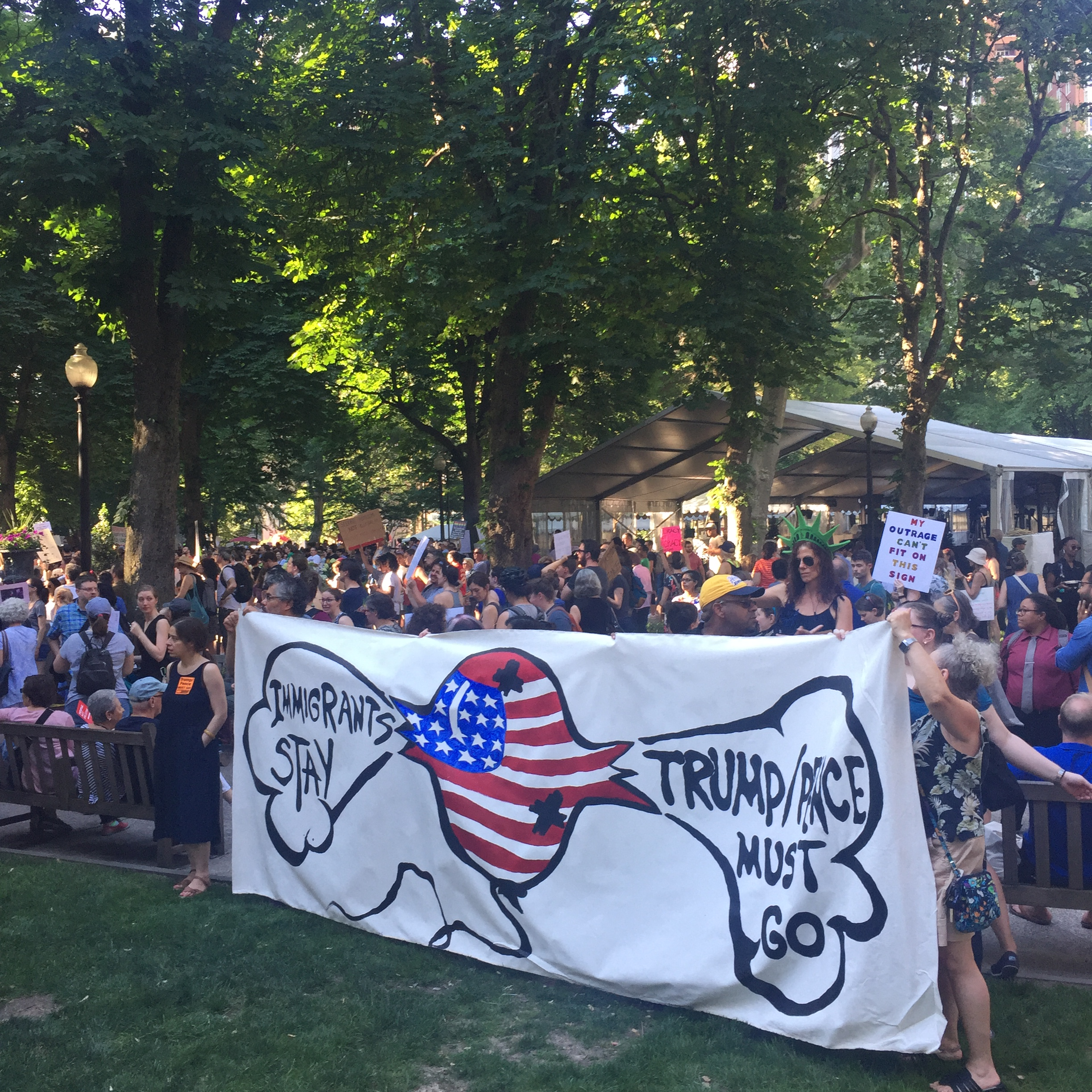
A protest against ICE in Philadelphia, June 2018

Numerous protests emerged across the nation in response to the first Trump administration's ICE policies. Many of the protesters occupied areas around ICE facilities in hopes of disrupting operations. The Occupy ICE movement began on June 17, 2018, outside Portland, Oregon. It initially began as a vigil for the people suffering from ICE policies but spontaneously grew into a larger movement as more people showed up. The movement ultimately spread into other major cities like Philadelphia, San Francisco, San Diego, and New York. As the movement grew, they faced counter protesters and arrests. As Occupy ICE groups spread to different cities, there was also a greater amount of coordination between them.

Other grassroots protests sprung up across the nation as well. On August 1, 2019, a month-long peaceful protest event was started outside the San Francisco ICE office, where protesters beat drums and demanded that family separation at the border be stopped. In addition to blocking ICE facilities, protesters are also protesting technology companies such as Microsoft for providing technology to aid ICE. One such instance of this was the sit-in at the Microsoft store on 5th Avenue in NYC led by Close the Camps NYC on September 14, 2019. In the 2020 protests and riots in Portland, Oregon, the local ICE office had its window broken.

=== 2021–2025: Biden administration ===
The Biden administration retained Johnson as acting director of ICE; Johnson retired in July 2023. In April 2021, Biden had nominated Ed Gonzalez for the position of director of ICE; Gonzalez withdrew in June 2022 when it was clear that the Senate would not confirm the nomination. Johnson was followed as acting director by Patrick Lechleitner, who held that position until the end of the administration.

During Biden's presidency, approximately 4 million removals and expulsions were recorded at the U.S.–Mexico border. The totals included multiple crossings made by the same individuals, particularly during the COVID-19 pandemic.

Despite the Biden administrations Priority Enforcement Program, the American Immigration Council found, from February to November 2021, nearly half (49.8 percent) of detainers were carried out against people in the "other" category, nearly a third (33.2 percent) of arrests fell under the "other" category and 23.4 percent of removals were also classified as "other." As of October 2023, ICE held approximately 30,000 individuals in detention facilities across the United States.

ICE's increasing use of solitary confinement under Biden was criticized.

=== 2025–present: Second Trump administration ===
The number of people arrested by ICE increased in the second term of Donald Trump, expanding to include greater numbers who had no criminal record.

==== Leadership ====
To date, ICE has had three acting directors during the second Trump administration:

- Caleb Vitello, who was nominated in December 2024 for the permanent position of ICE director, and was the acting director from January to February 2025.
- Todd Lyons, from March 2025 to May 2026.
- David Venturella - from June 1, 2026, to the present.

In late June 2026, Lance Schroyer was nominated to fill the director's role permanently, with Venturella to remain as acting director until Schroyer's confirmation by the Senate.

To all ICE officers: You have federal immunity in the conduct of your duties. Anybody who lays a hand on you or tries to stop you or tries to obstruct you is committing a felony.

You have immunity to perform your duties, and no one — no city official, no state official, no illegal alien, no leftist agitator or domestic insurrectionist — can prevent you from fulfilling your legal obligations and duties. The Department of Justice has made clear that if officials cross that line into obstruction, into criminal conspiracy against the United States or against ICE officers, then they will face justice.

–Stephen Miller, White House deputy chief of staff, on October 24, 2025 responding to the suggestion that the State of Illinois could pursue criminal charges against ICE agents involved in Operation Midway Blitz

==== Recruitment ====
During the second presidency of Donald Trump, the United States Immigration and Customs Enforcement (ICE) significantly increased recruiting efforts. They are attempting to hire 10,000 new employees in 2026, up from 20,000 employees in December 2025, and have allocated $100 million in one year to what they have referred to as a "wartime recruitment" campaign.

The Department of Homeland Security (DHS) and the White House have posted recruitment ads to TikTok, X, and Instagram, and they purchased ad space to promote ICE on Hulu, HBO Max, Snapchat, Spotify, and YouTube. Their recruitment efforts have used memes and online influencers to promote ICE deportations, and they have used a geotargeted advertising targeting people who attended UFC fights, listened to patriotic podcasts, or had shown an interest in guns and tactical gear. Some ads used white nationalist slogans.

==== Initial actions ====
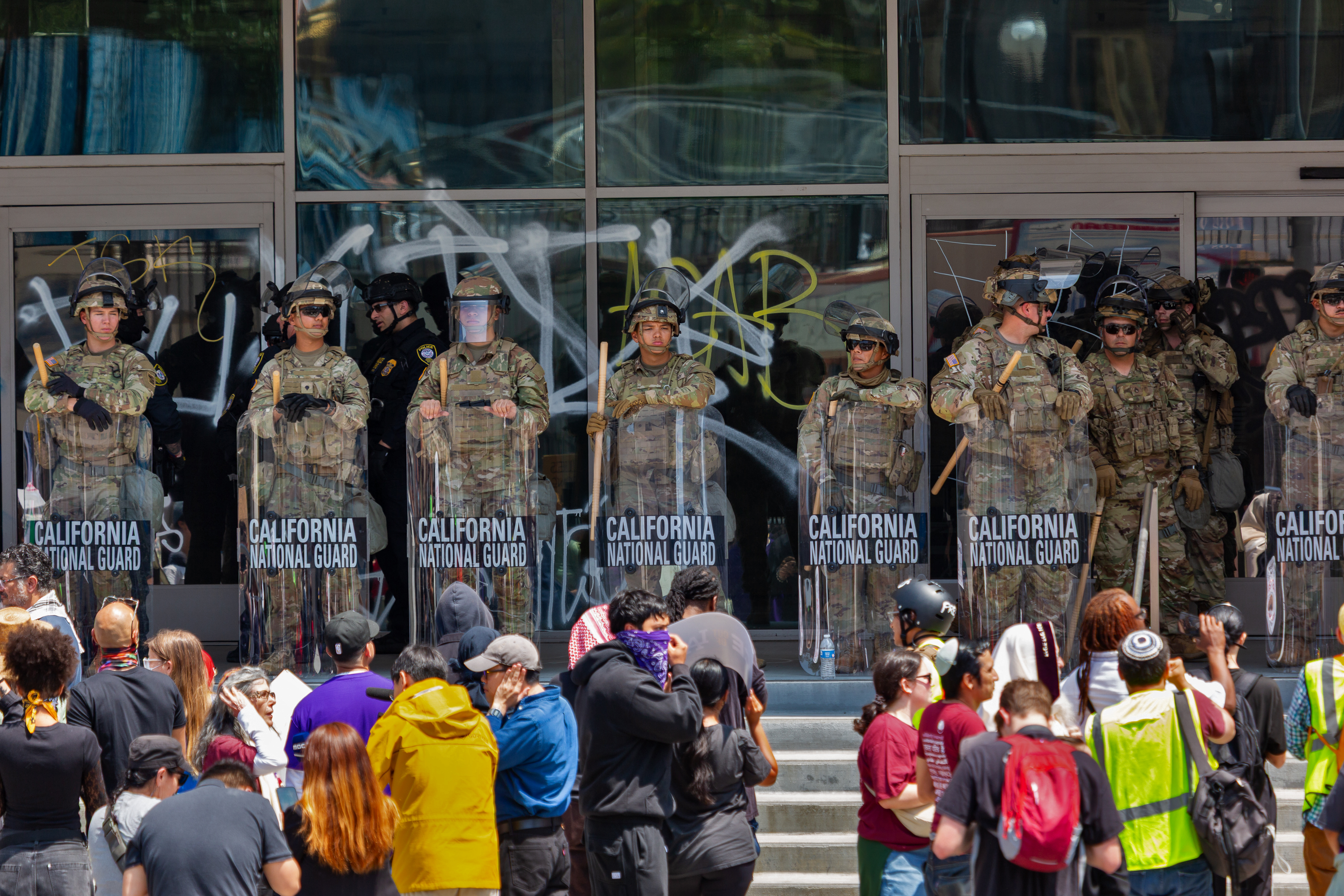
California National Guard with riot shields at June 2025 Los Angeles protests against ICE and mass deportation.

Plainclothes ICE agents apprehending Rümeysa Öztürk off the street in Somerville, Massachusetts for an op-ed she co-wrote for The Tufts Daily.

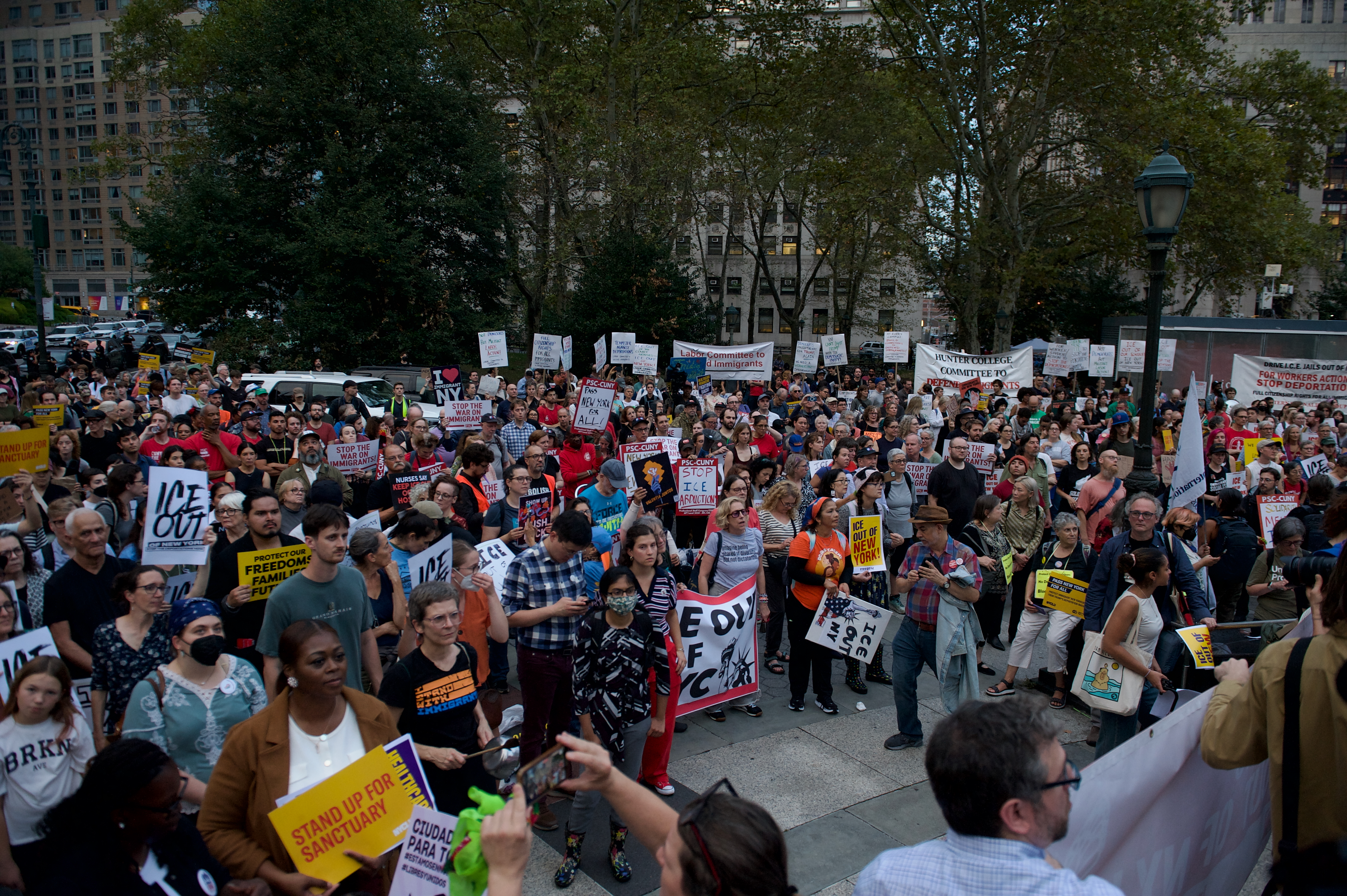
People at Federal Plaza in Manhattan protesting against ICE and mass deportation in the second presidency of Donald Trump, September 2025.

ICE again came to the forefront during the second presidency of Donald Trump, as Trump once again imposed a hardline immigration policy. Trump's administration enacted a major wave of deportations, On January 22, the DHS announced the administration was rolling back an Obama-era directive that had protected migrants in sensitive areas such as hospitals, places of worship, courtrooms, funerals, weddings and schools, giving rise to fears that certain sectors, such as the food industry, might lack workers. Two days later, acting Homeland Security Secretary Benjamine Huffman said the agency would deport people admitted into the United States temporarily by the Biden administration. The U.S. military was deployed to assist ICE in multiple states. The administration has used the Alien Enemies Act to quickly deport individuals subject to removal under the AEA with limited or no due process, and to be imprisoned in El Salvador. Several American citizens were detained and deported. Administration practices have faced legal issues and stoked controversy with lawyers, judges, and legal scholars. The Trump administration began setting daily targets for ICE arrests, and engaged in a controversial campaign to increase the visibility of ICE's arrests. Some have stated that ICE during this time has been targeting "Hispanic looking" people, and federal courts have found the agency to be engaged in racial profiling.

In the first couple of months of the second Trump administration, several people died in ICE custody. Demonstrations emerged nationwide in 2025 against ICE's immigration enforcement activity and policies, including the June 2025 Los Angeles protests. Legal and law enforcement experts described ICE's use of plainclothes arrests as resulting in a spike of ICE impersonators being arrested across the country.

Within Trump's One Big Beautiful Bill Act, signed into law on July 4, 2025, the U.S. government allocated unprecedented funding to ICE for detention facilities, deportation operations, and additional funds to hire new agents. The bill allocates ICE with more funding than any federal law enforcement agency in U.S. history and more than the federal prison system. As a result, recruitment incentives included a $50,000 sign on bonus and $60,000 college loan forgiveness for sworn police officers.

By July 2025, multiple polls showed a majority of Americans disapproved of the agency, with strongly negative public opinion that surpassed prior negative opinion of it during the 2018 "Abolish ICE" movement. In late August, the Pew Research Center reported that its polls showed an increasingly sharp partisan divide in views of ICE, with 72% of Republican Party supporters viewing the agency favorably, and 78% of Democratic Party supporters viewing it negatively.

In 2025, two notable incidents targeted ICE facilities in Texas. This included the July 4, 2025 Alvarado ICE facility incident, and the 2025 Dallas ICE facility shooting where a shooter killed one detainee and critically injured two others before killing himself. One of the injured victims died six days later.

By November 2025, at least half of ICE's top leadership had been fired or reassigned, and many were replaced with Border Patrol officials. The Chicago Tribune described the shakeup as part of the Trump administration's desire to increase deportations at all costs, noting that Border Patrol's methods were less targeted than ICE's and involved stopping random people on the street and demanding to know their birthplace and citizenship status.

In late November, ICE began conducting a series of immigration raids in New Orleans, Louisiana which drew public attention and controversy.

As of December 2025, ICE held 68,440 people in detention, nearly 40,000 of whom had no criminal record or only pending charges. Between January and December 2025 the administration had arrested over 328,000 people and deported nearly 327,000.

On July 7, 2026, during an enforcement operation in Houston, Texas, an agent with U.S. Immigration and Customs Enforcement (ICE) fatally shot Lorenzo Salgado Araújo, a 52‑year‑old Mexican national. The shooting took place while Salgado Araújo was driving a van carrying his construction crew. In the days that followed, community members organized protests in Houston to demand accountability. Local elected officials and civic organizations also called for an independent review of the circumstances surrounding the killing, expressing concerns about public confidence in ICE in light of the agency's recent record. The Mexican government, for its part, announced that it would pursue criminal complaints in the United States related to the deaths of Mexican citizens who have died in ICE custody or during ICE operations—a response that encompassed this case as well as other similar incidents.

==== 2026 killings of American citizens and immigrants ====
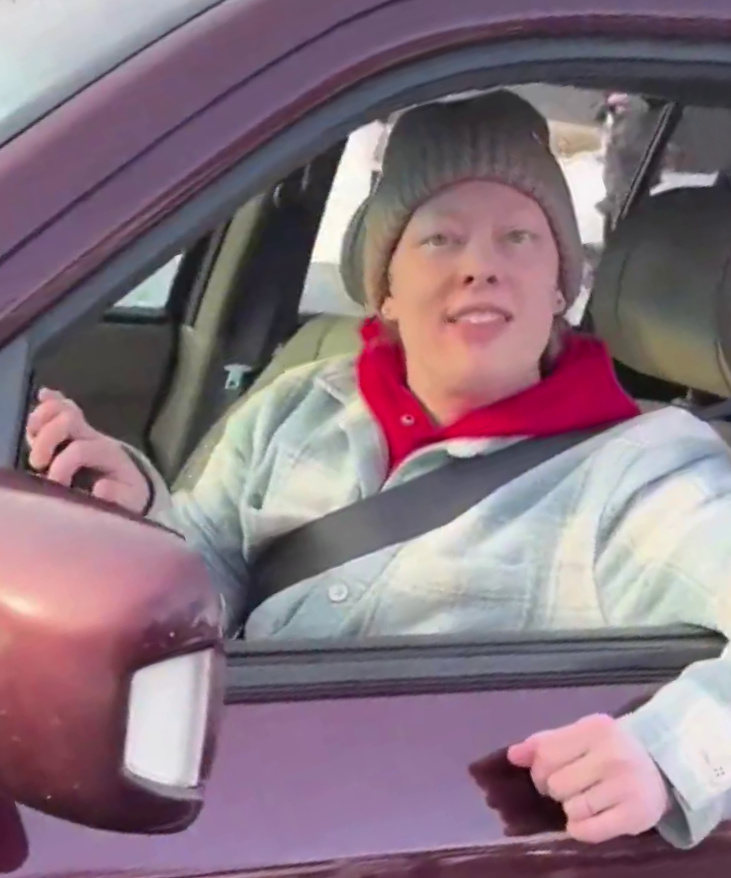
Renée Nicole Good

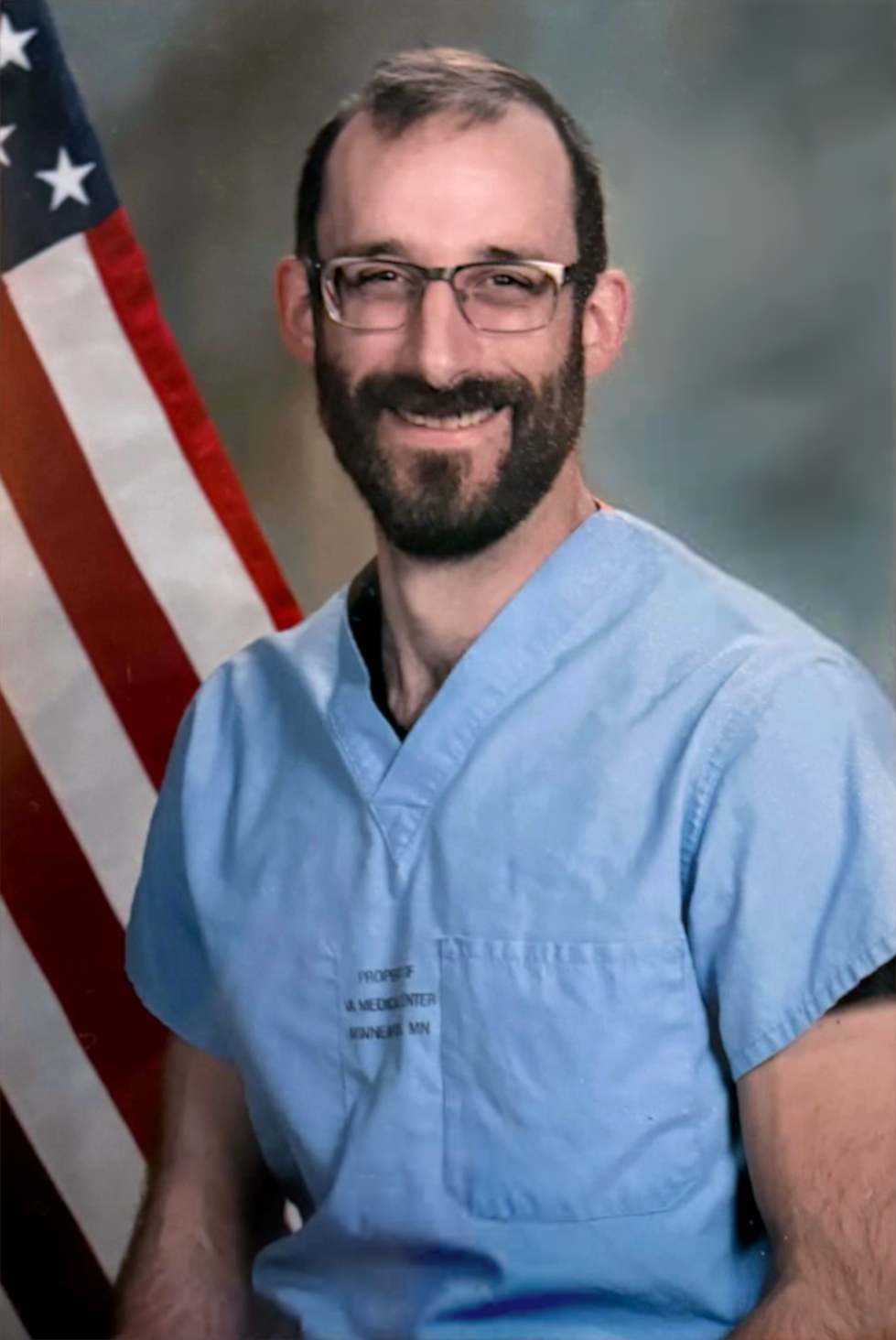
Alex Pretti

In January 2026, federal agents shot and killed two US citizens, Renée Good and Alex Pretti, leading to extensive criticism of the agency.

Beginning in December 2025, ICE began Operation Metro Surge in Minnesota, which was characterized by local police and journalists as an escalation in the severity and brutality of ICE tactics, harassment and threats against observers, the detention of US citizens, and the arrest of 3,000 people.

On January 7, 2026, an ICE officer shot and killed 37-year-old Renée Nicole Good during an incident in Minneapolis, Minnesota, creating considerable added controversy during protests over ICE enforcement actions. A January 22, 2026, nationwide Times/Sinema poll found 63% of Americans thought that as a whole, ICE as an agency had gone "too far".

On January 24, 2026, ICU nurse Alex Pretti was pepper-sprayed, restrained, shot and killed by DHS agents after he attempted to protect a woman who had been shoved to the ground by federal agents. This event transpired at a time when public demonstrations against the Trump administration's immigration enforcement policies were widespread. Government statements in the aftermath stoked added controversy by making claims that contradict video footage taken by other protestors. A January 28 Fox News poll found 58% of Americans thought ICE was "too aggressive", up 10 points since July 2025. Following the killings, Democratic officials in Congress made attempts to reform ICE and CBP, although they were opposed by Republicans.

In July 2026, ICE temporarily suspended most traffic stops following two killings within a single week, including the killing of Joan Sebastián Durán Guerrero in Maine which sparked large protests. The Associated Press reported the ICE agent involved in the killing was a new hire who had "a history of terrifying and violent behavior" and "serious mental health issues since early childhood", which prompted scrutiny of ICE's vetting during its rapid hiring spree and reduced training for officers.

==== Conflicts with the judiciary ====
In response to 2025 ICE raids in Los Angeles, Judge Maame Ewusi-Mensah Frimpong in Noem v. Vasquez Perdomo forbid ICE from engaging in racial profiling. ICE ignored the order to stop its activities in LA before the Supreme Court of the United States removed Frimpong's order through its shadow docket. In November 2025, Judge Sara L. Ellis found statements by federal immigration officials defending use of force during Operation Midway Blitz in Chicago involving "widespread misrepresentations" that "call into question everything that defendants say they are doing in their characterization". In January 2026, Chief Judge for Minnesota Patrick J. Schiltz wrote that ICE had disobeyed more federal directives in January alone than "some federal agencies have violated in their entire existence", attaching a list of 97 court orders ICE had disobeyed from 74 different immigration cases since January 1 of that year. A Reuters review of six violent encounters found ICE officials making statements that were later contradicted by video and other evidence in court. CNN reported that DHS/ICE had "made claims that were later undermined by video, other evidence, local police and/or judges" in "many" cases it brought before the court. The Los Angeles Times reported that ICE's "loss of credibility" had resulted in repeated losses in court cases. By February 2026, The New York Times reported "federal judges have found that the Trump administration has been ignoring longstanding legal interpretations that mandate the release of many people who are taken into immigration custody if they post a bond", resulting in lawsuits and many releases. By August 2026, federal judges had overwhelmingly rejected ICE's mass detention policy, with over 15,000 cases from judges ruling against the agency and criticizing it for "illegality, unconstitutionality, incompetence and cruelty".

===== Claims of vehicular attacks =====
ICE has frequently accused immigrants and protestors of "weaponizing" their vehicles to assault federal officers in its justification of arrests and shootings, with DHS claiming a "3,300% increase in vehicle attacks" during Trump's second term. A July 2026 investigation by The Guardian found that in 26 cases involving alleged "vehicular attacks" promoted by DHS, only one resulted in an assault conviction. It wrote that:

The review of cases also reveals a pattern of DHS blasting statements to the press and on social media, painting the subjects of their traffic stops as violent assailants without evidence and then failing to correct the record when those claims collapse under basic scrutiny.

In August 2026, media outlets reported on a video showing an ICE agent pointing a gun at a woman in her car after she shouted at them, with the agent accusing her of trying to run him over. In a press release, DHS claimed that "an anti-ICE agitator" had attempted to "harm officers by weaponizing her vehicle against them". A CNN and New York Times analysis determined that dashcam and cell phone video contradicted ICE's claim and showed them encircling her car with vehicles after she shouted the insults. Days later, Virginia Representatives Don Beyer and Suhas Subramanyam announced a congressional investigation into the incident.

==== Protests and criticism ====
Anti-ICE protest in Manhattan the day after Renée Good was killed, protesters chant "Abolish ICE!"

ICE's aggressive policing tactics and arrests by masked agents in public areas were frequently captured on cameras by bystanders, often leading to accusations of "kidnapping" and were criticized as intentionally seeking to spread fear. ICE's use of masks and balaclavas, military-style tactical gear, and lack of visible identification and uniforms were criticized as intimidation tactics and raised concerns over a lack of accountability. ICE has been widely criticized as acting like a secret police, detaining people without charge. The Guardian described criticism of ICE that portrayed it as being a "rogue agency" that does Trump's bidding. It described the lines between federal law enforcement and Trump's private armed force as becoming blurred. It wrote:

In the public consciousness, ICE has become defined as Trump's personal rogue agency doing his bidding regardless of accepted norms and laws. They have become a kind of domestic enforcer for Maga's agenda, rounding up "illegals" and deporting what they say are criminals to El Salvador, to face justice in a place without trials. When Trump promised "retribution" in the lead-up to his second presidency, activists say these are now the soldiers carrying it out.

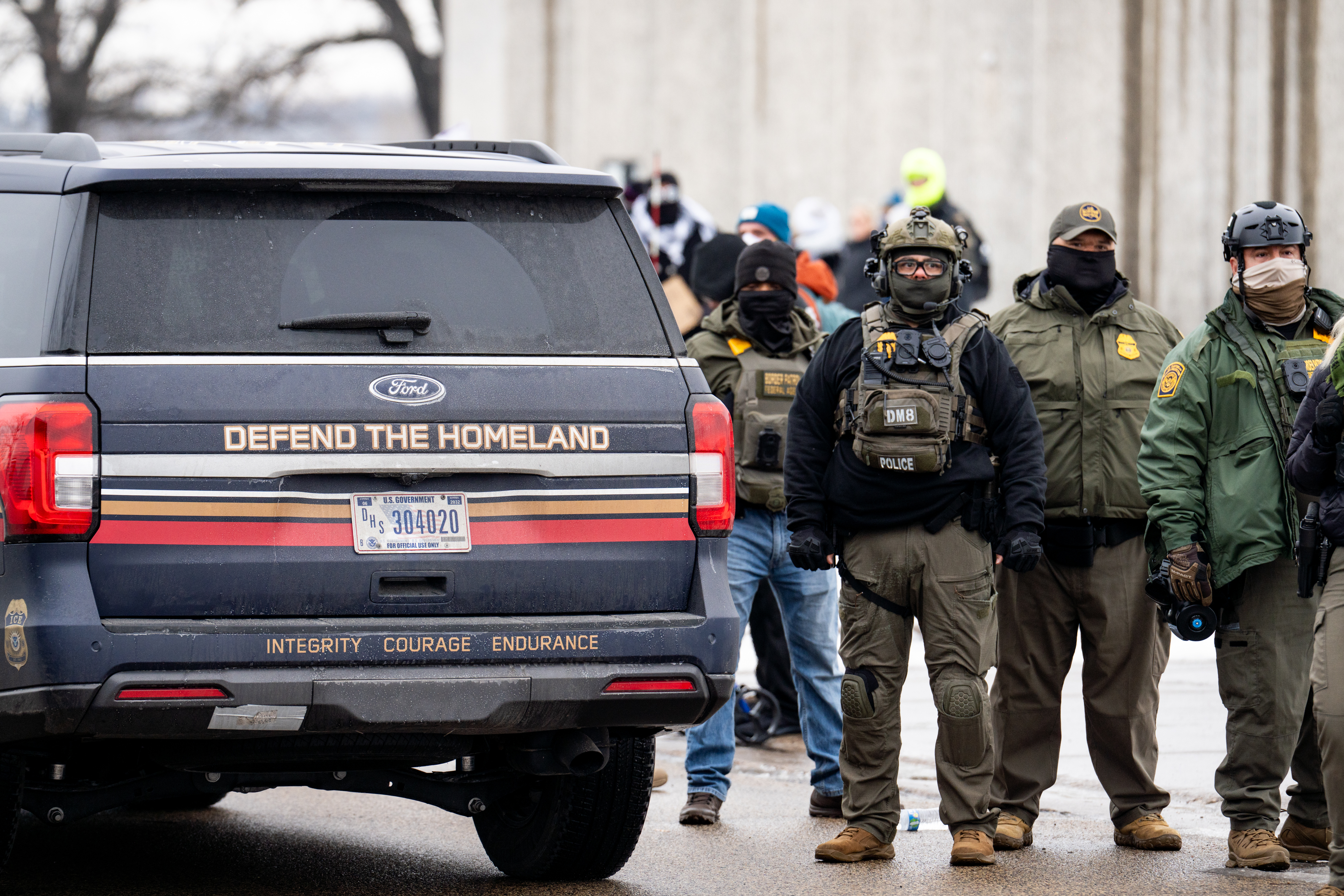
CBP and ICE officers in front of an ICE vehicle in Minneapolis on January 8, 2026

The Atlantic described ICE's lowering of recruitment standards, such as reducing the age to join to 18 years among other efforts as resulting in new recruits "seeing the position not as a federal-law-enforcement career but as a chance to serve as a foot soldier in Trump's mission to bring sweeping social and demographic change"; describing its rapid buildup as a result of Trump officials wanting to "change the agency's character by flooding it with new hires who are inspired by MAGA ideology rather than by the typical perks of a federal badge". It also highlighted existing conservative ICE agents worried that "a historic chance to reform the agency will be squandered by incompetence and shady deals with well-connected contractors".

Existing ICE agents interviewed by The Atlantic and Reuters described low-morale from overwork, describing them as being "vilified by broad swaths of the public and bullied by Trump officials demanding more and more". Agents within ICE's HSI division criticized the shelving of new cases on drugs, human smuggling, and child exploitation in order to make immigration-enforcement arrests. Several career officers were pushed out of leadership roles or quit among several purges of staff. Some ICE officers were described as being "thrilled" by recent changes and the ability to not worry about being too aggressive, while others were disturbed of videos of "officers smashing suspects' car windows and appearing to round up people indiscriminately" as making ICE a "caricature" of itself.

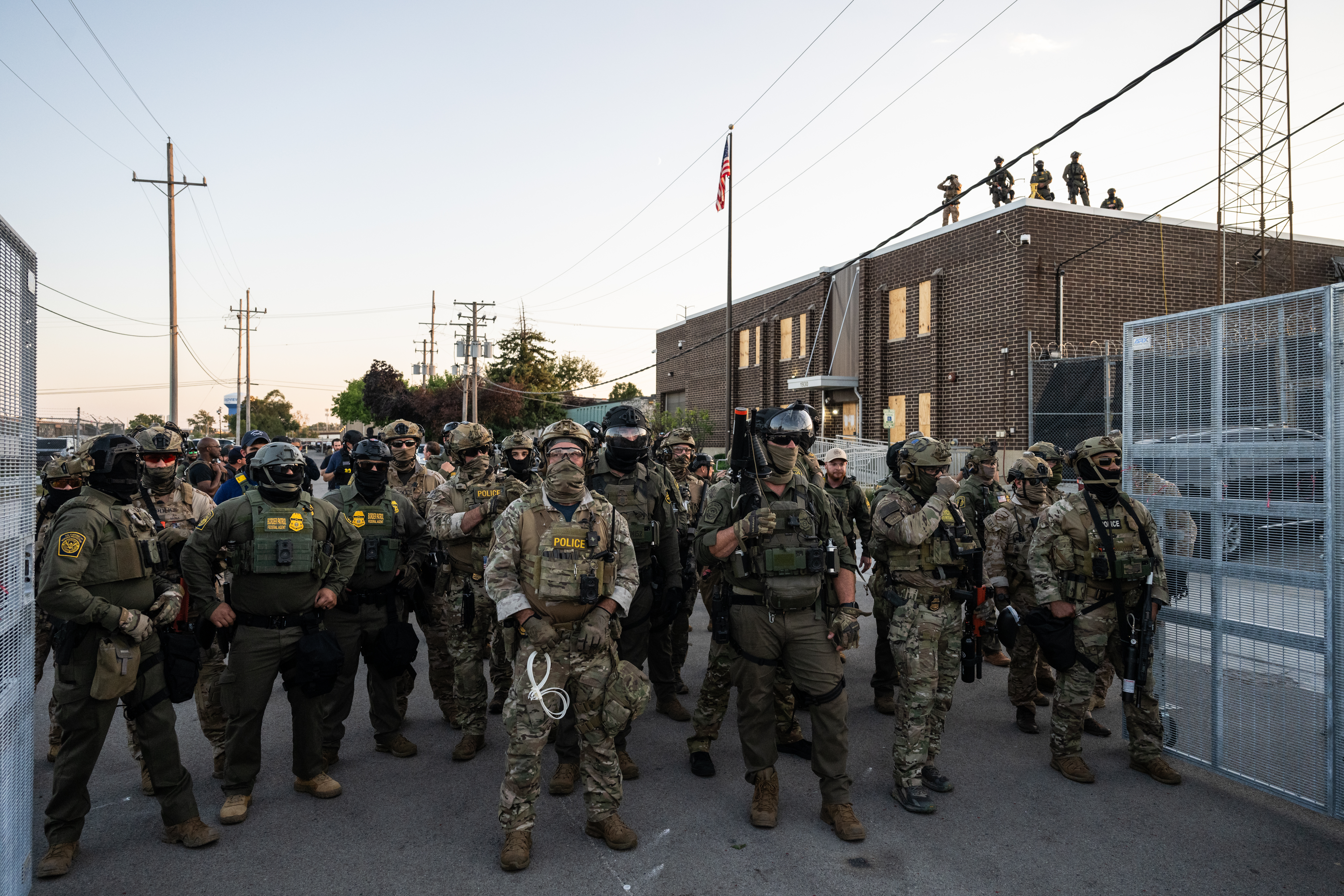
CBP and ICE officers in front of the Broadview ICE Facility in Broadview, Illinois in 2025.

Writing for Politico, Joshua Zeitz described ICE as transforming "into a massive, un-uniformed, masked domestic army" that "critics fear will have carte blanche to arrest, detain and deport persons without cause or due process, whether they enjoy legal status or not". He added that its aggressive tactics risked backfiring on the administration, and compared increasing agitation over immigration arrests to violent responses among previously uninterested citizens following the passage of the Fugitive Slave Act of 1850.

ICE agents received criticism for having detained and imprisoned foreigners at the border with delayed explanation and legal counsel, and in one incident harassed and handcuffed Brad Lander, an opposition politician who was attempting to accompany a man out of a courtroom.

The Economist summarized criticism of the growth of ICE and its true motivations, writing that:

Indeed, the explosive growth of immigration-enforcement agencies seemingly answerable only to Mr Trump has prompted agitated critics to assert that he is creating a paramilitary to cow his political enemies and perhaps even to help rig the midterm elections in November. Mr Trump once urged a mob to storm the Capitol to try to overturn the result of an election he lost, after all. This year, the argument runs, he could claim that immigrants are trying to vote illegally, post menacing ICE agents at polling stations and so frighten Democrat-supporting ethnic minorities into staying at home.

The Economist described ICE's focus on targeting left-leaning and Democratic cities as political, punitive, and not based in immigration enforcement, noting that many cities and states targeted by ICE were not those with the highest percentages of illegal immigrants. Criminologist Geoffrey Alpert described the focus as having "now turned from professional policing to politics". The Economist described a "more obvious interpretation" from left-leaning criticism of ICE as wanting to provoke protestors to violence, "thereby justifying the deployment of federal agents and strengthening the case for a crackdown". White House deputy chief of staff Stephen Miller's description of peaceful protestors as "insurrectionists" and "domestic terrorists" was described as a potential prelude to invoking the Insurrection Act. ICE is not constrained by the Posse Comitatus Act.

===== Paramilitary comparisons =====
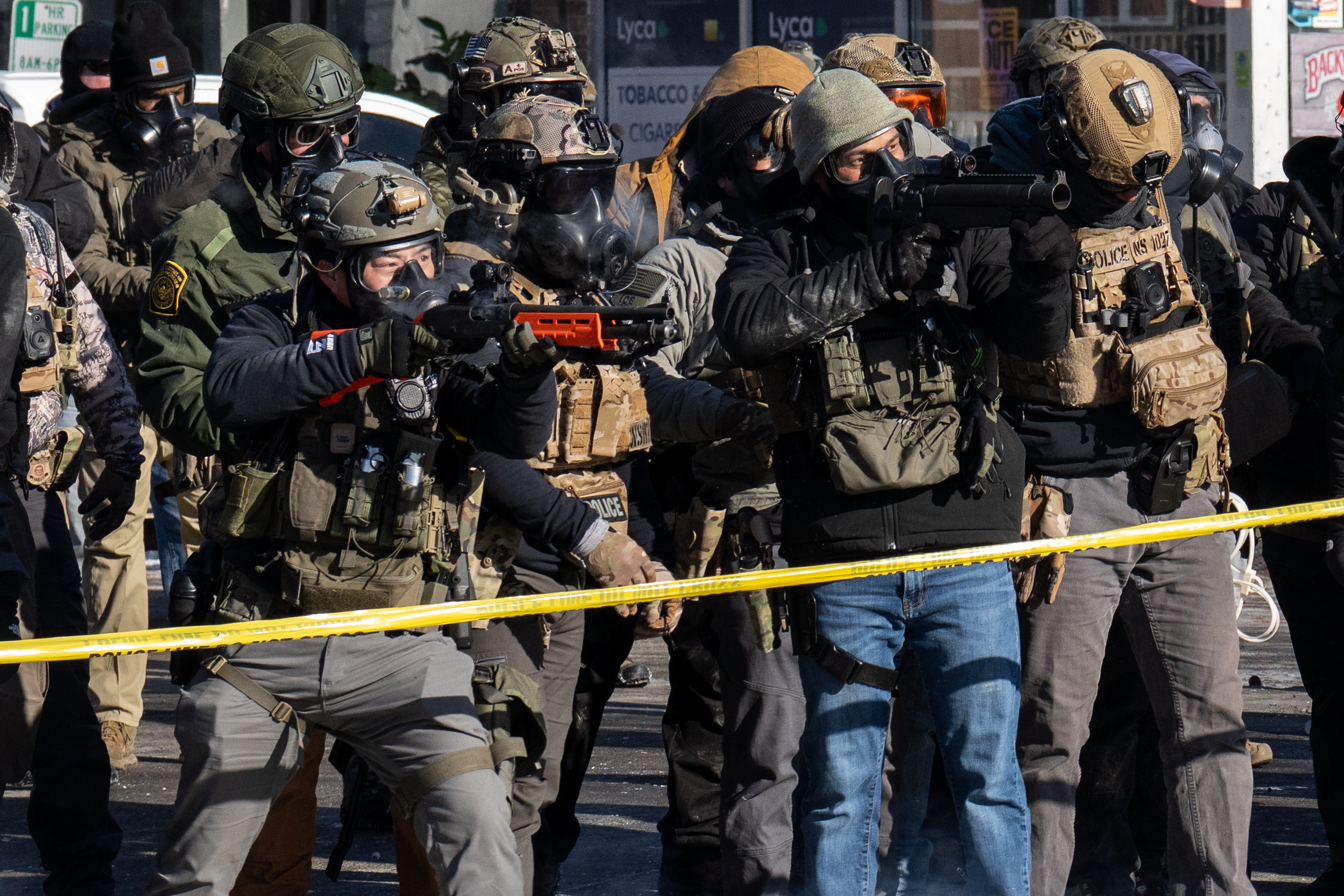
ICE and Border Patrol agents on Nicollet Avenue on January 24, 2026, pointing less-lethals at a crowd of protestors.

By January 2026, politicians, journalists, and scholars have increasingly called ICE a paramilitary force.

Writing for The Conversation, associate professor Erica De Bruin on policing and state security forces stated that ICE fit the first description of a paramilitary as "highly militarized police forces" with "military-grade weapons and equipment" for domestic policing, and partly met the second description of a paramilitary as being "repressive political agents". She described ICE as operating with less oversight owing to exemptions from constitutional amendments prohibiting unreasonable search and seizure; acting in more "overtly political ways" such as being deployed against political opponents in non-immigration contexts through policing protests; and that ICE's union endorsed Trump in 2020 with 95% of its members in agreement and was targeting new recruits with far-right messaging. Political scientist Elizabeth F. Cohen found that ICE has gathered data to "surveil citizens' political beliefs and activities—including protest actions they have taken on issues as far afield as gun control—in addition to immigrants' rights."

The Economist has described ICE as a paramilitary force and "presidential militia". It compared ICE as the latest example of a long history of paramilitary forces and violence in America, highlighting the Texas Rangers' 1918 Porvenir massacre, Grover Cleveland's use of the Army during the Pullman Strike of 1894, the Pinkerton Detective Agency of the 19th and 20th centuries, and the Ku Klux Klan during the Reconstruction era; but stated none of the prior groups were as big, well-equipped or as organized as ICE.

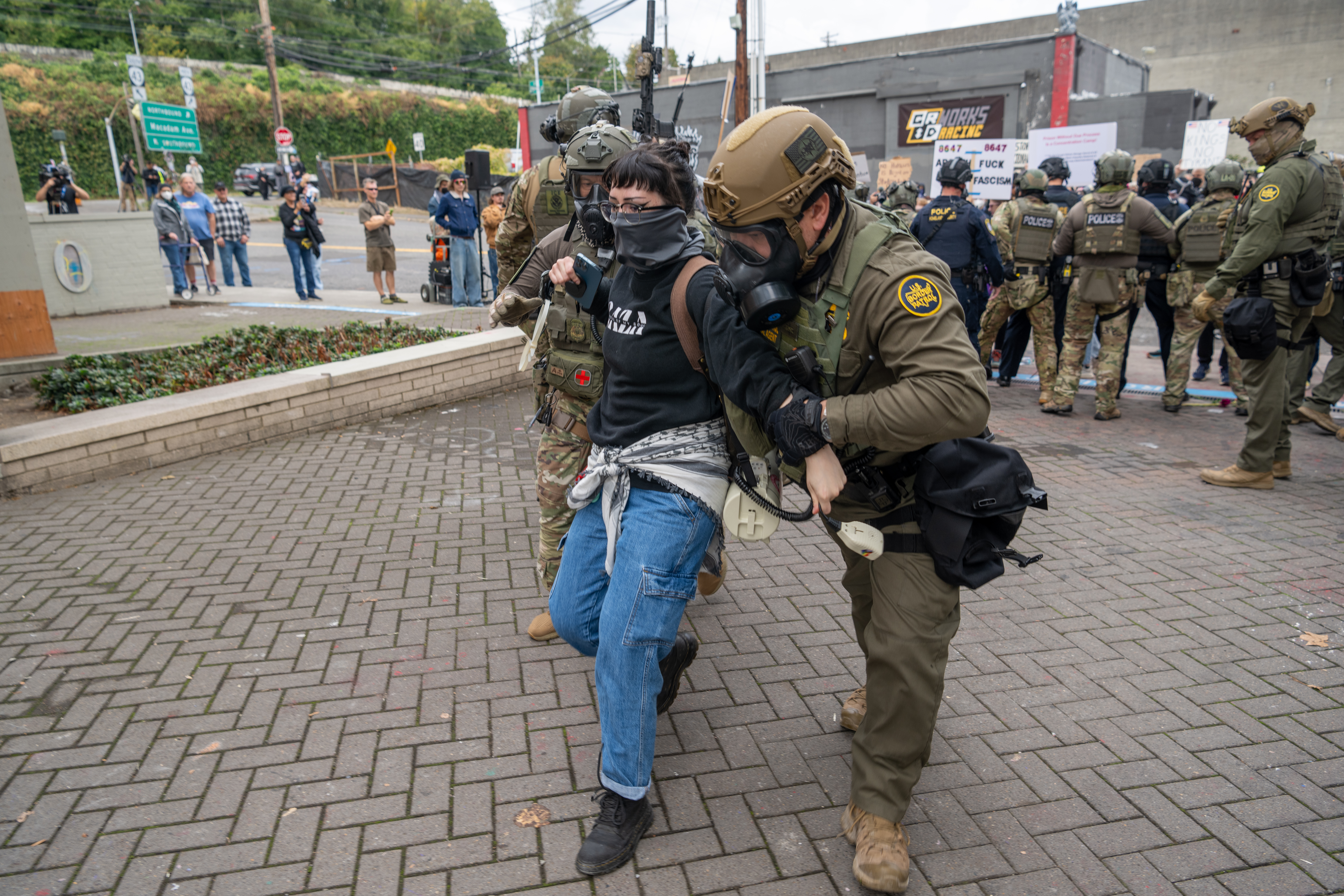
CBP and ICE detain a protester outside an ICE facility on October 4, 2025, in Portland, Oregon.

Ishaan Tharoor of The Washington Post wrote that comparisons of ICE to a paramilitary had "wrought unflattering comparisons abroad to unaccountable paramilitary forces" abroad; writing that: "analysts see the expansion of a new "paramilitary" force more aligned with the political dispensation in Washington". It described foreigners as having increasingly compared ICE to an interior ministry, with former national security, CIA and DHS official Steven Cash writing that DHS and "Its sprawling law-enforcement elements have been remade into a paramilitary force: heavily armed, lightly restrained, and increasingly insulated from meaningful oversight" and that immigration enforcement "has been transformed from a regulatory and investigative function into a domestic security apparatus operating in American communities with a posture that looks far less like civilian law enforcement and far more like internal security services abroad."

Writing for The Atlantic, Anne Applebaum compared ICE to "a type of national police force, backed, in some cases, by soldiers from the National Guard" and "a masked and heavily armed paramilitary". Margy O'Harron at NYU's Brennan Center for Justice said that:

What we now see is a very heavy, militarized law-enforcement presence with very little oversight. You've got ICE agents and their law-enforcement partners using—they're dressed like military soldiers. They are using military weapons. They are rappelling from Black Hawk helicopters. They're using flash-bang grenades to clear out buildings. They're zip-tying the elderly, children as a way of evacuating a building. These are tools that are used by armed soldiers against enemies—not that we use against civilians.

Wired described ICE's special response teams (SRT), CBP's one SRT, and the Border Patrol Tactical Unit (BORTAC) as "paramilitary tactical units" that "behave not like local police, but instead like special forces in Iraq, Afghanistan, or other far-flung battlefields from the Forever Wars of the past quarter century." A New York Times investigation found that ICE and CBP units regularly used military equipment in non-threatening, day-to-day operations. It highlighted the use of suppressors, MAWLs, M-LOK rails, dump pouches, RCM magwells, and with "helmets, camouflage and tactical gear" that "all look straight from the battlefield".

===== Protests =====
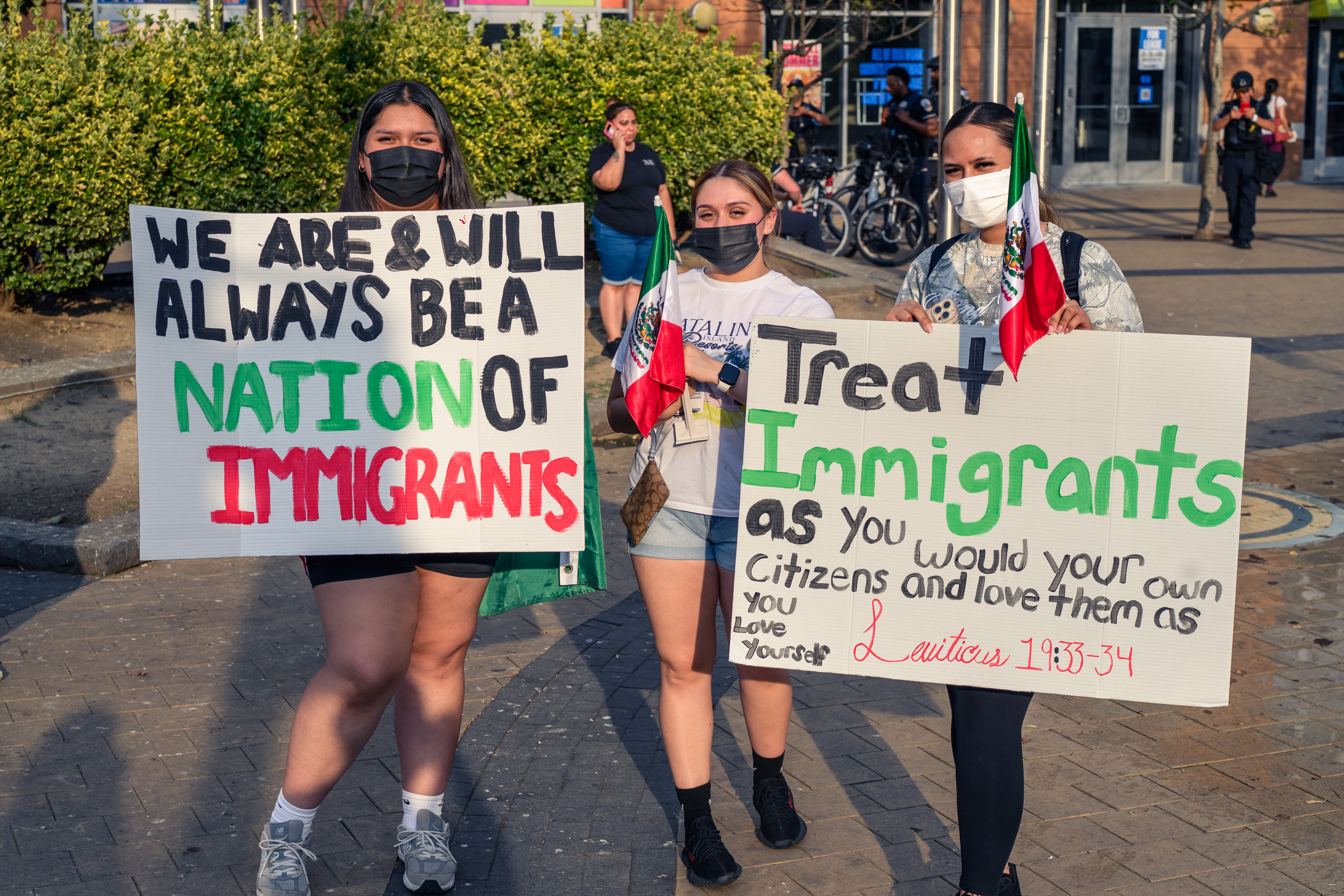
Protestors with signs at the ICE OUT Protest in Washington, D.C. on June 10, 2025

Demonstrations emerged nationwide in 2025 against ICE's immigration enforcement activity and policies. In June 2025, ICE raids in Los Angeles sparked protests that Reuters described as the strongest domestic backlash to Trump since he took office in January.

As early as April 2025, public sentiment shifted against deportations, with a majority of Americans finding the amount went "too far", and Gallup polling showing positive views of immigration as increasing "significantly". In an August 2025 poll by Pew Research Center ICE was rated the third least favorably viewed agency in the United States out of 16 that were surveyed ahead of only the Department of Justice and the IRS, with 49% approving and 40% disapproving. Views of ICE were also the most polarized among all agencies polled, with Republicans viewing it as their third-most favorably viewed agency polled behind only the National Weather Service and National Park Service, with 72% approving and 21% disapproving. While it was the least favorably viewed agency by Democrats, with 78% disapproval and 13% approval. In October 2025, apps used by the public to document and archive videos of ICE activities were removed by Apple and Google from their respective app stores. Also in October, Meta removed a Facebook group page dedicated to tracking ICE agents, at the Justice Department's request.

In January 2026, following the killing of Renée Good, tens of thousands protested across various cities in America. On January 30, protestors organized a "National Shutdown" to protest ICE actions, with protestors across the country leaving work and school to protest "ICE's reign of terror".

===== Milan 2026 Winter Olympics protests =====
As the Milan–Cortina 2026 Winter Olympics began, large protests erupted in Milan and other cities across Italy in response to the planned presence of agents from U.S. Immigration and Customs Enforcement (ICE). These agents were reportedly assigned to the security team for U.S. Vice President JD Vance. The protests, led by student groups, escalated into confrontations near the Milan Olympic Village, where police used tear gas and water cannons against the demonstrators.

===== Publicity campaign =====
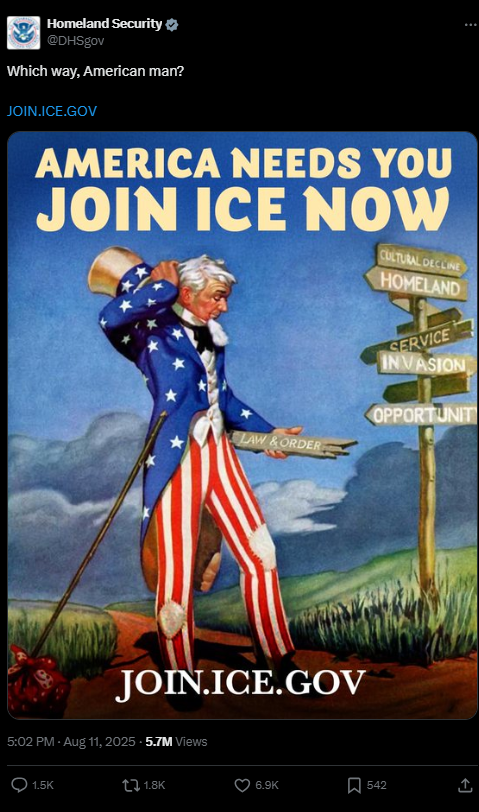
An ICE recruitment poster posted by Homeland Security on X on August 11, 2025, featured the caption "Which way, American man?", a reference to the 1978 book Which Way Western Man? which depicts Jews, Black people, and nonwhite immigrants as an existential threat to the United States.

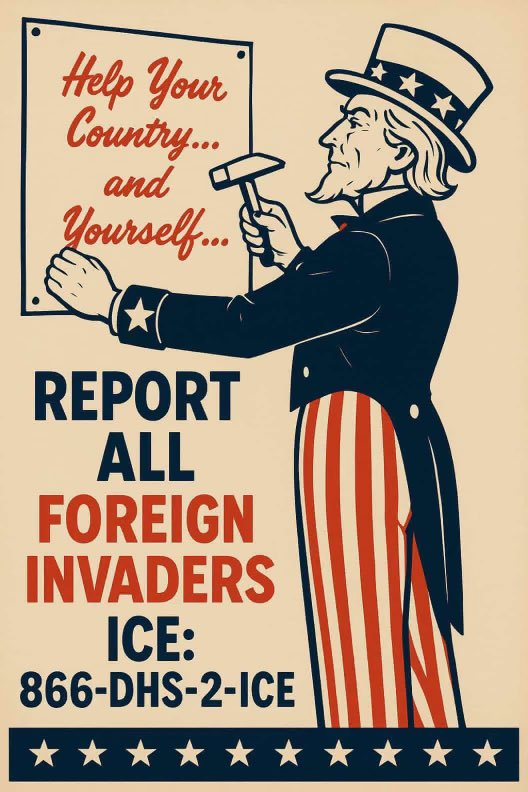
An anti-immigrant World War II–style propaganda poster posted by Homeland Security on X on June 11, 2025, telling readers to report "foreign invaders" to ICE during the Los Angeles protests. The poster was previously circulated by far-right accounts.

The agency's aggressive and meme-heavy publicity campaign was run by political appointees in their 20s, and received criticism from political commentators and scholars for being unprofessional and intentionally cruel. The Atlantic interviewed current and former ICE officials who criticized a flashy video posted by ICE with rap music, Trump's name, and vehicles with wrappings the color of Trump's private plane costing roughly $100,000 each (with plans to wrap 2,000 more) as "the transformation of ICE from an agency focused on legalistic immigration procedures into a political instrument and propaganda tool". The campaign noticeably re-used WWII-era US propaganda posters, several of which had text that suggested the goal of deportations was to protect American culture, and several of which were accused of promoting white nationalism by scholars and historians or were previously promoted by far-right accounts. The Southern Poverty Law Center found the DHS using "white nationalist and anti-immigrant images and slogans in recruitment materials" for ICE and that some "images and language appear to come directly from antisemitic and neo-Nazi publications and a white Christian nationalist website".

===== Excessive force =====
An ICE agent pepper sprays an already detained person's face on January 21, 2026, during Operation Metro Surge.

Several allegations and documented incidents of the agents using excessive force in response to protesters and migrants whether unprovoked or disproportionate to the situation have been documented. Violent encounters between ICE, migrants, and protestors have occurred following ICE's adoption of more aggressive tactics and sweeps of neighborhoods.

Following January 2026 killings of American citizens, The Economist wrote that the agency embodies a "macho culture" and has "revelled in the wanton use of force". It described ICE's closing of its internal Office for Civil Rights and Civil Liberties, rush to brand victims and protestors as "terrorists", repeated defiance of court orders, and attempts to ensure all investigations remain under its control as examples of impunity that would lead to more violence. By January 2026, The Washington Post reported that 16 DHS shootings since July 2025 were prematurely declared justified by federal officials before investigations were completed, and no federal officers were held accountable. A July 2026 report from the American Civil Liberties Union found ICE using or threatening violent force in nearly one-third of more than 1,200 immigration enforcement operations it analyzed in 2025.

The New York Times interviewed several local police chiefs across the country who complained that aggressive ICE tactics were endangering residents, violating civil rights, and reversing efforts since the George Floyd protests to restore public trust in the police.

On 15 November 2026, Lizbeth Vargas Andrade, a 23-year-old pregnant U.S. citizen, was pepper-sprayed and arrested by ICE agents outside the Stanislaus County jail in Modesto, California. Video footage showed agents taking her to the ground and handcuffing her while she was lying face down. Her husband could be heard telling the agents that she was pregnant. Andrade said that agents had accused her of assaulting an officer, an allegation she denied. The United States Department of Homeland Security said that she had interfered with and attempted to obstruct a federal arrest, and that the officer had acted in accordance with his training. Andrade was released later that day without being charged with a crime.

===== Authoritarianism and Gestapo analogy =====
Following the killing of Renée Good, JD Vance says "That guy is protected by absolute immunity."

Various criticism have been made asserting a relationship between ICE and authoritarianism in the US. The New York Times described the comparisons as a result of the "specter of masked men killing American citizens during protests has raised fears of authoritarianism and talk of resistance, with many residents saying America's 250-year experiment in democracy is imperiled". Critics of ICE have frequently described the agency as fascist or compared it to fascist institutions. Rahm Emanuel described ICE as "a lawless mob". Journalist and historian Garrett M. Graff criticized ICE and CBP's domestic policing, comparing its current status as "a fascist secret police" stemming from post-9/11 security policy.

ICE has been criticized and compared to the Gestapo, referring to the Geheime Staatspolizei, the official secret police of Nazi Germany and Nazi-occupied Europe that persecuted targets of the Nazi regime, including Jews, political opponents, and other dissenters. Some have criticized comparisons to the Holocaust and Nazis as risking "oversimplifying and trivializing history".

===== Terror =====
Media sources, politicians, and others have described ICE activities, particularly during Operation Metro Surge, as state terror. Democratic politicians and legal experts have criticized some ICE actions as an example of "political intimidation".

In court filings related to federal charges leveled against Minnesota activists opposed to ICE during Operation Metro Surge it was revealed that ICE's Homeland Security Investigations unit had used administrative warrants, undercover agents and technical means to surveil labor unions, activist groups, the Democratic Socialists of America and others engaged in conduct largely protected by the First Amendment.

===== Presence at polling locations =====
ICE has historically not been stationed at or conducted enforcement actions at polling places, with its acting director saying in February 2026 that "There's no reason for us to deploy to a polling facility". However, concerns about ICE appearing at polls have surged amid political rhetoric by those in Trump's orbit suggesting federal agents would be deployed around polling stations in the 2026 midterm elections. The White House later said there were no formal plans to do so, without ruling it out as a possibility.

The rhetoric surrounding the potential deployment of ICE agents to polling places has raised concerns among voting rights advocates and civil rights groups, who say their presence would intimidate voters. In response, multiple states have pursued legislation to explicitly block ICE or other federal immigration agents from their polling places.

== Organization ==
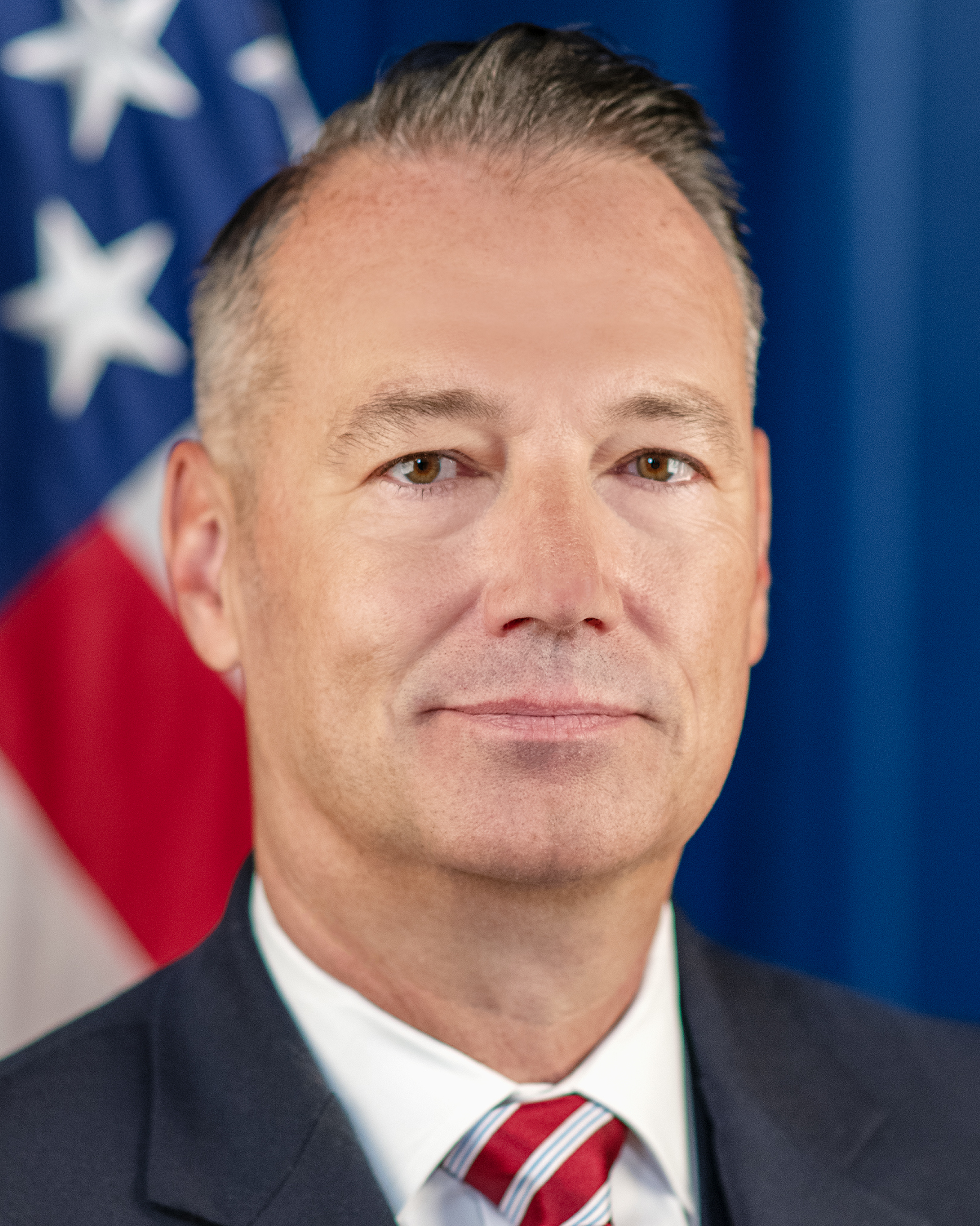
Todd Lyons was the acting director of ICE March 9, 2025–May 31, 2026, replaced by David Venturella. ICE has not had a Senate-confirmed director since Sarah Saldaña stepped down on January 20, 2017.

ICE maintains domestic offices throughout the United States and detachments at major U.S. diplomatic missions overseas. ICE personnel (special agents and officers) do not patrol American borders; rather, that role is performed by the Border Patrol. ERO and HSI operate as two independent law enforcement agencies and have completely separate mission statements. HSI is focused on the disruption of transnational crime, whereas ERO is responsible for the apprehension, detention and removal of illegal immigrants. ICE is responsible for identifying and eliminating border, economic, transportation, and infrastructure security vulnerabilities. ICE started the second Trump administration with over 20,000 employees. DHS is recruiting 10,000 new ICE agents. An additional 5,000 personnel from federal law enforcement agencies and 21,000 National Guard troops help arrest illegal immigrants.

The organization is composed of two law enforcement directorates (HSI and ERO) and several support divisions each headed by a director who reports to an executive associate director. The divisions of ICE provide investigation, interdiction and security services to the public and other law enforcement partners in the federal and local sectors. Tensions have existed between ICE's two branches, with HSI agents during Trump's first term seeking to more formally break away from ERO after finding it hampered their ability to conduct investigations due to negative associations with ERO's deportation work. The director of ICE is appointed at the sub-cabinet level by the president of the United States, confirmed by the U.S. Senate, and reports directly to the secretary of homeland security.

=== Structure ===
- Director (until July 2010 the title had been "assistant secretary")
  - Deputy director
  - Chief of staff
    - Enforcement and Removal Operations
      - Removal Division
      - Secure Communities and Enforcement Division
      - Immigration Health Services Division
      - Mission Support Division
      - Detention Management Division
      - Local Field Offices
    - Homeland Security Investigations
      - Domestic Operations Division
      - Intelligence Division
      - International Operations Division
      - Mission Support
      - National Intellectual Property Rights Coordination Center
      - National Security Investigations Division
    - Management and Administration
    - Office of Professional Responsibility
    - Office of the Principal Legal Advisor

=== Homeland Security Investigations (HSI) ===
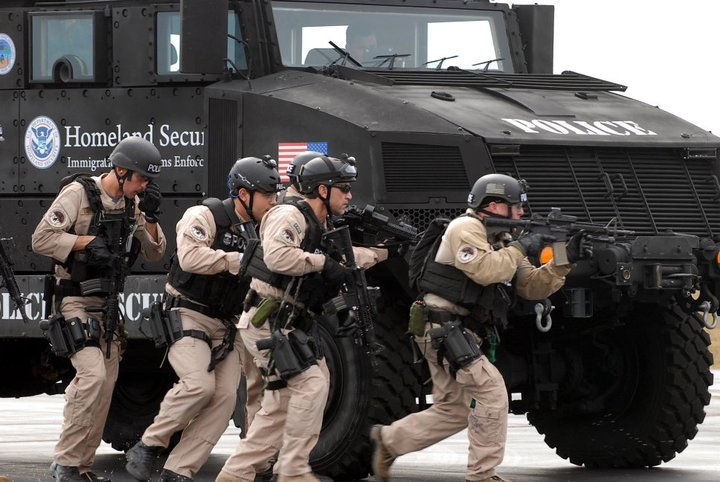
HSI Special Response Team (SRT) member training using armored vehicle at Fort Benning in Georgia. Image from ICE.

HSI is the primary investigative arm of Department of Homeland Security and consists of more than 10,300 employees who are assigned throughout 30 offices in the U.S. and 52 international offices (41 international sub-offices) around the world. Approximately 6,000 HSI employees are special agents (criminal investigators), making it the second-largest investigative service in the United States, behind the Federal Bureau of Investigation (FBI).

HSI special agents investigate violations of more than 400 U.S. laws that threaten national security, including counter-proliferation; human smuggling and trafficking; weapons smuggling; narcotics smuggling and trafficking; human rights violations; transnational gang activity; financial crimes, including money laundering and bulk cash smuggling; cyber crime; child exploitation and sex tourism; trade crimes such as commercial fraud and intellectual property theft; smuggling of counterfeit pharmaceuticals and other merchandise; document and benefit fraud; the manufacturing, sale, and use of counterfeit immigration and identity documents; mass-marketing fraud; art theft; international cultural property and antiquities crimes; export enforcement and visa security. HSI agents can be requested to provide security for VIPs, and also augment the U.S. Secret Service during overtaxed times such as special security events and elections.

HSI was formerly known as the ICE Office of Investigations. HSI special agents are Series 1811 criminal investigators and have the statutory authority to enforce the Immigration and Nationality Act (Title 8), U.S. customs laws (Title 19), general federal crimes (Title 18), the Controlled Substances Act (Title 21), with approval from the Department of Justice, as well as Titles 5, 6, 12, 22, 26, 28, 31, 46, 49, and 50 of the U.S. Code.

Peter Hatch—assistant director of Homeland Security Investigations—announced that ICE had assembled a "tiger team" to pursue international students who had participated in protests in solidarity with Palestinians during the Gaza war. This team used information from pro-Israel doxing website Canary Mission and radical Zionist organization Betar, investigating 5,000 listed names. Hatch stated that "more than 75%" of student protesters that ICE targeted for deportation came from these sites.

==== HSI Domestic Operations ====
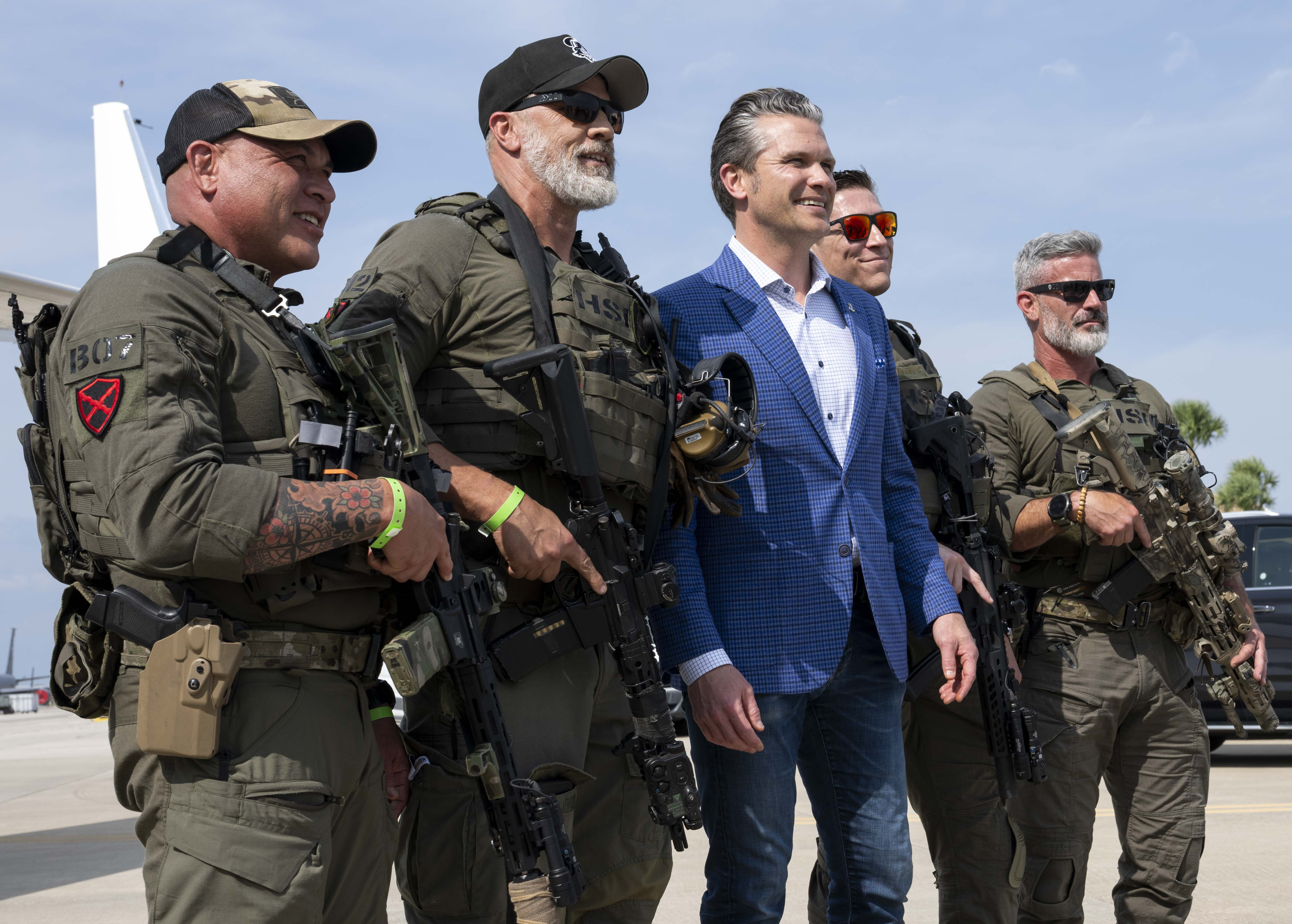
Homeland Security investigations agents with Secretary of Defense Pete Hegseth at MacDill Air Force Base, Florida on May 6, 2025. Image from U.S. Secretary of Defense.

The largest cadre of special agents are located within Domestic Operations. In FY 2020, HSI special agents made 31,915 criminal arrests, rescued or identified 1,012 child exploitation victims, and seized $341 million worth of counterfeit goods, 6,195 pounds (2,810 kg) of fentanyl and $1.8 billion in currency & assets from criminal organizations. HSI combats child exploitation, including the sexual exploitation of children; the production, advertisement and distribution of child pornography; and child sex tourism. They also work to identify and arrest those possessing and distributing child sexual abuse material. In 2006, Operation Flicker found that there were a number of government employees, including "dozens of Pentagon staff and contractors with high-level security clearance", who had downloaded child pornography.

==== HSI Office of Intelligence ====
The Office of Intelligence employs a variety of special agents and intelligence research specialists to facilitate HSI's tactical and strategic intelligence demands. They collect, analyze, and disseminate information for use by the operational elements of DHS. The Office of Intelligence works closely with the intelligence components of other federal, state, and local agencies. Many HSI field offices assign intelligence analysts to specific groups, such as financial crimes, counter-proliferation, narcotics, or document fraud; or they can be assigned to a residential intelligence unit, known as a Field Intelligence Group (FIG). HSI agents assigned to FIGs generally focus on human intelligence (HUMINT) collection.

==== HSI International Operations ====
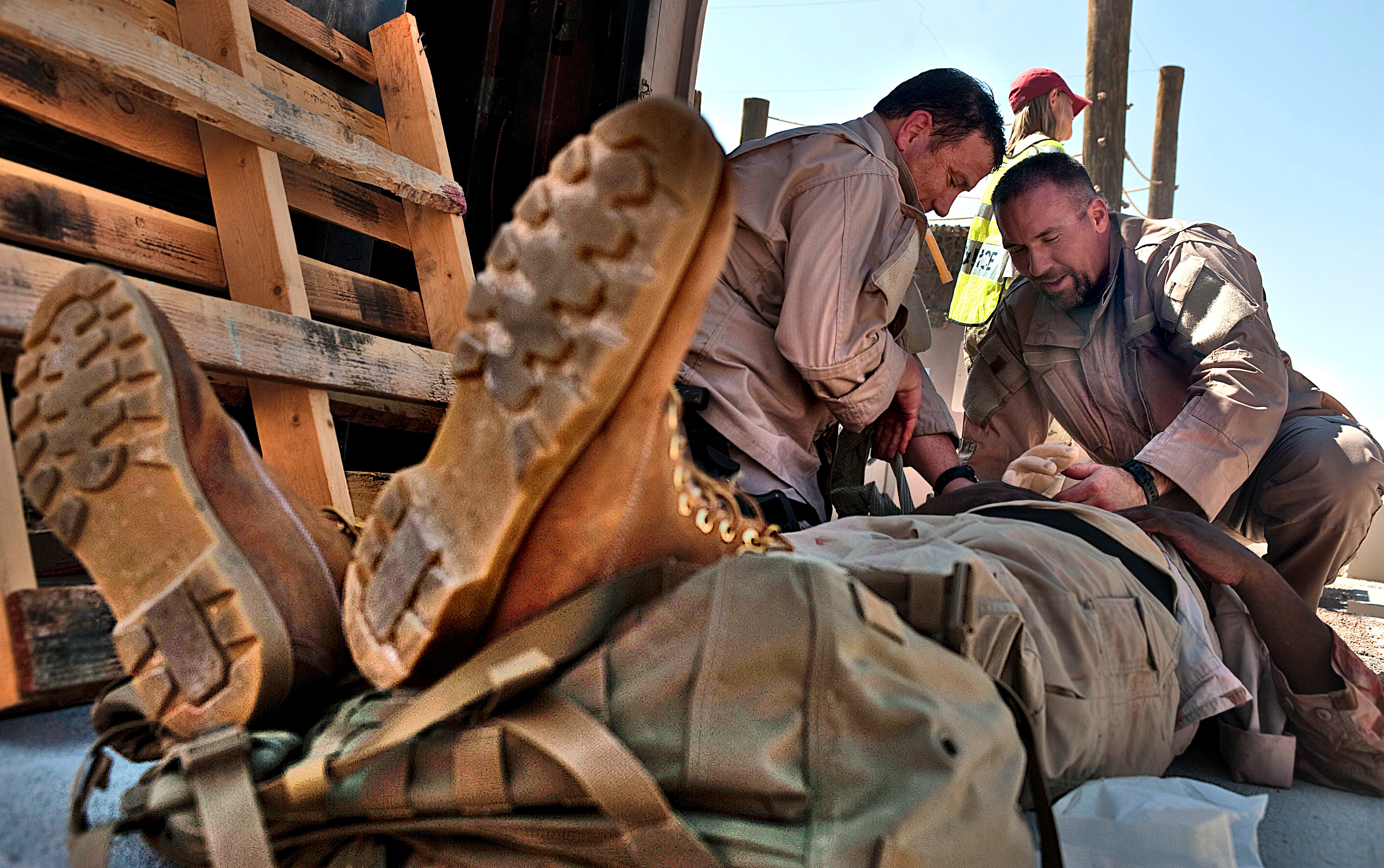
HSI Rapid Response Team members provide medical care to a simulated casualty during the RRT Field Familiarization and Disaster Response Training exercise September 20, 2012, at Nellis Air Force Base, Nevada.

International Operations (IO), formerly known as the Office of International Affairs, is a subcomponent of HSI with agents stationed in 60 locations around the world. HSI's foreign offices, known as attaché offices, work with foreign governments to identify and combat transnational criminal organizations before they threaten the United States. IO also facilitates domestic HSI investigations by providing intelligence from host countries, conducting collateral investigations, and facilitating international investigations conducted by field offices within the U.S.

==== HSI Special Response Teams ====
Twenty HSI field offices maintain a Special Response Team (SRT) that operates as a federal SWAT element for each office's area of responsibility. SRT was founded under the U.S. Customs Service as the Warrant Entry and Tactical Team and were renamed to SRT in 1998. In 2003, the SRTs were established when ICE was established. As of January 2020, ICE had 20 SRTs with 34 full-time duty officers and 269 collateral duty officers.

The SRT handles HSI's high-risk arrest and search warrants, barricaded subjects, rural area operations, VIP protection, sniper coverage for high-risk operations, and security for designated National Security Events. Active SRTs are located in Tampa, Miami, Phoenix, New Orleans, Houston, New York, Boston, Dallas, Los Angeles, San Antonio, San Juan, Detroit, San Francisco, El Paso, Chicago, San Diego, Seattle, Buffalo, and Washington, D.C. There is also a team of instructors and coordinators stationed full-time in Columbus, Georgia. These teams primarily deploy to handle high-risk operations, but have also assisted in such events as Hurricane Katrina, the Haiti earthquake 2010, and other natural disasters around the globe.

SRT is a collateral duty open to HSI special agents assigned to an office with a certified team. To qualify, candidates must pass a physical fitness test, qualify with multiple firearms by shooting 90 per cent or better in full tactical gear, and pass an oral interview process. Candidates who pass these stages and are voted on the local team are then designated "Green Team" members and allowed to train with the certified team members. Green Team members are eventually sent to the SRT Initial Certification Course at the Office of Firearms and Tactical Programs, Tactical Operations Unit at Fort Benning, Georgia, where they must pass additional physical fitness, firearms, scenario-based and written assessments.

SRTs often conduct training exercises with various federal, state and local teams, and assist other teams during national events or large-scale operations involving multiple high-risk scenarios. The working relationship between the SRTs and the U.S. Department of Defense has led to U.S. Special Operations Command providing the SRTs with excess mine-resistant ambush protected vehicles (MRAPs), firearms, and other gear designed for use by U.S. special operations forces.

=== Enforcement and Removal Operations (ERO) ===
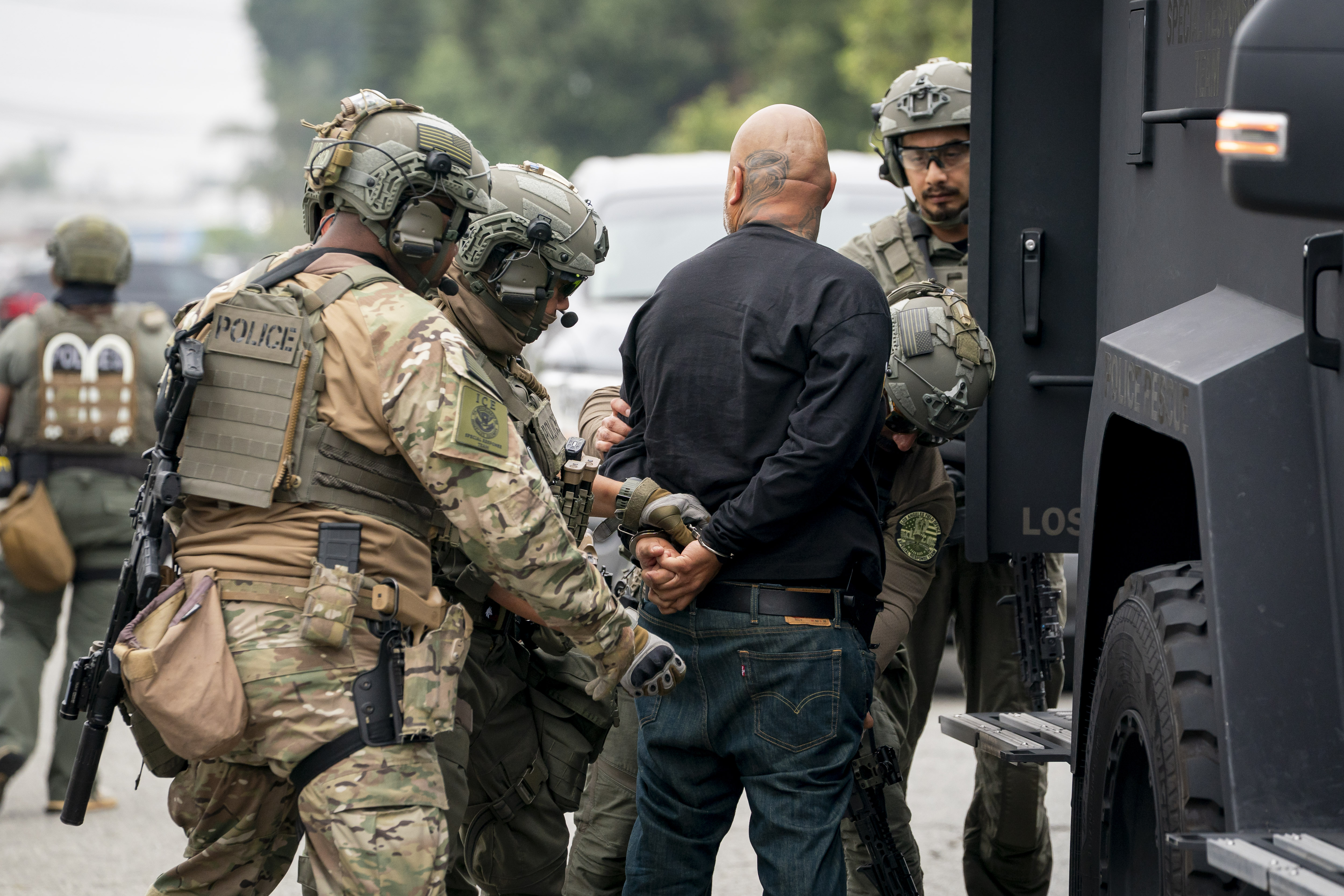
ICE "enforcement and removal operation" in Los Angeles. Image provided by the Department of Homeland Security.

Enforcement and Removal Operations (ERO) primarily deals with the deportation and removal of illegal immigrants. It is among the most public and contentious functions of ICE. ERO maintains custodial facilities used to detain people who are illegally present in the United States. In interior offices, ERO officers primarily conduct targeted enforcement operations to apprehend immigrants. At border offices, ERO officers receive and detain illegal immigrants apprehended by the United States Border Patrol.

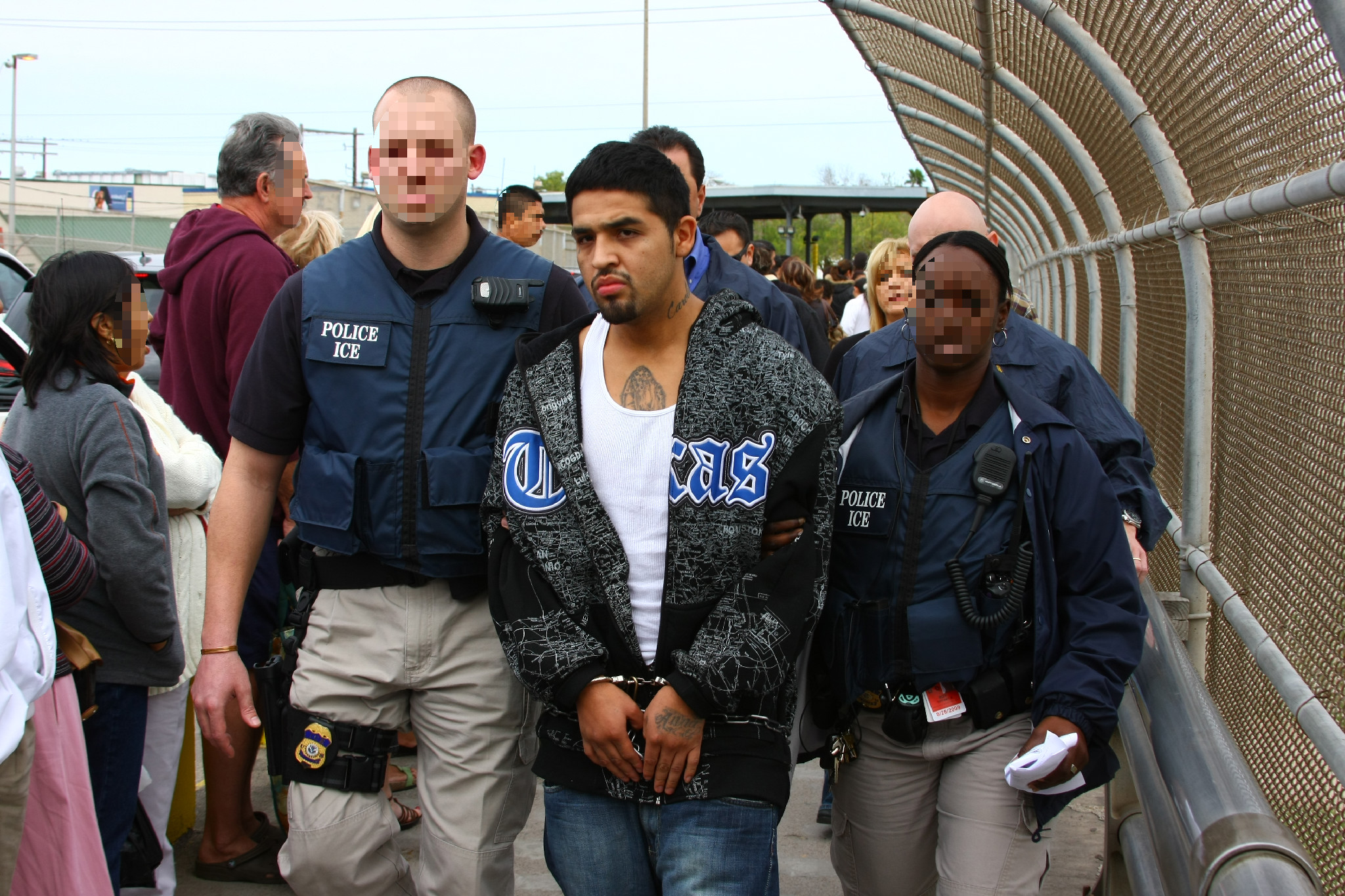
ICE ERO officers deporting a man to Mexico. Image provided by ICE.

ERO is responsible for enforcing the federal government's immigration laws and ensuring the departure of removable immigrants from the United States. ERO uses its detention and deportation officers to identify, arrest, and remove immigrants who violate U.S. immigration law. Deportation officers are responsible for the transportation and detention of immigrants in ICE custody to include the removal of immigrants to their country of origin. Deportation officers arrest immigrants for violations of U.S. immigration law, monitor cases during deportation proceedings, supervise released immigrants, and deportation from the United States.

Deportation officers operate strategically placed Fugitive Operations Teams whose function is to locate, apprehend, and remove immigrants who have absconded from immigration proceedings and remain in the United States with outstanding warrants for deportation. Due to limited staffing, ERO Fugitive Operations typically target illegal immigrants with a history of serious criminal convictions (i.e. homicide, sexual assaults, aggravated felonies).

ERO manages the Secure Communities program which identifies removable immigrants located in jails and prisons. Fingerprints submitted as part of the normal criminal arrest and booking process will automatically check both the Next Generation Identification (NGI) of the FBI's Criminal Justice Information Services (CJIS) Division and the Automated Biometric Identification System (IDENT) of the Department of Homeland Security's US-VISIT Program. ERO was formerly known as the Office of Detention and Removal Operations (DRO).

=== Other ICE divisions ===
The Office of State, Local and Tribal Coordination (OSLTC) is ICE's primary outreach and communications component for state, local and tribal stakeholders. It is responsible for building and improving relationships, and coordinating activities with state, local, territorial, and tribal law enforcement agencies and through public engagement. It also fosters and sustains relationships with federal, state and local government officials and coordinates ICE ACCESS programs (Agreements of Cooperation in Communities to Enhance Safety and Security). The Office of the Principal Legal Advisor (OPLA) provides legal advice, training and services to support the ICE mission and defends the interests of the United States in the administrative and federal courts. The Office of Professional Responsibility is responsible for investigating allegations of misconduct involving employees of ICE.

ICE Air is the aviation division of ICE that charters aircraft or books commercial flights to send deportees back to their home countries. There were 10 aircraft used to send deportees in 2017, which increased to 12 by 2026. Deportees have legs and arms secured while boarding, handcuffs are removed during flight and most deportees have no restraints upon disembarking. ICE Health Service Corps (IHSC) is a division that is responsible for providing direct patient care to approximately 13,500 detainees housed in 21 detention facilities throughout the nation. Their stated mission is to provide the best care to those in ICE custody, practicing on the core values of Integrity, Commitment, Accountability, Service, and Excellence. The IHSC team is made up of around 1,000 members that consist of US Public Health Service Commissioned Corps officers, healthcare professionals, and federal civil service workers.

=== Former units ===
The Federal Air Marshal Service (FAMS) was aligned into ICE shortly after the creation of the Department of Homeland Security. On October 16, 2005, Homeland Security Secretary Michael Chertoff officially approved the transfer of the Federal Air Marshal Service from the Bureau of Immigration & Customs Enforcement (ICE) to the TSA as part of a broader departmental reorganization to align functions consistent with the Department of Homeland Security (DHS) "Second Stage Review" findings for:

- consolidating and strengthening aviation law enforcement and security at the Federal level;
- creating a common approach to stakeholder outreach; and
- improving the coordination and efficiency of aviation security operations.

As part of this realignment, the director of the Federal Air Marshal Service also became the assistant administrator for the TSA Office of Law Enforcement (OLE), which houses nearly all TSA law enforcement services. The Federal Protective Service (FPS) was moved from the General Services Administration (GSA) to ICE upon the creation of the Department of Homeland Security (DHS). The FPS was later moved out of ICE to the National Protection Programs Directorate.

Originally a part of the U.S. Customs Service's Office of Investigations, the Office of Air and Marine (then called the Air and Marine Interdiction Division) were transferred to ICE in 2003 during the creation of the Department of Homeland Security, becoming the Office of Air and Marine Operations. Due in part to a 500 million dollar budgetary dispute between CBP and ICE, in 2004, ICE Air and Marine Operations were transferred to CBP. CBP Air and Marine still works closely with ICE to support the agency's domestic and international law enforcement operations. The Office of Detention Policy and Planning was responsible for developing and maintaining ICE's National Detention Standards, which set out detailed rules for how immigration detainees were to be treated differently than criminal inmates. In April 2017, President Donald Trump decided to close the office and to stop including the standards in new jail contracts.

== Training ==
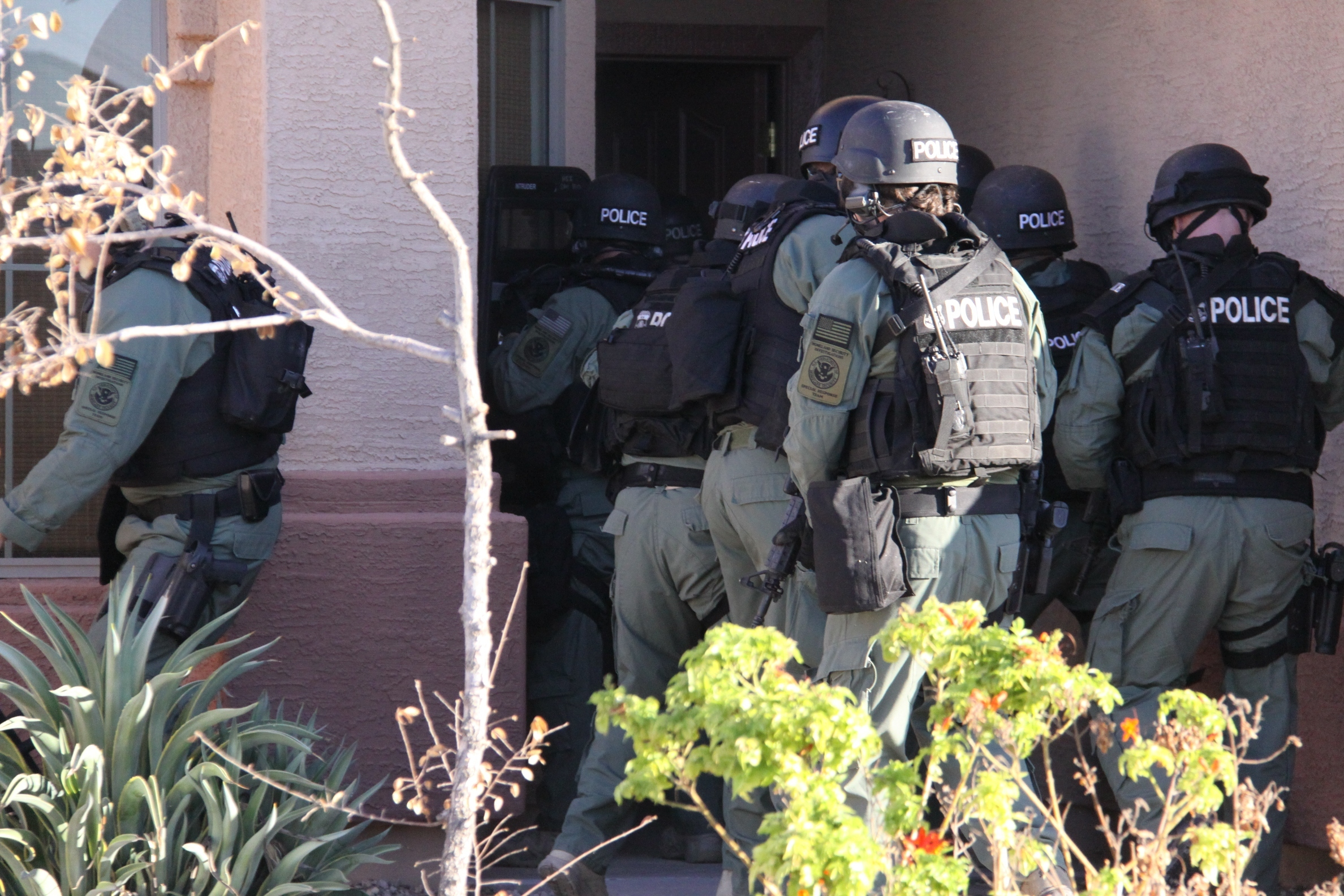
HSI Special Response Team (SRT) drug raid during Operation Pipeline Express in Arizona. Image provided by ICE.

Newly hired ICE law enforcement personnel receive their training at the Federal Law Enforcement Training Centers (FLETC) in Glynco, Georgia. As of 2025, only recruits with no law enforcement experience receive training at FLETC, with other recruits taking an online test instead. Prior to 2025, ERO Officer trainees had to complete the basic 13-week ERO academy, and basic training lasted 72 days. In August 2025, ERO training was cut in half to run six days a week for eight weeks and academy training reduced to 47 days, then reduced to 42 days in September. ICE says trainees receive roughly 28 days of "on the job" training.

In 2026, internal documents from ICE detailed it had cut 240 hours of its basic training program, roughly 40% of instructional time, including 100 hours of practical hands-on training, 56 hours of firearms training, almost all fitness training, and dozens of hours on officers' legal authority.

HSI Special Agent trainees must complete the inter-agency Criminal Investigator Training Program (CITP) and the HSI Special Agent Training Course (HSI SAT). HSI special agents also receive significantly advanced training regarding U.S. customs law, warrant service, advanced tactics, undercover operations, criminal interrogation, weapons of mass destruction, and other subjects routinely encountered by HSI special agents in the field. HSI Special Agents typically complete CITP in conjunction with other agencies (i.e. Secret Service, Diplomatic Security Service, Bureau of Alcohol, Tobacco & Firearms, and various Office of Inspector Generals, etc.); however, the agency specific HSI SAT course is only attended by HSI trainees and focuses on customs & immigration related investigations.

== Weapons and equipment ==
=== Surveillance and data collection technology ===
In 2025, it was reported that ICE agents use a facial recognition app called Mobile Fortify. According to documentation from the US Department of Homeland Security, the app draws from databases from the CBP Traveler Verification Service including photos taken at airports when people enter and exit the US, and can provide information including a subject's name, date of birth, possible citizenship status, and whether the subject's visa might have expired, and the DHS Seizure and Apprehension Workflow. In December 2025, Politico reported that ICE's large purchases of high-tech surveillance equipment expected to total at least $300 million coupled with lowered administration guardrails on data collection via executive order workarounds on federal data privacy standards showed that "the agency itself is signaling a shift in its enforcement policy, looking beyond immigrants and toward American critics of its officers' behavior".

In September 2025, ICE signed a contract of $10 million with Clearview AI, making it their largest contract to date, with the second-largest being $2.3 million in 2021 for facial recognition software that controversially scrapes images from social media for face printing. ICE has been criticized for its deal with Paragon Solutions, a spyware company whose tool, Graphite, enables remote access to mobile phones, including encrypted apps. The $2 million contract, initially signed under the Biden administration but paused under a 2023 executive order restricting spyware linked to misuse abroad, was reactivated in 2025 by the second Trump administration. Paragon faced scrutiny after its software was reportedly used to target journalists, migrant advocates, and associates of Pope Francis in Italy. Civil liberties advocates warned of threats to due process and human rights.

Concerns were raised over a $30 million no-bid contract awarded to Palantir Technologies to develop "ImmigrationOS", a data system designed to help ICE prioritize deportations by merging government and private data. While aimed at targeting visa overstayers and alleged gang members, civil rights advocates warned the system could easily be repurposed to surveil or target U.S. citizens, including political opponents of President Trump. Trump had reportedly suggested removing not just immigrants but also U.S. citizens deemed dangerous and said he ordered Attorney General Pam Bondi to investigate.

In September 2025, Trump labeled "Antifa" a "domestic terrorist organization", and issued an executive order to all federal agencies to investigate it. ICE acting director, Todd Lyons, said in an interview that ICE will investigate anti-ICE protester networks, "to track the money. We are going to track these ringleaders ... and ... professional agitators". The technology can be covertly inserted into anyone's phone from a drone hovering over a protest, and features iris-scanning software that can be used from a smartphone, correlating instantly to a current massive database of such data. Former officials, Democratic politicians, and civil rights advocates, have complained that ICE is now permitted and empowered to engage in sweeping surveillance of Americans engaging in constitutionally permissible political action.

==== Data access ====
Efforts have been made to combine personal data from multiple federal agencies to support immigration enforcement. This included records from the SSA, IRS, OPM, HHS, and others. It's been reported that the administration is using the data to detect visa overstays, identify undocumented individuals, and cross-reference benefits usage with immigration status. ICE has also accessed a database of health and car insurance claims as part of the deportation effort. Civil groups and several state attorneys general argue these practices violate the Privacy Act of 1974 by failing to publish legally required notices in the Federal Register. In June 2025, twenty states filed lawsuits alleging that DOGE's access to Medicaid and benefit data was used to facilitate immigration raids, disproportionately impacting mixed-status families.

=== Firearms ===
Model	Type	Caliber	Notes
Glock 17	Semi-automatic pistol	9x19mm Parabellum	Previously issued sidearm
Glock 19	Semi-automatic pistol	9x19mm Parabellum	Previously issued sidearm
H&K USPC	Semi-automatic pistol	.40 S&W	Previously issued sidearm
Beretta 96	Semi-automatic pistol	.40 S&W	Previously issued sidearm
SIG-Sauer P229 DAK	Semi-automatic pistol	.40 S&W	Previously issued sidearm
SIG-Sauer P320C	Semi-automatic pistol	9x19mm Parabellum	Standard sidearm since 2017
M4 carbine	Assault rifle	5.56×45mm NATO	
Remington 870 shotgun	Shotgun	12-gauge	

The agency has a list of personally owned weapons that are authorized for duty and off duty carry. These weapons must be inspected and approved by the agency's firearms unit. The agents and officers must qualify with the weapon every three months. As non-lethal options, special agents and officers are armed with the expandable metal baton and pepper spray.

=== Identity-concealing masks ===
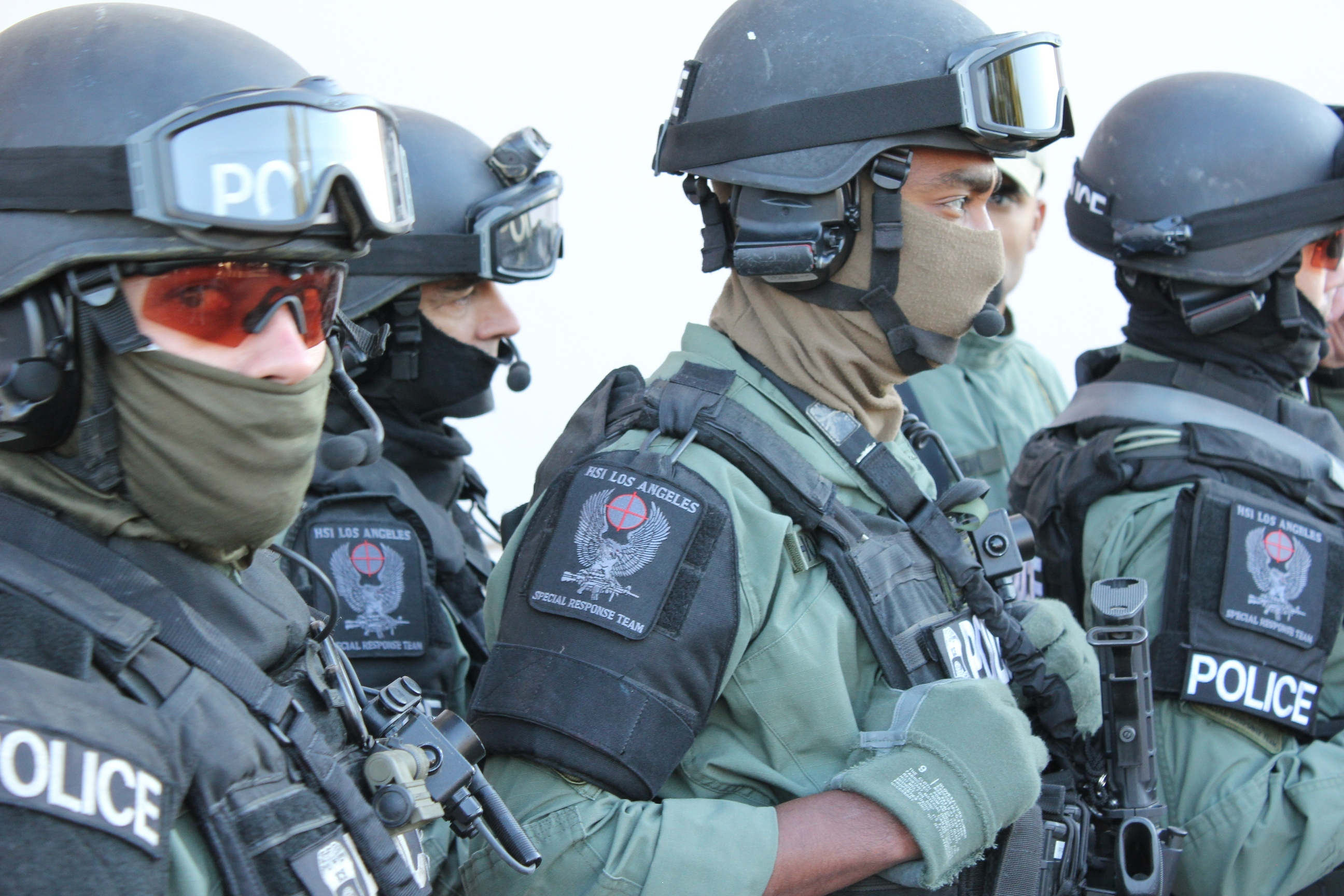
Uniformed HSI SRT agents in Los Angeles wearing identity-concealing balaclavas.

ICE agents have used balaclavas to conceal their identities. Tom Homan, Border Czar under Trump, defended ICE agents' use of such identity-concealing face masks, stating, "ICE officers wear a mask because they've been doxxed by the thousands", continuing, "Their families have been doxxed. ICE officers' pictures show up on trees and telephone poles. Death threats are sky-high." In response to ICE's masking practice, California passed the No Secret Police Act, an anti-mask law to prevent federal agents from wearing masks during their raids. In February 2026, a district court judge blocked California's law because it only applied to federal agents and not state officers. In March 2026, the states of Washington and New Jersey both passed anti-mask laws banning all law enforcement officers, including federal agents, from wearing masks.

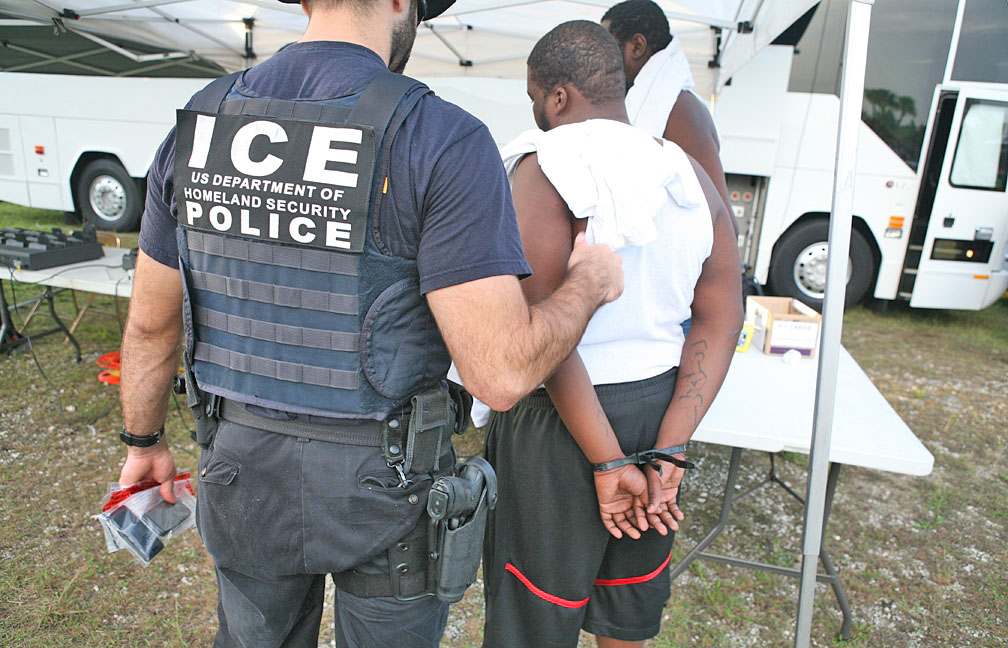
ICE officer detaining a suspect. Image provided by ICE.

== Immigration law ==
Immigration and Nationality Act Section 287(g) allows ICE to establish increased cooperation and communication with state, and local law enforcement agencies. Section 287(g) authorizes the secretary of homeland security to enter into agreements with state and local law enforcement agencies, permitting designated officers to perform immigration law enforcement functions, pursuant to a memorandum of agreement (MOA), provided that the local law enforcement officers receive appropriate training and function under the supervision of sworn ICE officers. Under 287(g), ICE provides state and local law enforcement with the training and subsequent authorization to identify, process, and when appropriate, detain illegal immigrants they encounter during their regular, daily law-enforcement activity under the Task Force Model.

The 287(g) program is one of several ICE ACCESS (ICE "Agreements of Cooperation in Communities to Enhance Safety and Security") programs that increase collaboration between local law enforcement and immigration enforcement agents. 287(g) agreements increased from 135 in January 2025 to 649 in June 2025.

== ERO detention centers ==
The rate of ICE detentions accelerated during the second Trump administration.

ICE ERO operates detention centers throughout the United States that detain people who are apprehended and placed into removal proceedings. The United States maintains the largest immigrant detention camp infrastructure in the world. As of February 2026, ICE reported it used 225 detention facilities in the current fiscal year, which began on October 1, 2025. On January 15, 2026, ICE reported holding around 73,000 individuals in custody, the highest level since its founding in 2003.

According to the Columbia Law Review, for decades, "courts and observers have documented and analyzed a wide range of detention-related concerns, including mandatory and presumed custody, coercion and other due process violations, inadequate access to counsel, prolonged and indefinite custody, inadequate conditions of confinement, and violations of international law obligations". It stated some commentators were increasingly preferring the term "incarceration" or "imprisonment". During Trump's first and second presidencies, a movement swelled online to call ICE detention facilities "concentration camps", while others situate it within American concentration camps, including the internment of German Americans, the internment of Italian Americans, and the internment of Japanese Americans at Manzanar and elsewhere.

=== Detention center conditions ===
'Results of an Unannounced Inspection of Winn Correctional Center in Winnfield, Louisiana' - published by Office of Inspector General June 2, 2026. Multiple violations including food spoilage were found at the facility.

Conditions in ICE detention centers have received substantial criticism and widespread allegations of rotten food, overcrowding, a lack of sanitation, physical and sexual abuse, and multiple deaths. The Intercept published a report by the DHS Office of Inspector General revealing that 1,224 sexual abuse complaints while in immigration custody were filed between January 2010 and June 2017. Contrary to ICE's claims, only 2% of these complaints were investigated. In 2020, the Kino Border Initiative received 442 reports of alleged abuse by US agents, meaning 18% of new arrivals were allegedly abused by a US official. In 2019, a detained U.S. citizen stated that he lost 26 pounds (12 kg) in 23 days due to lack of food.

In December 2025, the report "Torture and Enforced Disappearances in the Sunshine State: Human Rights Violations at 'Alligator Alcatraz' and Krome in Florida" published by Amnesty International concluded that the camp's conditions, including routine and prolonged use of shackles and retention in a "box" described as a 2x2 foot cage-like structure "constitutes torture". Human rights organizations and legal experts claim the camp does not meet the minimum standards of human treatment required for persons detained under international law due to the declared absence of sanitary facilities, medical care and access to legal advice with potential violations of the International Covenant on Civil and Political Rights (ICCPR) and the United Nations Convention Against Torture (UNCAT).

In 2025, conditions at Camp East Montana also received substantial criticism, and during its first 50 days, conditions at the camp violated at least 60 federal standards, according to ICE's own detention oversight unit. By December 2025, more than 45 detainees had reported abuse and injuries to their attorneys. Two inmates reported having their testicles crushed by guards as a form of punishment. As of January 2026, three detainee deaths were reported within 44 days. An autopsy ruled the death of 55-year old Cuban immigrant Geraldo Lunas Campos as a homicide caused by asphyxia. A 2026 report by Human Rights Watch and the American Civil Liberties Union described widespread human rights abuses at the camp including frequent beatings and their use for collective punishment, filthy conditions and inedible food, denied medical care and legal representation, and threats of violence.

=== Wrongful detentions ===
From 2012 to early 2018, ICE wrongfully arrested and detained 1,480 U.S. citizens, including many who spent months or years in immigration detention. A 2018 Los Angeles Times investigation found that ICE's reliance on incomplete and error-prone databases and lax investigations led to the erroneous detentions. From 2008 to 2018, ICE was sued for wrongful arrest by more than two dozen U.S. citizens, who had been detained for periods ranging from one day to over three years. Some of the wrongfully detained U.S. citizens had been arrested by ICE more than once. The inaccurate government data that ICE used had shown that both immigrants and U.S. citizens were both targets of being detained.

=== Separation of migrant children from families ===
As part of the 2018 first Trump administration's zero tolerance policy, nearly 3,000 minors were separated from their parents, or the adults accompanying them, while trying to illegally cross the U.S.–Mexico border and placed in detention camps. The former head of ICE, John Sandweg, was critical of child separation, telling NBC News, "You could easily end up in a situation where the gap between a parent's deportation and a child's deportation is years", and that many children might never see their parents again. Detained children have also been given up for adoption. In a series of court cases, foster families were successfully able to gain full custody of migrant children that they were housing without notifying their parents.

== Sanctuary cities ==
States which have banned sanctuary cities Sanctuary states States with no official policy

Sanctuary cities are cities that limit their cooperation with ICE ERO, particularly in regards to individuals arrested for state criminal violations. These jurisdictions generally do not honor ICE detainer requests to notify the agency and hold individuals beyond their normal release time. Sanctuary city policies address constitutional concerns about detaining individuals without probable cause, viewing immigration violations as civil rather than criminal matters.

Sanctuary cities were one of the many focal points for the Trump administration's attempts to reform the country's immigration policies. In early 2017, President Trump issued an executive order to deny sanctuary cities federal grants if they did not comply with ICE. By November 2017, this order was struck down by the United States District Court for the Northern District of California. Despite this, the Trump administration continued to seek ways to challenge sanctuary cities, such as implementing a policy that preferentially awards policing grants that cooperate with ICE.

== In popular culture ==
By January 2026, The Associated Press reported that a "broad cultural revolt" against ICE and Trump's immigration agenda was forming across American culture, business, sports, and entertainment. In October 2025, Zach Bryan, an American country music singer-songwriter, posted an audio snippet onto his Instagram account of a partial recording of an unreleased song called "Bad News" with lyrics which appeared to be critical of tactics used by some ICE agents deployed in cities around the country, although he said the full song would have "hits on both sides of the aisle". On January 28, Bruce Springsteen released the anti-ICE protest song "Streets of Minneapolis". Multiple celebrities at the 68th Annual Grammy Awards used the event to criticize ICE. In 2026, U2 released the song "American Obituary" criticizing ICE. In the 2026 song "Ran to Atlanta", Canadian rapper Drake referred to ICE as "fake feds".

Paul Thomas Anderson's 2025 film One Battle After Another, an adaptation of Thomas Pynchon's 1990 novel Vineland, begins with a raid on an ICE facility to free detainees and, according to The New Yorker, features "relentless government persecution of immigrants" and "the Army working closely with heavily militarized police".

In season 2 of the medical drama The Pitt, in the 2026 episode 5:00 P.M., ICE agents were depicted bringing a detained immigrant into a hospital and causing unrest among the staff.

== See also ==
- Abolish ICE
- Asylum shopping
- Dillingham Commission
- Diplomatic Security Service (DSS)—U.S. Department of State
- Drug Enforcement Administration
- Federal Air Marshal Service
- Federal Protective Service (U.S.)
- ICE List
- List of ICE field offices
- List of United States federal law enforcement agencies
- Monopoly on violence
- Never Again Action
- Operation Devil Horns
- Operation Endgame
- Operation Front Line
- Operation Protect Our Children
- Operation Tangled Web
- Title 19 of the Code of Federal Regulations
- U.S. Customs and Border Protection
- United States Citizenship and Immigration Services
- U.S. Marshals Service
- U.S. Secret Service
- Jaime Zapata
