= Operation Devil Horns =

Criminal investigation

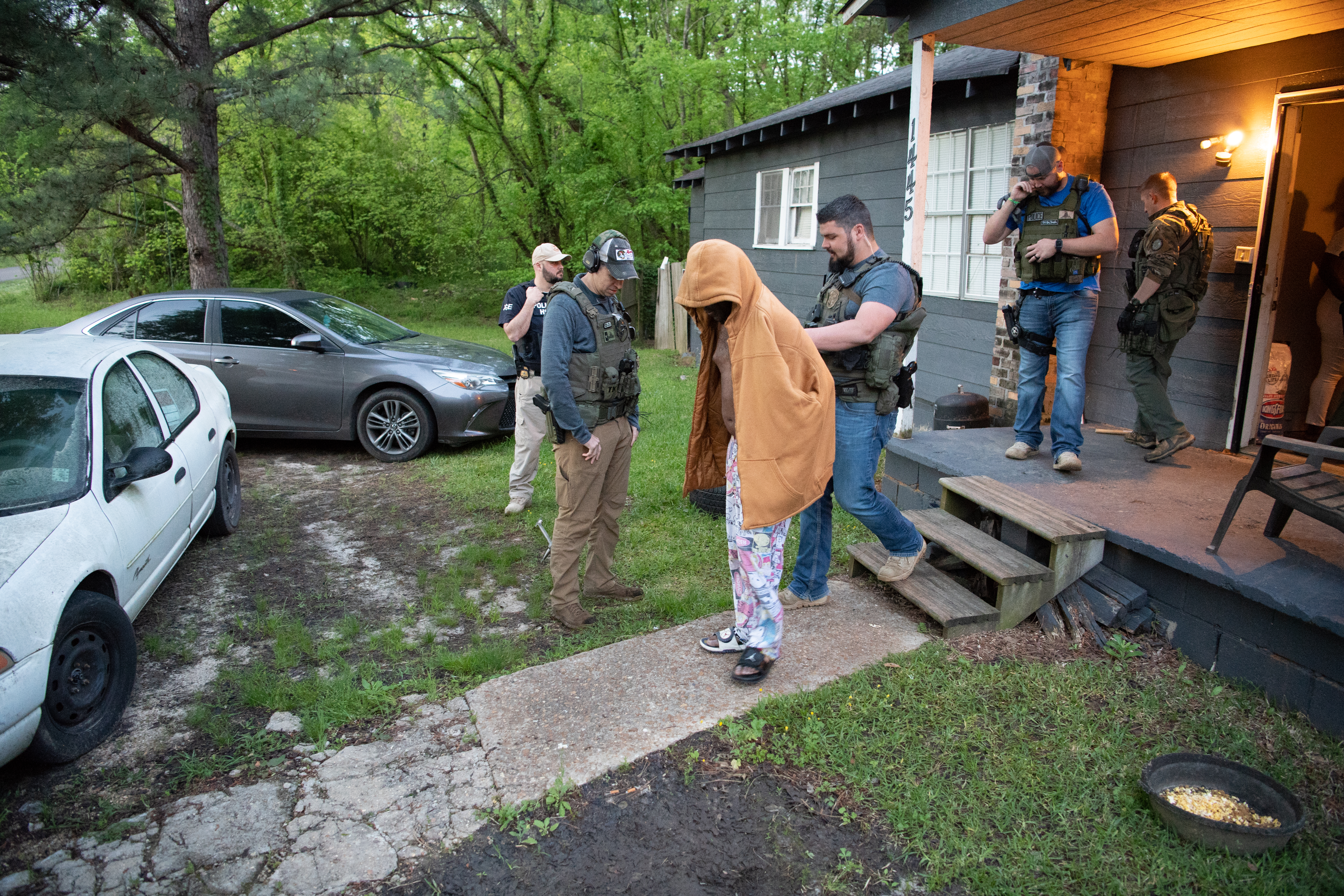
- Operation Devil Horns led to arrests and convictions of 37 MS-13 members in the San Francisco Bay Area.
- Operation name: Operation Devil Horns
- Operation codename: Devil Horns
- Type: Criminal investigation
- Scope: RICO investigation into MS-13

Participants
- Planned by: Homeland Security Investigations (HSI)
- Initiated by: U.S. Immigration and Customs Enforcement (ICE)
- Executed by: HSI, San Francisco Police Department, Federal Bureau of Investigation (FBI), multiple state and local agencies
- Countries participating: United States
- No. of countries participating: 1

Mission
- Target: MS-13 20th Street clique
- Objective: Dismantle MS-13’s 20th Street clique in San Francisco
- Method: Undercover infiltration, surveillance, coordinated arrests

Timeline
- Date begin: 2004
- Date end: 2008
- Duration: 4 years
- Date executed: 2008

Results
- Suspects: 37+
- Arrests: 28 (Oct 22, 2008)
- Indictments: 37+
- Convictions: 37+
- Miscellaneous results: Multiple life sentences; federal racketeering convictions

Operation Devil Horns was a four-year-long criminal investigation run by Homeland Security Investigations (HSI), culminating in the arrests and convictions of more than three dozen members of the MS-13 gang in San Francisco. It is one of the largest such cases of its kind in U.S. history.

== Criminal Investigation ==
Operation Devil Horns originated in 2004 with investigations by HSI into the presence and activities of an MS-13 clique known as “20th Street,” based in the Mission District of San Francisco, an area with a large population of Central American and Mexican immigrants. At the time, violent crime in the neighborhood was a major problem. Citywide, the Mission District had one of the highest murder rates and one of the lowest solution rates for homicide cases in the nation.

For several years leading up to the investigation, 20th Street gang members maintained a constant presence in Mission Playground, where they frequently terrorized and recruited youths who entered the park to play soccer, basketball, or other games. Despite pledges from senior leaders of the SFPD to put an end to the gang's violence and intimidation at the park, 20th Street continued to claim the playground as its "turf."

Targeting the gang, agents from HSI reached out to members of SFPD's gang task force for assistance in identifying key members of 20th Street, with the objective of applying federal RICO laws to dismantle their organization. When an MS-13 gang member from Honduras named Roberto Acosta, aka “Zorro,” was arrested by SFPD for a misdemeanor jaywalking violation, he was turned over to Immigration and Customs Enforcement (ICE). Under threat of deportation, Costa agreed to act as a criminal informant for HSI agents; he successfully infiltrated the 20th Street clique.

On June 22, 2008, a 20th Street clique member named Edwin Ramos participated in the slayings of three innocent victims who were members of the Bologna family in San Francisco, including Anthony Bologna and his two sons, Michael and Matthew. The fact that Ramos had been previously arrested twice by SFPD for violent crimes as a juvenile but was never deported to his home country of El Salvador led to national attention on San Francisco's sanctuary policy. This controversy led federal investigators in the Operation Devil Horns case to hasten the investigation's conclusion.

On October 22, 2008, approximately 300 state, local, and federal law enforcement officers, including numerous SWAT teams, simultaneously executed warrants at 35 locations in the San Francisco Bay Area, arresting 28 alleged gang members. No significant injuries occurred during the arrests

== Trials and Convictions ==
Two of the arrested 20th Street gang members pleaded guilty in November 2010 to murder in the aid of racketeering. In early 2011, the criminal informant Roberto Acosta surprised prosecutors by admitting he had committed at least eight homicides as an MS-13 member in Honduras, prior to signing on as an informant for HSI. He was dismissed as an informant for the prosecution and charged with felonies related to lying to federal investigators.

Two more gang members pleaded guilty to conspiracy to commit murder, soon followed by the clique's leader Ivan Cerna, aka Tigre, who pleaded guilty to murder conspiracy and illegal firearms charges, receiving twenty-five years in federal prison, but avoiding a possible death penalty. In August 2011, six more gang members arrested in Operation Devil Horns were convicted by a jury of racketeering conspiracy and murder in aid of racketeering.

In August 2012, Wilfredo Reyes, aka Flaco, was apprehended by HSI in North Carolina and charged as an accomplice to Edwin Ramos in the Bologna family murders. Reyes accepted a plea deal in July 2015, receiving a ten-year prison sentence. In total, the Operation Devil Horns investigation and prosecutions led to convictions of more than 37 gang members on racketeering charges, with the most violent leaders of the gang receiving life sentences.

US Attorney General Eric Holder bestowed a Distinguished Service Award to members of the Operation Devil Horns investigation and prosecution teams for their work in combating MS-13 in San Francisco. Recipients of the award included individuals from DOJ's Northern District of California office and Organized Crime and Gang Section, the FBI's Criminal Investigative Division, the Department of Homeland Security, and two police sergeants from the San Francisco Police Department.
