= Edge (surname) =

Edge is a surname of Anglo-Saxon or Norse origin. Notable people with the surname include:

== Government and politics ==
- Geoff Edge (born 1943), British politician
- Sir John Edge (1841–1926), Irish-born British justice in India
- John P. Edge (1822–1904), American politician from Pennsylvania
- Peter T. Edge, American government official
- Walter Evans Edge (1873–1956), American diplomat and politician
- Sir William Edge, 1st Baronet (1880–1948), British politician and businessman

== Music ==
- Andrew Edge (born 1956), English musician
- Damon Edge (1949–1995; born Thomas Wisse), American musician
- Dexter Edge (born 1953), American musicologist
- Graeme Edge (1941–2021), English musician, songwriter and poet
- Norman Edge (1934–2018), American jazz musician
- Peter Edge (fl. 1980s–2020s), English-American record executive

== Sports ==
=== Basketball ===
- Charles Edge (basketball) (born 1950), American basketball player
- Darnell Edge (born 1997), American basketball player in the Israeli Basketball Premier League
- Şafak Edge (born 1992), Turkish basketball player

=== Cricket ===
- Cyril Edge (1916–1985), English cricketer
- Geoffrey Edge (1911–1996), English cricketer

=== Football (soccer) ===
- Alf Edge (1864–1941), English footballer
- Bob Edge (1872–1918), English footballer
- Derek Edge (1942–1991), English footballer
- Jesse Edge (born 1995), New Zealand footballer
- Lewis Edge (born 1987), English footballer
- Roland Edge (born 1978), English footballer
- Shayne Edge (born 1971), American football player
- Thomas Edge (footballer) (born 1970), New Zealand footballer
- Tommy Edge (1898–1966), English footballer

=== Other sports ===
- Allan Edge (fl. 1970s), British slalom canoeist
- Bruce Edge (1924–1994), Australian rules footballer
- Butch Edge (born 1956), American baseball player
- Dave Edge (born 1954), British-Canadian Olympic long-distance runner
- Denny Edge (1903–1954), Canadian-born American player and coach of ice hockey
- Sandra Edge (born 1962), New Zealand netball coach and former player
- Selwyn Edge (1868–1940), British businessman, racing driver, and cyclist
- Steve Edge (rugby league) (born 1951), Australian rugby player

== Writers ==
- Arabella Edge (fl. 1990s–2010s), English writer
- John T. Edge (born 1962), American writer and commentator
- Simon Edge (born 1964), British novelist and journalist

== Other ==
- Charles Edge (architect) (1800–1867), British architect
- Charles Edge (computer scientist) (fl. 1990s–2020s), American computer scientist and author
- Dawn Edge (fl. 1990s–2020s), British medical researcher
- Nina Edge (born 1962), English ceramicist, feminist and writer
- Rosalie Edge (1877–1962), American environmental advocate
- Steve Edge (born 1972), British actor and comedian
- Steve Edge (lawyer) (born 1950), British corporate tax lawyer
- Stuart Edge (born 1989 as Stuart Edgington), American actor and entertainer
- Thomas Edge (died 1624), English merchant, whaler and sealer
- William Edge (mathematician) (1904–1997), British mathematician

== See also ==
- Morgan Edge, a DC Comics supervillain
- The Edge (born 1961 as David Howell Evans), guitarist for rock band U2
