= Timeline of the first Trump presidency (2017 Q1) =

The following is a timeline of the first presidency of Donald Trump during the first quarter of 2017, beginning from his inauguration as the 45th president of the United States on January 20, 2017, to March 31, 2017.

Trump's first presidential transition began on November 9, 2016, when the media called the 2016 presidential election. The period saw the creation of Trump's transition team, composed of political outsiders, businesspeople and high-ranking military figures, and saw the removal of Chris Christie, the governor of New Jersey, as transition chairman, as well as the appointment of Trump's son-in-law, Jared Kushner, as a senior adviser. Approximately 4,000 positions in the federal government were filed across the executive branch. Trump also announced the Trump Organization would transfer management to his older children, though that he would retain ownership.

During the first quarter of 2017, Executive Order 13769 was signed on January 27, which suspended refugee admissions and barred citizens of seven countries from entering the US, prompting legal challenges and partial stays leading to a nationwide block upheld February 9. Executive Order 13780, a revised order removing Iraq from the ban and which clarified lawful permanent residents were exempt from it, was issued on March 6; it was similarly enjoined between March 15–16, with the injunction extended on March 29. A fight to secure funding for the construction of the Mexico–United States border wall began with executive orders issued on January 25, which also expanded immigration enforcement, altered deportation priorities and sought to penalize sanctuary jurisdictions. On February 21, the Trump administration issued memoranda announcing 15,000 additional immigration enforcement roles and broader removal policies.

New appointments in government included, on January 20, Jim Mattis and John F. Kelly as the Secretaries of Defense and Homeland Security, respectively. From late January to March, cabinet confirmations including Rex Tillerson, Jeff Sessions, Betsy DeVos, Tom Price, Steven Mnuchin, Wilbur Ross, Ryan Zinke, Ben Carson, Rick Perry and Scott Pruitt were made. Following controversy over contacts with Russian ambassador Sergey Kislyak, Michael Flynn resigned as National Security Advisor on February 13, to be succeeded by H. R. McMaster, who was appointed on February 20. Sally Yates, acting Attorney General appointed under President Obama, was dismissed by Trump on January 30 after instructing the Department of Justice not to defend or enforce Executive Order 13769.

US real gross domestic product (GDP) grew at an annual rate of 0.7% this quarter, the slowest pace since early 2014. Growth was driven by increased business investment and services, but held back by declines in motor vehicles, inventories and government spending. As of March 31, 2017, the national debt was $19.8 trillion, down 0.65% from the previous quarter. According to FiveThirtyEight, Trump's approval rate at the end of March was 40.5%, down 5% from the start of his presidency. This placed him well below the approval levels typically seen this early in a president's first term, continuing a steady decline that began shortly after his inauguration. It reflected growing dissatisfaction over policies such as the attempted repeal of the Affordable Care Act; the sharpest declines were seem among independents and younger voters.

== Timeline ==
=== January 2017 ===
Date	Events	Photos/videos
Friday, January 20	Mike Pence takes the vice-presidential oath of office as the 48th vice president of the United States followed by Donald Trump taking the presidential oath of office as the 45th president of the United States.; President Trump proclaims a National Day of Patriotic Devotion.; According to contested reports in December 2017, while seated at Trump's inauguration speech, Michael Flynn, the forthcoming National Security Advisor, texts a former business partner that Russian sanctions blocking a private Russian-backed plan to build nuclear plants in the Middle East will now be "ripped up".; State officials in Florida, Delaware and New York confirm they have not received paperwork that Trump has relinquished control over his companies, despite earlier promises to do so.; Trump issues Executive Order 13765 to scale back parts of the Affordable Care Act.; The Trump administration suspends an Obama administration cut to Federal Housing Authority mortgage insurance premiums.; Trump signs a bill waiving a rule that requires military personnel to wait seven years after retiring before serving in a civilian post, to allow retired Marine general Jim Mattis to become US Secretary of Defense. The Senate confirms Mattis as the 26th US Secretary of Defense in a vote of 98–1 and retired Marine general John F. Kelly as the 5th US Secretary of Homeland Security in a vote of 88–11.; Protests damage parts of downtown Washington DC, leading to 217 arrests and 9 injuries.	Trump is inaugurated as the 45th US president Trump delivers his inaugural address
Saturday, January 21	An estimated 2.5 million people around the world attend the Women's March protesting the new administration, one of the largest single-day protests in US history.; Trump and Vice President Pence attend the inaugural prayer service at the National Cathedral.; Trump and Pence speak at CIA headquarters.; Sean Spicer, the White House press secretary, accuses the media of inaccurately representing the presidential inauguration attendance. Spicer does not take questions from the press and is criticized for making inaccurate statements.; Trump appoints Michael Flynn as National Security Advisor.; Two US drone strikes in Al Bayda Governorate of Yemen are the first reported drone actions under the Trump administration.; A secure video call to discuss sanctions against the FSB and GRU between Trump and Vladimir Putin, the president of Russia, suggested by Russian ambassador Sergey Kislyak to National Security Advisor Flynn during a December 29, 2016, phone call, possibly takes place.	Women's March demonstrators in Washington DC Trump delivers remarks at CIA headquarters
Sunday, January 22	Trump calls Benjamin Netanyahu, the prime minister of Israel, to discuss Iran, ISIS and the Israeli–Palestinian peace process.; Pence administers the oath of office for the White House senior staff.; White House counselor Kellyanne Conway coins the term "alternative facts" during an interview.; The White House announces they will not release Trump's tax returns.; Trump speaks to Nathan Deal, the governor of Georgia, about the tornado outbreak in the Southeast which killed 20 people and caused $1.3 billion in damage.; Foreign Adviser George Papadopoulos meets in Washington DC with Yossi Dagan, the head of Israel's Shomron Regional Council.	A mobile home damaged from the tornado outbreak in Berrien County, Georgia
Monday, January 23	Trump meets with twelve CEOs of major US companies.; Trump signs three memoranda. The first withdraws the US from the Trans-Pacific Partnership. Another reinstates the Mexico City Policy which bars international NGOs from receiving foreign aid that "offer or promote abortions as part of their family planning services". The third initiates a 90-day hiring freeze on the federal workforce.; Trump claims 3–5 million illegal votes cost him the popular vote in a private meeting with congressional leaders.; Trump speaks with Abdel Fattah el-Sisi, the president of Egypt, saying the US remains committed to their relationship and to continue military assistance to Egypt, discussing ways the US could support Egypt's economic reform program.; The Senate confirms Mike Pompeo as the Director of the CIA in a vote of 66–32.; A federal-court lawsuit is filed accusing Trump of violating the Constitution's Foreign Emoluments Clause.; Trump designates Ajit Varadaraj Pai as the chairman of the Federal Communications Commission.; The Trump administration removes former US Secretary of State John Kerry's apology for the Lavender Scare from the US Department of State's website.	
Tuesday, January 24	Trump signs Executive Order 13766 which expedites environmental reviews and approvals for future infrastructure projects.; Trump signs four memoranda. Two of them reverse the Obama administration's halt on the Keystone XL and Dakota Access oil pipelines, the latter of which had been the subject of protests by the Standing Rock tribe. Trump says these projects will recover 28,000 jobs. Another memorandum requires the pipelines use domestic steel (a directive shortly overturned by the White House in respect of Keystone), and the last calls for "expedited reviews of and approvals for" manufacturing facilities and "reductions in regulatory burdens" affecting domestic manufacturing.; Trump speaks with Narendra Modi, the prime minister of India.; National Security Advisor Flynn is interviewed by the FBI about prior conversations with Russian ambassador Kislyak. Flynn pleads guilty on December 1, 2017, to lying during the interview.; The Senate confirms Nikki Haley as the Ambassador to the United Nations in a vote of 96–4.	Trump signs orders to greenlight the Keystone XL and Dakota Access pipelines
Wednesday, January 25	Trump issues Executive Order 13767 directing the Department of Homeland Security (DHS) to begin construction of a wall on the US–Mexico border. Enrique Peña Nieto, the president of Mexico, rejects the idea that Mexico would pay for any border wall between his country and the US.; Trump issues Executive Order 13768, cutting federal funding for sanctuary cities who refuse to comply with immigration enforcement measures. The order also increases border patrol and immigration officers and changes deportation standards.; Trump bans US Environmental Protection Agency employees from contact with journalists or engagement on social media.; Trump announces he intends to investigate alleged voter fraud in the 2016 presidential election.	Trump delivers remarks to employees of the DHS
Thursday, January 26	Trump visits Philadelphia to address Congressional Republican leaders, regarding his agenda. He speaks at the Loews Hotel, along with Theresa May, the prime minister of the United Kingdom.; Press Secretary Spicer announces the border wall might be funded by a 20% tax on imports from Mexico.; Mexican president Nieto cancels a proposed meeting with Trump due to controversy over Trump falsely suggesting Mexico would pay for the wall.; Trump proclaims the start of National School Choice Week.; Patrick F. Kennedy, Joyce Anne Barr, Michele Thoren Bond and Gentry O. Smith resign from the Department of State after Victoria Nuland and Gregory B. Starr decline to stay on in the Trump administration.; Acting Attorney General Sally Yates informs White House Counsel Don McGahn that National Security Advisor Flynn's public account of his interactions with Russian officials during the transition were untruthful, making him vulnerable to blackmail.	Trump aboard Air Force One during a trip to Philadelphia
Friday, January 27	Trump speaks with Mexican president Nieto on the phone to discuss US–Mexico relations in lieu of their canceled meeting.; Trump holds a bilateral meeting and joint press conference with British prime minister May at the White House, where they discuss sanctions on Russia, NATO and US torture policy. May is the first foreign leader to visit Trump since his inauguration.; During a visit to the Pentagon, Trump signs Executive Order 13769, suspending the Refugee Admissions Program for 120 days and denying entry to citizens of Iran, Iraq, Libya, Somalia, Sudan, Syria and Yemen for 90 days.; Trump signs a memorandum calling for budget negotiations about the expansion and strengthening of the US military.; Pence speaks at the March for Life in Washington DC.; Trump has a one-on-one dinner with FBI Director James Comey. Later news reports state Trump asked Comey to pledge loyalty to him, and that Comey demurred. The White House denies this version of events.; Foreign Adviser Papadopoulos is interviewed by the FBI concerning Russian meetings in 2016. He pleads guilty in October 2017 to making omissions and false statements during the interview.	A joint press conference between Trump and May
Saturday, January 28	Trump speaks on the phone with Russian president Putin; Angela Merkel, the chancellor of Germany; Shinzo Abe, the prime minister of Japan; Malcolm Turnbull, the prime minister of Australia; and François Hollande, the president of France.; Trump signs Executive Order 13770 which enacts a five-year ban on lobbying for presidential appointees after leaving the White House. He also enacts a lifetime ban for officials lobbying on behalf of a foreign government and directs his generals to put together a plan within 30 days for defeating ISIS.; Executive Order 13769 goes into effect. Iran says it will take reciprocal action against the US. District Judge Ann Donnelly in New York grants a stay of the executive order, allowing people with valid visas who landed in the US to temporarily remain in the country.; Trump signs a memorandum to create a plan within 30 days to defeat ISIS, and another to restructure the National and Homeland Security Councils by downgrading the Chiefs of Staff and appointing Assistant to the President and Chief Strategist Steve Bannon.	Trump speaks about Executive Order 13769
Sunday, January 29	Trump speaks with King Salman of Saudi Arabia and Hwang Kyo-ahn, the acting president of South Korea.; The Yakla raid, the first commando raid authorized by Trump, leads to the death of Chief petty officer William Owens, 14 members of the Al-Qaeda in the Arabian Peninsula as reported by the US government and 14–25 Yemeni or other nationality civilian casualties, including American Nawar "Nora" al-Awlaki.; Federal judges in the states of Massachusetts, Virginia and Washington sign orders halting implementation of parts of Executive Order 13769. Chief of Staff Reince Priebus states that people from the affected countries who have a green card will not be prevented from returning to the US.	
Monday, January 30	Trump signs Executive Order 13771 which seeks to reduce the number of federal regulations by requiring agencies to repeal two existing regulations for every new rule introduced.; Trump fires acting Attorney General Yates after she orders employees of the Department of Justice not to enforce the president's ban due to doubts over its legality. Dana Boente takes her place as acting Attorney General. That same night, Trump replaces Daniel H. Ragsdale with Thomas D. Homan as acting director of US Immigration and Customs Enforcement (ICE).; Trump announces he will continue to enforce Executive Order 13672, signed by former President Obama in 2014, which established legal protections for LGBT workers.; A petition, launched on Sunday to cancel Trump's state visit to the United Kingdom in October, tops 1 million signatures, passing the threshold for British Parliament debate. The petition eventually reaches 1.8 million signatures. A British government spokesman says the state visit will still go ahead as planned.; The Iraqi Parliament votes in favor of a reciprocal travel ban on American citizens if Trump's executive order barring citizens of Iraq and six other Muslim-majority countries is not reversed. The Iraqi travel ban is not implemented as tens of thousands of US soldiers and contractors are involved in the fight against ISIS.	
Tuesday, January 31	Trump nominates Neil Gorsuch as an Associate Justice of the Supreme Court to fill the vacancy left by Antonin Scalia, who died in February 2016.; Trump meets with pharmaceutical executives at the White House.; The Senate confirms Elaine Chao as the 18th US Secretary of Transportation in a vote of 93–6.	Trump nominates Gorsuch for the Supreme Court Justice

=== February 2017 ===
Date	Events	Photos/videos
Wednesday, February 1	Trump visits Dover Air Force Base for the arrival of the remains of Navy SEAL Chief Special Warfare Operator William Owens who had been killed in action in Yemen three days prior, the first known combat death under the Trump administration.; The Senate confirms Rex Tillerson as the 69th US Secretary of State in a vote of 56–43.; Trump discusses a refugee agreement in a truncated phone call with Australian prime minister Turnbull, describing it to Turnbull as a "disgusting deal".; Trump proclaims February as National African American History Month.; The Trump administration withdraws the Mercury Effluent Rule which governed the use and disposal of mercury at dental offices.; White House adviser Jared Kushner meets with China's ambassador to the US, Cui Tiankai.	Trump participates in the swearing-in of Tillerson as Secretary of State
Thursday, February 2	Trump speaks at the National Prayer Breakfast and holds a bilateral meeting with King Abdullah II of Jordan. He also promises to dismantle the Johnson Amendment prohibiting religious organizations from giving political donations while maintaining a tax-free status.; Trump proclaims February as American Heart Month.; Trump warns Israel that building new settlements in the West Bank "may not be helpful" for a peace deal.; The Department of the Treasury eases some sanctions on the Federal Security Service, allowing for limited transactions with the intelligence agency.; Secretary of State Tillerson meets with Sigmar Gabriel, the foreign minister of Germany.; Ambassador to the UN Haley declares to the UN Security Council that sanctions against Russia for its Crimean conflict will not be lifted until Russia returns control of the region to Ukraine.; Then-Uber CEO Travis Kalanick resigns from the president's business advisory council, citing a concern that his participation would be seen as an endorsement of Trump.	A Palestinian boy and an Israeli soldier in front of the West Bank barrier
Friday, February 3	Trump signs Executive Order 13772 which instates a review of the Dodd–Frank Act.; Trump signs a memorandum directing the Department of Labor to review a fiduciary rule signed during the Obama administration, before its implementation in April.; Trump institutes economic sanctions on 13 Iranian individuals and 12 companies from the nation after a recent ballistic missile test.; Senior Federal Judge James Robart of the District Court for the Western District of Washington temporarily blocks Trump's order to temporarily block immigration from seven Middle Eastern nations.; Secretary of State Tillerson meets with Ayman Safadi, the foreign minister of Jordan, as well as UN and Arab League envoy to Syria Staffan de Mistura.; The Trump-appointed Federal Communications Commission chairman revokes an agreement with internet service providers for cheaper internet for poor communities.; Vincent Viola withdraws his name from consideration as Secretary of the Army.; The Department of the Treasury launches sanctions against supporters of Iran's ballistic missile program.	Trump's weekly address
Saturday, February 4	Trump's official Facebook page makes a false claim about Kuwait instating a travel ban similar to Executive Order 13769 while the Department of Justice appeals a court decision to overturn the executive order. Trump criticizes Federal Judge Robart for making the decision, referring to him as a "so-called judge".; Trump speaks with Paolo Gentiloni, the prime minister of Italy, confirming his attendance to the 2017 G7 summit in Sicily, and with Petro Poroshenko, the president of Ukraine, about the ongoing Russo-Ukrainian war.	
Sunday, February 5	The Ninth Circuit Court of Appeals denies a request from the Trump administration to immediately reinstate the temporarily blocked travel ban.; Trump speaks with Jens Stoltenberg, the secretary general of NATO, and Bill English, the prime minister of New Zealand.	
Monday, February 6	Trump addresses troops at MacDill Air Force Base and at the US Central Command.; The Department of Justice asks the Ninth Circuit Court of Appeals to restore the temporarily blocked travel ban.	Trump at MacDill Air Force Base
Tuesday, February 7	The Senate confirms Betsy DeVos as the 11th US Secretary of Education by a vote of 51–50. Pence, in the capacity of President of the Senate, becomes the first vice president since 1945 to cast a tie-breaking vote to confirm a Cabinet member.; Trump falsely claims the murder rate in America is at a 47-year high.; The House Committee on House Administration, led by the Republican Party, votes to eliminate the Election Assistance Commission, the only federal agency tasked with preventing the hacking of voting machines.; Trump speaks on the phone with Mariano Rajoy, the prime minister of Spain, and Recep Tayyip Erdoğan, the president of Turkey, confirming his support of NATO and discussing joint action against ISIS.; Trump tells a sheriff they should destroy the career of a Texas state lawmaker who opposed civil forfeiture.	Pence casts a tie-breaking vote to confirm DeVos as Secretary of Education
Wednesday, February 8	The Senate confirms Jeff Sessions as the 84th US Attorney General in a vote of 52–47.; Trump formally announces his full cabinet, comprising 24 members. The position of chairman of the Council of Economic Advisers is removed and the Director of National Intelligence and the Director of the CIA are elevated to cabinet level.; Trump writes a brief letter to Xi Jinping, the president of China.; Trump publicly chastises Nordstrom for not carrying his daughter Ivanka Trump's brand.; Secretary of State Tillerson meets with Chrystia Freeland, the foreign minister of Canada.	Trump speaks at the MCCA Winter Conference
Thursday, February 9	Jeff Sessions is sworn in as the 84th US Attorney General.; Trump refers to Senator Elizabeth Warren as "Pocahontas" due to her claimed Native American ancestry.; Trump signs Executive Order 13775, changing the line of succession for the Department of Justice.; Trump signs three executive orders regarding law enforcement: 13773, 13774 and 13776.; The Ninth Circuit Court of Appeals denies the Trump administration's appeal to block the lower-court ruling that halted the travel ban.; Trump agrees to continue the One China policy after a discussion with Chinese president Xi.; Secretary of State Tillerson meets with Federica Mogherini, the European Union High Representative.	Trump participates in the swearing-in of Sessions as Attorney General
Friday, February 10	Trump holds a bilateral meeting and joint press conference with Japanese prime minister Abe at the White House. The two leaders travel to Mar-a-Lago in Palm Beach, Florida.; The Senate confirms Tom Price as the 23rd US Secretary of Health and Human Services in a vote of 52–47.; Secretary of State Tillerson meets with Japanese and Georgian foreign ministers Fumio Kishida and Mikheil Janelidze.; Aboard Air Force One, Trump tells reporters he is considering issuing a revised policy banning citizens of certain countries from traveling to the US.	A joint press conference between Trump and Abe
Saturday, February 11	Trump and Japanese prime minister Abe play golf together at the Trump National Golf Club in Jupiter, Florida. They reportedly discuss the "future of the world, future of the region, and future of Japan and the United States" as well as a North Korean Pukkuksong-2 missile which was test-launched during the meeting.; Trump claims without evidence that three million votes were cast illegally for Hillary Clinton in the 2016 presidential election.	A joint statement by Trump and Abe
Sunday, February 12	White House adviser Stephen Miller repeats the claim of illegal voting on a television interview.; Trump and Japanese prime minister Abe hold talks at Mar-a-Lago over North Korea while regular diners are present.	
Monday, February 13	Trump holds a bilateral meeting and joint press conference with Justin Trudeau, the prime minister of Canada, at the White House.; Michael Flynn resigns as National Security Advisor following alleged discussions with Russian ambassador Kislyak regarding US sanctions on Russia. Keith Kellogg becomes acting National Security Advisor.; The Senate confirms Steve Mnuchin as the 77th US Secretary of the Treasury in a vote of 53–47 and unanimously confirms David Shulkin as the 9th US Secretary of Veterans Affairs. Shulkin is the first non-veteran to serve in this position.; The Department of the Treasury sanctions Tareck El Aissami, the vice president of Venezuela.	A joint press conference between Trump and Trudeau
Tuesday, February 14	FBI Director Comey and other officials give Trump a briefing on counterterrorism in the Oval Office. According to a statement Comey later makes to the Senate Intelligence Committee, after the briefing Trump speaks to Comey one-on-one about the FBI's investigation of Michael Flynn, saying "I hope you can let this go".; The Senate confirms Linda McMahon as Administrator of the Small Business Administration.; Trump discusses the opioid epidemic with Chris Christie, the governor of New Jersey.; Secretary of State Tillerson meets with Israeli prime minister Netanyahu and Mohammed bin Abdulrahman bin Jassim Al Thani, the foreign minister of Qatar. Thomas Shannon, the US under secretary of state, meets with Russian and Norwegian ambassadors to the US Kislyak and Kåre R. Aas.; Trump signs H.J.Res.41 into law, which nullifies a federal law requiring resource-extraction issuers to disclose payments made for "commercial development of oil, natural gas, or minerals" with foreign and domestic governments. He is the first president in sixteen years to sign a Congressional Review Act disapproval resolution.	Trump and Secretary of Education DeVos at a parent-teacher conference
Wednesday, February 15	Trump holds a bilateral meeting and joint press conference with Israeli prime minister Netanyahu at the White House. He calls on Netanyahu to "hold back" the construction of settlements in the West Bank.; Trump's comments on the Israeli–Palestinian conflict prompt Secretary-General of the UN António Guterres to warn against any abandonment of the two-state solution.; Andrew Puzder withdraws his nomination for Secretary of Labor.; Chief of Staff Priebus asks Deputy Director of the FBI Andrew McCabe to publicly dispute reports that associates of Trump had been in regular communication with Russian agents, and is rebuffed.; Under Secretary of State Shannon meets with Indonesian ambassador to the US Budi Bowoleksono.; Secretary of the Treasury Mnuchin appoints Eli Miller as Treasury Chief of Staff.	A joint press conference between Trump and Netanyahu
Thursday, February 16	Alexander Acosta is nominated to be Secretary of Labor and Mick Mulvaney is sworn in as the Director of the Office of Management and Budget in a vote of 51–49.; Trump holds his first press conference, defending his administration, criticizing "dishonest" press coverage thereof, denying Russian connections and questioning Hillary Clinton's conduct toward Russia.; Robert Harward, a former Vice Admiral, declines Trump's offer to replace Michael Flynn as National Security Advisor.; Trump signs legislation nullifying the Stream Protection Rule, a midnight regulation by the Obama administration regarding coal mining.; The Trump administration instructs the US Department of Agriculture to replace the terms "climate change" with "weather extremes" and "reduce greenhouse gases" with "build soil organic matter, increase nutrient use efficiency". They note to staff that climate change should no longer be a priority.; Secretary of State Tillerson meets with foreign ministers of G20 countries in Bonn, Germany.; Secretary of Defense Mattis says the US is not currently prepared to collaborate with Russia on military matters, including future US anti-ISIS operations.; Foreign Adviser Papadopoulos is interviewed for a second time by the FBI. In the following days he deletes his Facebook account which he had run since 2005 (containing correspondence concerning Russia), opens a new Facebook account and changes his telephone number.; Day Without Immigrants protests are held throughout the US to demonstrate the importance of immigration.	Trump holds a press conference
Friday, February 17	Trump visits the Boeing assembly facility in North Charleston, South Carolina, for the unveiling of its new 787-10 Dreamliner aircraft. He emphasizes his administration's commitment to improving the business climate and helping create American jobs.; From Mar-a-Lago, Trump describes on Twitter a wide range of mainstream news organizations as "the enemy of the American people".; The Senate confirms Scott Pruitt as the 14th Administrator of the Environmental Protection Agency in a vote of 52–46.; Secretary of State Tillerson attends a meeting on the Syrian civil war and meets with foreign ministers from three more countries during his trip to Bonn, Germany.	Trump's weekly address
Saturday, February 18	Trump holds a campaign-style rally in Melbourne, Florida, attended by an estimated 9,000 supporters, where he defends his actions and criticizes the media.; Pence speaks at the Munich Security Conference in Germany, touching upon the issues of terrorism and defense spending.	Trump speaks to supporters at the Melbourne rally
Sunday, February 19	The Trump administration asks the Council of Economic Advisers to predict 3.5% annual GDP growth while the Federal Reserve had predicted 1.8%, just over half that.	
Monday, February 20	Lieutenant general H. R. McMaster is appointed the 26th National Security Advisor. Keith Kellogg, who had been the acting National Security Advisor, remains as the National Security Council's Chief of Staff.; Not My Presidents Day protests against Trump's presidency take place across the US.; The Bureau of Land Management is instructed to lift a moratorium on new coal-mine leases on federal land, which have 40% of existing mines.	Trump announces McMaster as National Security Advisor
Tuesday, February 21	Trump visits the National Museum of African American History and Culture (NMAAHC) and addresses the increase in vandalism and bomb threats at Jewish community centers around the country.; The Trump administration announces the creation of 15,000 new positions in immigration enforcement, with the intention of deporting illegal immigrants. They release a memo that sets the policy for the deportation of undocumented migrants accused of any crime.	Trump speaks at the NMAAHC
Wednesday, February 22	The Trump International Hotel Washington DC receives $40–60,000 from an event paid for by the Embassy of Kuwait, which had been argued to break the Domestic Emoluments Clause as Trump had not divested from his companies.; The Trump administration rescinds a bathroom policy for transgender students that had been instated by the Obama administration.; Secretary of State Tillerson meets with Julie Bishop, the foreign minister of Australia.; Secretary of State Tillerson and Secretary of Homeland Security Kelly arrive in Mexico for bilateral talks with the government of Mexican president Nieto.	Trump discusses the federal budget
Thursday, February 23	Trump meets with 24 manufacturing CEOs at the White House.; It is confirmed that six White House staff members, including Chief Digital Officer Gerrit Lansing, were removed from their positions earlier in the month after failing FBI background checks.; Press Secretary Spicer tells reporters the Trump administration plans on increasing enforcement of the Controlled Substances Act against recreational cannabis use.; Attorney General Sessions rescinds a memorandum signed by former President Obama meant to phase out private federal US prisons.; Secretary of State Tillerson and Secretary of Homeland Security Kelly meet Miguel Ángel Osorio Chong, the Mexican secretariat of the interior.; The Department of the Treasury sanctions Al-Nusra Front leaders.	Trump leads a meeting with manufacturing CEOs
Friday, February 24	Trump holds a bilateral meeting with Pedro Pablo Kuczynski, the president of Peru, at the White House.; Trump delivers a speech in Oxon Hill, Maryland to the 2017 Conservative Political Action Conference (CPAC). In the speech he addresses numerous themes including immigration, ISIS, coal mining and media reliability, suggesting limits on the use of anonymous sources by news agencies.; The BBC, BuzzFeed News, CNN, Politico, The Huffington Post, the Los Angeles Times and The New York Times are barred from the White House press briefing, prompting criticism from the White House Correspondents' Association.; Trump signs Executive Order 13777, requiring all federal agencies to create task forces to determine which regulations hurt the US economy.; Secretary of State Tillerson meets with Iraqi National Intelligence Service chief Mustafa Al-Kadhimi.	Trump and Kuczynski Trump at the 2017 CPAC
Saturday, February 25	Trump discusses the Affordable Care Act and the states' role in healthcare with Scott Walker, the governor of Wisconsin, and Rick Scott, the governor of Florida.; Trump becomes the first sitting president to skip the White House Correspondents' Dinner since 1981, when Ronald Reagan was recovering from an assassination attempt.	Trump's weekly address
Sunday, February 26	Philip M. Bilden withdraws his nomination for Secretary of the Navy.; Trump attends the National Governors Association dinner.	Trump at the Governor's Ball
Monday, February 27	Trump proposes a 10% increase in military spending of $54 billion, diverted from numerous other budgets including that of the State Department and the Environmental Protection Agency. Congress receives a letter criticizing this plan, signed by more than 120 retired US admirals and generals including George W. Casey Jr., a former Army chief of staff.; The Department of Justice drops a six-year lawsuit alleging the Texas Voter ID law is racist.; The Senate confirms Wilbur Ross as the 39th US Secretary of Commerce by a vote of 72–27.; Secretary of State Tillerson meets with Sameh Shoukry, the foreign minister of Egypt.	Trump at an NGA meeting
Tuesday, February 28	Wilbur Ross is sworn in as the 39th US Secretary of Commerce.; Ahead of his Congress speech, Trump meets privately with national news anchors, signaling his willingness to enact an immigration reform bill that could grant legal status to millions of undocumented immigrants.; Trump delivers his first address before a joint session of the members of Congress, addressing a wide range of matters including drug abuse, gang crime, immigration, terrorism, the US–Mexico border, infrastructure, foreign trade and the stock market.; Trump signs Executive Orders 13778 and 13779. The first initiates a review of the Clean Water Rule and the second is meant to "Promote Excellence and Innovation at Historically Black Colleges and Universities".; Trump signs a bill removing restrictions on the purchase of guns by persons with mental illnesses.; Secretary of State Tillerson meets with Chinese State Councilor Yang Jiechi.; To stop leaks, the White House approves a rule allowing staffers' cell phones to be searched.	Trump delivers an address during a joint session of Congress

=== March 2017 ===
Date	Events	Photos/videos
Wednesday, March 1	The Senate confirms Ryan Zinke as the 52nd US Secretary of the Interior by a vote of 68–31.; The House Intelligence Committee opens an inquiry into allegations of Russian interference in the 2016 US elections.; The Department of Justice confirms Attorney General Sessions met Russian ambassador Kislyak two times in 2016.; Trump proclaims March as the month of Women's History, Irish-American Heritage and the American Red Cross.; Secretary of State Tillerson meets with Borge Brende, the foreign minister of Norway.; Trump releases his 2017 Trade Policy Agenda.	Secretary of Commerce Ross addresses employees
Thursday, March 2	Trump tells reporters he has "total" confidence in Attorney General Sessions, then delivers a speech aboard the aircraft carrier USS Gerald R. Ford (CVN-78) reiterating his commitment to increase military spending.; Attorney General Sessions recuses himself from any inquiries involving allegations of Russian interference in the 2016 presidential election.; The Senate confirms Ben Carson as the 17th US Secretary of Housing and Urban Development by a vote of 58–41 and Rick Perry as the 14th US Secretary of Energy by a vote of 62–37.; The White House verifies White House adviser Kushner met with Russian ambassador Kislyak alongside Michael Flynn at New York City's Trump Tower in December 2016.; Secretary of State Tillerson meets with Yukiya Amano, the director general of the International Atomic Energy Agency.; On his first day, Secretary of the Interior Zinke signs two secretarial orders reducing regulations on hunting and angling on public lands.; The Environmental Protection Agency withdraws its request for information on equipment and emissions at existing operations for the oil and gas industry in response to H.J.Res.41.	Trump's weekly address, from aboard aircraft carrier USS Gerald R. Ford (CVN-78)
Friday, March 3	The White House hires three former lobbyists in agencies they had lobbied against, in violation of Trump's own ethics rules.; An ethics course for new White House staff is eliminated.; It is revealed that a personal email Pence had used as Governor of Indiana was hacked.; Trump and Secretary of Education Betsy DeVos visit Saint Andrew Catholic School in Orlando, Florida.; Trump attends a Republican fundraising event at the Four Seasons hotel in Palm Beach, Florida.; Secretary of State Rex Tillerson meets with Subrahmanyam Jaishankar, the foreign secretary of India.	Trump and DeVos with students of Saint Andrew Catholic School
Saturday, March 4	In a series of tweets, Trump publicly accuses former President Obama of intercepting communications at his offices in New York City's Trump Tower in October 2016. Obama spokesman Kevin Lewis denies the claim.; The White House proposes to cut the budget of the National Oceanic and Atmospheric Administration by 17%.; Trump squabbles with Arnold Schwarzenegger on Twitter over the ratings of The Apprentice which the latter had hosted after Trump had been fired from the series.; March 4 Trump rallies are held throughout the US in support of Trump.; Mexico opens legal-aid centers in its 50 US consulates to defend its citizens' rights amid the US crackdown on illegal immigration. Ralph Goodale, the minister of public safety, says Canada will not tighten its border because a greater number of migrants, reacting to the US immigration crackdown, are illegally crossing into Canada from the US.	A March 4 Trump demonstration in Washington DC
Sunday, March 5	James R. Clapper, a former Director of National Intelligence, denies the wiretapping claims of Trump's election campaign and states the agencies he supervised found "no evidence of collusion" between the campaign and Russian officials.; Congressman Devin Nunes (R-CA), chairman of the House Intelligence Committee, agrees to a demand from the White House for an investigation into abuses of executive power by former President Obama.	
Monday, March 6	Trump signs Executive Order 13780, effective March 16 and seen as a revised version of Executive Order 13769, removing Iraq from the affected countries and clarifying that lawful permanent residents are excluded from the travel ban. He also signs a memorandum to increase immigration law enforcement.; Trump proclaims March 5 as the start of National Consumer Protection Week.	Trump signs Executive Order 13780
Tuesday, March 7	Trump speaks on the telephone with Japanese prime minister Abe to voice his support for Japan in reaction to new reports of North Korean missile tests.; Trump supports a bill that would repeal the Affordable Care Act and leave 21 million people without health insurance, according to the Congressional Budget Office.; The White House verifies Trump has not conferred with the FBI over allegations of wiretapping by the previous administration.; Secretary of State Tillerson meets with Pavlo Klimkin, the foreign minister of Ukraine.	
Wednesday, March 8	Formal drafting of the repeal of the Affordable Care Act begins.; Federal Judge Derrick Watson permits Doug Chin, the attorney general of Hawaii, to submit a lawsuit against Trump's newly revised travel ban, to be heard on March 15.; Trump discusses reducing prescription drug prices with Democratic congressmen at the White House.; The Committee on Oversight and Government Reform writes to the White House, expressing concern that Trump's deletion of social media postings may constitute a violation of the Presidential Records Act.; Trump discusses immigration with Laurene Powell Jobs.; Secretary of State Tillerson meets with Avigdor Lieberman, the Israeli minister of defense.; Day Without a Woman strikes occur on International Women's Day in protest of the Trump administration.	A White House press briefing
Thursday, March 9	Trump pledges to remove certain regulations pertaining to the Dodd–Frank Wall Street Reform and Consumer Protection Act at a White House meeting with community bankers.; Trump-appointed Administrator of the Environmental Protection Agency Pruitt says he does not believe carbon dioxide is a primary contributor to global warming.; The states of Washington, New York, Oregon and Massachusetts join Minnesota and Hawaii's legal challenge of Trump's forthcoming travel ban.; The Office of Government Ethics demands reprimands for White House counselor Conway for advertising Ivanka Trump's products on television, which the White House refuses.; In an interview with Fox News, Pence states he learned from the day's news reports that former National Security Advisor Flynn was acting as an unregistered foreign agent of the Turkish government during the campaign.	Trump leads a National Economic Council meeting with the CEOs of small and community banks
Friday, March 10	Trump speaks by telephone with Mahmoud Abbas, the president of Palestine, extending a personal invitation to the White House.; Trump and Attorney General Sessions order the resignation of 46 US attorneys remaining from the Obama administration.; Former Trump campaign adviser Roger Stone acknowledges he had personal communication with Democratic National Committee hacker Guccifer 2.0.; Secretary of State Tillerson meets with the ambassadors to the US of ASEAN Member States as well as Jabbar Alluaibi, the Iraqi minister of oil.; Secretary of Health and Human Services Price announces his commitment to greater Medicaid flexibility for states.; Secretary of the Treasury Mnuchin announces the appointment of four senior staff.; Secretary of Defense Mattis responds to the US Armed Forces nude photo scandal, calling the actions "unacceptable".	A brainstorming session with members of Congress on replacing the Affordable Care Act
Saturday, March 11	Secretary of Homeland Security Kelly, Secretary of the Treasury Mnuchin, Secretary of Commerce Wilbur Ross and Secretary of Veterans Affairs David Shulkin meet with Trump at the Trump National Golf Club, where they discuss healthcare and the economy.	
Sunday, March 12	The House Intelligence Committee formally asks the White House to provide evidence for Trump's wiretapping claim.	
Monday, March 13	Trump holds the first cabinet meeting of his presidency.; Trump signs Executive Order 13781 to reduce the operating costs of the federal government.; Trump expands the power of the CIA to make drone strikes.; Press Secretary Spicer states Trump's wiretapping tweet was misinterpreted by the media, saying Trump meant the Obama administration was responsible, not Obama personally.; Secretary of State Tillerson meets with the foreign ministers of Tunisia, Greece and Saudi Arabia.	Trump at his first cabinet meeting
Tuesday, March 14	Trump hosts Saudi Deputy Crown Prince Mohammed bin Salman at the White House.; Rachel Maddow discloses a portion of Trump's 2005 tax returns (both sides of his Form 1040), mailed to David Cay Johnston by an unnamed source. The form shows a payment of $38.4 million on a $49.5-million adjusted gross income, accounting for $103.2 million in losses that year, with an effective tax rate of 25%. The White House verifies the cited figures and condemns the public release as "totally illegal".; Pence swears in Seema Verma as Administrator of the Centers for Medicare & Medicaid Services. Verma and Secretary of Health and Human Services Price reemphasize their commitment to states' roles in Medicaid programs.; Secretary of State Tillerson meets with Abdullah bin Zayed Al Nahyan, the foreign minister of the United Arab Emirates.	Pence swears in Verma
Wednesday, March 15	Trump makes remarks at the American Center for Mobility at Willow Run in Ypsilanti, Michigan, and later holds a political rally in Nashville, Tennessee, where he criticizes the court rulings against the travel ban.; Congressman Nunes reports the House Intelligence Committee has not discovered any evidence supporting Trump's wiretapping claim.; Federal Judge Watson issues a temporary nationwide restraining order on Trump's revised travel ban.; The Senate confirms Dan Coats as Director of National Intelligence in a vote of 85–12.; During a televised town-hall event, Secretary of Health and Human Services Price says it should be up to individual states to determine whether vaccinations should be required.; Ambassador to the UN Haley describes the idea of a Muslim ban as "un-American".; Secretary of State Tillerson makes his first official visit to Japan to discuss the threats posed by North Korea's missile program.	Trump leads a roundtable with CEOs and union workers
Thursday, March 16	The Trump administration releases a preliminary draft of its 2018 budget request. The budget's largest relative increases in spending include the Departments of Defense, Homeland Security and Veterans Affairs, while the largest cuts apply to the Environmental Protection Agency, Foreign Aid and the Departments of Labor and Agriculture, as well as a 20% cut to the National Institutes of Health. Trump also signs a memorandum directed at House Speaker Paul Ryan requesting additional funds for the Departments of Defense and Homeland Security.; Secretary of Housing and Urban Development Carson responds to Trump's proposed budget cuts to his department, saying it "recognizes a greater role for State and local governments, and the private sector to address community and economic development needs".; Trump holds a bilateral meeting with Enda Kenny, the Taoiseach, at the White House and announces his intention to visit the Republic of Ireland during his presidency.; Press Secretary Spicer repeats claims made by Andrew Napolitano that Britain's Government Communications Headquarters (GCHQ) conducted espionage against Trump.; Executive Order 13780 is scheduled to be put into effect. A second US federal judge, Theodore D. Chuang of Maryland, grants that state's motion for a temporary restraining order against Trump's revised travel ban.; Secretary of Homeland Security Kelly meets with Luis Guillermo Solís, the president of Costa Rica.	Trump and Kenny
Friday, March 17	Trump holds a bilateral meeting and joint press conference with German chancellor Merkel at the White House.; GCHQ denies all involvement in the alleged wiretapping of Trump Tower, prompting the Trump administration to issue a formal apology to the United Kingdom with assurances the allegation will not be repeated.; Secretary of State Tillerson visits South Korea to discuss international threats and indicates the possibility of military action against North Korea.; The White House announces it will appeal the Hawaii ruling against Trump's revised travel ban.; Pence meets with Costa Rican president Solís.; Trump proclaims March 19 as the start of National Poison Prevention Week.	A joint press conference between Trump and Merkel
Saturday, March 18	Trump speaks by telephone with Michel Temer, the president of Brazil, and Michelle Bachelet, the president of Chile.; Secretary of State Tillerson meets in Beijing with Wang Yi, the foreign minister of China, to discuss the North Korean missile program.; Secretary of the Treasury Mnuchin meets with G20 country finance ministers where he defends the Trump administration's trade policy of economic protectionism.	Trump's weekly address
Sunday, March 19	Ursula von der Leyen, the German minister of defence, rejects a statement by Trump on March 18 that Germany owes a financial debt to NATO.; Secretary of State Tillerson completes his diplomatic tour of eastern Asia with a meeting with Chinese president Xi in Beijing.	Tillerson shakes hands with Xi
Monday, March 20	Trump issues a tweet rejecting allegations of collusion with Russia as "fake news".; In a House Intelligence Committee hearing, FBI Director Comey states their investigation of Russian influence on the presidential election also covers possible links between Russia and Trump campaign figures and that the FBI has no evidence of wiretapping against Trump.; Trump meets with philanthropist Bill Gates.; Trump holds a bilateral meeting with Haider al-Abadi, the prime minister of Iraq, at the White House.; Trump holds an evening political rally in Louisville, Kentucky.; Trump nominates Judge Amul Thapar to the Sixth Circuit Court of Appeals.; The Senate Judiciary Committee begins hearings on the nomination of Judge Neil Gorsuch to the Supreme Court.; Trump signs a memorandum to "delegate to the Secretary of State the functions and authorities vested in the President by" the "Updated Plan for Verification and Monitoring of Proliferation of Nuclear Weapons and Fissile Material" section of the National Defense Authorization Act.	Trump and al-Abadi
Tuesday, March 21	Trump signs a bill which defines the budget and objectives of NASA, including a crewed mission to Mars as early as 2033. The draft 2018 budget expands support of public–private partnerships for deep-space habitation, revives a supersonic flight research program, strengthens NASA's cybersecurity, increases focus on planetary science and robotic exploration, cancels the Europa lander and Asteroid Redirect Mission, terminates four Earth science missions and eliminates the NASA Office of Education, resulting in an overall 0.8% budget decrease.; Congressman Nunes secretly visits the White House grounds to observe classified information concerning Trump's allegations of wiretapping.; Secretary of State Tillerson meets with Juan Orlando Hernández, the president of Honduras.; Trump proclaims March 21 as National Agriculture Day.; The Department of Labor pushes back the effective date of the Occupational Exposure to Beryllium rule by one month.	Trump receives a NASA flight jacket
Wednesday, March 22	Trump is briefed by Congressman Nunes, who also holds a news conference at the White House on the evidence concerning Trump's wiretapping allegations which he was shown on the White House grounds the previous day.; Trump offers British prime minister May the US's full support following a briefing by National Security Advisor McMaster on a fatal terrorist attack carried out near the Palace of Westminster in London.; Secretary of State Tillerson hosts a summit of 68 nations in Washington to discuss anti-ISIS strategy.; Secretary of Homeland Security Kelly meets with Honduran president Hernández.	A briefing from the Metropolitan Police Service following the Westminster terrorist attack
Thursday, March 23	The first major Congressional vote on Trump's planned repeal and replacement of the Affordable Care Act is postponed until March 24.; Trump signs a memorandum and a presidential notice to "continue the national emergency declared in Executive Order 13664 with respect to South Sudan".; Secretary of State Tillerson orders US diplomatic missions to identify "populations warranting increased scrutiny".	Secretary of Homeland Security Kelly with Honduran president Hernández
Friday, March 24	With Trump's consent, House Speaker Ryan indefinitely postpones the first major Congressional vote on the repeal and replacement of the Affordable Care Act due to lack of support from both sides of Congress.; Trump and Secretary of Defense Mattis host a group of prior medal recipients at the White House on the eve of National Medal of Honor Day.; Under Secretary of State Shannon issues a presidential permit to allow the construction of the Keystone XL pipeline by TransCanada Corporation.; Trump proclaims March 25 as Greek Independence Day and hosts a celebration in the East Room.; Secretary of State Tillerson meets with Khalid bin Ahmed Al Khalifa, the foreign minister of Bahrain.; During a visit to the Osceola County, Florida, campus of Valencia College, Secretary of Education DeVos says she is considering the extension of federal financial aid for students that are year-round and interested in placing more focus on community colleges.; The Department of Labor pushes back the Examinations of Working Places in Metal and Nonmetal Mines rule by two months.	Trump makes a statement on healthcare law
Saturday, March 25	Pro-Trump marches are held around the US. A notable march at Bolsa Chica State Beach in Huntington Beach, California, results in violence after a counter-protester pepper-sprays an organizer, prompting clashes and several arrests.	
Sunday, March 26	Pence delivers an evening speech to the American Israel Public Affairs Committee (AIPAC) at Washington DC's Verizon Center, reaffirming the US's commitment to Israeli defense and to preventing Iran's nuclear program from producing a weapon.	
Monday, March 27	Trump signs a memorandum creating the White House Office of American Innovation, consisting of two senior advisers and eight assistants to the president, to be headed by White House adviser Kushner.; Trump signs Executive Order 13782 which revokes Executive Orders 13673 and 13738 and section three of Executive Order 13683.; At the daily White House press briefing, Attorney General Sessions outlines plans to withhold funds and grants from sanctuary cities which refuse to fully enforce federal immigration laws.; Trump signs four Congressional Review Act disapproval resolutions into law, eliminating regulations from the Obama administration. The first repeals the Elementary and Secondary Education Act, the second removes regulations on teacher preparedness, the third deregulates resource management planning and the fourth nullifies the Federal Acquisition and Fair Pay and Safe Workspaces regulations.	Trump and Pence with Medal of Honor recipients
Tuesday, March 28	Trump signs Executive Order 13783 which removes a directive to consider climate change during deliberations under the National Environmental Policy Act, removes restrictions on fracking and directs the Environmental Protection Agency to suspend, revise or abolish the Clean Power Plan.; Trump suggests cuts of $18 billion to mental health, foreign aid, public housing and others including the McGovern-Dole International Food for Education and Child Nutrition Program.; Trump signs a bill ending the Fair Pay and Safe Workplaces regulation.; Press Secretary Spicer denies allegations the White House attempted to prevent former acting Attorney General Yates from testifying to the House Intelligence Committee.; In a lawsuit regarding The Apprentice, Trump invokes the Supremacy Clause.; Secretary of State Tillerson meets with the foreign ministers of Latvia, Lithuania and Estonia.; Secretary of the Interior Zinke hosts a media call about lifting the coal moratorium and American energy independence.; The Trump administration announces it will remove "sexual orientation" and "gender identity" as proposed subjects for possible inclusion on the Decennial Census and/or American Community Survey in the future.	Trump and Pence speak about Executive Order 13783
Wednesday, March 29	Trump signs Executive Order 13784 to combat drug addiction and the opioid epidemic. He also hosts a meeting in the Cabinet Room concerning opioids and drug abuse.; Trump issues a presidential notice continuing Executive Order 13694 which "[blocks] the property of certain persons engaging in significant malicious cyber-enabled activities".; Secretary of the Interior Zinke signs a secretarial order scaling back regulations on natural resources from the Obama administration.; Federal Judge Watson converts the temporary restraining order on Trump's travel ban into an indefinite preliminary injunction, citing evidence of a religious objective in violation of the Establishment Clause.; The White House verifies Ivanka Trump is to become an unpaid employee in the West Wing.; Secretary of Education DeVos delivers her first extended policy address at the Brookings Institution, stating an interest in implementing choice policies and criticizing policies from the Obama administration.; Administrator of the Environmental Protection Agency Pruitt denies the administrative petition by the Natural Resources Defense Council and the Pesticide Action Network North America to ban Chlorpyrifos.	Trump hosts a meeting concerning opioids and drug abuse
Thursday, March 30	Trump calls FBI Director Comey, asserting he was not involved with Russian hookers and asking Comey to "lift the cloud" of the Russia investigation.; Trump holds a bilateral meeting with Lars Løkke Rasmussen, the prime minister of Denmark, at the White House.; The Department of Justice issues a statement that it disagrees with Federal Judge Watson's March 29 ruling against the revised travel ban and that it will continue its legal contest to reactivate the ban.; Former National Security Advisor Flynn seeks immunity from the FBI in exchange for testimony on White House links to Russia.; Pence casts his second tie-breaking vote, voting to advance a bill to defund Planned Parenthood.; Ambassador to the UN Haley states the priority of US policy concerning Bashar al-Assad, the president of Syria, is no longer to force him out of power.; Attorney General Sessions meets with Attorneys General of El Salvador, Guatemala and Honduras.; Katie Walsh resigns as Deputy Chief of Staff.	Trump and Rasmussen
Friday, March 31	Secretary of Health and Human Services Price purchases $90,000 worth of pharmaceutical stocks a month before the signing of a bill which benefits them.; Trump issues a tweet describing allegations of links between Russia and his associates as a "witch hunt", recommending former National Security Advisor Flynn request immunity in return for testimony to the intelligence authorities.; Trump signs two executive orders aimed at preventing foreign trade abuses. The signing occurs in private after he leaves the public ceremony without signing the orders.; Trump and Pence meet with former Secretary of State Condoleezza Rice at the White House.; The Department of the Treasury announces new sanctions against North Korea in response to Kim Jong Un's continuing nuclear missile program.; District Judge David J. Hale rules against a freedom of speech defense by Trump's lawyers, permitting to proceed a lawsuit in which three plaintiffs allege Trump incited violence at a presidential campaign rally in 2016.; Trump proclaims April as the Month of Cancer Control, Child Abuse Prevention, Sexual Assault Awareness, Financial Capability and Donate Life. He also proclaims April 2 as Autism Awareness Day.; Trump nullifies a rule that limits drug-testing of state unemployment insurance holders.; Secretary of Transportation Chao announces $10 million for emergency repairs to Atlanta's collapsed Interstate 85 overpass.	Secretary of State Tillerson with NATO colleagues in Brussels, Belgium

== See also ==
- First 100 days of the first Trump presidency – Period from January to April 2017
- List of executive actions by Donald Trump
- Lists of presidential trips made by Donald Trump (international trips)
- First presidential transition of Donald Trump – Transfer of presidential power from Barack Obama to Donald Trump
- Timeline of the 2016 United States presidential election

US presidential administration timelines
Preceded by Obama presidency (2016–2017)	First Trump presidency (2017 Q1)	Succeeded by First Trump presidency (2017 Q2)
