= Charles Edge =

Charles Edge may refer to:

- Charles Edge (basketball) (born 1950), American basketball player
- Charles Edge (architect) (1800–1867), British architect
- Charles Edge (computer scientist), American computer scientist
