= Steve Edge (disambiguation) =

Steve Edge may refer to:

- Steve Edge (rugby league), Australian rugby league footballer
- Steve Edge (born 1972), English comedian and actor
- Steve Edge (lawyer) (born 1950), British corporate tax lawyer
