= Tom Homan =

American law enforcement officer (born 1961)

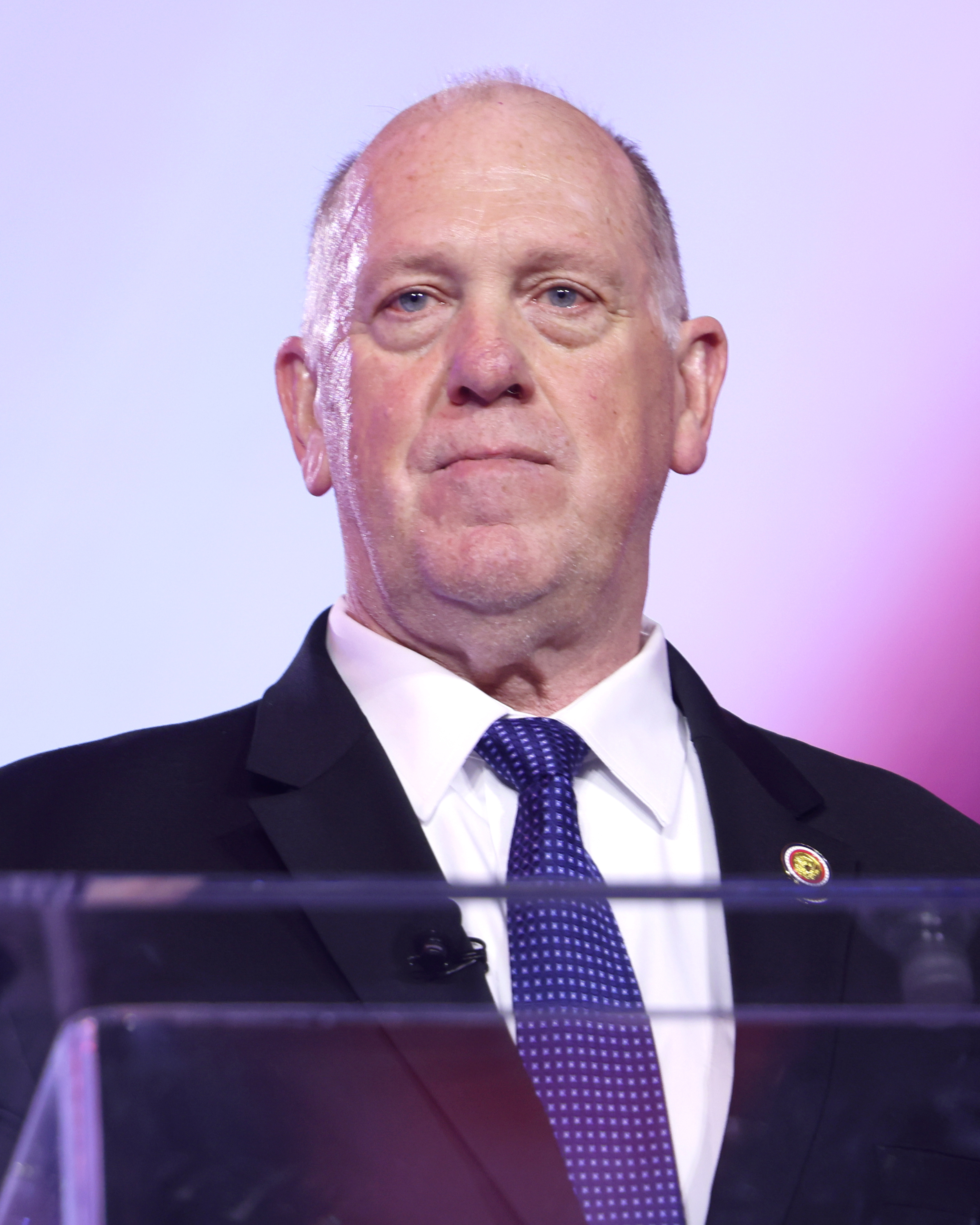
- Homan in 2025

White House Border Czar
- Incumbent
- Assumed office January 20, 2025
- President: Donald Trump
- Preceded by: Office established

Senior Official Performing the Duties of the Director of U.S. Immigration and Customs Enforcement
- In office January 30, 2017 – June 29, 2018; Acting: January 30, 2017 – November 14, 2017 (Note: Homan initially held the position of Acting Director. Following his nomination to become official Director on November 14, 2017, Homan became Deputy Director and Senior Official Performing the Duties of the Director to comply with the Vacancies Act, and held said title until his retirement.)
- President: Donald Trump
- Preceded by: Daniel Ragsdale (acting)
- Succeeded by: Ronald Vitiello (acting)

Deputy Director of U.S. Immigration and Customs Enforcement
- In office November 14, 2017 – June 29, 2018
- President: Donald Trump
- Preceded by: Daniel Ragsdale
- Succeeded by: Peter T. Edge (acting)

Personal details
- Born: Thomas Douglas Homan; November 28, 1961 (age 64) West Carthage, New York, U.S.
- Spouse: Elizabeth Homan (m. 1980)
- Children: 4
- Education: Jefferson Community College (AS); SUNY Polytechnic Institute (BS)
- Awards: Presidential Rank Award (2015)

Thomas Douglas Homan (born November 28, 1961) is an American law enforcement officer. In November 2024, Donald Trump designated Homan as "border czar" for his second presidency. Homan also served during the Obama administration and the first Trump administration. He served as acting director of the U.S. Immigration and Customs Enforcement (ICE) from January 2017 to June 2018.

Homan advocates deportation of illegal immigrants and opposes sanctuary city policies. In 2015, President Barack Obama awarded him a Presidential Rank Award for his effectiveness with illegal immigrant deportations. While serving under Obama, Homan proposed the potential effectiveness of family separation. In 2017, during the Trump administration, he expanded upon the idea and became the most vocal proponent of the administration's family separation policy as a means to deter illegal immigration. After 2018, he began contributing to Fox News as a commentator. Homan joined the Heritage Foundation in 2022 and became a contributor to Project 2025.

In September 2024, Homan was reportedly recorded accepting a bag containing $50,000 in cash from undercover FBI agents posing as business executives. The FBI was investigating allegations that Homan was accepting bribes from border security companies in exchange for the promise of government contracts if Trump won the 2024 election. In September 2025, the Department of Justice closed the investigation, citing insufficient evidence.

== Early life and career ==
Homan was born in West Carthage, New York, into a Roman Catholic family of seven children. His father and grandfather were West Carthage police officers. He received an associate degree in criminal justice from Jefferson Community College and a bachelor's degree in criminal justice from SUNY Polytechnic Institute.

In 1983, Homan became a West Carthage police officer. In 1984, he joined what was then called the U.S. Immigration and Naturalization Service. He served as a United States Border Patrol agent, investigator, and supervisor for 30 years. He quickly transferred from the Wellesley Island station to the Texas division and spent five years as a uniformed agent in California and Arizona.

Homan was a supervisor on the Texas border with Mexico in 2003.

== Obama administration (2014–2016) ==
Homan was appointed by President Barack Obama as Immigration and Customs Enforcement's executive associate director of enforcement and removal operations in 2013.

By 2014, under the Obama administration, Homan began to argue that separating children from their caregivers would be an effective way to discourage illegal border crossings. The journalist Caitlin Dickerson has called him the "intellectual father" of the policy, which he outlined years before the Trump administration adopted it. "Most parents don't want to be separated", Homan told Dickerson. He argued that this makes separation an effective tool for immigration enforcement: "I'd be lying to you if I didn't think that would have an effect."

In 2015, the Obama administration awarded him a Presidential Rank Award as a Distinguished Executive. The Washington Post wrote, "Thomas Homan deports people. And he's really good at it."

== First Trump administration (2017–2018) ==
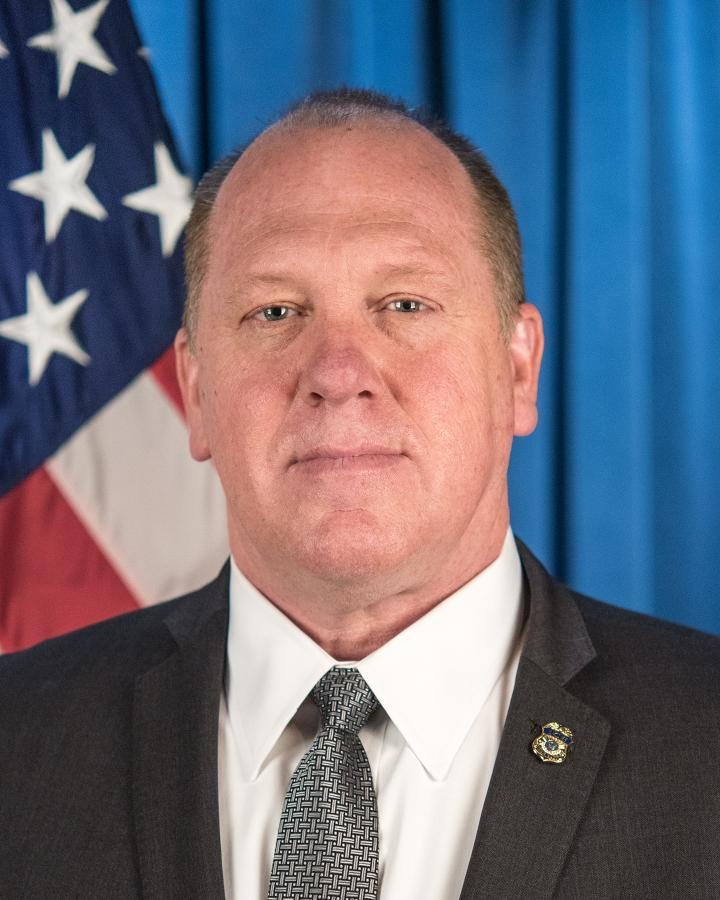
Homan in 2017

On January 30, 2017, President Trump demoted acting ICE director Daniel Ragsdale to deputy director, a position Ragsdale had held since 2012, and appointed Homan as acting director.

In May 2017, Homan announced ICE had arrested 41,319 people between Inauguration Day and the end of April, a 38% increase from the same period in 2016. In June, Homan said that illegal immigrants "should be afraid" but disputed that such aliens commit more crimes than US citizens.

On November 14, 2017, Trump nominated Homan for ICE director.

In February 2018, Homan said that politicians who support sanctuary city policies should be charged with crimes. In April 2018, he and Kevin McAleenan formally advised Secretary of Homeland Security Kirstjen Nielsen to implement the Trump administration's zero-tolerance policy on immigration, including the prosecution of parents and the separation of children from their families. Homan participated in the May 2018 press conference announcing that the policy was going into effect. On June 5, 2018, he appeared for a discussion with the policy director of the Center for Immigration Studies and defended the separation of children from their parents.

Homan retired as acting ICE director in June 2018.

== Between Trump administrations (2018–2024) ==
After 2018, Homan began contributing to Fox News as a commentator.

In July 2019, Homan testified before the U.S. House Oversight Committee regarding the Trump administration family separation policy.

Homan published "Defend the Border and Save Lives: Solving Our Most Important Humanitarian and Security Crisis" in March 2020.

In February 2022, Homan joined the Heritage Foundation, and became a contributor to its Project 2025, which proposes mass arrests, detentions and deportations of illegal immigrants across the nation, though his name is not listed on any specific chapter or policy ideas.

On February 25, 2022, Homan was slated as a keynote speaker for the America First Political Action Conference held near Orlando, Florida, but left before the conference began after learning that the conference's founder, Nick Fuentes, had praised Russian president Vladimir Putin for the invasion of Ukraine.

In November 2022, Homan launched a border-focused project called "Defend the Border and Save Lives" in collaboration with the United West, a Southern Poverty Law Center-designated anti-Muslim hate group. The project, which shares staff and an address with the United West, held a fundraising event at Mar-a-Lago that month, and has been criticized for promoting inflammatory rhetoric about immigration and Muslims.

At a July 2024 National Conservatism Conference meeting, Homan said that if "Trump comes back in January, I'll be on his heels coming back, and I will run the biggest deportation force this country has ever seen. They ain't seen shit yet. Wait until 2025." On July 17 at the 2024 Republican National Convention, he called Biden's immigration policies "national suicide" and told "millions of illegal aliens" to "start packing". Homan said that drug cartels would be designated as terrorist organizations and that Trump would "wipe them off the face of the earth".

Homan received at least $5,000 in consulting fees from GEO Group in the two years before he joined the second Trump administration. GEO Group is the United States' largest prison operator, with facilities including for-profit private prisons and immigration detention centers.

== Second Trump administration (2025–present) ==
President-elect Trump announced on November 10, 2024, that Homan would join the incoming administration as the "border czar", writing, "Homan will be in charge of all deportation of illegal aliens back to their country of origin." Trump planned to use the Alien Enemies Act of 1798 in efforts to deport illegal immigrants.

In February 2025, Hatewatch reported that Homan met multiple times with Proud Boys associate Terry Newsome. Two encounters occurred after the 2024 United States presidential election, presumably to discuss mass deportation. The Southern Poverty Law Center noted that "Homan was also a guest on Newsome's podcast in October 2024 and was a featured speaker at an anti-immigration event Newsome hosted in Chicago in June 2024."

Also in February 2025, while appearing with New York City mayor Eric Adams on the Fox News program Fox & Friends to discuss Adams's cooperation with ICE on immigration issues, Homan said, "If he doesn't come through, I'll be back in New York City, and we won't be sitting on the couch—I'll be in his office, up his butt, saying, 'Where the hell is the agreement we came to?'"

The same month, Homan got into a dispute with U.S. Representative Alexandria Ocasio-Cortez over educating immigrants about their constitutional rights, which he said "impedes" law enforcement. He said that he had asked the Department of Justice to investigate whether Ocasio-Cortez's actions impede ICE and whether she could be prosecuted, telling Fox News host Laura Ingraham, "maybe AOC's gonna be in trouble now." Ocasio-Cortez responded on social media: "'MaYbe shE's goiNg to be in TroUble nOw.' Maybe he can learn to read. The Constitution would be a good place to start."

In March 2025, two planeloads of people the Trump administration alleged were Venezuelan gang members were deported to El Salvador, defying a court order blocking the deportations. Homan told the media that the administration completed the deportations despite the court order because the court order was made when the planes were above international waters after leaving the U.S. He also said of deportations: "Another flight every day. [...] We are not stopping. I don't care what the judges think."

On April 17, 2025, Homan was interviewed by Kaitlan Collins about the deportation of American citizens to foreign prisons. He said that was "out of his lane" and threw the question over to Attorney General Pam Bondi.

The Trump administration said that around 140,000 people had been deported as of April 2025, though some estimates put the number at roughly half that amount.

On May 27, The Washington Post reported that Homan has disclosed consulting fees from the private prison firm GEO Group, one of the two publicly traded companies that profit from Trump's immigration policies.

Homan has been critical of people actively using their constitutional and legal rights and sharing knowledge of those rights, calling it "defiance", and has said that people knowing their rights impaired law enforcement activities.

In a June 2025 interview, Homan said that deportations should prioritize those who had committed crimes in the US.

== Bribery investigation ==
Homan was the subject of a federal bribery investigation after reportedly being recorded accepting a paper bag with $50,000 in cash from undercover FBI agents in September 2024. The agents were posing as contractors seeking to secure government contracts during a potential second Trump administration. On the tape, Homan appeared to indicate his willingness to help them if Trump returned to office. The payment was tied to a broader counterintelligence probe, not initially focused on Homan. Investigators reportedly began their inquiry into Homan after their initial target independently suggested that a payment to Homan would help the supposed contractors secure government business.

When Trump assumed the presidency in 2025, Justice Department officials including acting deputy attorney general Emil Bove closed the case, citing insufficient evidence that Homan had agreed to perform specific official acts in exchange for the money, and noting that he was not in government at the time of the meeting. Bove, displeased with the case, called it an effort of the "deep state", invoking the belief that shadowy unelected officials controlled the government at the time of the probe. White House spokesperson Karoline Leavitt acknowledged that the meeting took place but denied allegations of wrongdoing, saying that Homan "never took the $50,000 you're referring to" and accusing the FBI of trying to "entrap one of the president's top allies." In an interview later that day, Homan did not respond when asked if he had accepted the money but said he "did nothing criminal." A nonprofit organization subsequently sued the Department of Justice to release key recordings of the bribery scheme.

== Personal life ==
Homan has described himself as "a lifelong Catholic", has been described as "a devout Mass-goer", and was critical of Pope Francis's position on immigration. He is married to Elizabeth Homan and they have four children.

== Notes ==
Government offices
Preceded by Daniel Ragsdale	Deputy Director of U.S. Immigration and Customs Enforcement; 2017–2018	Succeeded by Peter T. Edge; Acting
Preceded by Daniel Ragsdale; Acting	Director of U.S. Immigration and Customs Enforcement; Acting; 2017–2018	Succeeded by Ronald Vitiello; Acting
Political offices
New office	White House Border Czar; 2025–present	Incumbent
