= Sarah Saldaña =

Director of ICE from 2014 to 2017

Sarah R. Saldaña
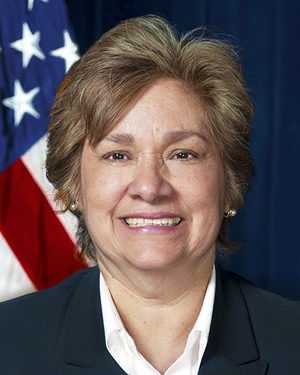
- Official portrait, 2014

Director of United States Immigration and Customs Enforcement
- In office December 23, 2014 – January 20, 2017
- President: Barack Obama
- Preceded by: John T. Morton
- Succeeded by: Daniel Ragsdale (acting)

United States Attorney for the Northern District of Texas
- In office September 29, 2011 – December 22, 2014
- President: Barack Obama

Personal details
- Born: Sarah Ruth Saldaña; 1951 (age 74–75) Corpus Christi, Texas, U.S.
- Education: Del Mar College (AS); Texas A&I University (BS); Southern Methodist University (JD)

Sarah Ruth Saldaña is an American attorney who served as the fourth director of U.S. Immigration and Customs Enforcement (ICE) from December 23, 2014, until January 20, 2017, under President Barack Obama. She was the first Latina and the second woman (after Julie Myers) to hold the position of ICE director. Previously she had served as Assistant U.S. Attorney, then U.S. Attorney, for the Northern District of Texas.

== Birth, education and early career ==
Saldaña was born in 1951 in Corpus Christi, Texas, as the youngest of seven children. Her father Luis was a plumber and her mother, Inez Garcia Saldaña, was a nurse. She graduated from W.B. Ray High School in 1970 and attended and got an associate degree from Del Mar Junior College. She graduated from Texas A&I University summa cum laude in August 1973. After teaching eighth grade language arts in Dallas, she began working in June 1974 for the Equal Employment Opportunity Commission as a technician, then in 1975 she became a management intern for the Department of Housing and Urban Development, returning to the EEOC as an investigator later in 1975. From 1976 to 1981, Saldaña worked for the Department of Labor's Employment and Training Administration.

She earned a JD from Southern Methodist University in May 1984. She was admitted to the Texas Bar in November 1984.

== Legal career ==
After graduation from law school, Saldaña clerked for U.S. District Judge Barefoot Sanders in 1984–1985, then entered private law practice from 1985–1987 with the law firm of Haynes and Boone, working in communications law and employment law. She then moved to the large law firm Baker Botts for 11 years as a trial attorney, first as an associate, then from 1994-1998 as a partner. She was an unsuccessful candidate for a judgeship in 2002.

Saldaña started as an Assistant U.S. Attorney in 2004, prosecuting fraud and corruption cases, eventually becoming Deputy Criminal Chief in charge of the Northern District's Major Fraud and Public Corruption section. One major bribery and extortion case prosecuted by her office concerning affordable housing contracts was described by a major Dallas newspaper as “the largest in Dallas history”; as one result, Dallas city council member and Mayor Pro Tem Don Hill was convicted and sentenced to 18 years.

In 2011, the Hispanic National Bar Association named Saldaña as the Latina Attorney of the Year.

Saldaña in 2011 became U.S. Attorney for the Northern District of Texas. Cases she prosecuted included bank and mortgage fraud, civil rights, human trafficking, and public corruption.

== Director of Immigration and Customs Enforcement ==
Saldaña was nominated as Director of Immigration and Customs Enforcement by President Barack Obama in September 2014. After being approved unanimously by the Senate Homeland Security and Governmental Affairs Committee, the Obama administration announced actions to shield immigrants from deportation, and the subsequent vote by the Senate Judiciary Committee on her nomination was 10–8, with all Republicans voting against. She was confirmed 55–39 on December 16, 2014, and sworn in on December 23, 2014. As of 2026, Saldaña is the last person to be confirmed by the U.S. Senate to serve as Director.

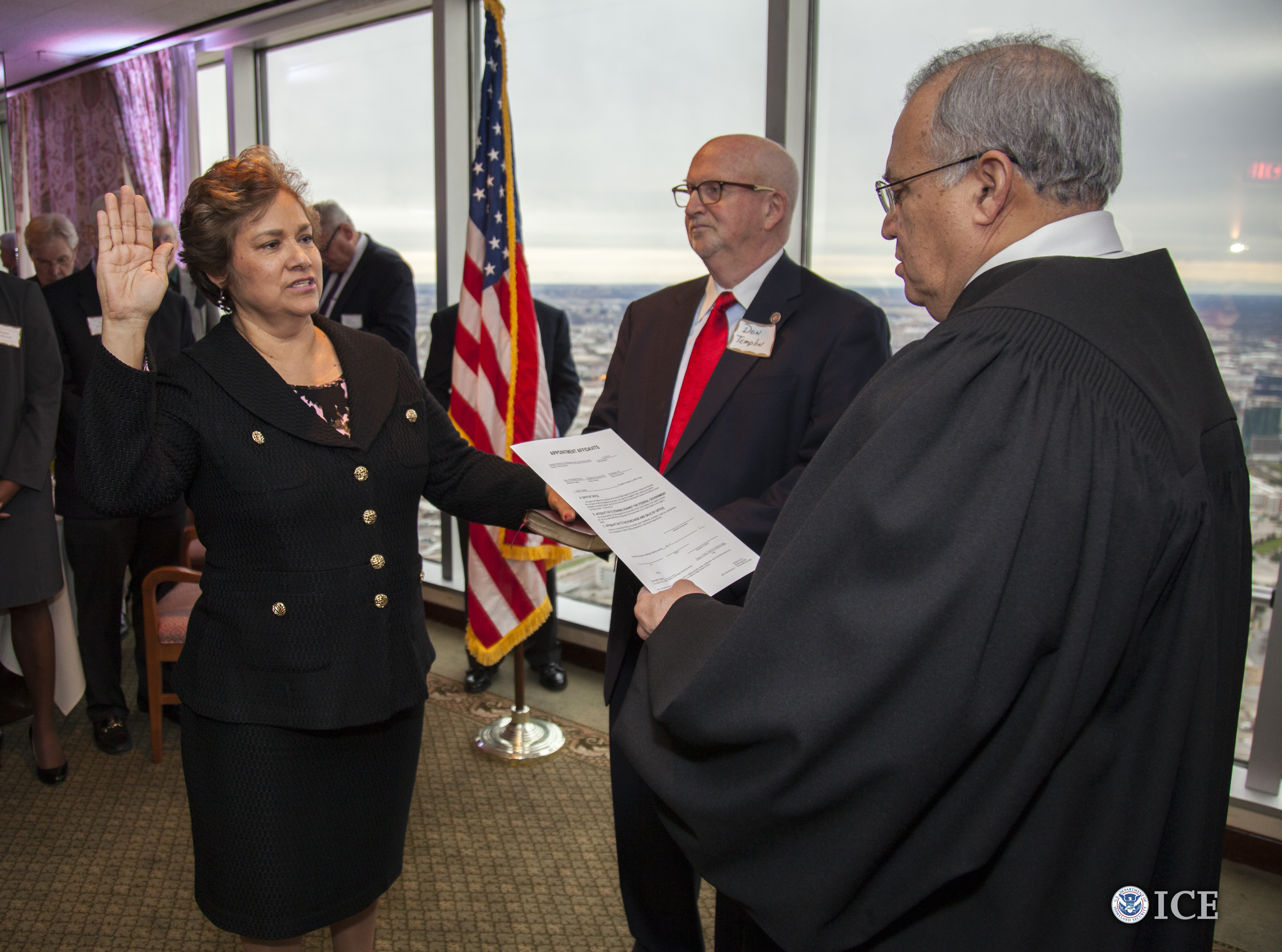
Swearing-in of Sarah Saldaña as Director of ICE, December 23, 2014

During Saldaña's tenure, ICE had a budget of approximately $6 billion and had nearly 20,000 employees in 400 offices in all 50 states, the District of Columbia, and 48 countries outside the United States.

During Saldaña's years as ICE director, employee morale at ICE, which had been in decline since 2009, underwent a strong surge. Then-Acting Deputy Secretary Russell C. Deyo praised Saldaña's law enforcement leadership and employee engagement efforts at her retirement ceremony on January 11, 2017, noting that ICE's global employee satisfaction score had risen 11%. A subsequent think-tank study used the employee morale scores calculated on 14 criteria by the Partnership for Public Service's Best Places to Work in the Federal Government, noting that scores at ICE during Saldaña's leadership increased by 20 points in almost all categories from May 2015 to May 2017.

Saldaña was criticized from the political left for treating noncriminal refugees too harshly and from the political right for allowing immigrant criminals back on the street. Her answer to critics was that she was required to follow the laws and the decisions of courts, and she defended the removal prioritization of public safety and national security threats, multiple offenders, and recent border crossers.

In her first Congressional testimony as director of ICE on April 14, 2015, Saldaña defended ICE's enforcement priorities, promised to convince states and cities to cooperate with ICE, and was questioned regarding ICE's detention of Central American families fleeing violence there. Saldaña noted the end of the Secure Communities program and its replacement with the Priority Enforcement Program. ICE's family detention policies were criticized by almost all Democratic members. Saldaña asked for more funding for judges and legal representation for children.

In Congressional testimony in September 2016, Saldaña defended ICE's use of private detention companies to hold those awaiting removal on practical grounds, saying ICE had no practical alternative in order to provide facilities for holding up to 34,000 people, as required by Congress.

Her tenure ended with the change of Presidential administrations on January 20, 2017. She was succeeded on an acting basis by her deputy, Daniel Ragsdale, a career member of the Senior Executive Service.

== Post-DHS Commentary on Immigration and Justice Issues ==
In June 2018, Saldaña, then retired and living in Dallas, Texas, spoke out publicly against Trump administration “zero-tolerance” immigration policies. “Every dollar we spend in criminally pursuing an immigrant mother, or father or infant,” Saldaña said, “is money taken away from [pursuing] drug cartels, financial crime or cyber hacking. Stuff that impacts the American public much more than an immigrant working on your front lawn.” She wrote an OpEd in Time magazine to the same effect.

On February 28, 2020, Saldaña and Matthew D. Orwig, who like Saldaña also served as a U.S. Attorney in Texas, in his case appointed by President George W. Bush, wrote an OpEd in the Dallas Morning News on the importance of protecting the independence of the Department of Justice.

On April 27, 2021, Saldaña gave an interview to the CBS News Dallas-Fort Worth affiliate calling for Congress to pass immigration reform, saying “the system is overwhelmed” and “legislation is the best fix, not a temporary Band Aid here and there”. To critics at both ends of the immigration debate she said “the wish was to keep us a nation onto our own, an island onto our own. As I say, that is just not realistic. On the other side, we have individuals advocate for the immigrant population who say, just let everybody in, that is not going to happen. It would be illegal to allow that happen.” She called for additional resources for ICE to work with church and community organizations.

== Honors and personal life ==
Among Saldaña's awards and recognitions are the 2017 Dallas Women Lawyers Louise B. Raggio Award, 2015 Southern Methodist University Distinguished Hispanic Alumna; 2014 Trailblazer of the Year, Hispanic Women's Network of Texas; 2012 Southern Methodist University Law Distinguished Alumna – Government Service; 2012 La Luz Achievement, Dallas Hispanic Bar Association; and the 2012 Mujeres en Acción (Women in Action), UT Chicano/Hispanic Law Students Association.

Saldaña is married to Marine veteran Don Templin, a retired attorney. She had two sons and a daughter. She is a member of the Unitarian Church. She has served as a board member or leader of a number of bar, religious and charitable organizations. A sister, Marisela Saldaña, was a district court judge for District 148 in Corpus Christi, Texas, in 2006–2010.

Government offices
Preceded by Thomas S. Winkowski	Director of the U.S. Immigration and Customs Enforcement; December 23, 2014 - January 20, 2017	Succeeded by Daniel Ragsdale(Acting)
