= Peter T. Edge =

American government official

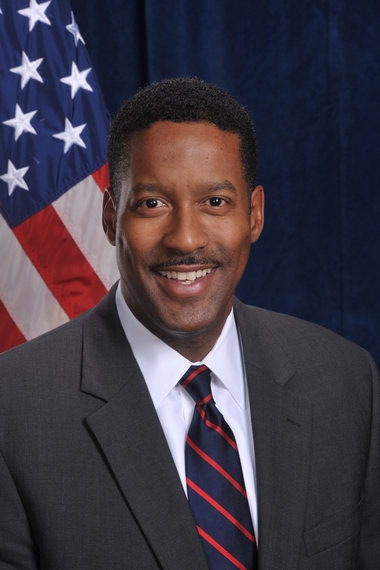

Acting Deputy Director of Immigration and Customs Enforcement
- In office May 2017 – August 1, 2018
- President: Donald Trump
- Preceded by: Daniel Ragsdale
- Succeeded by: Matthew Albence

Peter T. Edge is a retired American government official who last served as the Executive Associate Director of Homeland Security Investigations and also served as the Acting Deputy Director of U.S. Office of Immigration and Customs Enforcement.

== Career ==
Edge started his career as an investigator in the Essex County Prosecutor's Office in New Jersey. He gained experience as an investigator in his capacity as Special Agent in Charge of the Homeland Security Investigations office in Newark.
