= Dawn Edge =

British medical researcher

- Born: Dawnette Ethilda Edge
- Education: University of Salford; University of Manchester
- Scientific career
- Fields: Health research Schizophrenia; Perinatal mental health Ethnicity
- Workplaces: University of Manchester
- Thesis: Perinatal depression among women of Black Caribbean origin : a longitudinal cohort study of prevalence, beliefs and attitudes to help seeking (2002)
- Website: www.research.manchester.ac.uk/portal/dawn.edge.html

Dawnette Ethilda Edge is a British medical researcher and senior lecturer in psychology, who is professor of mental health and inclusivity at the University of Manchester. Her research investigates racial inequalities in mental health, including the origins of the overdiagnosis of schizophrenia in British African-Caribbean people.

== Early life and education ==
Edge studied healthcare and welfare at the University of Salford, where she graduated with first-class honours in 1993. She eventually trained in social sciences, completing a master's degree in social sciences also at the University of Salford. She also holds qualifications in teaching psychotherapy and is a member of the Chartered Society of Physiotherapy.

Edge eventually joined the University of Manchester as a graduate student, where she was supported by the NHS North West partnership. Edge earned her doctorate in medical sociology in 2003. Her doctoral research investigated maternal mental health and how Black mothers accessed mental health services before and after giving birth.

== Research and career ==
Edge was appointed to the board of trustees for African and Caribbean Mental Health Services, a grassroots organisation that looks to empower individuals to identify their mental health needs. Informed by her experiences on the board, Edge switched her focus to evidence-based interventions for communities of colour. As part of this work, she established a series of community-focussed mental health conferences that brought together members of NHS Mental Health Services Trusts, academics and volunteer groups.

In 2006, Edge was appointed to the faculty at the University of Manchester, where she was eventually promoted to Professor of Mental Health. She became concerned that African and Caribbean populations were being over-diagnosed with mental illnesses such as schizophrenia. The National Institute for Health and Care Excellence (NICE) guidelines include family interventions, but these are not always offered to non-white people. Edge has shown that Black people are more likely to experience a negative pathway in mental health care compared to their white counterparts. She has shown that they are more likely to be sectioned by the Mental Health Act, which can result in the breakdown of close relationships, and make effective family interventions unlikely. Supported by the National Institute for Health Research (NIHR), Edge has looked to develop culturally-sensitive family interventions.

Edge spent 2014 as a visiting scholar in Canada and the United States of America, where she studied how the countries supported the mental health of African Caribbean populations. Her research has been funded by the Medical Research Council (MRC).

=== Academic service ===
Edge is an academic lead for equality, diversity and inclusion (EDI) at the University of Manchester. As part of this work, she is involved with the submission to the Race Equality Charter.

== Selected publications ==
- Nadeem, Erum; Lange, Jane M.; Edge, Dawn; Fongwa, Marie; Belin, Tom; Miranda, Jeanne (2007). "Does Stigma Keep Poor Young Immigrant and U.S.-Born Black and Latina Women From Seeking Mental Health Care?". Psychiatric Services. 58 (12): 1547–1554. doi:10.1176/ps.2007.58.12.1547. ISSN 1075-2730. PMID 18048555.
- Edge, Dawn; Rogers, Anne (2005). "Dealing with it: Black Caribbean women's response to adversity and psychological distress associated with pregnancy, childbirth, and early motherhood". Social Science & Medicine. 61 (1): 15–25. doi:10.1016/j.socscimed.2004.11.047. ISSN 0277-9536. PMID 15847958.
- Kovandžić, Marija; Chew-Graham, Carolyn; Reeve, Joanne; Edwards, Suzanne; Peters, Sarah; Edge, Dawn; Aseem, Saadia; Gask, Linda; Dowrick, Christopher (2011). "Access to primary mental health care for hard-to-reach groups: From 'silent suffering' to 'making it work'" (PDF). Social Science & Medicine. 72 (5): 763–772. doi:10.1016/j.socscimed.2010.11.027. ISSN 0277-9536. PMID 21272968.
