= 2017 opinion polling on the Trump administration =

Surveying on 2017–2021 US presidency

== December ==
Area polled	Segment polled	Polling group	Date	Approve	Disapprove	Unsure	Sample size	Polling method	Source(s)
South Carolina	Likely voters	Trafalgar Group	December 29–30, 2017	53%	42%	4%	2,223	telephone and online	
Minnesota	Registered voters	Public Policy Polling	December 26–27, 2017	44%	53%	2%	671	telephone and online	
United States	All adults	YouGov (for The Economist)	December 24–26, 2017	38%	52%	9%	1,500	online	
United States	All adults	Morning Consult (for Politico)	December 21–24, 2017	41%	53%	6%	2,201	online	
United States	All adults	American Research Group	December 17–20, 2017	34%	62%	4%	1,100	telephone	
United States	All adults	YouGov (for The Economist)	December 17–19, 2017	38%	52%	10%	1,500	online	
United States	All adults	Ipsos (for Reuters)	December 15–19, 2017	35%	60%	5%	2,492	online	
United States	Registered voters	Morning Consult (for Politico)	December 14–18, 2017	41%	55%	5%	1,991	online	
United States	Likely voters	McLaughlin & Associates	December 14–18, 2017	45%	53%	2%	1,000	online	
United States	Registered voters	Quinnipiac University	December 13–18, 2017	37%	59%	5%	1,230	telephone	
United States	All adults	CNN	December 14–17, 2017	35%	59%	6%	1,001	telephone	
California	Registered voters	University of California, Berkeley	December 7–16, 2017	30%	66%	4%	1,000	telephone	
United States	All adults	NBC News/The Wall Street Journal	December 13–15, 2017	41%	56%	3%	900	telephone	
Mississippi	Registered voters	Mason-Dixon Polling & Research Inc.	December 13–15, 2017	51%	43%	6%	625	telephone	
United States	All adults	CNBC	December 10–13, 2017	42%	49%	9%	800	telephone	
United States	All adults	SurveyMonkey	December 7–13, 2017	40%	58%	2%	11,427	online	
United States	Registered voters	Public Policy Polling	December 11–12, 2017	41%	56%	3%	862	telephone and online	
Tennessee	Registered voters	Gravis Marketing	December 11–12, 2017	52%	41%	7%	563	telephone and online	
United States	All adults	YouGov (for The Economist)	December 10–12, 2017	38%	51%	12%	1,500	online	
United States	All adults	Monmouth University	December 10–12, 2017	32%	56%	12%	806	telephone	
United States	All adults	Ipsos (for Reuters)	December 8–12, 2017	33%	61%	5%	1,457	online	
United States	Registered voters	Harvard University/The Harris Poll	December 8–11, 2017	41%	59%	---	1,989	online	
United States	Registered voters	Morning Consult (for Politico)	December 8–11, 2017	43%	52%	5%	1,955	online	
United States	All adults	Associated Press/NORC at the University of Chicago	December 7–11, 2017	32%	67%	---	1,020	telephone and online	
United States	Registered voters	Quinnipiac University	December 6–11, 2017	37%	57%	7%	1,211	telephone	
(New York (state)) New York	All adults	NY1 News/Baruch College	November 30 – December 10, 2017	27%	64%	7%	800	telephone	
Alabama	Likely voters	Monmouth University	December 6–9, 2017	53%	44%	3%	546	telephone	
Alabama	Likely voters	Gravis Marketing	December 5–8, 2017	55%	42%	3%	1,254	telephone and online	
United States	All adults	Marist College	December 4–7, 2017	37%	56%	7%	1,267	telephone	
Iowa	All adults	The Des Moines Register/Mediacom	December 3–6, 2017	35%	60%	5%	802	telephone	
United States	All adults	SurveyMonkey	November 30 – December 6, 2017	39%	58%	2%	16,149	online	
United States	All adults	CBS News	December 3–5, 2017	36%	57%	6%	1,120	telephone	
United States	All adults	YouGov (for The Economist)	December 3–5, 2017	37%	51%	11%	1,500	online	
Tennessee	Registered voters	Vanderbilt University	November 16 – December 5, 2017	48%	47%	3%	1,013	telephone	
United States	All adults	Pew Research Center	November 29 – December 4, 2017	32%	63%	5%	1,503	telephone	
United States	Registered voters	Quinnipiac University	November 29 – December 4, 2017	35%	58%	7%	1,508	telephone	
United States	All adults	Investor's Business Daily	November 27 – December 4, 2017	36%	59%	2%	901	telephone	
United States	Registered voters	Morning Consult (for Politico)	December 1–3, 2017	45%	51%	4%	1,997	online	
Alabama	Likely voters	Gravis Marketing	December 1–3, 2017	51%	45%	4%	1,276	telephone and online	
Alabama	Registered voters	YouGov (for CBS News)	November 28 – December 1, 2017	57%	42%	---	1,067	online	

majority approve plurality approve majority disapprove plurality disapprove

== November ==
Area polled	Segment polled	Polling group	Date	Approve	Disapprove	Unsure	Sample size	Polling method	Source(s)
Alabama	Likely voters	The Washington Post/Schar School of Policy and Government	November 27–30, 2017	53%	45%	2%	739	telephone	
United States	All adults	Lucid	November 28–29, 2017	35%	52%	12%	923	online	
United States	All adults	SurveyMonkey (for NBC News)	November 27–29, 2017	40%	58%	1%	3,772	online	
Alabama	Likely voters	JMC Analytics	November 27–28, 2017	52%	43%	6%	650	telephone	
United States	All adults	YouGov (for The Economist)	November 26–28, 2017	39%	53%	8%	1,500	online	
United States	All adults	Ipsos (for Reuters)	November 24–28, 2017	38%	57%	5%	1,969	online	
United States	Registered voters	Morning Consult (for Politico)	November 21–25, 2017	43%	52%	5%	1,994	online	
United States	All adults	Saint Leo University	November 19–24, 2017	41%	54%	5%	1,000	online	
United States	All adults	Ipsos (for Reuters)	November 17–22, 2017	36%	59%	5%	1,489	online	
United States	All adults	Lucid	November 21, 2017	38%	50%	13%	965	online	
Minnesota	Registered voters	SurveyUSA (for KSTP-TV Minneapolis)	November 20–21, 2017	31%	54%	14%	518	telephone	
United States	All adults	YouGov (for The Economist)	November 19–21, 2017	37%	54%	9%	1,500	online	
United States	All adults	American Research Group	November 17–20, 2017	35%	61%	4%	1,100	telephone	
Tennessee	Registered voters	Mason-Dixon Polling & Research Inc.	November 17–20, 2017	51%	42%	7%	625	telephone	
North Carolina	Registered voters	Mason-Dixon Polling & Research Inc.	November 17–20, 2017	43%	52%	5%	625	telephone	
United States	Registered voters	Quinnipiac University	November 15–20, 2017	38%	55%	7%	1,415	telephone	
United States	Registered voters	Morning Consult (for Politico)	November 16–19, 2017	44%	50%	6%	2,586	online	
California	All adults	Public Policy Institute of California	November 10–19, 2017	28%	68%	5%	1,687	telephone	
North Carolina	All adults	High Point University#HPU Poll/High Point University	November 10–16, 2017	33%	54%	13%	469	telephone	
Alabama	Likely voters	Gravis Marketing	November 14–15, 2017	53%	43%	4%	628	telephone and online	
United States	All adults	NPR/PBS NewsHour/Marist	November 13–15, 2017	39%	55%	6%	1,019	telephone	
Alabama	Registered voters	Fox News	November 13–15, 2017	53%	45%	2%	823	telephone	
United States	All adults	SurveyMonkey	November 9–15, 2017	41%	57%	2%	19,325	online	
United States	All adults	YouGov (for The Economist)	November 12–14, 2017	34%	55%	11%	1,500	online	
United States	Registered voters	Harvard University/The Harris Poll	November 11–14, 2017	41%	59%	---	2,350	online	
United States	All adults	Ipsos (for Reuters)	November 10–14, 2017	37%	59%	4%	1,520	online	
United States	Likely voters	McLaughlin & Associates	November 9–13, 2017	44%	53%	2%	1,000	online	
United States	All adults	Kaiser Family Foundation	November 8–13, 2017	40%	56%	4%	1,201	telephone	
United States	Registered voters	Quinnipiac University	November 7–13, 2017	35%	58%	7%	1,577	telephone	
United States	Registered voters	Morning Consult (for Politico)	November 9–11, 2017	42%	52%	5%	1,993	online	
Alabama	Likely voters	Emerson College	November 9–11, 2017	58%	36%	6%	600	telephone and online	
Alabama	Likely voters	JMC Analytics	November 9–11, 2017	52%	41%	7%	575	telephone	
Alabama	Likely voters	Gravis Marketing	November 10, 2017	56%	41%	3%	478	telephone and online	
Virginia	Registered voters	Public Policy Polling	November 9–10, 2017	42%	54%	4%	797	telephone and online	
United States	All adults	Marist College	November 6–9, 2017	39%	53%	7%	1,074	telephone	
North Carolina	Registered voters	Elon University	November 6–9, 2017	37%	57%	5%	771	telephone	
United States	All adults	Lucid	November 7–8, 2017	38%	47%	15%	1,274	online	
United States	All adults	SurveyMonkey	November 2–8, 2017	41%	57%	2%	19,325	online	
United States	All adults	YouGov (for The Economist)	November 5–7, 2017	37%	54%	9%	1,500	online	
United States	All adults	Ipsos (for Reuters)	November 3–7, 2017	35%	60%	5%	1,572	online	
Maryland	Registered voters	OpinionWorks	October 25 – November 7, 2017	34%	63%	4%	850	telephone and online	
Massachusetts	Registered voters	Western New England University	October 24 – November 7, 2017	19%	76%	5%	437	telephone	
United States	Likely voters	Zogby Analytics	November 3–6, 2017	37%	60%	4%	884	online	
United States	Registered voters	Morning Consult (for Politico)	November 2–6, 2017	44%	51%	5%	1,991	online	
California	Registered voters	Los Angeles Times/USC Dornsife	October 27 – November 6, 2017	22%	66%	8%	1,296	online	
United States	All adults	CNN	November 2–5, 2017	36%	58%	6%	1,021	telephone	
Virginia	Likely voters	Monmouth University	November 2–5, 2017	41%	53%	5%	713	telephone	
Florida	Registered voters	Florida Atlantic University	November 2–5, 2017	41%	47%	12%	500	telephone and online	
North Carolina	All adults	High Point University#HPU Poll/High Point University	October 27 – November 4, 2017	33%	55%	12%	352	telephone	
United States	All adults	Investor's Business Daily	October 26 – November 3, 2017	36%	58%	1%	917	telephone	
Virginia	Likely voters	Siena College (for The New York Times)	October 29 – November 2, 2017	39%	51%	10%	985	telephone	
Virginia	Likely voters	Roanoke College	October 29 – November 2, 2017	36%	53%	2%	781	telephone	
United States	All adults	Lucid	October 31 – November 1, 2017	37%	52%	11%	1,315	online	
Virginia	Likely voters	Suffolk University	October 30 – November 1, 2017	37%	55%	7%	500	telephone	
United States	All adults	ABC News/The Washington Post	October 29 – November 1, 2017	37%	59%	4%	1,005	telephone	
United States	All adults	SurveyMonkey	October 26 – November 1, 2017	41%	58%	2%	13,308	online	

majority approve plurality approve majority disapprove plurality disapprove

== October ==
Area polled	Segment polled	Polling group	Date	Approve	Disapprove	Unsure	Sample size	Polling method	Source(s)
United States	All adults	YouGov (for The Economist)	October 29–31, 2017	40%	52%	8%	1,500	online	
United States	All adults	Ipsos (for Reuters)	October 27–31, 2017	36%	60%	4%	1,798	online	
United States	All adults	CBS News	October 27–30, 2017	39%	55%	6%	1,109	telephone	
United States	Registered voters	Morning Consult (for Politico)	October 26–30, 2017	44%	52%	4%	1,990	online	
United States	All adults	Pew Research Center	October 25–30, 2017	34%	59%	7%	1,504	telephone	
United States	All adults	Public Religion Research Institute	October 18–30, 2017	41%	54%	5%	2,019	telephone	
United States	Registered voters	Public Policy Polling	October 27–29, 2017	38%	56%	6%	572	telephone and online	
Virginia	Likely voters	The Washington Post/Schar School of Policy and Government	October 26–29, 2017	38%	59%	3%	921	telephone	
Virginia	Likely voters	Quinnipiac University	October 25–29, 2017	34%	60%	6%	916	telephone	
New Jersey	Likely voters	Suffolk University/USA Today Network	October 25–28, 2017	31%	59%	10%	500	telephone	
Kentucky	All adults	Western Kentucky University	October 16–27, 2017	50%	42%	8%	562	telephone	
United States	All adults	NBC News/The Wall Street Journal	October 23–26, 2017	38%	58%	4%	900	telephone	
United States	All adults	Lucid	October 24–25, 2017	37%	51%	12%	1,300	online	
United States	All adults	SurveyMonkey	October 19–25, 2017	39%	59%	2%	13,572	online	
United States	Likely voters	Zogby Analytics	October 19–25, 2017	44%	53%	3%	1,514	online	
United States	Registered voters	Fox News	October 22–24, 2017	38%	57%	5%	1,005	telephone	
United States	All adults	YouGov (for The Economist)	October 22–24, 2017	37%	53%	9%	1,500	online	
United States	All adults	Ipsos (for Reuters)	October 20–24, 2017	35%	60%	5%	2,352	online	
New Jersey	Likely voters	Quinnipiac University	October 19–24, 2017	33%	65%	2%	1,049	telephone	
United States	Registered voters	Morning Consult (for Politico)	October 19–23, 2017	42%	53%	5%	1,988	online	
Tennessee	Registered voters	Middle Tennessee State University	October 16–23, 2017	50%	40%	10%	600	telephone	
Virginia	Likely voters	Hampton University	October 18–22, 2017	39%	56%	5%	750	telephone	
Arkansas	All adults	University of Arkansas	October 12–22, 2017	47%	40%	14%	801	telephone	
United States	All adults	American Research Group	October 17–20, 2017	34%	61%	5%	1,100	telephone	
Wisconsin	Registered voters	Public Policy Polling	October 17–18, 2017	40%	52%	8%	1,116	telephone and online	
North Carolina	Registered voters	Civitas Institute	October 16–18, 2017	47%	50%	3%	600	telephone	
United States	Registered voters	Harvard University/The Harris Poll	October 14–18, 2017	42%	58%	---	2,159	online	
United States	All adults	Marist College	October 15–17, 2017	37%	55%	8%	1,093	telephone	
United States	All adults	SurveyMonkey (for NBC News)	October 13–17, 2017	40%	59%	2%	5,047	online	
United States	All adults	Ipsos (for Reuters)	October 13–17, 2017	38%	58%	4%	1,678	online	
Virginia	Likely voters	Quinnipiac University	October 12–17, 2017	35%	62%	2%	1,088	telephone	
Florida	Registered voters	University of North Florida	October 11–17, 2017	37%	59%	3%	834	telephone	
United States	All adults	YouGov (for The Economist)	October 15–16, 2017	37%	52%	10%	1,500	online	
United States	Registered voters	Morning Consult (for Politico)	October 12–16, 2017	44%	51%	5%	1,991	online	
Virginia	Likely voters	Monmouth University	October 12–16, 2017	38%	55%	6%	408	telephone	
United States	All adults	CNN	October 12–15, 2017	37%	57%	6%	1,010	telephone	
New Jersey	Likely voters	Fairleigh Dickinson University	October 11–15, 2017	31%	62%	5%	658	telephone	
Texas	Registered voters	University of Texas/The Texas Tribune/YouGov	October 6–15, 2017	45%	49%	6%	1,200	online	
New Hampshire	All adults	University of New Hampshire	October 3–15, 2017	33%	61%	6%	573	telephone	
Indiana	All adults	Old National Bank/Ball State University	October 2–15, 2017	41%	45%	---	600	telephone	
United States	Registered voters	Emerson College	October 12–14, 2017	44%	50%	6%	820	telephone	
United States	Likely voters	McLaughlin & Associates	October 10–14, 2017	47%	51%	2%	1,000	online	
Utah	Registered voters	The Salt Lake Tribune/Dan Jones & Associates	October 10–13, 2017	52%	46%	2%	605	telephone	
Virginia	Likely voters	Roanoke College	October 8–13, 2017	35%	58%	2%	607	telephone	
United States	All adults	Lucid	October 10–11, 2017	34%	52%	15%	1,323	online	
United States	All adults	SurveyMonkey	October 5–11, 2017	41%	57%	2%	16,203	online	
United States	All adults	YouGov (for The Economist)	October 7–10, 2017	36%	52%	12%	1,500	online	
United States	All adults	Ipsos (for Reuters)	October 6–10, 2017	36%	59%	5%	1,584	online	
United States	All adults	Kaiser Family Foundation	October 5–10, 2017	38%	58%	4%	1,215	telephone	
United States	Registered voters	Quinnipiac University	October 5–10, 2017	38%	56%	5%	1,482	telephone	
United States	Registered voters	Morning Consult (for Politico)	October 5–9, 2017	42%	53%	5%	1,996	online	
United States	All adults	Investor's Business Daily	September 29 – October 8, 2017	33%	61%	2%	887	telephone	
Minnesota	Registered voters	SurveyUSA/KSTP-TV	October 6–7, 2017	37%	53%	10%	473	telephone	
United States	Registered voters	Democracy Corps/Greenberg Research	September 30 – October 6, 2017	41%	55%	---	1,000	telephone	
North Carolina	All adults	High Point University#HPU Poll/High Point University	September 28 – October 6, 2017	35%	51%	14%	404	telephone	
United States	All adults	The Washington Post/University of Maryland	September 27 – October 5, 2017	37%	63%	1%	1,663	telephone and online	
United States	All adults	Lucid	October 3–4, 2017	36%	52%	12%	1,105	online	
United States	All adults	SurveyMonkey	September 29 – October 4, 2017	41%	57%	2%	15,120	online	
United States	All adults	YouGov (for The Economist)	October 1–3, 2017	39%	54%	8%	1,500	online	
United States	All adults	Ipsos (for Reuters)	September 29 – October 3, 2017	37%	58%	5%	1,659	online	
United States	All adults	Associated Press/NORC	September 28 – October 2, 2017	32%	67%	---	1,150	telephone and online	
Virginia	All adults	The Washington Post/Schar School of Policy and Government	September 28 – October 2, 2017	33%	59%	8%	1,121	telephone	
Alabama	Likely voters	JMC Analytics	September 30 – October 1, 2017	51%	41%	8%	500	telephone	
United States	Registered voters	Morning Consult (for Politico)	September 29 – October 1, 2017	45%	52%	3%	1,992	online	
New Jersey	Likely voters	Monmouth University	September 28 – October 1, 2017	33%	59%	8%	452	telephone	
North Carolina	Registered voters	Spectrum News/SurveyUSA	September 28 – October 1, 2017	37%	49%	14%	680	telephone	
United States	Registered voters	Suffolk University/USA Today	September 27 – October 1, 2017	38%	56%	6%	1,000	telephone	

majority approve plurality approve majority disapprove plurality disapprove

== September ==
Area polled	Segment polled	Polling group	Date	Approve	Disapprove	Unsure	Sample size	Polling method	Source(s)
West Virginia	Likely voters	Zogby Analytics	September 27–30, 2017	59%	36%	5%	320	online	
North Carolina	Registered voters	Elon University	September 25–29, 2017	34%	58%	8%	931	telephone	
United States	All adults	CNN	September 26–28, 2017	37%	56%	7%	1,037	telephone	
United States	All adults	SurveyMonkey	September 22–28, 2017	40%	57%	2%	16,638	online	
United States	All adults	PBS NewsHour/Marist College	September 25–27, 2017	37%	54%	9%	1,105	telephone	
United States	All adults	CNBC	September 24–27, 2017	38%	52%	10%	900	telephone	
United States	Registered voters	Fox News	September 24–26, 2017	42%	53%	5%	1,017	telephone	
United States	All adults	YouGov (for The Economist)	September 24–26, 2017	37%	53%	10%	1,500	online	
United States	All adults	Ipsos (for Reuters)	September 22–26, 2017	38%	57%	6%	3,429	online	
United States	Registered voters	Quinnipiac University	September 21–26, 2017	36%	57%	6%	1,412	telephone	
United States	Registered voters	Public Policy Polling	September 22–25, 2017	42%	53%	5%	865	telephone and online	
Virginia	Likely voters	Monmouth University	September 21–25, 2017	40%	55%	6%	499	telephone	
United States	Registered voters	Morning Consult (for Politico)	September 22–24, 2017	43%	54%	3%	1,987	online	
United States	All adults	CBS News	September 21–24, 2017	35%	55%	10%	1,202	telephone	
Florida	Likely voters	Florida Chamber of Commerce	September 17–24, 2017	48%	50%	2%	615	telephone	
Virginia	Registered voters	Public Policy Polling (for Equality Virginia)	September 21–23, 2017	42%	53%	5%	849	telephone and online	
New Jersey	Likely voters	Suffolk University/USA Today Network	September 19–23, 2017	35%	56%	9%	500	telephone	
Virginia	Likely voters	Roanoke College	September 16–23, 2017	36%	56%	1%	596	telephone	
United States	Registered voters	Public Policy Polling (for Save My Care)	September 20–21, 2017	42%	54%	4%	638	telephone and online	
United States	All adults	ABC News/The Washington Post	September 18–21, 2017	39%	57%	4%	1,002	telephone	
United States	All adults	SurveyMonkey	September 15–21, 2017	45%	53%	2%	9,061	online	
United States	Registered voters	Harvard University/The Harris Poll	September 17–20, 2017	45%	55%	---	2,177	online	
United States	All adults	CNN	September 17–20, 2017	40%	55%	5%	1,053	telephone	
United States	All adults	American Research Group	September 17–20, 2017	35%	59%	6%	1,100	telephone	
New Jersey	Registered voters	Fox News	September 17–19, 2017	40%	54%	6%	804	telephone	
United States	All adults	YouGov (for The Economist)	September 17–19, 2017	39%	49%	12%	1,500	online	
United States	All adults	Ipsos (for Reuters)	September 15–19, 2017	39%	55%	6%	1,557	online	
United States	All adults	Monmouth University	September 15–19, 2017	40%	49%	11%	1,009	telephone	
California	All adults	Public Policy Institute of California	September 10–19, 2017	27%	69%	4%	1,721	telephone	
Virginia	Registered voters	Fox News	September 17–18, 2017	42%	53%	5%	507	telephone	
United States	All adults	NBC News/The Wall Street Journal	September 14–18, 2017	43%	52%	5%	900	telephone	
Virginia	Likely voters	Quinnipiac University	September 14–18, 2017	39%	58%	3%	850	telephone	
United States	All adults	Kaiser Family Foundation	September 13–18, 2017	38%	57%	4%	1,179	telephone	
United States	Registered voters	Morning Consult (for Politico)	September 14–17, 2017	43%	52%	5%	1,994	online	
New York City	Registered voters	NBC 4 New York/Marist College	September 13–17, 2017	21%	72%	7%	898	telephone	
Virginia	Likely voters	Suffolk University/USA Today	September 13–17, 2017	42%	51%	6%	500	telephone	
United States	All adults	Saint Leo University	September 10–16, 2017	43%	53%	4%	1,000	online	
United States	All adults	Morning Consult (for the Bloomberg Global Business Forum)	September 12–14, 2017	41%	51%	8%	2,094	online	
United States	All adults	YouGov (for HuffPost)	September 12–14, 2017	40%	51%	10%	1,000	online	
United States	All adults	SurveyMonkey	September 8–14, 2017	42%	55%	3%	16,343	online	
Minnesota	All adults	Minnesota Public Radio	August 22 – September 14, 2017	36%	58%	4%	1,654	telephone	
United States	All adults	Marist College	September 11–13, 2017	39%	50%	12%	1,224	telephone	
United States	All adults	YouGov (for The Economist)	September 10–12, 2017	39%	52%	8%	1,500	online	
United States	All adults	Ipsos (for Reuters)	September 8–12, 2017	35%	59%	7%	1,669	online	
New Jersey	Registered voters	Quinnipiac University	September 7–12, 2017	32%	61%	7%	1,121	telephone	
Virginia	All adults	University of Mary Washington	September 5–12, 2017	37%	55%	8%	1,000	telephone	
United States	Registered voters	Morning Consult (for Politico)	September 7–11, 2017	42%	51%	8%	1,976	online	
Alabama	Likely voters	Emerson College	September 8–9, 2017	52%	36%	4%	416	telephone	
United States	Likely voters	Zogby Analytics	September 7–9, 2017	43%	53%	4%	834	online	
United States	All adults	SurveyMonkey	September 1–7, 2017	40%	57%	3%	13,443	online	
United States	All adults	YouGov (for The Economist)	September 3–5, 2017	41%	52%	8%	1,500	online	
United States	All adults	Ipsos (for Reuters)	September 1–5, 2017	40%	57%	4%	1,672	online	
United States	Registered voters	Morning Consult (for Politico)	August 31 – September 3, 2017	43%	52%	5%	1,993	online	

majority approve plurality approve majority disapprove plurality disapprove

== August ==
Area polled	Segment polled	Polling group	Date	Approve	Disapprove	Unsure	Sample size	Polling method	Source(s)
United States	All adults	SurveyMonkey	August 25–31, 2017	40%	59%	2%	12,032	online	
United States	All adults	Investor's Business Daily	August 23–31, 2017	38%	57%	2%	905	telephone	
United States	Registered voters	Fox News	August 27–29, 2017	41%	55%	4%	1,006	telephone	
United States	All adults	YouGov (for The Economist)	August 27–29, 2017	38%	53%	10%	1,500	online	
United States	All adults	SurveyMonkey (for NBC News)	August 24–29, 2017	39%	59%	2%	10,129	online	
United States	Registered voters	Morning Consult (for Politico)	August 24–28, 2017	40%	55%	5%	1,999	online	
United States	Likely voters	McLaughlin & Associates	August 24–28, 2017	48%	50%	2%	1,000	online	
Florida	Registered voters	Florida Atlantic University	August 24–26, 2017	37%	47%	16%	800	telephone and online	
United States	All adults	YouGov (for HuffPost)	August 22–23, 2017	36%	54%	10%	1,000	online	
United States	All adults	Ipsos (for Reuters)	August 18–22, 2017	36%	59%	5%	2,744	online	
United States	Registered voters	Quinnipiac University	August 17–22, 2017	35%	59%	6%	1,514	telephone	
United States	Registered voters	Harvard University/The Harris Poll	August 17–22, 2017	43%	57%	---	2,263	online	
United States	Registered voters	Public Policy Polling	August 18–21, 2017	40%	53%	7%	887	telephone and online	
United States	All adults	Associated Press/NORC	August 17–21, 2017	36%	63%	---	1,038	telephone and online	
United States	All adults	Pew Research Center	August 8–21, 2017	36%	63%	1%	4,971	telephone	
United States	All adults	American Research Group	August 17–20, 2017	33%	62%	5%	1,100	telephone	
United States	All adults	ABC News/The Washington Post	August 16–20, 2017	37%	58%	5%	1,014	telephone	
West Virginia	Likely voters	West Virginia MetroNews	August 11–20, 2017	48%	39%	13%	400	telephone and online	
United States	All adults	YouGov (for HuffPost)	August 18–19, 2017	34%	57%	8%	1,000	online	
United States	Registered voters	Morning Consult (for Politico)	August 17–19, 2017	39%	56%	5%	1,987	online	
Virginia	Likely voters	Roanoke College	August 12–19, 2017	28%	57%	2%	599	telephone	
United States	Registered voters	GW Battleground	August 13–17, 2017	42%	53%	4%	1,000	telephone	
Michigan	All adults	NBC News/Marist	August 13–17, 2017	36%	55%	10%	907	telephone	
Kentucky	Registered voters	Public Policy Polling	August 15–16, 2017	60%	36%	4%	645	telephone and online	
United States	All adults	NPR/PBS NewsHour/Marist	August 14–15, 2017	35%	51%	14%	1,125	telephone	
United States	Registered voters	Quinnipiac University	August 9–15, 2017	39%	57%	4%	1,361	telephone	
United States	Registered voters	Morning Consult (for Politico)	August 10–14, 2017	44%	52%	5%	1,997	online	
United States	All adults	Monmouth University	August 10–14, 2017	41%	49%	10%	805	telephone	
United States	All adults	Marist College	August 8–12, 2017	35%	55%	9%	1,009	telephone	
United States	Registered voters	Public Policy Polling (for VoteVets.org)	August 9–10, 2017	40%	53%	---	948	telephone and online	
United States	All adults	NBC News/The Wall Street Journal	August 5–9, 2017	40%	55%	5%	1,200	telephone	
United States	All adults	YouGov (for The Economist)	August 6–8, 2017	37%	53%	11%	1,500	online	
New Hampshire	All adults	University of New Hampshire	July 29 – August 8, 2017	34%	55%	11%	502	telephone	
United States	All adults	CBS News	August 3–6, 2017	36%	58%	6%	1,111	telephone	
United States	All adults	CNN	August 3–6, 2017	38%	56%	5%	1,018	telephone	
United States	Registered voters	Morning Consult (for Politico)	August 3–6, 2017	40%	55%	5%	1,992	online	
United States	All adults	Kaiser Family Foundation	August 1–6, 2017	36%	61%	3%	1,211	telephone	
United States	All adults	Investor's Business Daily	July 28 – August 5, 2017	32%	59%	2%	904	telephone	
United States	All adults	Ipsos (for Reuters)	July 28 – August 1, 2017	37%	59%	4%	3,130	online	
United States	Registered voters	Quinnipiac University	July 27 – August 1, 2017	33%	61%	5%	1,125	telephone	

majority approve plurality approve majority disapprove plurality disapprove

== July ==
Area polled	Segment polled	Polling group	Date	Approve	Disapprove	Unsure	Sample size	Polling method	Source(s)
United States	All adults	Ipsos (for Reuters)	July 21–25, 2017	35%	59%	6%	1,532	online	
Virginia	Likely voters	Monmouth University	July 20–23, 2017	37%	57%	6%	502	telephone	
United States	All adults	American Research Group	July 17–20, 2017	35%	57%	8%	1,100	telephone	
United States	All adults	USA Today/iMediaEthics/SurveyUSA	July 17–19, 2017	44%	51%	5%	1,250	online	
United States	Registered voters	Fox News	July 16–18, 2017	41%	53%	6%	1,020	telephone	
New Jersey	All adults	NBC 4 New York/Marist College	July 13–18, 2017	33%	60%	7%	895	telephone	
California	All adults	Public Policy Institute of California	July 9–18, 2017	25%	71%	4%	1,696	telephone	
United States	Registered voters	Public Policy Polling	July 14–17, 2017	41%	55%	4%	836	telephone and online	
United States	All adults	YouGov (for HuffPost)	July 15–16, 2017	40%	50%	10%	1,000	online	
United States	All adults	Monmouth University	July 13–16, 2017	39%	52%	9%	800	telephone	
United States	All adults	ABC News/The Washington Post	July 10–13, 2017	36%	58%	6%	1,001	telephone	
Iowa	All adults	The Des Moines Register/Mediacom	July 9–13, 2017	43%	52%	5%	800	telephone	
United States	All adults	Bloomberg News	July 8–12, 2017	40%	56%	4%	1,001	telephone	
United States	All adults	YouGov (for The Economist)	July 9–11, 2017	37%	52%	11%	1,500	online	
United States	All adults	Kaiser Family Foundation	July 5–10, 2017	38%	57%	3%	1,183	telephone	
United States	Registered voters	Morning Consult (for Politico)	July 7–9, 2017	46%	50%	4%	1,983	online	
New Jersey	All adults	Monmouth University	July 7–9, 2017	35%	58%	6%	800	telephone	

majority approve plurality approve majority disapprove plurality disapprove

== June ==
Area polled	Segment polled	Polling group	Date	Approve	Disapprove	Unsure	Sample size	Polling method	Source(s)
United States	All adults	YouGov (for HuffPost)	June 29–30, 2017	38%	52%	11%	1,000	online	
United States	All adults	Investor's Business Daily/TIPP	June 23–29, 2017	37%	58%	1%	900	telephone	
United States	Registered voters	Fox News	June 25–27, 2017	44%	50%	6%	1,017	telephone	
United States	Registered voters	Suffolk University/USA Today	June 24–27, 2017	42%	53%	6%	1,000	telephone	
United States	All adults	Ipsos (for Reuters)	June 23–27, 2017	35%	58%	7%	1,620	online	
United States	Registered voters	Quinnipiac University	June 22–27, 2017	40%	55%	5%	1,212	telephone	
Wisconsin	Registered voters	Marquette University Law School	June 22–25, 2017	41%	51%	7%	800	telephone	
United States	All adults	NPR/PBS NewsHour/Marist College	June 21–25, 2017	37%	51%	12%	1,205	telephone	
United States	All adults	NBC News/The Wall Street Journal	June 17–20, 2017	40%	55%	5%	900	telephone	
United States	All adults	American Research Group	June 17–20, 2017	37%	59%	4%	1,100	telephone	
United States	All adults	Ipsos (for Reuters)	June 16–20, 2017	38%	59%	4%	1,544	online	
Virginia	Registered voters	Quinnipiac University	June 15–20, 2017	40%	57%	2%	1,145	telephone	
United States	All adults	Kaiser Family Foundation	June 14–19, 2017	40%	56%	3%	1,208	telephone	
United States	All adults	CBS News	June 15–18, 2017	36%	57%	7%	1,117	telephone	
United States	All adults	Pew Research Center	June 8–18, 2017	39%	55%	7%	2,504	telephone	
United States	All adults	CNBC	June 9–12, 2017	37%	51%	12%	800	telephone	
United States	Registered voters	Morning Consult (for Politico)	June 8–12, 2017	45%	50%	5%	1,990	online	
United States	Registered voters	Public Policy Polling	June 9–11, 2017	41%	52%	7%	811	telephone and online	
United States	All adults	Associated Press/NORC	June 8–11, 2017	35%	64%	1%	1,068	telephone and online	
Texas	Registered voters	University of Texas/The Texas Tribune/YouGov	June 2–11, 2017	43%	51%	---	1,200	online	
United States	All adults	YouGov (for The Economist)	June 4–6, 2017	38%	54%	9%	1,500	online	
United States	All adults	Ipsos (for Reuters)	June 2–6, 2017	38%	58%	4%	2,371	online	
United States	Registered voters	Quinnipiac University	31 May – June 6, 2017	34%	57%	9%	1,361	telephone	
United States	All adults	Investor's Business Daily/TIPP	30 May – June 6, 2017	37%	55%	1%	903	telephone	

majority approve plurality approve majority disapprove plurality disapprove

== May ==
Area polled	Segment polled	Polling group	Date	Approve	Disapprove	Unsure	Sample size	Polling method	Source(s)
United States	All adults	Ipsos (for Reuters)	May 26–30, 2017	40%	55%	6%	2,081	online	
United States	Registered voters	Fox News	May 21–23, 2017	40%	53%	7%	1,011	telephone	
United States	All adults	YouGov (for The Economist)	May 20–23, 2017	39%	51%	11%	1,500	online	
United States	Registered voters	Quinnipiac University	May 17–23, 2017	37%	55%	7%	1,404	telephone	
United States	All adults	Kaiser Family Foundation/PSRAI	May 16–22, 2017	37%	58%	3%	1,205	telephone	
California	All adults	Public Policy Institute of California	May 12–22, 2017	27%	67%	6%	1,690	telephone	
United States	All adults	American Research Group	May 17–20, 2017	39%	56%	5%	1,100	telephone	
United States	All adults	Ipsos (for Reuters)	May 14–18, 2017	38%	56%	6%	1,971	online	
United States	All adults	Monmouth University	May 13–17, 2017	39%	53%	8%	1,002	telephone	
New York City	Registered voters	Quinnipiac University	May 10–16, 2017	22%	74%	4%	1,019	telephone	
New Hampshire	All adults	University of New Hampshire	May 5–15, 2017	34%	56%	9%	500	telephone	
Tennessee	Registered voters	Vanderbilt University/PSRAI	May 4–15, 2017	52%	42%	3%	1,004	telephone	
United States	Registered voters	Public Policy Polling	May 12–14, 2017	40%	54%	6%	692	telephone and online	
United States	Registered voters	Morning Consult (for Politico)	May 12–14, 2017	43%	51%	8%	2,001	online	
Virginia	All adults	The Washington Post/Schar School of Policy and Government	May 9–14, 2017	36%	59%	5%	1,602	telephone	
United States	All adults	NBC News/The Wall Street Journal	May 11–13, 2017	39%	54%	7%	800	telephone	
United States	All adults	YouGov (for The Economist)	May 6–9, 2017	41%	51%	8%	1,500	online	
United States	Registered voters	Quinnipiac University	May 4–9, 2017	36%	58%	6%	1,078	telephone	
United States	Registered voters	Morning Consult (for Politico)	May 4–6, 2017	44%	48%	7%	1,996	online	
United States	All adults	Investor's Business Daily/TIPP	April 28 – May 4, 2017	39%	54%	1%	904	telephone	
New Hampshire	All adults	University of New Hampshire	April 24 – May 4, 2017	43%	47%	9%	518	telephone	
United States	All adults	YouGov (for The Economist)	April 29 – May 2, 2017	43%	47%	11%	1,500	online	
United States	All adults	Ipsos (for Reuters)	April 28 – May 2, 2017	44%	51%	5%	2,214	online	
New Jersey	Registered voters	Quinnipiac University	April 26 – May 1, 2017	35%	56%	9%	1,209	telephone	
United States	All adults	Kaiser Family Foundation/The Washington Post	April 13 – May 1, 2017	43%	51%	5%	1,686	telephone	

majority approve plurality approve majority disapprove plurality disapprove

== April ==
Area polled	Segment polled	Polling group	Date	Approve	Disapprove	Unsure	Sample size	Polling method	Source(s)
United States	Registered voters	Morning Consult (for Politico)	April 27–30, 2017	48%	45%	7%	1,998	online	
Minnesota	Registered voters	Star Tribune	April 24–26, 2017	40%	51%	9%	800	telephone	
United States	Registered voters	Fox News	April 23–25, 2017	45%	48%	7%	1,009	telephone	
United States	All adults	CNN	April 22–25, 2017	44%	54%	2%	1,009	telephone	
United States	All adults	CBS News	April 21–24, 2017	41%	53%	6%	1,214	telephone	
United States	All adults	Kaiser Family Foundation	April 17–23, 2017	45%	50%	3%	1,171	telephone	
United States	All adults	NBC News/The Wall Street Journal	April 17–20, 2017	40%	54%	6%	900	telephone	
United States	All adults	ABC News/The Washington Post	April 17–20, 2017	42%	53%	5%	1,004	telephone	
United States	All adults	American Research Group	April 17–20, 2017	39%	56%	5%	1,100	telephone	
United States	Registered voters	Public Policy Polling	April 17–18, 2017	43%	50%	7%	648	telephone and online	
United States	All adults	YouGov (for The Huffington Post)	April 17–18, 2017	41%	48%	11%	1,000	online	
United States	Registered voters	Quinnipiac University	April 12–18, 2017	40%	56%	4%	1,062	telephone	
United States	All adults	Ipsos (for Reuters)	April 13–17, 2017	43%	52%	4%	1,843	online	
United States	Registered voters	Marist College	April 11–12, 2017	39%	49%	12%	869	telephone	
United States	All adults	Pew Research Center	April 5–11, 2017	39%	54%	6%	1,501	telephone	
United States	All adults	CBS News	April 7–9, 2017	43%	49%	8%	1,006	telephone	
United States	Registered voters	Morning Consult (for Politico)	April 6–9, 2017	48%	47%	5%	1,988	online	
United States	All adults	Gallup	April 4–6, 2017	40%	54%	---	1,500	telephone	
Texas	All adults	Texas Lyceum	April 3–9, 2017	42%	54%	2%	1,000	telephone	
United States	All adults	CNBC	April 3–6, 2017	39%	48%	13%	804	telephone	
United States	All adults	YouGov (for The Economist)	April 2–4, 2017	40%	48%	11%	1,500	online	
United States	All adults	Ipsos (for Reuters)	March 31 – April 4, 2017	46%	50%	4%	2,149	online	
United States	Registered voters	Quinnipiac University	March 30 – April 3, 2017	35%	57%	8%	1,171	telephone	
United States	All adults	Kaiser Family Foundation/Princeton Survey Research Associates International	March 28 – April 3, 2017	41%	55%	3%	1,203	telephone	

majority approve plurality approve majority disapprove plurality disapprove

== March ==
Area polled	Segment polled	Polling group	Date	Approve	Disapprove	Unsure	Sample size	Polling method	Source
North Carolina	All adults	High Point University#HPU Poll/High Point University	March 25–30, 2017	36%	54%	10%	416	telephone	
United States	All adults	Investor's Business Daily	March 24–30, 2017	34%	56%	1%	904	telephone	
United States	Registered voters	Public Policy Polling	March 27–28, 2017	40%	53%	7%	677	telephone and online	
United States	All adults	Gallup	March 26–28, 2017	35%	59%	---	1,500	telephone	
United States	All adults	CBS News	March 25–28, 2017	40%	52%	7%	1,088	telephone	
United States	All adults	Ipsos (for Reuters)	March 24–28, 2017	44%	49%	7%	1,646	online	
United States	All adults	SurveyMonkey (for NBC News)	March 24–28, 2017	42%	56%	1%	7,832	online	
United States	All adults	Associated Press/NORC	March 23–27, 2017	42%	58%	---	1,110	telephone and online	
United States	Registered voters	McClatchy/Marist College	March 22–27, 2017	38%	51%	11%	906	telephone	
New Jersey	All adults	Fairleigh Dickinson University	March 22–26, 2017	28%	61%	9%	816	telephone	
United States	Likely voters	Rasmussen Reports	March 22–26, 2017	45%	54%	---	1,500	telephone and online	
United States	All adults	SurveyMonkey	March 17–23, 2017	42%	56%	2%	12,306	online	
New Hampshire	All adults	American Research Group	March 19–22, 2017	31%	61%	8%	600	telephone	
United States	Registered voters	Quinnipiac University	March 16–21, 2017	37%	56%	7%	1,056	telephone	
Utah	Registered voters	The Salt Lake Tribune/Hinckley Institute of Politics	March 15–21, 2017	54%	41%	5%	605	telephone	
United States	All adults	American Research Group	March 17–20, 2017	41%	54%	5%	1,100	telephone	
United States	Registered voters	Morning Consult (for Politico)	March 16–19, 2017	50%	44%	6%	1,927	online	
United States	Likely voters	Rasmussen Reports	March 15–19, 2017	49%	51%	---	1,500	telephone and online	
United States	All adults	Gallup	March 16–18, 2017	37%	58%	---	1,500	telephone	
United States	All adults	YouGov (for The Economist)	March 13–14, 2017	41%	49%	11%	1,500	online	
United States	Registered voters	Fox News	March 12–14, 2017	43%	51%	6%	1,008	telephone	
United States	All adults	Ipsos (for Reuters)	March 10–14, 2017	45%	49%	6%	1,750	online	
United States	Likely voters	Rasmussen Reports	March 10–14, 2017	46%	53%	---	1,500	telephone and online	
California	All adults	Public Policy Institute of California	March 5–14, 2017	31%	61%	7%	1,685	telephone and online	
United States	All adults	Gallup	March 11–13, 2017	39%	55%	---	1,500	telephone and online	
United States	Registered voters	Public Policy Polling	March 10–12, 2017	43%	50%	7%	808	telephone and online	
United States	All adults	Kaiser Family Foundation/Princeton Survey Research Associates International	March 6–12, 2017	36%	58%	3%	1,206	telephone	
United States	All adults	SurveyMonkey	March 3–9, 2017	47%	52%	2%	12,257	online	
United States	All adults	YouGov (for The Economist)	March 6–7, 2017	42%	49%	9%	1,500	online	
United States	Likely voters	Rasmussen Reports	March 5–7, 2017	49%	51%	---	1,500	telephone and online	
United States	All adults	Ipsos (for Reuters)	March 3–7, 2017	48%	46%	6%	1,662	online	
United States	All adults	Gallup	March 4–6, 2017	43%	51%	---	1,500	telephone	
United States	Registered voters	Quinnipiac University	March 2–6, 2017	41%	52%	7%	1,283	telephone	
United States	Registered voters	Morning Consult (for Politico)	March 2–6, 2017	50%	45%	6%	1,992	online	
United States	All adults	Monmouth University	March 2–5, 2017	43%	46%	11%	801	telephone	
United States	Registered voters	Suffolk University/USA Today	March 1–5, 2017	47%	44%	9%	1,000	telephone	
United States	All adults	SurveyMonkey	March 1–5, 2017	48%	51%	1%	4,551	online	
United States	Likely voters	Rasmussen Reports	March 1–5, 2017	52%	48%	---	1,500	telephone and online	
United States	All adults	CNN/ORC	March 1–4, 2017	45%	52%	3%	1,025	telephone	
United States	All adults	Investor's Business Daily	February 24 – March 4, 2017	41%	53%	1%	909	telephone	
United States	All adults	SurveyMonkey	February 24 – March 2, 2017	45%	53%	2%	12,273	online	
United States	Likely voters	Rasmussen Reports	February 27 – March 1, 2017	52%	48%	---	1,500	telephone and online	
United States	All adults	YouGov (for The Economist)	February 25 – March 1, 2017	41%	50%	9%	1,500	online	

majority approve plurality approve majority disapprove plurality disapprove

== February ==
Area polled	Segment polled	Polling group	Date	Approve	Disapprove	Unsure	Sample size	Polling method	Source
United States	All adults	Ipsos (for Reuters)	February 24–28, 2017	46%	48%	6%	1,847	online	
United States	Registered voters	Morning Consult (for Politico)	February 24–26, 2017	50%	45%	5%	2,000	online	
United States	Likely voters	Rasmussen Reports	February 23–26, 2017	51%	49%	---	1,500	telephone and online	
United States	All adults	SurveyMonkey	February 17–23, 2017	44%	54%	2%	10,639	online	
United States	Registered voters	Public Policy Polling	February 21–22, 2017	45%	48%	7%	941	telephone and online	
United States	All adults	NBC News/Wall Street Journal	February 18–22, 2017	44%	48%	8%	1,000	telephone	
United States	All adults	YouGov (for The Economist)	February 18–22, 2017	43%	46%	11%	1,500	online	
United States	All adults	CBS News	February 17–21, 2017	39%	51%	10%	1,280	telephone	
United States	All adults	Ipsos (for Reuters)	February 17–21, 2017	45%	50%	5%	2,338	online	
United States	Registered voters	Quinnipiac University	February 16–21, 2017	38%	55%	7%	1,323	telephone	
United States	All adults	American Research Group	February 17–20, 2017	43%	51%	6%	1,100	telephone	
United States	Registered voters	Morning Consult (for Politico)	February 16–19, 2017	49%	44%	7%	2,013	online	
United States	Registered voters	McClatchy/Marist College	February 15–19, 2017	41%	49%	9%	865	telephone	
United States	All adults	SurveyMonkey (for NBC News)	February 13–19, 2017	43%	54%	2%	11,512	online	
United States	All adults	YouGov (for The Huffington Post)	February 17–18, 2017	41%	47%	12%	1,000	online	
United States	All adults	Gallup	February 16–18, 2017	41%	55%	---	1,500	telephone	
United States	All adults	SurveyMonkey	February 13–17, 2017	46%	53%	2%	9,163	online	
United States	Likely voters	Rasmussen Reports	February 15, 2017	53%	47%	---	1,500	telephone and online	
Virginia	Registered voters	Quinnipiac University	February 10–15, 2017	38%	56%	6%	989	telephone	
United States	All adults	YouGov for The Economist	February 12–14, 2017	43%	47%	10%	1,500	online	
United States	All adults	Ipsos/Reuters	February 10–14, 2017	46%	50%	4%	1,774	online	
United States	All adults	Pew Research Center	February 7–12, 2017	39%	56%	6%	1,503	N/A	
United States	All adults	Gallup	February 8–11, 2017	40%	55%	5%	1,500	telephone	
United States	Likely voters	Rasmussen Reports	February 10, 2017	52%	48%	---	1,500	telephone and online	
United States	Registered voters	Morning Consult/Politico	February 9–10, 2017	49%	45%	6%	1,791	online	
United States	Likely voters	Rasmussen Reports	February 9, 2017	53%	47%	---	1,500	telephone and online	
Iowa	All adults	The Des Moines Register/Selzer & Co.	February 6–9, 2017	42%	49%	9%	802	telephone	
United States	Registered voters	Public Policy Polling	February 7–8, 2017	43%	53%	3%	712	telephone	
United States	Registered voters	Emerson College	February 5–6, 2017	48%	47%	5%	617	telephone	
United States	Likely voters	Rasmussen Reports	February 6, 2017	53%	47%	---	1,500	telephone and online	
United States	All adults	Gallup	February 3–6, 2017	42%	53%	5%	1,500	telephone	
United States	Registered voters	Morning Consult/Politico	February 2–4, 2017	47%	46%	7%	2,070	online	
United States	All adults	CBS News	February 1–2, 2017	40%	48%	12%	1,019	telephone	
United States	All adults	CNN	January 31 – February 2, 2017	44%	53%	3%	1,002	N/A	
United States	All adults	Investor's Business Daily	January 27 – February 2, 2017	42%	48%	10%	885	telephone	

majority approve plurality approve majority disapprove plurality disapprove

== January (post-inauguration) ==
Area polled	Segment polled	Polling group	Date	Approve	Disapprove	Unsure	Sample size	Polling method	Source
United States	Registered voters	Public Policy Polling	January 30–31, 2017	47%	49%	4%	750	telephone and online	
United States	Likely voters	Rasmussen Reports	January 30, 2017	53%	47%	---	1,500	telephone and online	
Milwaukee County	Registered voters	Public Policy Polling	January 27–29, 2017	30%	63%	7%	1,260	telephone	
New Jersey	All adults	Fairleigh Dickinson University	January 25–29, 2017	37%	50%	11%	921	telephone	
United States	Likely voters	Rasmussen Reports	January 27, 2017	55%	45%	---	1,500	telephone and online	
United States	Likely voters	Rasmussen Reports	January 26, 2017	59%	41%	---	1,500	telephone and online	
(Russia) Russian Federation	N/A	VTsIOM	January 26, 2017	71%	N/A	N/A	1,800	N/A	
United States	Likely voters	Rasmussen Reports	January 25, 2017	57%	43%	---	1,500	telephone and online	
United States	All adults	Gallup	January 24–26, 2017	45%	48%	7%	1,500	telephone	
United States	All adults	YouGov (for The Economist)	January 23–25, 2017	43%	39%	18%	2,692	online	
United States	All adults	Quinnipiac University	January 20–25, 2017	36%	44%	19%	1,190	telephone	
United States	Registered voters	Public Policy Polling	January 23–24, 2017	44%	44%	12%	1,043	telephone and online	
United States	All adults	Gallup	January 22–25, 2017	46%	45%	9%	1,500	telephone	
United States	All adults	Ipsos (for Reuters)	January 20–24, 2017	43%	45%	12%	1,282	online	
United States	All adults	Gallup	January 20–22, 2017	45%	45%	10%	1,525	telephone	
United States	Registered voters	Morning Consult (for Politico)	January 20–22, 2017	46%	37%	17%	1,992	telephone	

majority approve plurality approve majority disapprove plurality disapprove

== January (pre-inauguration) ==
Area polled	Segment polled	Polling group	Date	Approve	Disapprove	Unsure	Sample size	Polling method	Source
United States	All adults	CBS News	January 13–16, 2017	37%	48%	15%	1,257	telephone	
United States	All adults	CNN	January 12–15, 2017	40%	52%	8%	1,000	telephone	
United States	All adults	ABC News / The Washington Post	January 12–15, 2017	40%	54%	6%	1,005	telephone	
United States	All adults	NBC News / The Wall Street Journal	January 12–15, 2017	44%	52%	4%	500	telephone	
United States	Registered voters	Quinnipiac University	January 5–9, 2017	37%	51%	12%	899	telephone	
United States	All adults	Gallup	January 4–8, 2017	44%	51%	5%	1,032	telephone	

majority approve plurality approve majority disapprove plurality disapprove
