= Geoffrey Edge =

English cricketer

Personal information
- Full name: Geoffrey Broadbent Edge
- Born: 17 August 1911; Wimbledon, Surrey, England
- Died: 31 May 1996 (aged 84); Stockport, Cheshire, England
- Batting: Left-handed
- Role: Wicket-keeper

Domestic team information
- Years: Team
- 1942/43: Europeans (India)
- 1937–1939: Warwickshire

Career statistics
Competition	First-class
Matches	1
Runs scored	35
Batting average	17.50
100s/50s	–/–
Top score	31
Balls bowled	–
Wickets	–
Bowling average	–
5 wickets in innings	–
10 wickets in match	–
Best bowling	–
Catches/stumpings	2/1
- Source: ESPNcricinfo, 29 April 2012

Geoffrey Broadbent Edge (17 August 1911 – 31 May 1996) was an English cricketer. Edge was a left-handed batsman who fielded as a wicket-keeper. He was born at Wimbledon, Surrey.

Edge made his debut in county cricket for Staffordshire against Northumberland in the 1937 Minor Counties Championship. He played Minor counties cricket for Staffordshire in 1937 and 1939, making a total of seven appearances, the last of which came against Durham. While in the British Raj during World War II, Edge made a single first-class appearance for the Europeans against the Indians in the 1942/43 Madras Presidency Match. The Indians won the toss and elected to bat first, making 268 all out. In their first-innings, the Europeans made 242 all out, with Edge, who opened the batting, making 4 runs before being dismissed by C. R. Rangachari. In their second-innings, the Indians were dismissed for 117, leaving the Europeans to chase 144 to win. Once again opening the batting, Edge shared in a 51 run opening stand for the first wicket with C. P. Johnstone, before Edge was dismissed for 31 by T. S. Parankusam. The Europeans went on to win the match by 8 wickets.

He died at Stockport, Cheshire, on 31 May 1996.
