= Tommy Edge =

English footballer

Personal information
- Full name: Thomas Edge
- Date of birth: 28 April 1898
- Date of death: 1966 (aged 67–68)
- Position: Outside right

Thomas Edge (28 April 1898 – 1966) was a professional footballer. An outside right, he played in the Football League for Manchester City, Oldham Athletic, Exeter City, Blackpool and New Brighton. He also played for Brook Valley, Treherbert, Winsford United, Stockport Wednesday and Stockport Thursday.
