= Daniel Ragsdale =

American government official

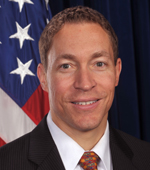

Acting Director of U.S. Immigration and Customs Enforcement
- In office January 20, 2017 – January 30, 2017
- President: Donald Trump
- Preceded by: Sarah Saldaña
- Succeeded by: Tom Homan (acting)

Deputy Director of Immigration and Customs Enforcement
- In office May 2012 – May 2017
- President: Barack Obama; Donald Trump
- Preceded by: Kumar C. Kibble
- Succeeded by: Ronald Vitiello

Personal details
- Education: Franklin and Marshall College (BA); Fordham University (JD)

Daniel H. Ragsdale is an American lawyer and law enforcement official. From May 2012 through May 2017 he was deputy director of U.S. Immigration and Customs Enforcement (ICE). He was named Acting Director of ICE on January 20, 2017, but was dismissed from that position on January 30, 2017 shortly after the dismissal of Sally Yates by President Donald Trump, retaining his post as deputy director. He is currently employed by GEO Group, a private-prison company.

== Education ==
Ragsdale is a graduate of Franklin and Marshall College and holds a Juris Doctor from Fordham University School of Law.

== Career ==
Ragsdale joined the U.S. Immigration and Naturalization Service (now U.S. Immigration and Customs Enforcement) in 1996, where he worked for the General Counsel's Office. He later became chief management officer of ICE, then chief of the Enforcement Law Division. Ragsdale became a deputy director of ICE in 2012. In 2013, his office worked to prosecute a smuggling ring which had been mislabeling the country-of-origin of honey, to skirt anti-dumping laws. In 2014 as deputy director of ICE he participated in a high-profile bust of an online child pornography ring.

He became acting director of ICE on January 20, 2017, following the inauguration of Donald Trump as president. Trump replaced Ragsdale with Tom Homan on January 30, 2017, shortly after he fired Acting United States Attorney General Sally Yates. No explanation was given for the personnel change. Ragsdale retained his position of deputy director. The demotion of Ragsdale together with the firing of Yates has been referred to as the Monday Night Massacre.

In May 2017 he resigned from ICE to take a position with GEO Group, the second-largest private prison company in the country.

Government offices
Preceded by Kumar C. Kibble	Deputy Director of the U.S. Immigration and Customs Enforcement; 2012–2017	Succeeded by Ronald Vitiello
Preceded by Sarah Saldaña	Director of the U.S. Immigration and Customs Enforcement; Acting; 2017	Succeeded by Tom Homan; Acting
