= Charles Edge (computer scientist) =

American computer scientist and author (died 2024)

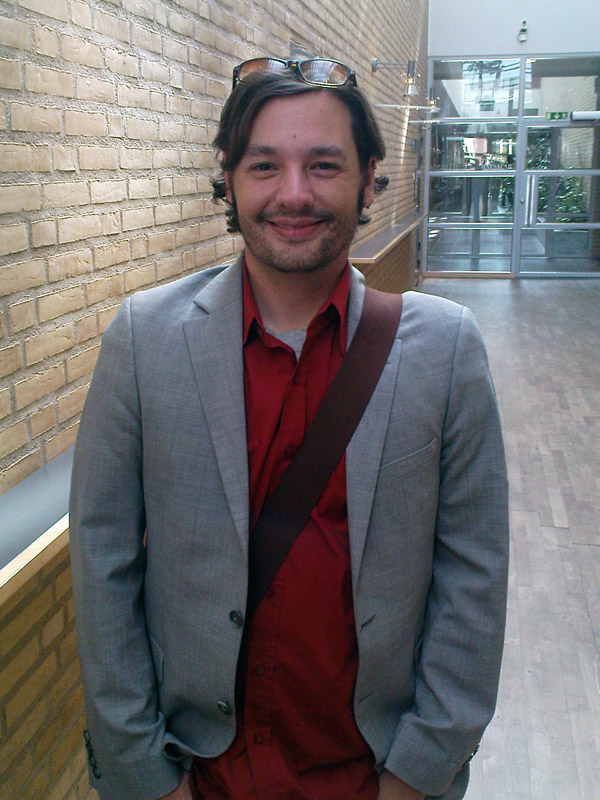
- Edge on September 18, 2009
- Born: Dahlonega, Georgia
- Died: April 19, 2024
- Education: University of Georgia
- Years active: 1998–2024
- Children: 2

Charles Edge was an American computer scientist, author, podcaster, and a contributing author for Inc.com and Huffington Post.

Edge spent 15 years as the Chief Technology Officer of 318 Inc in Santa Monica and 5 years at Jamf. At the time of his death, he was the Chief Technology Officer of Bootstrappers.mn and HandrailUX. Edge spoke at Defcon, Blackhat, LinuxWorld, MacSysAdmin, and a number of other conferences.

Edge died on April 19, 2024.

== Bibliography (author) ==
- Mac Tiger Little Black Book. Paraglyph Press, February 2006, ISBN 1-933097-14-0
- Web Scripting Little Black Book. Paraglyph Press, April 2007, ISBN 1-933097-19-1
- Foundations of Mac OS X Security. Apress, March 2008, ISBN 1-59059-989-6
- Enterprise Mac Administrators Guide. Apress, October 2009, ISBN 1-4302-2443-6
- Foundations of Mac OS X Snow Leopard Security. Apress, February 2010, ISBN 1-4302-2730-3
- Beginning Mac OS X Server. Apress, February 2010, ISBN 1-4302-2772-9
- Mac OS X Lion Server. O'Reilley, January 2011, ISBN 1-4493-1605-0
- Using Apple Configurator. Packt, January 2012, ISBN 1849694060
- Take Control of OS X Yosemite Server. TidBits, January 2013, ISBN 978-1-61542-435-1
- Take Control of OS X Mavericks Server. TidBits, January 2014, ISBN 978-1-61542-435-1
- Learning iOS Security. Packt, January 2015, ISBN 1783551747
- Enterprise Mac Administrators Guide.Apress, September 2015, ISBN 1430224436
- Fundamentals of Mac OS X 10.11 Security.Apress, September 2015, ISBN 148421711X
- Enterprise Mac Security. Apress, ISBN 148421711X
- Build, Run, and Sell Your Apple Consulting Practice. Apress, August 2018, ISBN 9781484238349
- Apple Device Management. Apress, January 2020, ISBN 1484253876
- The ABCs of Computers (2022)
- The Startup Field Guide (2022)
- The History of Computers (2023)

== Podcasts ==
Edge maintained the following podcasts:

- MacAdmins Podcast https://podcast.macadmins.org
- Jamf After Dark Podcast https://podcasts.apple.com/us/podcast/jamf-after-dark/id1434572611
- The History Of Computing https://thehistoryofcomputing.net

== Community work ==
Edge worked on a number of open source projects including precache, swift-ldif-csv, and jssimporter and served on the board of directors of Tamarisk and on the corporate council of the Guthrie Theater.

Edge spoke at Black Hat 2007 and was scheduled to give a speech on a vulnerability of the Mac OS X FileVault at Black Hat 2008 but the talk was pulled after he cited a non-disclosure agreement the talk would violate. The talk was later disputed having ever existed.

Edge wrote the SANS course on Mac OS X Security in 2007, establishing baseline security practices for Apple and IoT devices in large-scale environments.

Edge founded the Minnesota non-profit Minnesota Computer History Museum in January 2020.

== Editor ==
Edge was on the Editorial team for the Apple Inc. platform, with Apress. Edge was also the technical editor for the following title(s):

- Mac OS X for Unix Geeks. O'Reilly, September 2008, ISBN 0-596-52062-X
