= Steve Edge (lawyer) =

British lawyer (born 1950)

Stephen Martin Edge (born 29 November 1950) was a British corporate tax lawyer. He was born and raised in Bolton, Lancashire. He attended Canon Slade School and Exeter University where he achieved a 2:2 in law. In 1973 he joined Slaughter and May where he has been a partner since 1982.

In 2008, The Times described Edge as the UK’s leading authority on corporate tax law.
