= Save the World Cup Act =

2026 proposed Act of Congress (USA)

United States Congress
- Long title: To provide that no Federal funds made available to the Department of Homeland Security or Department of Justice may be used to carry out any civil immigration enforcement activity within one mile of any 2026 Fédération Internationale de Football Association World Cup match or Fan Festival, and for other purposes.
- Considered by: United States Congress
- Introduced by: Representative Nellie Pou (D–NJ)
- Introduced: March 18, 2026
- Status: Not passed

The Save the World Cup Act is a proposed 2026 Act of Congress introduced by Representative Nellie Pou to limit immigration raids by U.S. Immigration and Customs Enforcement (ICE) in the immediate vicinity of 2026 FIFA World Cup events. The bill was introduced in response to human rights abuses by immigration officials at stadiums during the 2025 FIFA Club World Cup.

== Background ==
In 2018, the U.S. won a joint bid along with Mexico and Canada to host the 2026 FIFA World Cup. FIFA was later alerted to human rights abuses by immigration officials at stadiums during the 2025 FIFA Club World Cup.

Following the passage of the One Big Beautiful Bill Act in 2025, the U.S. Immigration and Customs Enforcement (ICE) became the most well-funded federal law enforcement agency in the country. Mass deportations and high-profile killings of U.S. citizens and non-citizens alike generated significant controversy and ignited widespread protests against ICE and the immigration policies of President Donald Trump overall.

In February 2026, the acting Director of ICE, Todd Lyons refused to pause ICE operations near games during the tournament while testifying during a United States House Committee on Homeland Security hearing, adding that ICE was a "key part of the overall security apparatus" for the event. The following month, Amnesty International published a report calling on the host governments to protect human rights and halt immigration raids at the World Cup. Furthermore, in April, Amnesty International joined the American Civil Liberties Union (ACLU) alongside 120 organizations to release a travel advisory cautioning visitors to the U.S. during the World Cup due to the Trump regime's deportation policies.

The U.S.'s involvement in the 2026 Iran war led to uncertainty regarding their national team's participation. Additionally, four participating countries (Haiti, Iran, Ivory Coast, and Senegal) were subject to the Trump travel bans. Members of the Iranian and Iraqi delegations were eventually detained and/or denied entry into the U.S.; Somali referee Omar Artan was also denied entry.

== Provisions ==
The Act calls to "provide that no Federal funds made available to the Department of Homeland Security or Department of Justice may be used to carry out any civil immigration enforcement activity within one mile" of matches or FIFA Fan Festival during the 2026 FIFA World Cup.

The Act exempts exigent circumstances, including an imminent risk of "death, violence, or physical harm to a person" or an imminent risk to national security.

== Legislative history ==
The Save the World Cup Act was introduced by Rep. Nellie Pou of New Jersey on March 18, 2026, with three original co-sponsors: LaMonica McIver, Eric Swalwell, and Bennie Thompson. It was referred to the House Judiciary Committee the same day. The Act was introduced as part of a package of bills related to restricting immigration enforcement activities. McIver and Swallwell sponsored the Protect World Cup Attendees Act and the Safe Passage to the World Cup Act, respectively, and each of the three legislators co-sponsored each one.

"With fewer than 90 days until kickoff, the World Cup should bring the world together and not leave families wondering if ICE agents will be waiting outside stadiums. When I recently asked the head of ICE directly for a simple assurance that they would stay away from the games, he refused. That is unacceptable. So my legislation draws a firm line on the pitch: no ICE raids." – U.S. Rep Nellie Pou, March 18, 2026

In addition to representing a plurality-Hispanic district (New Jersey's 9th) and being the first Latina representative from her state, Pou's district includes MetLife Stadium, which was scheduled to host eight matches, including the 2026 FIFA World Cup final.

Additional co-sponsors of the Act included Dina Titus, Julie Johnson, Frank Pallone, and Rob Menendez, all members of the Democratic Party. However, the bill was "unlikely to make much headway in GOP-controlled Washington before the World Cup kick[ed] off", according to the New Jersey Globe. Indeed, the bill stalled in the House; by May, it was reported in the Latin Times that it was "not expected to advance". It was ultimately not passed by the start of the World Cup in June.

== Reaction ==
Celso Thomas Castilho of the North American Congress on Latin America wrote that the Act "summons up an intense, if frustratingly forgotten, connection to Latino immigration activism during the 1994 World Cup", which took place against the backdrop of anti-immigrant politics. He contrasted the Save the World Cup Act and the related anti-ICE protests with the controversy surrounding Prop 187, also known as the Save Our State (SOS) initiative, which aimed to deny undocumented immigrants access to social services, education, and non-emergency healthcare. Protests were held during the 1994 tournament by Latin American immigrant communities in response to anti-immigrant and policing campaigns. The SOS initiative was heavily supported by California's Republican Governor, Pete Wilson, who embraced the issue en route to his re-election in 1994, while the mainstream media largely glossed over the controversies of the World Cup to produce a "dominant, sanitized version" of the events. Castilho concluded: "Reclaiming the narrative about USA ‘94 is about recognizing a history of political resistance. It is also about thinking about the “Save the World Cup Act” as part of a wave of broader social mobilizations, and insisting that soccer is political, as it long has been in the United States."

The Act was supported by organizations such as Win Without War and Action Network.
