= Venturella =

Venturella is a surname. Notable people with the surname include:

- Alessandro Venturella, British musician
- Michelle Venturella (born 1973), American softball player
- David Venturella (born 1965/1966), American former law enforcement officer
