= Priority Enforcement Program =

Agency responsible for immigration enforcement in the interior of the United States

The Priority Enforcement Program (PEP, sometimes also called PEP-COMM, PEP-Comm, or Pep-Comm) is a program by U.S. Immigration and Customs Enforcement (ICE), the agency responsible for immigration enforcement in the interior of the United States, under the U.S. Department of Homeland Security (DHS). PEP was an ICE program that worked with state and local law enforcement to identify undocumented immigrants (people who are not United States citizens or permanent residents) who come in contact with state or local law enforcement, and remove those who are removable (either because their presence is unauthorized, or because they committed an aggravated felony). PEP was announced by DHS Secretary Jeh Johnson in a November 20, 2014 memo as a replacement for Secure Communities (S-COMM). It builds on an updated list of immigration enforcement priorities released in another memo by Johnson issued on the same day.

The official rollout of the program started on July 2, 2015.

The enforcement priorities referenced in PEP were also relevant to other work by ICE as well as by U.S. Customs and Border Protection (CBP) related to immigration enforcement, apprehension, detention, and removal. However, PEP does not encompass these; PEP refers only to the ICE program that works with state and local law enforcement to identify and remove undocumented immigrants who come in contact with local law enforcement.

After the issuing of Executive Order 13768 by newly elected United States President Donald Trump on January 25, 2017, that revived the Secure Communities program, ICE discontinued the Priority Enforcement Program.

== Components ==
=== Enforcement priorities referenced in PEP ===
The Priority Enforcement Program relies on updated enforcement priorities released in a November 20, 2014 memo by DHS Secretary Jeh Johnson (note that these enforcement priorities apply DHS-wide and are not limited to PEP).

- Priority 1 (prioritized for removal) includes noncitizens who meet one or more of these criteria:
  - 1(a): national security threat
  - 1(b): apprehended immediately at the border
  - 1(c): gang member
  - 1(d): convicted of an offense classified as a felony in the state or local jurisdiction, other than one related to immigration status
  - 1(e): convicted of a felony or aggravated felony as defined by immigration law.
- Priority 2 (subject to removal) includes noncitizens who meet one or more of these criteria:
  - 2(a): convicted of three or more misdemeanors
  - 2(b): convicted of a serious misdemeanor. Serious misdemeanors are defined as offenses involving domestic violence, sexual abuse or exploitation, burglary, unlawful possession or use of a firearm, drug distribution or trafficking, driving under the influence, and other crimes in which a defendant was sentenced to actual custody of 90 days or more.
  - 2(c): entered the United States unlawfully after July 1, 2014
  - 2(d): significantly abused visas or visa waiver programs
- Priority 3 (generally subject to removal) includes noncitizens subject to a final order of removal issued on or after January 1, 2014.

An exception can be made to removing an undocumented immigrant who fits these priority categories if in the judgment of an ICE Field Office Director, CBP Sector Chief, or CBP Director of Field Operations, there are compelling and exceptional factors that clearly indicate the undocumented immigrant is not a threat to national security, border security, or public safety and should not therefore be an enforcement priority.

The memo does not forbid DHS agencies (ICE and CBP) from apprehending, detaining, and removing undocumented immigrant who are not in any of the three priority categories. However, resources should be dedicated to undocumented immigrants in the priority categories, and the removal of any undocumented immigrant not identified as a priority should only be carried out if, in the judgment of an ICE Field Office director, the removal serves an important federal interest. In addition, detention should not be used for people suffering from physical and mental illness, the disabled, elderly, pregnant, nursing, or primary caretakers of children and infirm people without approval from an ICE Field Office director.

=== Enforcement priorities within the scope of PEP ===
Unlike its predecessor S-COMM, PEP is more limited in focus. In particular, it does not seek to take custody of individuals charged only with civil immigration offenses, or those charged, but not convicted, of criminal offenses. Rather, it is focused on priority subcategories 1(a), 1(c), 1(d), 1(e), 2(a), and 2(b) in the November 2014 immigration enforcement priority list. With the exception of 1(a) (national security threat), all the other subcategories under the aegis of PEP are directly related to criminal convictions.

=== Immigration detainers ===
One key component of S-COMM, the predecessor of PEP, was the use of ICE detainers, where ICE sent Form I-247 detainers to state and local law enforcement agencies (LEAs) asking them to keep undocumented immigrants for up to 48 hours in law enforcement custody to give ICE time to take the individual in ICE custody. These detainers came under criticism both for leading to unconstitutional detention and for the added costs borne by law enforcement agencies. PEP replaced the I-247 detainers with three new forms:

- Form I-247N, Request for Voluntary Notification of Release of Suspected Priority Alien: The Form requests the local law enforcement agency to notify the ICE of the pending release from custody of a suspected priority removable individual at least 48 hours prior to release, if possible. The Form I-247N does not request or authorize the LEA to hold an individual beyond the point at which they would otherwise be released. Additionally, on the Form I-247N, ICE must identify the enforcement priority under which the individual falls.
- Form I-247D, Immigration Detainer - Request for Voluntary Action: The Form I-247D requests the receiving LEA maintain custody of the priority individual for a period not to exceed 48 hours beyond the time when they would have otherwise been released from custody. On this form, ICE must identify the enforcement priority under which the individual falls, as well as the basis for its determination of probable cause. The LEA must also serve a copy of the request on the individual in order for it to take effect. While similar to the original Form I-247, the need to state probable cause, as well as the requirement that the individual be served a copy, were an attempt to address some of the constitutional concerns surrounding detainers.
- Form I-247X, Request for Voluntary Transfer: This form is for enforcement priorities that do not fall under PEP. The Form I-247X requests the receiving LEA maintain custody of the priority individual for a period not to exceed 48 hours beyond the time when they would have otherwise been released from custody. The priority subcategories not covered by PEP, but for which ICE may otherwise seek transfer from cooperative jurisdictions are 1(b), 2(c), 2(d), and 3.

Below are some key differences between the old and new detainer policies:

- The 48-hour limit on requests to maintain custody now includes Saturdays, Sundays, and holidays.
- The detainer form requires that the LEA give a copy to the individual detained in order to be effective.
- Detainers are used much more rarely, and must be accompanied by probable cause in addition to a priority subcategory. The following are permissible probable causes:
  - A final order of removal
  - Pendency of removal proceedings
  - Biometric match indicating no lawful status or otherwise removable
  - Statements by the subject to an immigration officer and/or other reliable evidence
- Detainers are no longer issued simply for not having a biometric match in ICE databases. Additional evidence is needed to constitute probable cause for detention.

=== Biometric database ===
Another component of PEP is the biometric database. Secure Communities was designed to enhance interoperability of state and federal biometric databases by automating a check against ICE and U.S. Citizenship and Immigration Services (USCIS) records when state identification bureaus (SIB) submitted fingerprints to the Federal Bureau of Investigation (FBI), and thus became known as IDENT-IAFIS Interoperability, referring to the databases used by United States immigration authorities and federal law enforcement agencies, respectively.

Under PEP, IDENT-IAFIS Interoperability remained unchanged from Secure Communities. Also unchanged was the rollout to state and local law enforcement entities, wherein fingerprints or other biometrics collected by state agencies would automatically be checked against IDENT and IAFIS biometric databases, even over the objection of states and localities that sought not to participate in the immigration enforcement program. Through the rollout to state and local agencies, ICE could automatically be notified if a fingerprint in their database gave a positive hit for anyone run through a state or local jail or booking facility, enabling ICE to issue detainers and hold requests for persons who may have been stopped for nothing more than a minor traffic violation.

== History ==
=== Dissatisfaction with the Secure Communities program ===
Secure Communities, often written as S-COMM, was an effort pioneered in 2008 under George W. Bush and launched in 2009 under Barack Obama. The effort involved seeking cooperation from state and local law enforcement authorities in the enforcement of federal immigration laws. Two key ways that cooperation was sought were:

- Biometric database: The ICE and FBI had been working together to merge their fingerprint databases. Local law enforcement agencies participating in S-COMM would be asked to send any fingerprints they took of arrestees to ICE. In practice, this would mean running an automated check against ICE's database, and notifying ICE's Law Enforcement Support Center in case of a match.
- Detainer: If ICE is notified that a non-citizen has been arrested for a crime, ICE may place a detainer for the person. The detainer requests the jail to hold the person for 48 hours beyond the scheduled release date, so that ICE can take custody and initiate deportation proceedings.

The detainers in particular were the subject of criticism as well as legal challenge. Some courts ruled that holding people using the detainers (under some circumstances) was unconstitutional. For instance:

- In Miranda-Olivares v. Clackamas County, a federal magistrate judge in Oregon ruled that, when Clackamas County officials detained a woman solely on the basis of an immigration detainer, they violated her Fourth Amendment rights.
- In Galarza v. Szalczyk, the United States Court of Appeals for the Third Circuit ruled that Lehigh County officials had violated the Tenth Amendment by detaining Ernesto Galarza based on an ICE detainer after he had been granted bail after being arrested for a drug offense. Galarza was detained for more than 48 hours without notice of the basis of his detention or the ability to contest it. Three days later, immigration officials learned that he was a U.S. citizen, and he was released. The court agreed with Galarza that immigration detainers do not and cannot compel a state or local law enforcement agency to detain suspected non-citizens subject to removal.

Other cases that would later be cited as reasons for discontinuing S-COMM include Morales v. Chadbourne, Moreno v. Napolitano, Gonzalez v. ICE, Villars v. Kubiatoski, and Uroza v. Salt Lake City.

Another direction of criticism was that cooperating with the detainers imposed significant additional expenditures on state and local authorities, for which ICE did not reimburse them. This was the main stated motivation for Cook County's decision to stop complying with ICE detainers. Overall, S-COMM was criticized for creating mistrust between law enforcement and local communities, by adding the enforcement of immigration laws to their job. The design of PEP-COMM would in part be motivated by efforts to address these criticisms.

=== 2011 Morton memo ===
On June 17, 2011, John T. Morton, director of ICE, issued a memo on prosecutorial discretion that would subsequently be widely referred to as the "Morton memo," "2011 Morton memo," and "prosecutorial discretion memo." A second memo pertaining to prosecutorial discretion for witnesses and victims of crime was also issued on the same day.

The Morton memos built on earlier guidelines on the exercise of prosecutorial discretion, but went further by providing more explicit enforcement priorities, and explicitly telling ICE agents not to pursue some classes of removable non-citizens in order to focus on other ones. The memos were complemented by executive action by President Barack Obama in June 2012 on Deferred Action for Childhood Arrivals (DACA), which allowed people who had arrived in the United States as young children to defer their removal and made it possible for them to apply for employment authorization documents. Note that whereas the Morton memos were addressed to ICE asking it not to prosecute some classes of removable non-citizens, the June 2012 executive action involved creating an affirmative program, managed by United States Citizenship and Immigration Services (USCIS), to which some undocumented immigrants could apply.

=== November 2014 memos by Jeh Johnson (that led to the creation of the PEP) ===
In November 2014, a number of announcements were made by the administration of then United States president Barack Obama surrounding changes to immigration enforcement. The most famous of these announcements was Deferred Action for Parents of Americans (DAPA). Like DACA, the goal of DAPA was to create an affirmative program (under USCIS) that some removable non-citizens could apply to in order to have their removal deferred.

While Obama's main announcements were focused on affirmative programs (and therefore under the purview of USCIS), there were also updates on the immigration enforcement side, relevant to ICE as well as to CBP. These updates were announced in the form of two memos by DHS Secretary Jeh Johnson on November 20, 2014:

- The first memo, titled Policies for the Apprehension, Detention, and Removal of Undocumented Immigrants, was addressed to the heads of USCIS, ICE, and CBP. It listed a new set of enforcement priority categories and subcategories, along with some guidance on how to apply these new categories in determining whether to apprehend, detain, or remove individuals. The memo modified some of the enforcement priorities from the 2011 Morton memo. It would lead to updates to existing programs, field practice, and instruction manuals by ICE and CBP in subsequent months, leading to some controversy when some of the details of the new instructions leaked in January 2015.
- The second memo, titled Secure Communities, was addressed to ICE and the Office of Civil Rights and Civil Liberties. It announced the discontinuation of S-COMM and the creation of PEP as a replacement for it. The memo announced an immediate end to the I-247 detainers used as part of S-COMM and asked the ICE to come up with updated forms that would function as requests for notification rather than detention. The Office of Civil Rights and Civil Liberties was asked to develop a plan to monitor the implementation of the program by state and local LEAs to guard against the violation of people's civil rights and civil liberties. Based on this memo, the ICE would come up with the new detainer forms (I-247N, I-247D, and I-247X).

=== Attempted challenge in the United States House of Representatives (January 2015) ===
In January 2015, the United States House of Representatives passed a bill revoking the November 2014 executive action by President Barack Obama. One of the provisions of the bill reinstated the Secure Communities program and increased its funding. However, the bill was blocked in the Senate.

=== Official rollout starting July 2015 ===
On June 12, 2015, ICE released details on the new forms (I-247N, I-247D, and I-247X) as well as a brochure providing more information on PEP. The information is available on the page about PEP on ICE's website.

The official rollout of the Priority Enforcement Program began on July 2, 2015, although the ICE had begun the process of implementing the program as far back as November 2014.

As of August 2015, a month after the rollout began, many law enforcement agencies that had previously withdrawn from S-COMM were in talks with ICE and undecided about PEP. Philadelphia Mayor Michael E. Nutter, who had previously scaled back cooperation with DHS in April 2014, praised DHS Secretary Jeh Johnson for taking concerns into account when designing PEP, but was still not convinced that it made sense to participate. Cook County Board of Commissions Toni Preckwinkle issued a statement with a similar sentiment.

In October 2015, San Francisco's city government chose not to participate in PEP, and to restrict cooperation with federal law enforcement only for people convicted of serious crimes. This continued a tradition of San Francisco as a sanctuary city since 1989.

In contrast, the Los Angeles County Sheriff Department, that had withdrawn from the 287(g) program and was generally averse to local law enforcement cooperating with ICE, is participating in PEP. In May 2015, the Board ruled to look into participating in PEP. In September 2015, an official decision to participate in PEP was reached.

=== Discontinuation in 2017 ===
In January 2017, Donald Trump took office as President of the United States, after a campaign where he promised stricter immigration enforcement policies. On January 25, Trump issued Executive Order 13768 titled Enhancing Public Safety in the Interior of the United States. Among other things, the Executive Order revived the Secure Communities program. In a Q&A published on February 21, 2017, the United States Department of Homeland Security clarified that it was discontinuing the PEP and reinstating Secure Communities due to the executive order.

== Reception ==
=== Reception by state and local governments and law enforcement agencies ===
In the wake of the killing of Kathryn Steinle by an undocumented immigrant, police chiefs and sheriffs from jurisdictions throughout the United States signed a letter to Chuck Grassley and Patrick Leahy arguing that PEP was a good way forward for local law enforcement and DHS to cooperate without overburdening local law enforcement, and that there was no need to pass additional legislation requiring state and local cooperation with federal immigration agencies.

Local law enforcement agencies that had participated in S-COMM are continuing to participate in PEP, whereas those that had withdrawn from S-COMM have been evaluating PEP but not made a decision either way regarding participation.

=== Reception by civil rights, immigrant rights, and legal advocacy groups ===
The American Civil Liberties Union responded to the original Johnson memo by releasing a backgrounder. The backgrounder noted that whereas PEP was a step in the right direction, the "probable cause" definition was still too loose, and insufficient to address the Fourth Amendment-based challenge to S-COMM. In June 2015, the ACLU penned an open letter to Jeh Johnson with recommendations for improving PEP. Among the recommendations in the letter was the requirement that the probable cause notices be approved by a judge (i.e., judicially determined). ACLU's criticism of PEP was covered by the Washington Post in an article on the program's rollout.

The National Day Laborer Organizing Network (NDLON), that had previously been critical of S-COMM, was critical of PEP, with its key concern being that the changes to the program were too cosmetic. NDLON also filed a Freedom of Information Act request to learn more about the program.

The National Immigration Law Center was also critical of PEP, citing both constitutional concerns and its effect of causing the separation of families.

Angela Chan, policy director of the Asian Law Caucus, said that there were alarming similarities between S-COMM and PEP, and also said that Obama's slogan of "felons, not families" should be considered in the context of many communities being overpoliced and overcriminalized.

The Immigration Policy Center has taken a more cautious approach, noting that PEP is an improvement over S-COMM in principle, but awaiting further details on the implementation.

=== Reception by groups interested in restricting immigration, particularly illegal immigration ===
Groups interested in limiting immigration and combating illegal immigration see PEP as a step backward from S-COMM, and have been critical of it. In remarks at a press conference hosted by the Texas Sheriffs Association, Jessica Vaughan of the Center for Immigration Studies (a think tank that advocates low immigration levels), said that "PEP will result in the release of even more criminal aliens back to the streets, with local communities — and especially law enforcement agencies — left to deal with the consequences." She said that ICE arrests in Texas were already down 28% from the previous year, and criminal non-citizen arrests down 25%.

In June 2015, the United States House Judiciary Subcommittee on Immigration and Border Security released a report on PEP. Based on the report, Committee Chairman Bob Goodlatte argued that the implementation of PEP endangered communities (relative to S-COMM). The report was cited in the Washington Times and by NumbersUSA, an advocacy group favoring low immigration numbers. Quoting from the report, NumbersUSA noted that PEP even ignored the implementation of some of the priority subcategories identified in the November 2014 memo (specifically, 1(b), 2(c), 2(d), and 3).
