= Secure Communities =

American deportation program

Secure Communities is a data-sharing program that relies on coordination between federal, state, and local law enforcement agencies. The program was designed to "check the immigration status of every single person arrested by local police anywhere in the country". As part of the program, fingerprints that are taken upon arrest, which are traditionally forwarded to the FBI, are then also forwarded to the Department of Homeland Security (DHS) . If these finger prints match the DHS's Automated Biometric Identification System (IDENT), then the ICE district office decides whether or not to issue a detainer request which can include requesting that the person be detained for up to 48 hours (I-247D), or a request for ICE to be notified upon their release (I-247N).

Between July 2015 and January 2017, Secure Communities was replaced by the Priority Enforcement Program (PEP). The goal of PEP was to "target resources toward detaining and deporting individuals convicted of significant criminal offenses."

On January 25, 2017, President Donald Trump signed Executive Order 13768 re-instituting Secure Communities (see section 10), indicating that it would penalize jurisdictions that did not comply with the program, and re-expanded immigration enforcement priorities to include even those not convicted of serious criminal offenses.

On January 20, 2021, President Joe Biden revoked EO 13768.

Currently the website ICE indicates that the web page ice.gov/secure-communities is "archived and not reflective of current practice"

== Overview ==
Secure Communities relied on integrated databases and partnerships with local and state jailers to build domestic deportation capacity. The goals, as outlined in a 2009 report to Congress, are to: "1. IDENTIFY criminal aliens through modernized information sharing; 2. PRIORITIZE enforcement actions to ensure apprehension and removal of dangerous criminal aliens; and 3. TRANSFORM criminal alien enforcement processes and systems to achieve lasting results."

John Morton of Immigration and Customs Enforcement ICE called Secure Communities "the future of immigration enforcement" because it "focuses our resources on identifying and removing the most serious criminal offenders first and foremost."

Concerns were raised for misrepresenting who was being targeted and what was expected of law enforcement partners. Secure Communities was created administratively, not by congressional mandate and, throughout its implementation, no regulations were promulgated to govern the program's implementation.

== History ==
Secure Communities was piloted in 2008. Under the administration of George W. Bush, ICE recruited a total of 14 jurisdictions. The first program partner was Harris County Sheriff's Office (Texas).

By March 2011, under President Barack Obama, the program was expanded to over 1,210 jurisdictions. ICE sought to have all 3,141 jurisdictions (state, county, and local jails and prisons) participating by 2013.

From Secure Communities' activation through March 2011, 140,396 convicted criminal aliens were booked into ICE custody resulting in 72,445 deportations. Each year, law enforcement officers arrest approximately one million noncitizens accused of crimes.

== Operation ==
=== Biometric database ===
Secure Communities relied on partnerships and biometric technology to build deportation capacity. "ICE and the FBI are working together to take advantage of the strong relationships already forged between the FBI and state and local law enforcement necessary to assist ICE in achieving their goals," said FBI Criminal Justice Information Services (CJIS) Assistant Director Tom Bush in 2009.

For every person arrested and booked, state or local authorities ran fingerprints against federal immigration and criminal databases. IDENT is an DHS-owned database that keeps biometric records of immigration applicants, certain criminals, and those suspected of or known to be terrorists. IAFIS is an FBI-owned database of biometric criminal records. Ordinarily, the fingerprints of county and state arrestees are submitted to the FBI only. Under Secure Communities, the prints were also submitted to ICE. If an individual's fingerprints matched those of a non U.S. citizen (including legal resident), an automated process notifies the Law Enforcement Support Center (LESC) of ICE. Officials then evaluate the case, based on immigration status and criminal history.

The net effect, according to former ICE Secretary Julie L. Myers, was to "create a virtual ICE presence at every local jail."

Secure Communities Program: Submissions to ICE (2009, 2010, YTD 2011)
| Year | Total Submissions to ICE |
| 2009 | 828,119 |
| 2010 | 3,376,753 |
| 2011 (first five months) | 2,414,079 |

=== Request ===
When there was a match, ICE could choose to place a "detainer" on the individual. This is a request for the jail to hold that person for up to 48 hours beyond the scheduled release date, so that ICE can take custody and initiate deportation proceedings. Legal immigrants convicted of certain crimes are subject to deportation. Undocumented immigrants can be deported even if they have committed no crime. ICE officials told the New York Times that, because of flaws in the database system, about 5,880 people identified through Secure Communities turned out to be United States citizens by 2009. The New Mexico Sentencing Commission is preparing to survey the costs to jails of holding prisoners under ICE detainers.

== Offense levels ==
During the program, ICE divided immigrant prisoners into three risk levels:

- Level 1: those convicted of serious crimes, such as homicide, kidnapping, robbery, major drug offenses with sentences greater than one year, and offenses involving threats to national security.
- Level 2: all other felonies; and
- Level 3: misdemeanors and lesser crimes.

Secure Communities Executive Director David Venturella testified to Congress: "We have adopted a risk-based strategy that focuses, first, on criminal aliens who pose the greatest threat to our communities. To manage this increased workload and prudently scale the system capabilities, we are classifying all criminal aliens based on the severity of the crimes they have been convicted of." According to the agency, Secure Communities prioritizes illegal immigrants who have been accused or convicted of "crimes involving national security, homicide, kidnapping, assault, robbery, sex offenses, and narcotics violations carrying sentences of more than one year."

Immigrant activist organizations noted that most unauthorized immigrants deported by ICE had not committed serious criminal offenses.

Others asserted that the number of non-criminal detainees was overstated for political reasons. In June 2010, the AFL-CIO office that represents 7,000 ICE officers issued a no-confidence vote for the current ICE director alleging, among other things, that the number of non-criminal ICE deportees is over-stated due to the fact that many offenders have agreed to be deported if all charges against them are dropped and are being re-categorized as non-criminal. The report cites as proof that although ICE internally reports that 90% of all ICE detainees in its custody were arrested by local authorities, it publicly publishes otherwise.

== Costs and impacts ==
The implementation of the program was criticized for not sticking to its original goals of deporting serious criminals, instead using the program as a general deportation facilitation tool. The Obama administration, increasingly aware of the negative impact of its deportation policies on the administration's prospects in the presidential election, moved toward mollifying some aspects of the Secure Communities enforcement policies.

The authors of a 2011 study released by the Chief Justice Earl Warren Institute on Law and Social Policy at UC Berkeley School of Law highlighted several findings:

- Only 52% of Secure Communities arrestees were scheduled to have a hearing before a judge.
- Approximately 88,000 families that included U.S. citizens had a family member arrested under the Secure Communities program.
- Among Secure Communities arrestees who had an immigration hearing, only 24% had an attorney.
- ICE arrested roughly 3,600 United States citizens through the program.

The costs of the program were unclear. The Houston Chronicle reported in 2008 that, according to ICE officials, "cost [is] between $930 million and $1 billion. Congress dedicated $200 million for the program in 2008 and set aside $150 million for fiscal year 2009." Currently Secure Communities does not provide for reimbursement to states and localities for the costs of participation.

A New York Times editorial called Secure Communities "misguided," in part for how it "[strains] local resources." Meanwhile, a Washington Post editorial praised the program, asserting that it "has neither inclination nor resources to deport suspects with otherwise clean records who have been arrested for low-level infractions."

Two 2014 studies found that the Secure Communities program did not significantly affect the crime rate. A 2018 paper found that undocumented immigrants in localities participating in Secure Communities experienced a 14.7% increase in mental health distress and a significant reduction in their perceived health status. The authors attribute this to the fear and stress caused by heightened risk of deportation. Another 2018 paper found that, due to Secure Communities, legal Hispanic immigrants were less likely to use federal means-tested programs, except in jurisdictions with sanctuary policies in place. A 2022 study found that the program reduced the labor supply of college-educated U.S.-born mothers with young children by increasing the cost of outsourcing household production. A 2024 study highlights that Secure Communities leads to an elevated occurrence of adverse birth outcomes among infants born to foreign-born Hispanic mothers.

== Lawsuit ==
Significant data disclosures on Secure Communities' performance became publicly available after non-profit advocacy groups sued for disclosure.

In July 2009, DHS issued new regulations that asserted all information regarding a Secure Communities sister program "shall not be considered public records." New contracts prohibited local officials from communicating with media or constituents about the program without ICE approval.

Citing transparency concerns, the National Day Laborer Organizing Network (NDLON), the Center for Constitutional Rights (CCR) and the Immigration Justice Clinic of the Benjamin N. Cardozo School of Law filed a request under the Freedom of Information Act for information on Secure Communities.

The groups charged in a press release: "Although ICE presents Secure Communities as an innocuous information sharing program, it seems designed to function as a dragnet to funnel even more people into the already mismanaged ICE detention and removal system... no regulations have been promulgated and little information is available about the program in the public domain. The limited information that has been released is vague and seems to indicate that ICE is not executing its stated enforcement priorities."

Federal authorities released an initial batch of 15,000 internal documents in February 2011. The non-profits started a blog entitled "Uncover the Truth" to catalogue the newly obtained government documents and media coverage of the program.

== State and local attempts to withdraw ==
Some jurisdictions tried to "opt out" from the program believing that participation was not mandatory. Homeland Security officials have contradicted each other about whether Secure Communities is mandatory or voluntary.

An August 2010 DHS memo entitled "Secure Communities: Setting the Record Straight" suggested that counties had the ability to opt out of the program, even when their respective states have joined: "If a jurisdiction does not wish to activate on its scheduled date in the Secure Communities deployment plan, it must formally notify its state identification bureau and ICE in writing (email, letter or facsimile). Upon receipt of that information, ICE will request a meeting with federal partners, the jurisdiction, and the state to discuss any issues and come to a resolution, which may include adjusting the jurisdiction's activation date in or removing the jurisdiction from the deployment plan."

On September 7, 2010, DHS Secretary Janet Napolitano said in a letter to Congresswoman Zoe Lofgren that jurisdictions that wished to withdraw from the program could do so. Yet an October 2010 Washington Post article quoted an anonymous senior ICE official asserting: "Secure Communities is not based on state or local cooperation in federal law enforcement...State and local law enforcement agencies are going to continue to fingerprint people and those fingerprints are forwarded to FBI for criminal checks. ICE will take immigration action appropriately."

At a press conference days later, Napolitano modified her position: "What my letter said was that we would work with them on the implementation in terms of timing and the like...But we do not view this as an opt-in, opt-out program." She did not provide legal justification. Meanwhile, in Arlington, VA, the County Board unanimously passed a resolution to opt out of Secure Communities.

Venturella stated at a policy conference: "Have we created some of the confusion out there? Absolutely we have." In a January 2009 letter to the California Department of Justice, Venturella indicated that ICE would obtain a Statement of Intent for every county-level participant in Secure Communities. Yet a procedure to do so never materialized.

In California, three counties unsuccessfully petitioned outgoing Attorney General Jerry Brown to withdraw their jurisdictions from the program. San Mateo's sheriff and Board of Supervisors feared the chilling effect that integration of state and ICE databases would have on immigrants as volunteers in public programs.

Santa Clara Supervisor George Shirakawa, criticizing Secure Communities as an unfunded mandate, said, "We are not in a position to do ICE's work." Deputy Counsel Anjali Bhargava is investigating whether the county can limit participation "the extent [ICE requests] are subject to reimbursement or required by law."

San Francisco Sheriff Michael Hennessey, supported by a supermajority of the Board of Supervisors, requested three times in writing to opt out of Secure Communities. His jail already has a policy of reporting to ICE anyone booked for a felony and not US-born. He feared that fingerprint sharing for all prisoners, including those acquitted of charges, violates the local sanctuary ordinance without serving public safety. "The lack of clarity," Hennessey wrote in a lawsuit against ICE, "makes it difficult for me to explain my attempts to opt-out to my colleagues and to be accountable to my constituents."

In a surprise move, Massachusetts Governor Deval Patrick signed up for Secure Communities soon after winning re-election. He had rejected participation months earlier because a pilot run of the program in Boston was still unproven. Public Safety Secretary Mary Beth Heffernan explained the reversal in position: "It has become clear now that this program is going to be mandatory for all communities in the near future." Patrick reversed this decision on June 7, 2011, saying he was "dubious about [Massachusetts] taking on the federal role of immigration enforcement... and even more skeptical of the potential impact Secure Communities could have."

Washington, D.C., and the states of New York and Illinois also tried to opt out of the program.

In 2011 the governors of Massachusetts, Illinois and New York announced their desire to pull out of the Secure Communities program, as did municipal officials in Los Angeles, San Francisco and Boston. The Congressional Hispanic Caucus asked President Obama to suspend the deportation program, which is based on administrative authority only. According to Boston mayor Thomas Menino, the program, contrary to its stated goal, "is negatively impacting public safety" and numerous immigrants have been deported after committing only minor traffic violations. John T. Morton, the head of United States Immigration and Customs Enforcement, responded by asserting the agency's intention to extend the program nationwide by 2013, regardless of local assent.

In the August 18, 2011 letter from the office of Governor Pat Quinn of Illinois to John Morton, the Governor demanded that ICE confirm the willingness of each of the 26 Illinois counties (previously) "activated" to continue participation in Secure Communities, by contacting the counties directly. The State reacted to making the "troubled program" "mandatory and nationwide". According to the letter, the Secure Communities program was "contrary to the terms of the Memorandum of Agreement between ICE and the Illinois State Police and ignores the State of Illinois' May 4, 2011 termination of its participation". The Governor was deeply troubled by Secure Communities having the effect opposite to its stated purpose, as ordinary individuals not involved in crimes are frequently targeted and the role of local law enforcement and the communities' involvement in public safety are compromised. Of those deported from Illinois through May 2011, by ICE's own accounting, less than 22% were convicted of a serious crime, 75% were never convicted of a serious crime and more than 21% were not convicted of any crime. Secure Communities, as currently structured, is far different from the program that was originally presented to the State of Illinois and its constituent counties. The Governor's letter hinted at a possible legal challenge, by stating that the State would continue to monitor and evaluate the program and consider all of its available options.

On December 21, 2012, ICE issued new detainer guidelines to prioritize ICE's limited resources by directing that detainers be issued in only specific circumstances.

== Detainer issues ==
Cook County, Illinois Board of Commissioners passed the "immigration detainer ordinance", which ended the County's compliance with ICE immigration detainers, in September 2011. The board was motivated mainly by the desire to avoid the expenses the County was incurring because of holding detained aliens for an additional 48 hours, to facilitate ICE deportation proceedings. Since the financial burden was substantial and the cost was not being reimbursed by the federal government, the County decided to end the 48-hour hold practice, effectively terminating its cooperation with ICE. Currently, under pressure from the Obama administration, efforts are on the way to scale back the ordinance. The ordinance conditions the County's participation in the detainer program on monetary reimbursements from the federal government and ICE Director John Morton has made a partial offer in that respect in February. The federal government, Cook County Sheriff Tom Dart and others involved in the present attempt to revoke the County policy claim acting in the interest of public safety and wanting to keep dangerous criminals locked up.

In one publicized case, Saul Chavez, an undocumented immigrant, caused a fatal hit-and-run accident, and, released by a Cook County judge on a low bond, disappeared. Chavez' case is used by proponents of respecting ICE detainers in Cook County, but if he has fled to Mexico, as is believed, the same outcome (a deportation) would have been produced by an ICE intervention.

In Connecticut, a class-action suit was filed, according to which the policy of detainers violates numerous constitutional provisions. A spokesman for Governor Dannel Malloy announced that federal immigration detainers would be honored in Connecticut only on a case-by-case basis. ICE officials used threats of legal action and financial consequences (withdrawal of unrelated federal funds designated for the localities in question) to compel state and local participation in its deportation program, but the federal government is believed to lack the legal authority necessary to require state and local governments to actively enforce federal law.

The Cook County policy on detainers was characterized as "terribly misguided" by Secretary of Homeland Security Janet Napolitano, who testified before the Senate Judiciary Committee on April 25, 2012. An investigation conducted by Chip Mitchell and other Chicago WBEZ reporters failed to substantiate the claim that inmates freed because of the Cook County detainer ordinance endanger the public more than other former inmates do, and that therefore the ordinance undermines public safety in the County.

On July 3, 2012 a lawsuit was filed by James Makowski, claiming he was wrongly imprisoned for two months as a result of the Secure Communities immigration enforcement program. The plaintiff, a U.S. citizen, argues the Federal Bureau of Investigation (FBI) and Department of Homeland Security (DHS) violated his rights under the Privacy Act.

As a result of the discrepancy with Makowski's records when he was detained and fingerprinted, an automatic immigration detainer was issued without ever interviewing him or providing him the opportunity to produce his U.S. passport, social security card, or driver's license. Lawyers say that Makowski was wrongfully imprisoned for two months until he was able to hire an attorney to convince DHS to rescind its detainer.

The lawsuit was the first litigation challenging Secure Communities.

== Initial discontinuation in 2014 ==
In a memo dated November 20, 2014, Department of Homeland Security Secretary Jeh Johnson discontinued the Secure Communities program. Johnson states, "The overarching goal of Secure Communities remains in my view a valid and important law enforcement objective, but a fresh start and a new program are necessary. ... Further, to address the increasing number of federal court decisions that hold that detainer-based detention by state and local law enforcement agencies violates the Fourth Amendment, I am directing ICE to replace requests for detention (i.e., requests that an agency hold an individual beyond the point at which they would otherwise be released) with requests for notification (i.e., requests that state or local law enforcement notify ICE of a pending release during the time that person is otherwise in custody under state or local authority)." Secure Communities was replaced by the Priority Enforcement Program (PEP). Experts and critics cast doubt on the practical differences between Secure Communities and the Priority Enforcement Program, noting that little had changed other than the name.

The National Immigrant Justice Center, along with pro bono partners Winston & Strawn LLP and McDermott Will & Emery LLP, has litigated some of the Secure Communities program's most serious constitutional violations in Jimenez-Moreno v. Napolitano and Makowski v. United States, two cases cited in the PEP memos that contributed greatly to the initial discontinuation of Secure Communities.

== Restoration (2017) ==
On January 25, 2017, President Donald Trump signed Executive Order 13768 re-instituting Secure Communities (see section 10), indicating that it would penalize jurisdictions that did not comply with the program, and re-expanded immigration enforcement priorities to include even those not involving serious criminal offenses.

On January 20, 2021, President Joe Biden revoked EO 13768.

Secure Communities was primarily a data-sharing program, and biometric information of people arrested continues to be sent both to the FBI and to DHS to flag for potential immigration violations. This practice still continues, and is now described under an ICE page called "Criminal Apprehension Program."
