= Todd Lyons =

American law enforcement officer

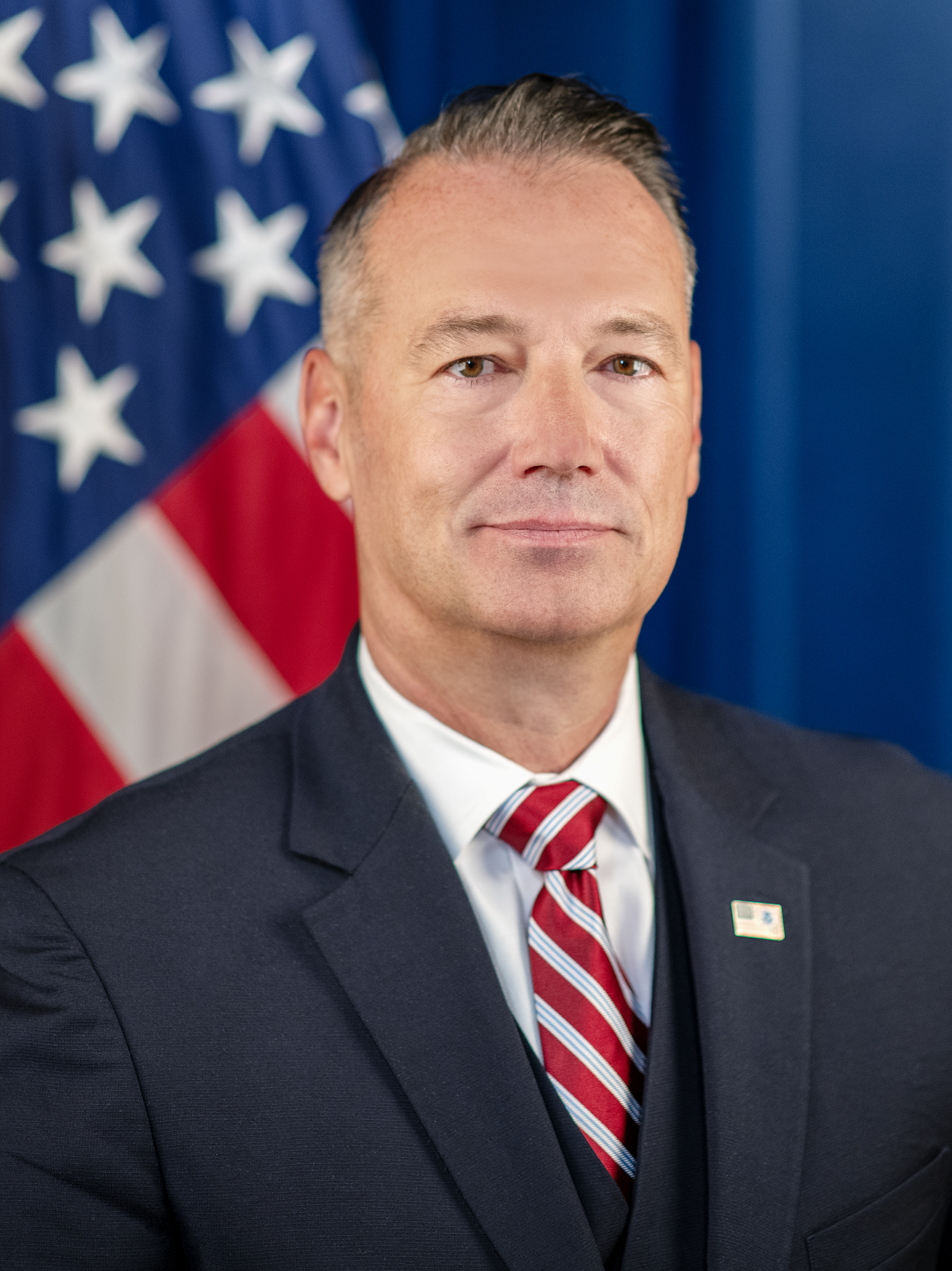
- Official portrait, 2023

Acting Director of U.S. Immigration and Customs Enforcement
- In office March 9, 2025 – May 31, 2026
- President: Donald Trump
- Deputy: Madison Sheahan; Charles Wall
- Preceded by: Caleb Vitello (acting)
- Succeeded by: David Venturella (acting)

Personal details
- Born: Todd Michael Lyons c.1973 (age 52–53)
- Education: New England College (BA, MA)

Military service
- Allegiance: United States
- Branch/service: United States Air Force, Special Operations Command Central
- Years of service: 1993–1999, 2001–2007 (end date unknown)

Todd Michael Lyons (born c. 1973) is a law enforcement officer who served as the acting director of U.S. Immigration and Customs Enforcement from March 9, 2025 to May 31, 2026.

== Early life and education ==
Lyons attended Boston College High School and later graduated from New England College with a master's degree in criminal justice leadership.

== Career ==
=== 1993-2006 ===
Lyons served in the United States Air Force starting in 1993 and entered law enforcement in 1999 in Florida. After the September 11 attacks he was recalled to active duty and was deployed overseas, serving as the Antiterrorism/force protection liaison for the Special Operations Command Central.

=== 2007-2024 ===
Lyons joined U.S. Immigration and Customs Enforcement's (ICE) Enforcement and Removal Operations (ERO) division as an immigration enforcement agent in 2007. He began his service in Dallas, Texas. He served as the chief of staff for the ERO Dallas Field Office director from August 2014 to March 2015 and as an assistant field office director in ERO Dallas from April 2015 to September 2017.

After working for ICE in Dallas, Lyons began working for the agency in Boston, Massachusetts. He held the title of field office director for ERO in Boston, thus overseeing all ERO activities across six states in New England. In October 2024, he was promoted to the position of acting assistant director of field operations for ICE.

=== 2025-2026 ===
After Donald Trump won the 2024 presidential election, Lyons was described as a "favorite" to be named director of U.S. Immigration and Customs Enforcement, but Caleb Vitello was chosen for the role instead. In February 2025, Lyons became the acting head of ICE ERO. On March 9, 2025, after Vitello was reassigned, Lyons was named the new acting director of ICE.

Speaking at the Border Security Expo in April 2025, Lyons stated his aim to transform immigration enforcement into a business:

We need to get better at treating this like a business, where this mass deportation operation is something like you would see and say, like Amazon trying to get your Prime delivery within 24 hours. . . . So trying to figure out how to do that with human beings.

On May 12, 2025, Lyons authored a secret memorandum that was later leaked by a whistleblower. ICE officers were told to follow the memo's guidance instead of written training materials. The memo authorized ICE officers to forcibly enter people's homes without a judge's warrant, stating:

Although the U.S. Department of Homeland Security (DHS) has not historically relied on administrative warrants alone to arrest aliens subject to final orders of removal in their place of residence, the DHS Office of the General Counsel has recently determined that the U.S. Constitution, the Immigration and Nationality Act and the immigration regulations do not prohibit relying on administrative warrants for this purpose.

Administrative warrants are generated and signed by ICE agents and are not approved of by either federal district court or magistrate judges. Historically administrative warrants were used to arrest individuals in public places, and only judicial warrants could authorize ICE agents to enter private residences. The practice described by the memo is likely a violation of the Fourth Amendment which requires a warrant issued by a judge to authorize physical intrusion into private residencies. Although addressed to all ICE officers, the memo was only shared with select DHS officials who were directed to verbally brief this policy to ICE officers during training. The memo was to be kept confidential under risk of potential firing.

On July 8, 2025, Lyons authored another memorandum that expanded the pool of immigrants that could be detained without the opportunity for a bond hearing by reclassifying those already in the country that had entered without inspection as "seeking admission" under 8 U.S.C. § 1225(b)(2)(A).

In March 2026, Politico reported that Lyons had been hospitalized at least twice for stress-related issues during the prior seven months.

On April 16, 2026, Lyons announced that he would be stepping down as Acting ICE Director, with his resignation taking effect on May 31, 2026. He explained that he was seeking to spend more time with his family, particularly his sons.

Government offices
Preceded by Caleb Vitello; Acting	Director of U.S. Immigration and Customs Enforcement; Acting; 2025–2026	Succeeded by David Venturella; Acting
