= Gonzalez v. ICE =

Class action federal lawsuit regarding US federal immigration detention

Gonzalez v. ICE was a class action lawsuit that challenged the U.S. Immigration and Customs Enforcement's use of faulty databases in issuing immigration detainers. This case raised significant civil rights issues regarding the rights of arrested individuals under the Fourth Amendment and how immigration detainers based on faulty database information violated those rights. It also created new limits on how local police authorities are allowed to assist in federal immigration activities and procedures.

== Background ==
=== U.S. Immigration and Customs Enforcement (ICE) ===
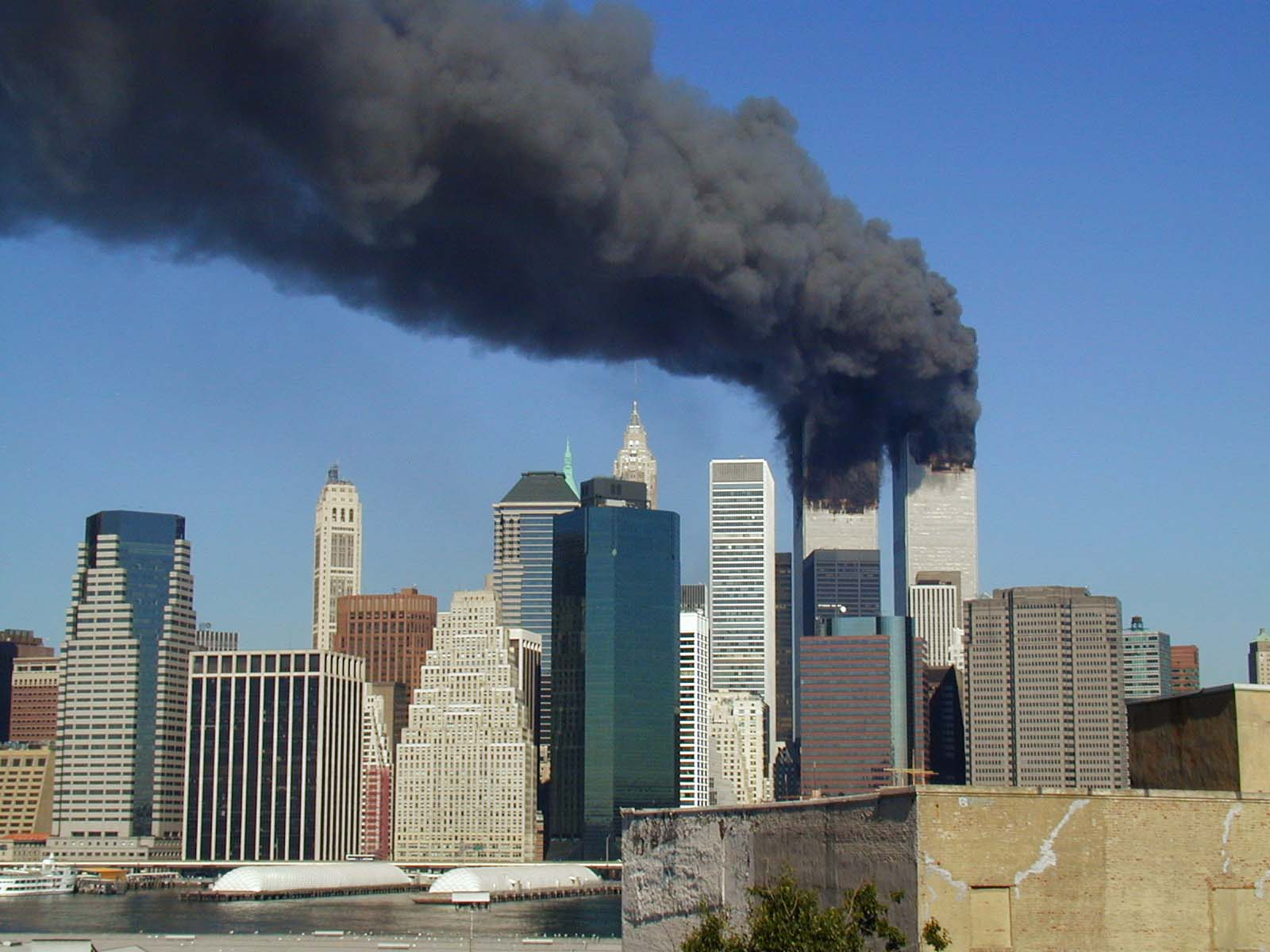
Terrorist attacks of 9/11

The U.S. Immigration and Customs Enforcement (ICE) agency was originally founded as a counter-response to the attacks of 9/11. These attacks raised serious security concerns about the millions of undocumented, unauthorized immigrants living in the U.S. during this time. As the United States declared its "war on terror", the federal government created ICE as a sub-division of the U.S. Department of Homeland Security in 2003. The initial mission of ICE was to focus on preventing and countering terrorist attacks and serious criminal activities (human trafficking, gangs, sexual predators, etc.). However, there has been a significant shift in these goals over the years as the U.S.'s political climate has evolved and new presidents have stepped into office.

U.S. Immigration and Customs Enforcement Logo

==== 287(g) partnerships ====
Starting in 2006, ICE significantly increased the number of 287(g) partnerships it had with local law enforcement agencies. These partnerships were legalized by the Illegal Immigration Reform and Immigration Responsibility Act of 1996 when Section 287(g) was added. This section allowed federal government agencies and local law enforcement agencies to join voluntary partnerships to regulate and increase the enforcement of immigration law. Since then, ICE leadership has used these collaborative partnerships to train local law enforcement agencies in immigration enforcement and supervise their immigration enforcement operations.

==== Secure Communities Program ====
In 2007, President George W. Bush approved federal funding for the establishment of a new federal immigration enforcement program – the Secure Communities Program (S-Comm). The purpose of this program was to target the removal of noncitizens from U.S. prisons and jails. It is essentially an extension of Section 287(g) in that S-Comm allows state and local police agencies to become key participants in enforcing federal immigration laws. As part of their new strategy to counter illegal immigration, ICE used the program's biometric databases to locate and deport "criminal aliens" being held in state and local police custody.

ICE intended to use S-Comm to focus its efforts on apprehending illegal immigrants with histories of serious crimes. Local law enforcement agencies that partner with S-Comm are expected to share the fingerprint records of every detained individual in their custody with ICE, regardless of whether their charges were "minor, eventually dismissed, or the result of an unlawful arrest". ICE agents then cross-reference these fingerprints with the biometric databases of the Federal Bureau of Investigation (FBI) and the Department of Homeland Security (DHS) to determine that individual's immigration status. Based on these database results, any individual that ICE determines to be of illegal status are eligible to be taken out of local law enforcement custody and promptly deported through ICE, regardless of their trial status, crime, or sentence length.

==== Priority Enforcement Program ====
In response to the rising tide of criticisms and abuse-of-power accusations against the S-Comm program, the Obama administration suspended all S-Comm operations in 2014. It was replaced with the administration's new program, the Priority Enforcement Program (PEP). This program placed several restrictions on ICE's authority to pursue and carry out deportations under Section 287(g). However, in January 2017 the Trump administration pushed through an executive order that both dissolved the PEP program and re-established the S-Comm program with all its previous powers and functions.

==== Pacific Enforcement Response Center ====
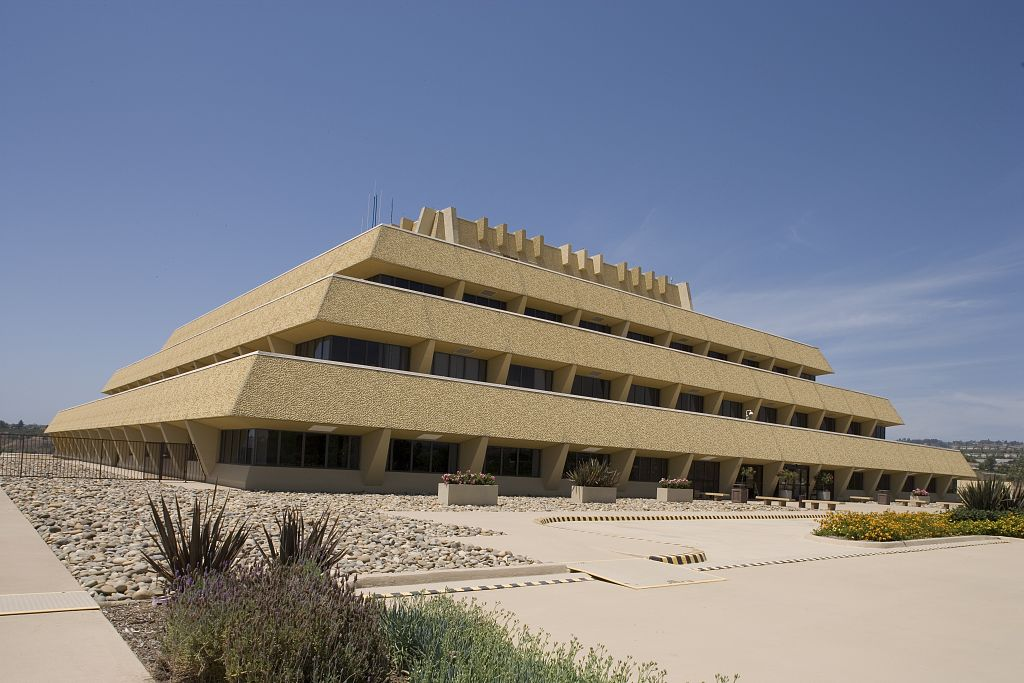
Office of Homeland Security Department in Laguna Niguel, CA

Beginning in 2015, ICE expanded its nationwide reach through the formation of the Pacific Enforcement Response Center (PERC). It was created to assist ICE's Law Enforcement Support Center (LESC) and the Enforcement and Removal Operations (ERO). Currently, the PERC serves as a "tactical force multiplier" to help in organizing and distributing the vast amount of immigration detainers sent from the LESC and ERO to local law enforcement agencies. The center is located in Laguna Niguel, California.

== Immigration detainers ==
Immigration detainers are a key tool that ICE uses in identifying, tracking, and deporting immigrants with criminal records. When ICE's biometric databases identify an individual taken into local police custody as an illegal immigrant, an ICE agent sends out a detainer request to that specific jail or prison.

The original purpose of immigration detainers was to alert local prison agents of the federal government's interest in a prisoner as a suspect of illegal immigration. Federal immigration agents could also request that the local prison or jail notify them of a suspected prisoner's release beforehand. However, in 1987 new federal regulations added strength to detainers by mandating local and state law enforcement agencies to keep prisoners with a detainer in custody for an extra forty-eight hours after they were originally supposed to be released. This new regulation now allows ICE agents more time to pick up and deport targeted individuals before they are released.

=== Immigration detainer controversy in California ===
For many years California has been considered a "sanctuary state", meaning that it is one of a handful of states in the U.S. known for adopting sanctuary-friendly policies for immigrants of all statuses. However, the use of immigration detainers and other ICE methods of deportation has been widely debated among Californian citizens and policy-makers in recent decades.

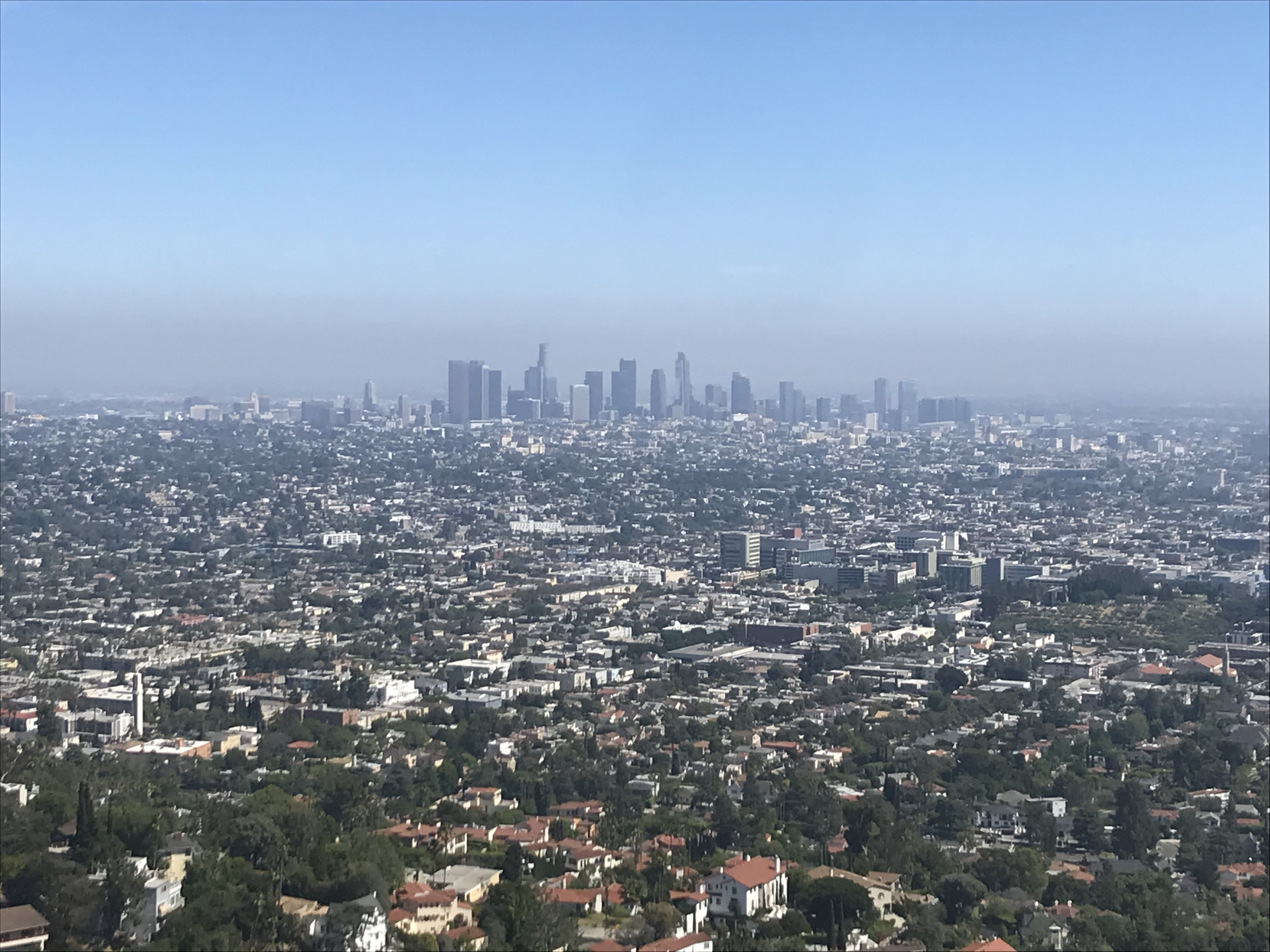
City of Los Angeles

In 2005, the city of Los Angeles went against previous state orders when local officials began allowing agents from federal immigration agencies to enter their jails and investigate the immigration statuses of various suspected inmates. Although Los Angeles County joined forces with the S-Comm program in 2009, the partnership was short-lived when members of the LA County Board withdrew from the 287(g) program altogether in 2015. Not long after, the board signed on with the PEP on the condition that local police authorities would only be required to alert ICE of serious crimes.

In 2011, local police agencies in San Francisco County became the first in California to officially resist ICE's immigration detainer requests. Arrested individuals with minor charges who were also suspected of having illegal immigrant status were promptly released after completing their sentence. This went contrary to ICE's detainer requests, which required that illegal immigrant suspects be held an additional forty-eight hours after their scheduled release.

California Governor Jerry Brown passed and signed the TRUST Act in 2013. This act was passed to prevent local law enforcement agencies from holding onto arrested individuals for federal immigration enforcement agencies, particularly ICE. From now on it would be up to the discretion of California local and state police agencies to decide whether they would comply with ICE detainer requests or not.

== The case ==
=== Gonzalez's arrest ===
Map of California highlighting Los Angeles County

In December 2012, twenty-five-year-old Gerardo Gonzalez Jr. was arrested by the Los Angeles Police Department (LAPD) "on state criminal charges" for being found in possession of methamphetamines. An LAPD officer incorrectly entered his place of birth as Mexico in their booking system. Shortly after his information was entered into the LAPD's system, an ICE agent ran Gonzalez's name through the ICE's connected databases. The LAPD database showed that Gonzalez was born in Mexico and no apparent records indicated he had entered the United States legally. The ICE agent sent a detainer request to the Los Angeles Sheriff's Department (LASD), asking that Gonzalez be held an extra five days after his legally entitled release from LASD custody. When Gonzalez went to pay the $95,000 for his release on bail, he was informed that an immigration detainer had been issued for him and Gonzalez would not be allowed to post the bail.

The database was mistaken. Gonzalez was born in Pacoima, California. He was a natural-born U.S. citizen and had never been eligible for deportation in the first place.

=== ACLU takes the case ===
New ACLU logo 2017

Upon learning of the pending immigration detainer on his case, Gonzalez filed his initial lawsuit against the U.S. government on June 19, 2013. Shortly after this, ICE retracted the detainer from Gonzalez. His first amended complaint was filed with the help of the American Civil Liberties Union (ACLU) on July 10, 2013. Another plaintiff was added to the case, Simon Chinivizyan, a fellow U.S.-born, California resident who also faced the threat of deportation based on ICE's faulty database information. On behalf of Gonzalez and Chinivizyan, the ACLU challenged ICE's methods and practices of issuing immigration detainers. They claimed that ICE's detainers were violations of the Fourth and Fifth Amendments because (1) they issued detainers without probable cause and (2) they interfered with the Due Process Clause.

=== U.S. District Court decision ===
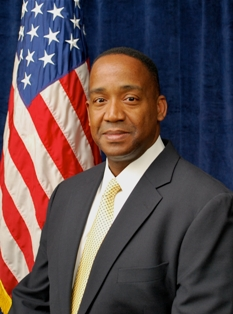
U.S. District Judge André Birotte Jr.

The case was brought before the U.S. District Court Central District of California on February 7, 2018. It was consolidated with another case, Duncan Roy et al. v. County of Los Angeles et al., and presided by U.S. District Judge André Birotte Jr. Upon making his final decision, Birotte declared:

"The LASD officers have no authority to arrest individuals for civil immigration offenses, and thus, detaining individuals beyond their date for release violated the individual's Fourth Amendment rights".

Birotte also ruled that ICE's practice of issuing detainers without warrants was illegal and unconstitutional. A permanent injunction was passed, barring ICE from relying solely on database information to issue detainer requests to local authorities. This ruling essentially canceled all pending ICE detainer requests in Southern California. This would have a serious impact on ICE's organization as one of their main bases, the PERC, was located in Southern California. As a result, the PERC was barred from issuing warrantless detainer requests in California and all other states. The injunction was appealed by the defendants and moved toward the Ninth Circuit Court of Appeals.

=== Ninth Circuit Court of Appeals ruling ===
On September 11, 2020, the case was reviewed before the Ninth Circuit Court judges Milan D. Smith Jr., John B. Owens, and Bridget S. Bade. The court vacated the injunction and sent the case back to the district court for closer review. Furthermore, the court required that more information be gathered regarding the ICE databases and their processes in order to see whether the databases were actually insufficient for issuing warrants based on probable cause.

Two years later on February 17, 2022, ICE conceded to the original injunction ordered by the U.S. District Court. They agreed to the court's terms which stated that the PERC and the Los Angeles ICE office were no longer legally permitted to submit detainer requests based solely on the information from their online databases.

== Legacy ==
Amid continued political controversy surrounding the issue of illegal immigration, the Gonzalez v. ICE ruling raises significant questions and implications for the future role that state and local authorities in enforcing federal immigration policies and procedures. This decision creates a precedent not only for counties in California, but all other states dealing with similar immigration cases.

Gonzalez v. ICE has shown that local police departments can be held liable for honoring warrantless detainer requests, even when issued by federal government agencies. It also reinforced the authority of U.S. federal courts to make decisions regarding the legality of actions conducted by federal agencies.
