= John Sandweg =

American attorney and politician

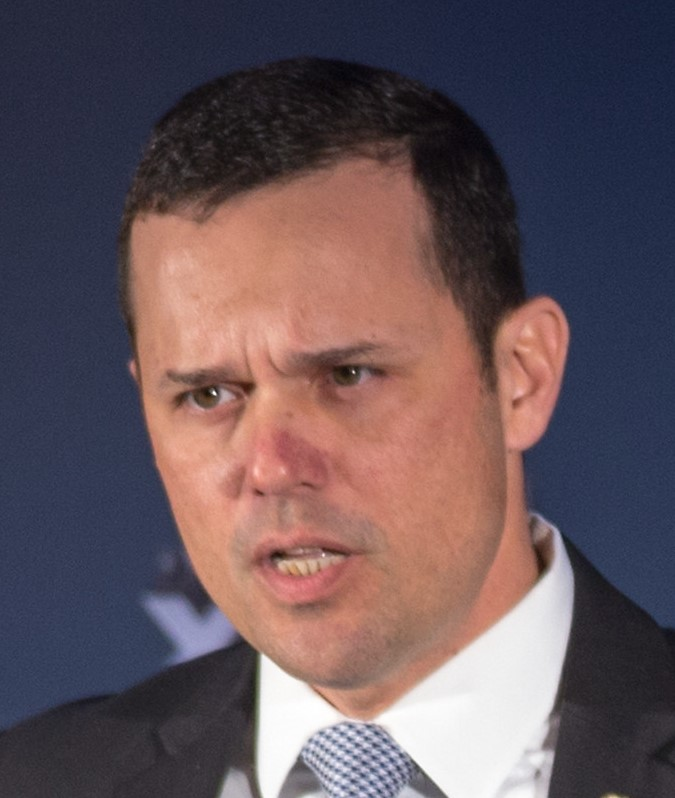

Acting Director of U.S. Immigration and Customs Enforcement
- In office August 1, 2013 – February 21, 2014
- President: Barack Obama
- Preceded by: John T. Morton
- Succeeded by: Thomas S. Winkowski

Personal details
- Born: 1975 (age 50–51)
- Party: Democratic
- Education: Arizona State University (BA, JD)

John R. Sandweg (born 1975) is an American attorney who served as an acting director of U.S. Immigration and Customs Enforcement from August 1, 2013 to February 21, 2014. He is a partner of Nixon Peabody leading the Cross-Border Risks team.

== Biography ==
=== 2002–2009: Defense attorney ===
From 2002 to 2009, Sandweg was a defense attorney at Quarles & Brady LLP. In 2008, he defended Arizona House of Representative Mark DeSimone from accusations of spousal abuse, and had told reporters that he would be resigning. He also raised funds for Janet Napolitano's campaigns in 2009.

=== 2013–2014: U.S. Immigration and Customs Enforcement ===
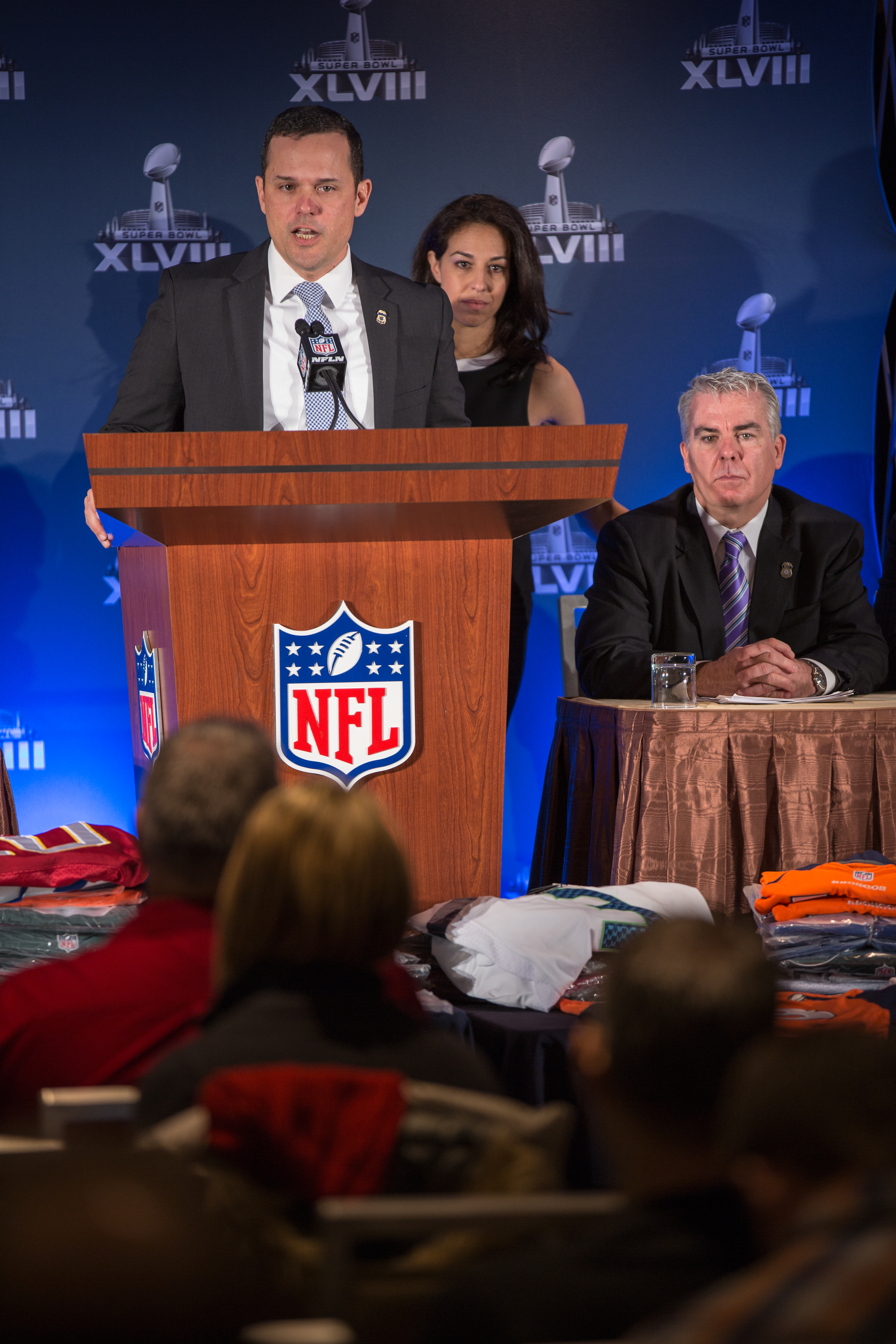
Sandweg speaking at the IPR Press Conference in January 2014.

In August 2013, Sandweg was named as the acting director of U.S. Immigration and Customs Enforcement following the resignation of John T. Morton. The decision was met with criticism, with critics questioning his credentials due to having no experience in law enforcement. In September, Sandweg was probed for pushing Homeland Security Inspector General Charles K. Edwards to stall his report on a scandal involving the U.S. Secret Service.

During his tenure, illegal immigrant removals fell in December 2013, which Sandweg attributed to identifying more criminals and a change in composition for removals. That same month, Senator Chuck Grassley gave security concerns about the EB-5 Immigration Program.

On February 17, 2014, Sandweg resigned from the position with no explanation. He was replaced by Thomas S. Winkowski.

=== 2014–present: Post-ICE and Nixon Peabody ===
In 2017, Sandweg criticized the elimination of the DACA program as it would clog the immigration system. In 2019, Sandweg joined Nixon Peabody as a partner to head the group's cross-border risks practice. In 2020, Sandweg joined doctors, lawyers, asylum-seekers and other former officials for ICE and the Trump administration to release immigrants due to the COVID-19 pandemic. He wanted to release nonviolent detainees to stall the spread of COVID-19. He also criticized Trump for using ICE as his personal "goon squad," and saying that the raids were a failure of leadership in the Trump administration.

During the 2020 Democratic Party presidential primaries, Sandweg criticized Bill de Blasio and Cory Booker after they had pressed Joe Biden on Obama-era policies. During the presidential transition of Joe Biden, Sandweg expressed excitement about how the Biden administration would handle the pandemic and the return of Alejandro Mayorkas after his leave as the United States Deputy Secretary of Homeland Security in 2016. He also praised the fewer arrests and deportations.

As an immigration lawyer in private practice, his clients have included Anna Sorokin; Sandweg said in an interview that he took her case because it demonstrated the government's "overreliance on detention."

Government offices
Preceded by John T. Morton	Acting Director of the U.S. Immigration and Customs Enforcement; August 1, 2013 - February 21, 2014	Succeeded by Thomas S. Winkowski
