= Tae Johnson (government official) =

American law enforcement official

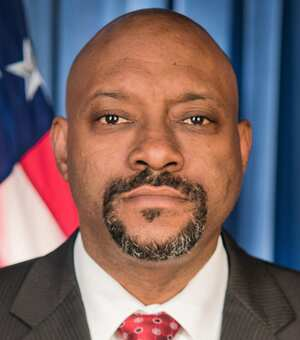

Acting Director of U.S. Immigration and Customs Enforcement (Note: Disputed, the Government Accountability Office contended that Johnson illegally occupied the office)
- In office January 13, 2021 – July 4, 2023
- President: Donald Trump; Joe Biden
- Preceded by: Jonathan Fahey (acting)
- Succeeded by: Patrick Lechleitner (acting)

Deputy Director of U.S. Immigration and Customs Enforcement
- In office 2020 – January 13, 2021
- President: Donald Trump
- Preceded by: Derek Benner
- Succeeded by: Matthew C. Allen (acting)

Personal details
- Education: Salisbury University (BS)

Tae D. Johnson is an American law enforcement official who served as the senior official performing the duties of the director of U.S. Immigration and Customs Enforcement from January 2021 to July 2023. The legality of his status as acting director of U.S. Immigration and Customs Enforcement was disputed.

== Education ==
Johnson earned a Bachelor of Science degree in accounting from Salisbury University.

== Career ==
He began his career in Salisbury, Maryland, working as an officer of the U.S. Immigration and Naturalization Service. On January 13, 2021, Johnson began serving as the senior official performing the duties of the director of U.S. Immigration and Customs Enforcement after the resignation of Jonathan Fahey.

In 2019, Johnson provided testimony to the United States House Committee on Homeland Security.

A February 8, 2023, report from the Government Accountability Office found that Johnson's service "as Acting ICE Director from November 16, 2021, through the present day is in violation of the [Federal Vacancies Reform] Act" as it had exceeded the time limit permitted for officials to serve in an acting capacity and that "any actions taken by Mr. Johnson on or after November 16, 2021, must be nullified or viewed as having no force or effect". The U.S. Department of Homeland Security disagreed with the GAO's conclusion.

Johnson retired at the beginning of July 2023 and was succeeded as acting director by deputy director Patrick J. Lechleitner.

== Notes ==
Government offices
Preceded by Derek Benner	Deputy Director of U.S. Immigration and Customs Enforcement; 2020–2021	Succeeded by Matthew C. Allen; Acting
Preceded by Jonathan Fahey; Acting	Director of U.S. Immigration and Customs Enforcement; Acting; 2021–2023	Succeeded by Patrick Lechleitner; Acting
