= Detainer =

Legal term

Detainer (from detain, Latin detinere); originally in British law, the act of keeping a person against his will, or the wrongful keeping of a person's goods, or other real or personal property. A writ of detainer was a form for the beginning of a personal action against a person already lodged within the walls of a prison; it was superseded by the Judgments Act 1838.

== United States ==
In the United States, a detainer in the context of criminal law is a request filed by a criminal justice agency with the institution in which a prisoner is incarcerated, asking the institution either to hold the prisoner for the agency or to notify the agency when release of the prisoner is imminent. The Supreme Court of the United States has held that the Interstate Agreement on Detainers Act (1970) allows for a trial of any untried indictment, information, or complaint within 180 days. However, the prisoner needs to enter a request for final disposition to begin the clock. U.S. Marshals are given the power to issue writs of detainers in 28 U.S.C. 566(c), which is how the federal government interacts with the states to retrieve those being held in state prisons.

In Carchman v. Nash, the Supreme Court held that a probation revocation (or parole revocation) is not an "untried indictment, information or complaint" and therefore is not controlled by the Interstate Agreement on Detainer Act's 180-day provision. It also made it clear that a case that where a sentence has already been imposed against the prisoner is not under the 180-day restriction. Unfortunately, this often creates loopholes, where a proceeding still needs to go on in the case with the detainer, but the defendant has already pleaded guilty, and is not eligible to receive a final disposition in the case until his original period of incarceration is over. This creates a situation that is the opposite of what the Interstate Agreement was intended to do:

The Agreement is based on a legislative finding that "charges outstanding against a prisoner, detainers based on untried indictments, information or complaints, and difficulties in securing speedy trial of persons already incarcerated in other jurisdictions, produce uncertainties which obstruct programs of prisoner treatment and rehabilitation." Art. I. As has been explained:

"The inmate who has a detainer against him is filled with anxiety and apprehension and frequently does not respond to a training program. He often must be kept in close custody, which bars him from treatment such as trusteeships, moderation of custody and opportunity for transfer to farms and work camps. In many jurisdictions he is not eligible for parole; there is little hope for his release after an optimum period of training and treatment, when he is ready for return to society with an excellent possibility that he will not offend again. Instead, he often becomes embittered with continued institutionalization and the objective of the correctional system is defeated." Council of State Governments, Suggested State Legislation, Program for 1957, p. 74 (1956).

Most states have also enacted laws that create Interstate Commissions, which is usually an agency that creates its own policies and regulations regarding detainers transferring prisoners and probationers across state lines. While the Interstate Agreement on Detainers controls untried cases, Interstate Commission can control whether a person on probation or parole can come to their state to reside.

=== ICE detainers ===
Under the Illegal Immigration Reform and Immigrant Responsibility Act of 1996 (IIRIRA), federal U.S. Immigration and Customs Enforcement agents can issue a detainer requesting a state or local jurisdiction to hold a suspected non-citizen for an additional 48 hours beyond their scheduled release. Although the detainer lapses after 48 hours, and there is no longer legal authority to detain the prisoner, this is frequently disregarded, and attorneys across the United States report that non-citizens are frequently held much longer. In the 2014 case Miranda-Olivares v. Clackamas County, United States magistrate judge Janice M. Stewart of the United States District Court for the District of Oregon ruled that immigration detainers violate detainees' Fourth Amendment rights and are merely requests that are not legally binding. In July 2017, the Massachusetts Supreme Judicial Court unanimously held that the commonwealth's law enforcement could not hold a prisoner solely on the authority of an ICE detainer.

ICE enforcement plans that have issued detainers include Secure Communities and Priority Enforcement Program.

== See also ==
- United States v. Joseph (2019)
