= Caleb Vitello =

American government official

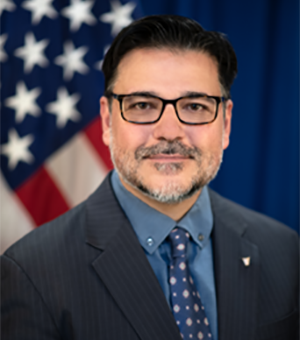
- Official portrait, 2025

Acting Director of U.S. Immigration and Customs Enforcement
- In office January 20, 2025 – February 21, 2025
- President: Donald Trump
- Preceded by: Patrick Lechleitner (acting)
- Succeeded by: Todd Lyons (acting)

Personal details
- Born: Buffalo, New York, U.S.
- Education: University at Buffalo (BS)

Caleb Vitello is an American government official who served as acting director of U.S. Immigration and Customs Enforcement (ICE) from January 20, 2025, until February 21, 2025. He previously served as the assistant director for the Office of Firearms and Tactical Programs of ICE.

== Early life ==
Vitello was born and raised in Buffalo, New York. He holds a Bachelor of Science degree in psychology from the State University of New York at Buffalo.

== Career ==
On December 9, 2024, President-elect Donald Trump named Vitello as his nominee for director of U.S. Immigration and Customs Enforcement. On January 20, 2025, he assumed the role of acting director, succeeding Patrick Lechleitner. On February 21, 2025, the Trump administration removed Vitello as director. The shakeup came in an environment in which Trump wanted to see an increase in the number of deportations. Vitello remained at ICE, overseeing deportation efforts.

Government offices
Preceded by Patrick Lechleitner; Acting	Director of the U.S. Immigration and Customs Enforcement; Acting; 2025	Succeeded by Todd Lyons; Acting
