= Patrick Lechleitner =

American government official

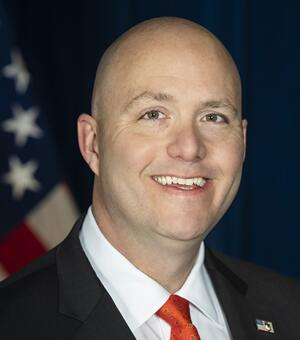
- Official portrait, 2023

Acting Director of U.S. Immigration and Customs Enforcement
- In office July 4, 2023 – January 20, 2025
- President: Joe Biden
- Preceded by: Tae Johnson (acting)
- Succeeded by: Caleb Vitello (acting)

Personal details
- Education: George Mason University (BS); Saint Joseph's University (MS)

Patrick J. Lechleitner is an American former law enforcement officer and government official. He served as acting director of U.S. Immigration and Customs Enforcement (ICE) from July 4, 2023, to January 20, 2025.

== Education ==
Lechleitner is a graduate of Nativity BVM High School in Pottsville, Pennsylvania, northwest of Allentown. He holds a Bachelor of Science degree in psychology from George Mason University in Fairfax, Virginia, a Master of Arts degree in criminology from Saint Joseph's University in Philadelphia, and a graduate certificate in Executive Leadership from American University in Washington, D.C.

== Career ==
Prior to becoming a special agent with the United States Customs Service and then Homeland Security Investigations (HSI) in Philadelphia, Lechleitner was a police officer in Fairfax County, Virginia.

Government offices
Preceded by Tae Johnson; Acting	Director of the U.S. Immigration and Customs Enforcement; Acting; 2023–2025	Succeeded by Caleb Vitello; Acting
