= Jonathan Fahey =

American lawyer

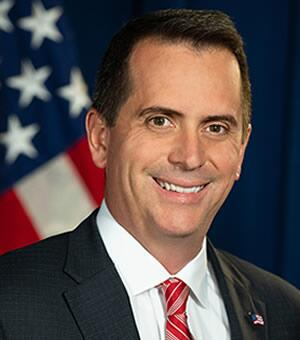

Senior Official Performing the Duties of the Director of U.S. Immigration and Customs Enforcement
- In office December 31, 2020 – January 13, 2021
- President: Donald Trump
- Preceded by: Tony Pham (acting)
- Succeeded by: Tae Johnson (acting)

Personal details
- Party: Republican
- Education: James Madison University (BS); University of San Diego (JD)
- Occupation: Attorney, politician, academic, law enforcement official

Jonathan Fahey is an American attorney, politician, academic, and law enforcement official who served as Deputy Assistant Secretary of the U.S. Department of Homeland Security and later the senior official performing the duties of the director of U.S. Immigration and Customs Enforcement from December 31, 2020, to January 13, 2021.

== Education ==
Fahey earned a Bachelor of Science degree from James Madison University and a Juris Doctor from the University of San Diego School of Law.

== Career ==
After graduating from law school, Fahey worked as a law clerk in Fairfax and Arlington County, Virginia. For 17 years, Fahey served as a federal prosecutor in the United States Attorney's Office for the Eastern District of Virginia. He was the lead prosecutor in the 2014 trial of serial killer Jorge Torrez, a ex-Marine whose case drew significant attention because of the horrific nature of the crimes and because it was a rare case where a defendant was sentenced to death in federal court. In 2015, Attorney General Loretta Lynch awarded Fahey the John Marshall Award for Trial of Litigation for his prosecution of Torrez.

In 2019, Fahey launched an unsuccessful campaign for Commonwealth's Attorney of Fairfax County, running as an Independent.

Fahey served as Deputy Assistant Secretary of the U.S. Department of Homeland Security, later serving as the senior official performing the duties of the director of U.S. Immigration and Customs Enforcement from December 31, 2020, to January 13, 2021. He resigned 7 days after the 2021 storming of the United States Capitol and was succeeded by Tae Johnson.

In 2021, Fahey won a dismissal in federal court in a high-profile police shooting case in federal court after successfully arguing that the case violated the Supremacy Clause of the United States Constitution. Fahey has served as an adjunct professor at the American University Washington College of Law and at George Washington University Department of Forensic Science. As of February 2024, he was a partner in the Washington, D.C. office of the law firm Holtzman Vogel Baran Torchinsky & Josefiak, PLLC, known as Holtzman Vogel. He frequently appears on Fox News and Fox Business to comment on current events, legal and political issues.

Government offices
Preceded by Tony Pham; Acting	Senior Official Performing the Duties of the Director of U.S. Immigration and Customs Enforcement; 2020–2021	Succeeded by Tae Johnson; Acting
