= John P. Torres =

American government official

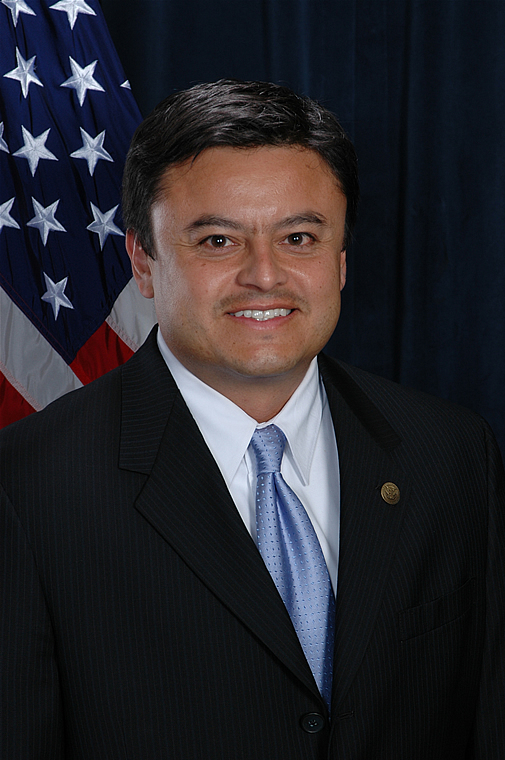

Assistant Secretary of Homeland Security for Immigration and Customs Enforcement
- Acting
- In office November 17, 2008 – May 12, 2009
- President: George W. Bush; Barack Obama
- Preceded by: Julie L. Myers
- Succeeded by: John T. Morton (as Director)

John P. Torres is a former government official, once acting assistant secretary of homeland security for U.S. Immigration and Customs Enforcement (ICE). He was appointed on November 17, 2008.

== Early career ==
Torres began his law enforcement career with the former Immigration and Naturalization Service (INS) in 1986. Early in his career, Torres was a member of an undercover investigative unit in Los Angeles. In 1992 during the Los Angeles riots, he was assigned to duty at the Newton and Rampart Divisions of the Los Angeles Police Department.

In 1999, Torres was designated the INS investigative lead for the railway serial killer investigation of Rafael Resendez-Ramirez in Texas. In 1997, Torres was assigned to the FBI Headquarters International Terrorism Operations Section, and later designated as the first INS Special Agent in the Osama bin Laden Unit. In that capacity, he managed investigations of the East Africa embassy bombings, the millennium attack plot to bomb Los Angeles International Airport and other sites, the Khobar Towers bombing, and the plot to bomb American airliners over the Pacific Ocean.

Torres also developed the Law Enforcement Support Center in Burlington, Vermont.

== Career at ICE ==
From March to November 2008, John Torres was the Deputy Assistant Secretary for Operations for U.S. ICE. In this capacity, Torres was responsible for coordinating the efforts of the Office of Federal Protective Service (FPS), the National Firearms and Tactical Training Unit, the National Incident Response Unit, the Office of Detention and Removal Operations (DRO), the Office of Intelligence, the Office of International Affairs, the Office of Investigations (OI), and the Office of State and Local Coordination.

From June 2005 to March 2008, John Torres was the Director of the Office of Detention and Removal Operations for ICE within the Department of Homeland Security. In his capacity as Director, Torres oversaw an authorized workforce of more than 6,700 employees, including nearly 6,000 sworn law enforcement officers assigned to 24 field offices nationwide, managed an operating budget of over $2 billion, ended the practice of "catch and release" and transitioned the Criminal Alien Program from the Office of Investigations to DRO. In Fiscal Year 2007, DRO removed over 282,000 foreign nationals; eliminated more than 140,000 fugitive cases from the fugitive backlog; issued 164,296 charging documents through the Criminal Alien Program; and expanded detention capacity to 27,500 from 18,500 in Fiscal Year 2005.

Torres previously served as Deputy Assistant Director for Smuggling and Public Safety in ICE Office of Investigations, where he oversaw the implementation of ICE's anti-gang initiative Operation Community Shield, the ICE Mutual Agreement between Government and Employers (IMAGE) program, and the establishment of ICE's Document and Benefit Fraud task forces. He previously served as the Special Agent-in-Charge of the Newark ICE office, where he oversaw ICE's participation in several major multi-agency investigations, including an international child pornography investigation resulting in the arrests of over 2,000 people; and an undercover investigation involving the purchase of surface-to-air missiles from arms brokers for the purpose of downing American airliners.

Government offices
Preceded by Julie Myers	Assistant Secretary for U.S. Immigrations and Customs Enforcement; November 17, 2008 - May 12, 2009	Succeeded by John T. Morton
