= David Venturella =

American former law enforcement officer (born 1965/1966)

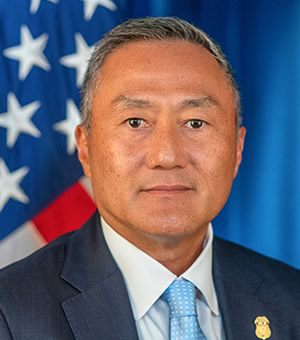
- Official portrait, 2026

Acting Director of United States Immigration and Customs Enforcement
- Incumbent
- Assumed office June 1, 2026
- President: Donald Trump
- Deputy: Charles Wall
- Preceded by: Todd Lyons (acting)

Personal details
- Born: 1965 or 1966 (age 60–61)
- Education: Bradley University (BS)

David J. Venturella (born 1965 or 1966) is an American former law enforcement officer who has served as the acting director of United States Immigration and Customs Enforcement since June 1, 2026.

== Early life ==
David J. Venturella was born in 1965 or 1966. Venturella is the son of an immigrant. He attended Bloom Trail High School. Venturella graduated from Bradley University with a Bachelor of Science.

== Career ==
=== Immigration enforcement (1986–2012) ===
Venturella began working in immigration enforcement in 1986. By December 1996, he had become a spokesman for the United States Immigration and Naturalization Service in Chicago. By January 1997, he was the acting director of the service's district office in Chicago and was the acting deputy director of the office by March.

Venturella had transferred to the Immigration and Naturalization Service's headquarters as an assistant commissioner for detention and deportation by August 1999. A Cuban prisoner whose flight to Cuba was redirected to Louisiana sued several officials, including Venturella, over the incident in April 2000. After the Immigration and Naturalization Service was abolished in 2003, Venturella became an assistant director of the Office of Detention and Removal Operations within Immigration and Customs Enforcement. He later became the office's director. By August, Venturella had left the agency.

By October 2008, Venturella had become the executive director of the Secure Communities program. He had left that position by November 2011. By April 2012, he had transferred to a position overseeing Immigration and Customs Enforcement's field offices.

=== Private sector (2012–2025) ===
In 2012, Venturella joined the GEO Group to oversee business development. He later served as the senior vice president of client relations. Venturella left the GEO Group in 2023, but continued serving as a paid consultant until 2025.

=== Immigration and Customs Enforcement advisorship (2025–present) ===
Following the 2024 presidential election, Tom Homan, whom President-elect Donald Trump had named to serve as his border czar, expressed interest in appointing Venturella to lead Trump's immigration enforcement operation. Venturella's work for the GEO Group elicited concerns that an appointment would violate federal law and invite controversy over Immigration and Customs Enforcement's connections to the company. Venturella joined Immigration and Customs Enforcement as an advisor in February 2025.

In March 2026, The New York Times reported that in June 2025, Venturella had requested that ICE deport the Brazilian ex-girlfriend of Paolo Zampolli, a Trump ally, at Zampolli's request. In July, Venturella became the deputy official overseeing a division that manages contracts for immigrant detention centers.

== Acting Director of Immigration and Customs Enforcement ==
On May 12, 2026, the Department of Homeland Security announced that Venturella would succeed Todd Lyons as the acting director of United States Immigration and Customs Enforcement.

== Works cited ==
- Waslin, Michele (November 2011). "The Secure Communities Program: Unanswered Questions and Continuing Concerns" (PDF). Immigration Policy Center.

Government offices
Preceded by Todd Lyons; Acting	Director of U.S. Immigration and Customs Enforcement; Acting; 2026–present	Incumbent
