= Thomas S. Winkowski =

US Immigration and Customs official

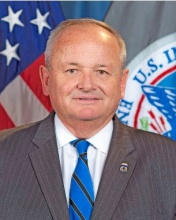

Acting Director of U.S. Immigration and Customs Enforcement
- In office March 16, 2014 – December 23, 2014
- President: Barack Obama
- Preceded by: John Sandweg (acting)
- Succeeded by: Sarah R. Saldaña

Personal details
- Born: June 8, 1954 (age 72)
- Education: Northeastern University

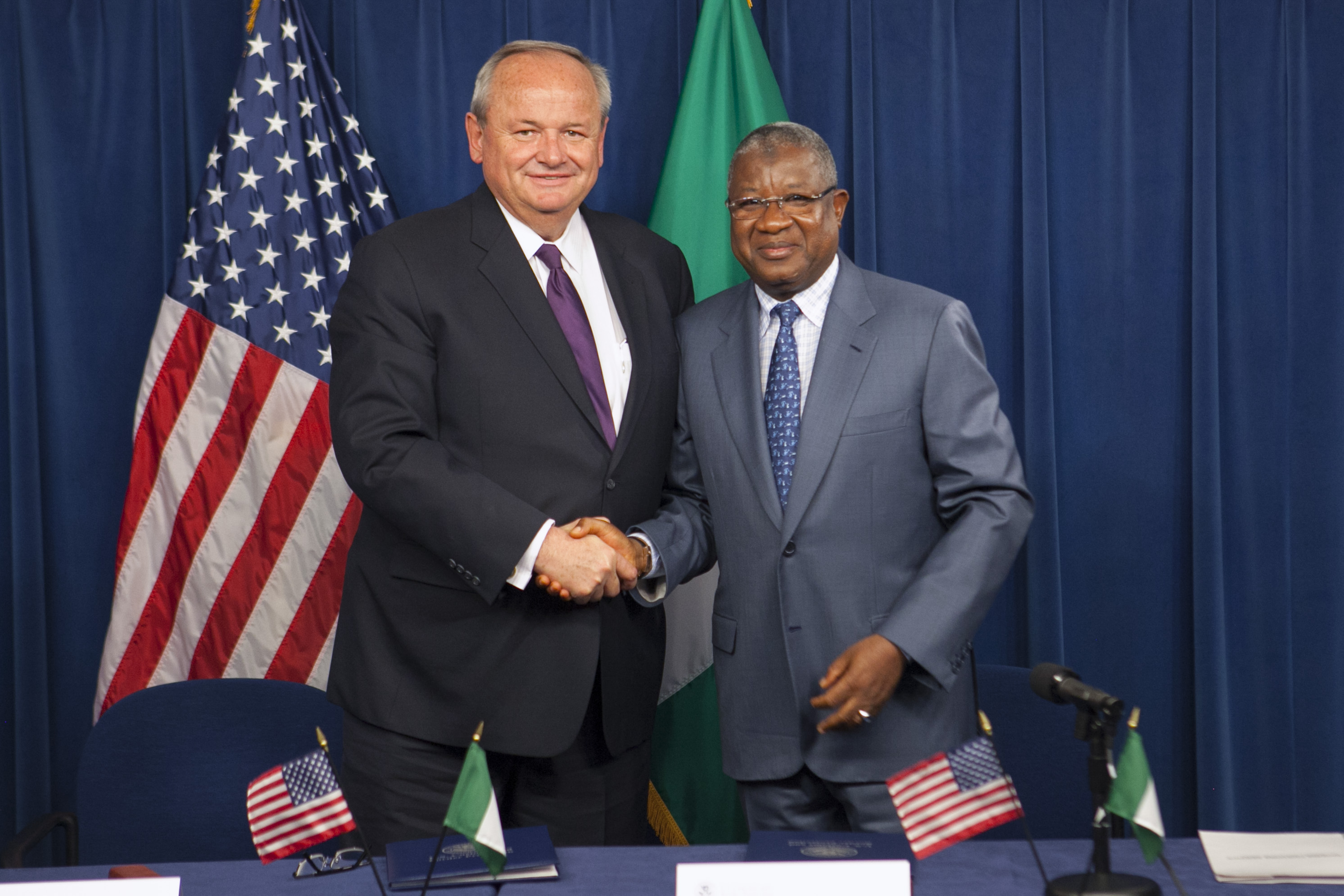
Winkowski (left)

Thomas S. Winkowski (born 1954) is a retired former Principal Deputy Assistant Secretary for U.S. Immigration and Customs Enforcement (ICE). He was previously Acting Commissioner of U.S. Customs and Border Protection (CBP). Winkowski has been awarded the Meritorious Presidential Rank Award by President George W. Bush in 2004 and the Distinguished Executive Presidential Rank Award by President Barack Obama in 2009. He was the acting director of ICE until 2014.

Government offices
Preceded by John Sandweg	Director of the U.S. Immigration and Customs Enforcement; March 16, 2014 - December 23, 2014	Succeeded by Sarah Saldaña
