= Madison Sheahan =

American politician (born 1997)

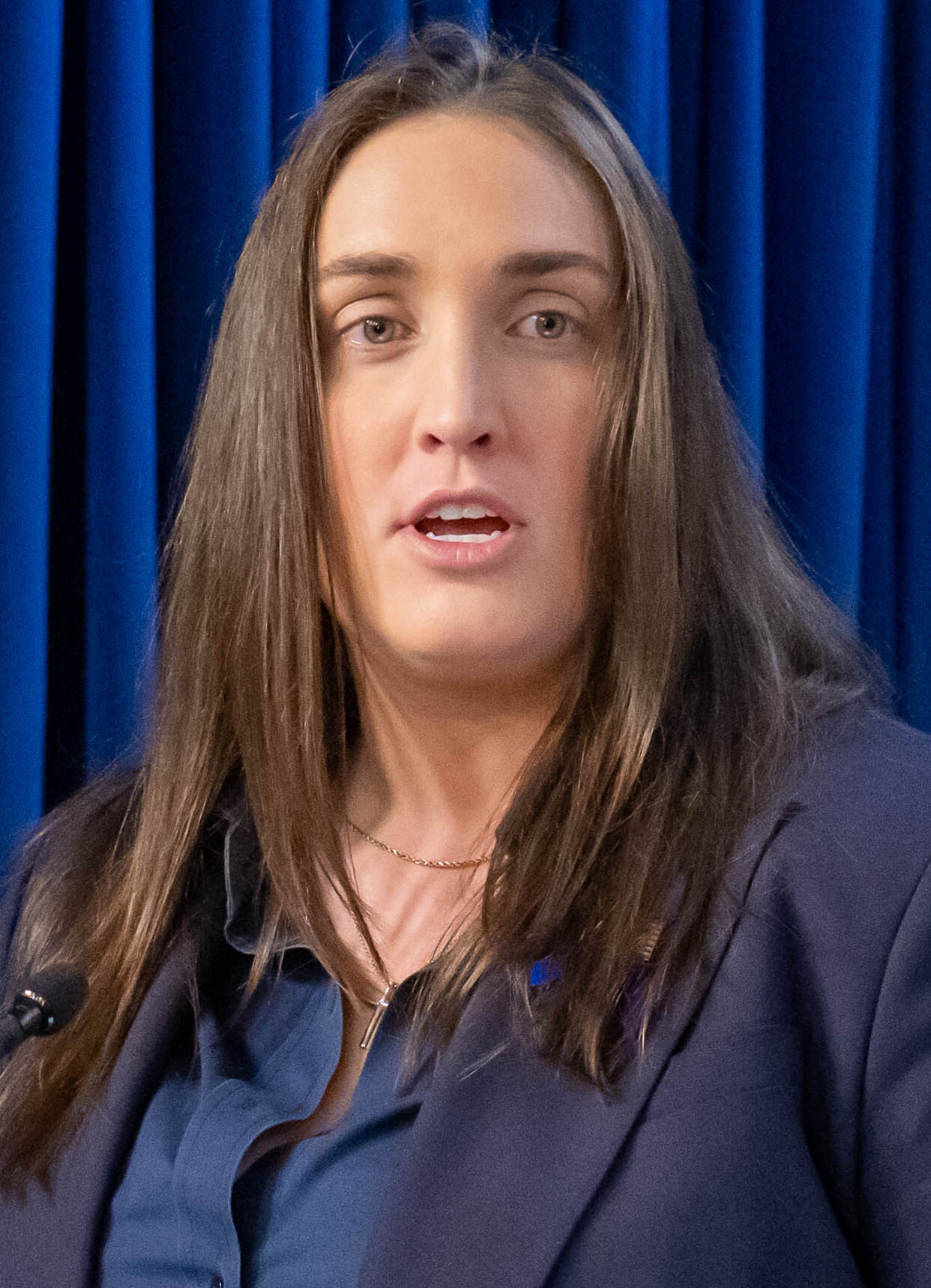
- Sheahan in 2025

Deputy Director of U.S. Immigration and Customs Enforcement
- In office March 9, 2025 – January 15, 2026
- President: Donald Trump
- Preceded by: Kenneth Genalo (acting)
- Succeeded by: Charles Wall

Secretary of the Louisiana Department of Wildlife and Fisheries
- In office January 8, 2024 – March 9, 2025
- Governor: Jeff Landry
- Preceded by: Robert Shadoin
- Succeeded by: Tyler Bosworth

Personal details
- Born: February 9, 1997 (age 29) Curtice, Ohio, U.S.
- Party: Republican
- Education: Ohio State University (BA)

Madison Dean Sheahan (born February 9, 1997) is an American government official who served as the deputy director of U.S. Immigration and Customs Enforcement (ICE) from March 2025 to January 2026.

== Early life and education ==
Sheahan was born to Laura (Lafferty) and Roger Sheahan on February 9, 1997. She grew up in Curtice, Ohio, and attended Genoa Area High School, graduating in 2015.

Sheahan attended Ohio State University from 2016 through 2019 where she was a member of the women's rowing team that won two Big Ten Championship titles. Sheahan graduated from Ohio State University in 2019 with a bachelor's degree in public affairs from the John Glenn College of Public Affairs.

== Career ==
=== State career ===
Sheahan worked with then-governor Kristi Noem as her political director from February 2021 to January 2024. She was the executive director of the South Dakota Republican Party from January 2023 to January 2024.

Sheahan served as the secretary of the Louisiana Department of Wildlife and Fisheries under Governor Jeff Landry from January 2024 until March 2025. During this time, she created a special operations group to assist enforcement efforts during events like Mardi Gras and the Super Bowl, partnering with the Louisiana State Police. That group responded during the 2025 New Orleans truck attack.

=== Federal career ===
In March 2025, Homeland Security Secretary Kristi Noem announced that Sheahan would be the deputy director of ICE.

On January 15, 2026, Sheahan announced she would be resigning as deputy director.

=== 2026 congressional bid ===
Sheahan indicated in social media posts that she was leaving Homeland Security to run for Ohio's 9th congressional district in the May 2026 Republican primary election. The seat is considered one of the Republican's prime targets, seeking to unseat incumbent Democrat Marcy Kaptur. During the primary Sheahan was targeted for the deaths of Renee Good and Alex Pretti and her connections to Kristi Noem. Donald Trump did not make an endorsement in the primary. She lost to former state representative Derek Merrin who had been the candidate in 2024, coming in third place with 11,501 votes or 20.21% of the electorate.

Government offices
Preceded by Kenneth Genalo; Acting	Deputy Director of U.S. Immigration and Customs Enforcement; 2025–2026	Succeeded by Charles Wall
