= Director of United States Immigration and Customs Enforcement =

Government Official

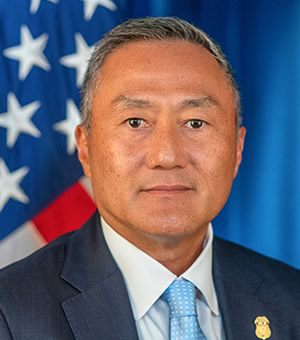
- Incumbent; David Venturella; Acting since June 1, 2026
- United States Immigration and Customs Enforcement
- Reports to: United States Secretary of Homeland Security
- Seat: 500 12th Street SW; Washington, D.C., U.S.
- Appointer: The president with Senate advice and consent
- Constituting instrument: 6 U.S.C. § 113
- Formation: March 11, 2003; 23 years ago Prior to July 2010 titled Assistant Secretary
- Deputy: Deputy Director
- Website: www.ice.gov

The director of United States Immigration and Customs Enforcement (ICE) is a civilian official in the United States Department of Homeland Security. During July 2010 the position's title was changed from Assistant Secretary for U.S. Immigrations and Customs Enforcement.

The director is in charge of the day-to-day operations of more than 7,000 Homeland Security Investigations (HSI) agents that are the primary investigative component of ICE and 6,000 enforcement and removal operations officers (ERO). ICE is an agency with the United States Department of Homeland Security and the director reports to the United States secretary of homeland security and the United States deputy secretary of homeland security.

This position requires Senate confirmation, though an acting director is permitted, and the agency has not had a confirmed director since January 20, 2017. The current acting director is David Venturella.

== Overview ==
The director of Immigration and Customs Enforcement is the chief administrator with enforcement of US immigration laws and criminal investigations of transnational criminal organizations. This mission is executed through the enforcement of more than 400 federal statutes and focuses on immigration enforcement, preventing terrorism and combating the illegal movement of people and goods.

== Officeholders ==
†- Indicates title of office upon appointment was Assistant Secretary for U.S. Immigrations and Customs Enforcement

No.	Portrait	Deputy secretary	Took office	Left office	Time in office	Party	President
1	Michael J. Garcia†	Michael J. Garcia† (born 1961)	March 11, 2003	September 5, 2005	2 years, 178 days	Republican	George W. Bush (R)
-	John P. Clark†	John P. Clark†; Acting	September 6, 2005	January 3, 2006	119 days	Independent	George W. Bush (R)
2	Julie Myers†	Julie Myers† (born 1969)	January 4, 2006	November 14, 2008	2 years, 315 days	Republican	George W. Bush (R)
-	John P. Torres†	John P. Torres†; Acting	November 17, 2008	May 12, 2009	176 days	Independent	George W. Bush (R); Barack Obama (D)
3	John T. Morton†	John T. Morton† (born 1966)	May 12, 2009	July 31, 2013	4 years, 111 days	Independent	Barack Obama (D)
-	John Sandweg	John Sandweg (born 1975); Acting	August 1, 2013	February 21, 2014	229 days	Democratic	Barack Obama (D)
-	Thomas S. Winkowski	Thomas S. Winkowski (born 1954); Acting	March 16, 2014	December 23, 2014	282 days	Independent	Barack Obama (D)
4	Sarah Saldaña	Sarah Saldaña (born 1951)	December 23, 2014	January 20, 2017	2 years, 28 days	Independent	Barack Obama (D)
-	Daniel Ragsdale	Daniel Ragsdale; Acting	January 20, 2017	January 30, 2017	10 days	Independent	Donald Trump (R)
-	Tom Homan	Tom Homan (born 1961); Acting	January 30, 2017	June 29, 2018	1 year, 150 days	Independent	Donald Trump (R)
-	Ronald Vitiello	Ronald Vitiello (born 1963); Acting	June 30, 2018	April 12, 2019	256 days	Independent	Donald Trump (R)
-	Matthew Albence	Matthew Albence; Acting	April 13, 2019	May 27, 2019	44 days	Independent	Donald Trump (R)
-	Mark A. Morgan	Mark A. Morgan (born 1965/1966); Acting	May 28, 2019	July 5, 2019	38 days	Independent	Donald Trump (R)
-	Matthew Albence	Matthew Albence; Acting	July 5, 2019	August 25, 2020	1 year, 51 days	Independent	Donald Trump (R)
-	Tony Pham	Tony Pham (born 1973); Acting	August 25, 2020	December 31, 2020	128 days	Republican	Donald Trump (R)
-	Jonathan Fahey	Jonathan Fahey; Acting	December 31, 2020	January 13, 2021	13 days	Republican	Donald Trump (R)
-	Tae Johnson	Tae Johnson; Acting	January 13, 2021	July 4, 2023	2 years, 172 days	Independent	Donald Trump (R); Joe Biden (D)
-	Patrick Lechleitner	Patrick Lechleitner; Acting	July 4, 2023	January 20, 2025	1 year, 200 days	Independent	Joe Biden (D)
-	Caleb Vitello	Caleb Vitello; Acting	January 20, 2025	February 21, 2025	32 days	Independent	Donald Trump (R)
-	Todd Lyons	Todd Lyons; Acting	March 9, 2025	May 31, 2026	1 year, 83 days	Independent	Donald Trump (R)
-	David Venturella	David Venturella; Acting	June 1, 2026	Incumbent	98 days	Independent	Donald Trump (R)

== See also ==
- Chief, IRS Criminal Investigation
- Director of the Central Intelligence Agency
- Director of the Federal Bureau of Investigation
- Director of the United States Marshals Service
- Director of the United States Secret Service
- Federal law enforcement in the United States
