= Julie Myers =

American prosecutor (born 1969)

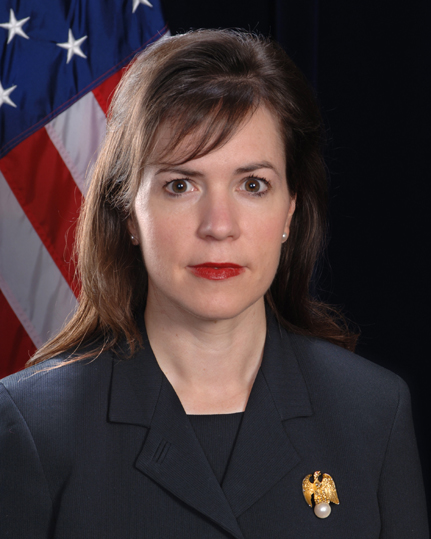

Assistant Secretary for U.S. Immigrations and Customs Enforcement
- In office January 4, 2006 – November 14, 2008
- President: George W. Bush
- Preceded by: Michael J. Garcia
- Succeeded by: John T. Morton

Personal details
- Born: Julie Lyn Myers; July 12, 1969 (age 57) Missouri, US
- Party: Republican
- Spouse: John F. Wood
- Children: 2
- Education: Baylor University; Cornell Law School

Julie Lyn Myers Wood (born 1969) is an American prosecutor and former government official. She was the assistant secretary for U.S. Immigration and Customs Enforcement. She assumed the job following a recess appointment by President George W. Bush on January 4, 2006. Previously, Myers worked for the Office of Independent Counsel under Kenneth Starr and was a lead prosecutor in the Independent Counsel's failed case against Susan McDougal.

After leaving the Office of Independent Counsel, Myers was appointed Assistant Secretary for Export Enforcement at the Department of Commerce. In that capacity, she oversaw 170 employees and a $25 million budget for one year. She is currently the CEO of Guidepost Solutions, an investigative and compliance consulting firm.

Myers is married to John F. Wood, the former US Attorney for the Western District of Missouri and former Chief of Staff to the secretary of homeland security. She is also the niece of former chairman of the Joint Chiefs, Richard Myers.

== Assistant secretary ==
On June 30, 2005, Myers was nominated by President George W. Bush to lead the Immigration and Customs Enforcement (ICE) agency. On September 15, she testified in front of the Senate's Homeland Security and Governmental Affairs Committee. The committee approved Myers' nomination on a strict party-line vote (with Republicans voting for the nomination). The full Senate never voted on the nomination and President Bush gave her a recess appointment on January 4, 2006, which remained in effect until January 3, 2007. He renominated her on January 9, 2007. Despite some criticism and controversy, Myers was confirmed by the Senate on December 19, 2007.

On November 5, 2008, the day after the election of Barack Obama, then-secretary of homeland security Michael Chertoff announced the resignation of Myers effective November 15. Myers was succeeded by ICE deputy assistant secretary for operations John P. Torres, a career ICE employee.

== Criticism ==
Because the head of ICE is required by law to have at least five years of legal and management experience, three senators (George V. Voinovich, Ohio; Susan Collins, Maine; and Joseph I. Lieberman, Connecticut) expressed concerns that Myers lacked sufficient law enforcement experience. Significant criticism came from conservative commentators, including The National Review, which urged President Bush to nominate a candidate with more experience.

Myers was criticized for some of the methods used by ICE agents during worksite enforcement raids they conducted while she was the head of ICE, including subjecting people to interrogation and denying access to bathrooms without an escort. Myers responded that the methods used were legal, citing a 1984 Supreme Court ruling.

Myers also presided over many instances of alleged and reported abuse by ICE at numerous detention centers across the country. For example, Hiu Lui Ng died of cancer in 2008 while in detention, having not been allowed medical treatment and experiencing brutal treatment at the hands of ICE employees. As one inquiry found, guards would drag Ng along the floor when he was not physically able to walk.

== Controversy ==
On Halloween in 2007, Myers hosted a costume party for ICE employees in which she was a judge. They awarded a top costume prize to a white Homeland Security Department employee dressed as an escaped Jamaican prisoner wearing a prison jumpsuit, dreadlocks and blackface. Although Myers issued an apology after employees complained the costume was racist and inappropriate, she had been photographed smiling with the costumed employee in question. Under Myers, the employee was temporarily transferred from the agency headquarters to a field office, and an attempt was allegedly made to delete the photographs. The photographs, however, were not permanently deleted and the House Committee report featured the shot of Myers smiling with the employee as evidence.

Initially, Homeland Security Secretary Michael Chertoff dismissed criticism of Myers. However, her nomination was delayed. A report by the United States House Committee on Homeland Security ruled that Myers led a "coordinated effort to conceal" her role in the scandal.

Government offices
Preceded by John P. Clark	Assistant Secretary for U.S. Immigrations and Customs Enforcement; January 4, 2006 - November 14, 2008	Succeeded by John P. Torres
