= Charles Wall (US official) =

U.S. Immigration and Customs Enforcement official

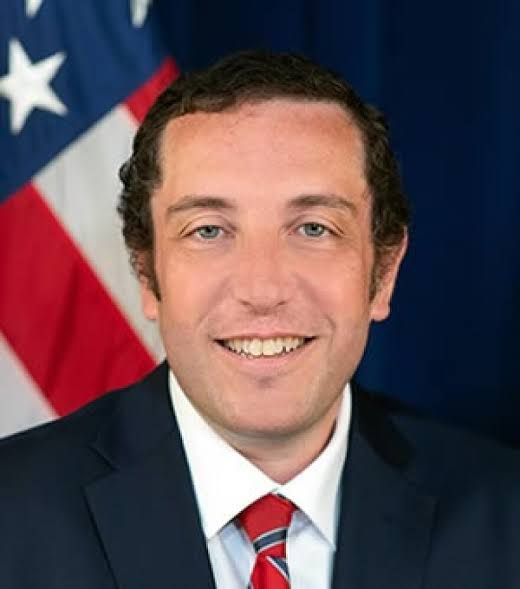
- Official portrait, 2026

Deputy Director of U.S. Immigration and Customs Enforcement
- Incumbent
- Assumed office January 15, 2026
- President: Donald Trump
- Preceded by: Madison Sheahan

Charles Wall is an American government official serving as the deputy director of U.S. Immigration and Customs Enforcement (ICE) since January 2026.

== Early life and education ==
Wall was raised in New Orleans, Louisiana. He attended Jesuit High School.

Wall attended the University of New Orleans for undergraduate and Tulane University Law School for his Juris Doctor.

== Career ==
From 2009 to 2012, he was a prosecutor and senior assistant district attorney in the Orleans Parish District Attorney's Office, Louisiana.

Wall has worked for ICE since 2012.

=== Second Trump administration ===
In 2025, Wall served as ICE's Principal Legal Advisor. On January 15, 2026, U.S. Department of Homeland Security secretary Kristi Noem announced Wall's appointment as deputy director of ICE.

Government offices
Preceded by Madison Sheahan	Deputy Director of U.S. Immigration and Customs Enforcement; 2026–present	Incumbent
