= John T. Morton =

American government official (born 1966)

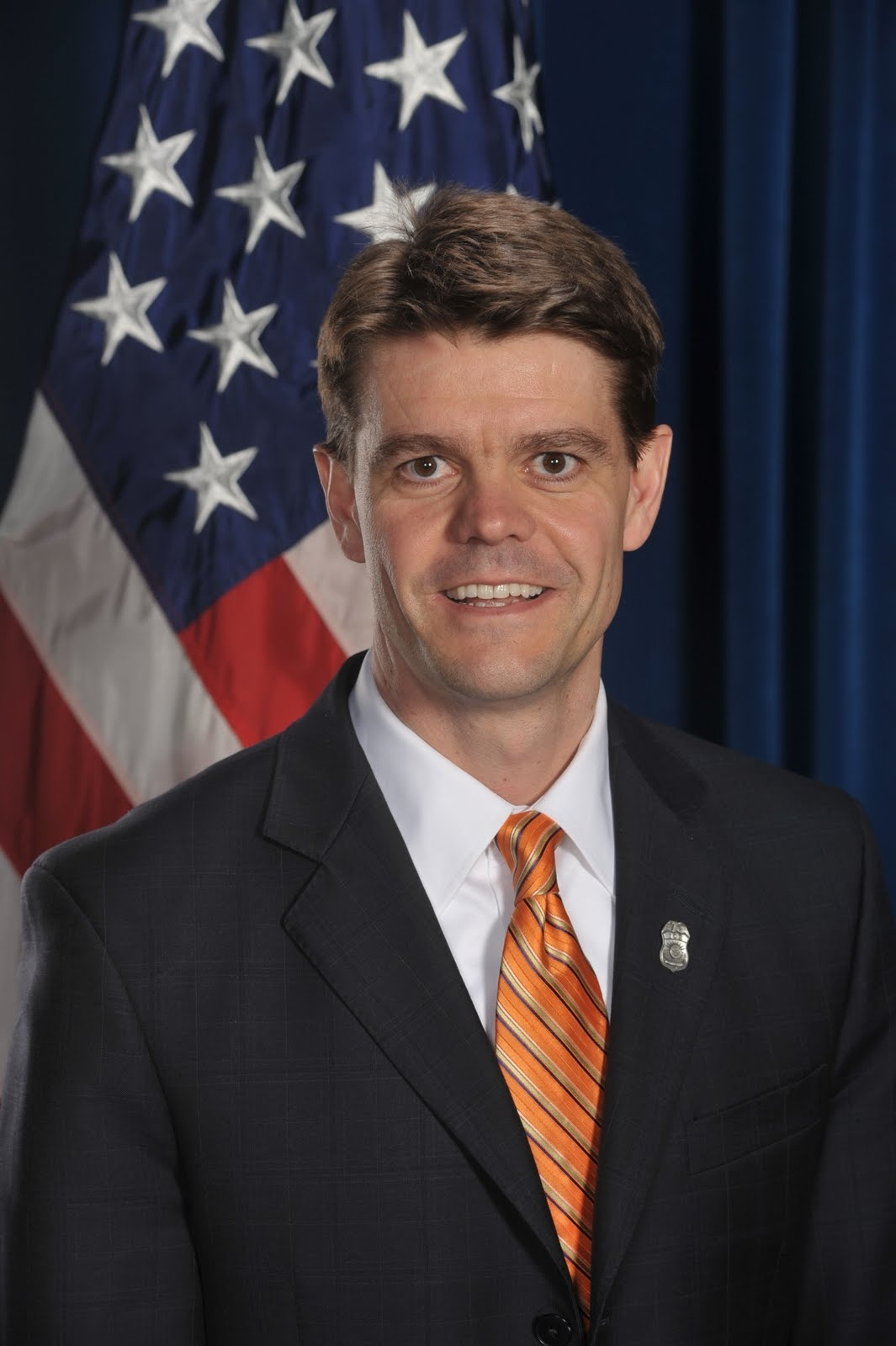

Assistant Secretary for U.S. Immigrations and Customs Enforcement
- In office May 12, 2009 – July 31, 2013
- President: Barack Obama
- Preceded by: Julie Myers
- Succeeded by: Sarah Saldaña

Personal details
- Born: John Templeton Morton; 1966 (age 59–60) Inverness, Scotland
- Education: University of Virginia (BA, JD)

John T. Morton (born 1966) is a former American government official who served as the Assistant Secretary for U.S. Immigration and Customs Enforcement (ICE) from 2009 to 2013. Morton was appointed unanimously by the U.S. Senate on May 12, 2009. Morton stepped down from ICE in July 2013 and currently works as the Chief Compliance and Ethics Officer at Capital One, a bank with headquarters in Virginia.

== Background ==
Morton was born to an American father and British mother and raised in Loudoun County, Virginia. He graduated from Episcopal High School before attending the University of Virginia (UVA) for a bachelor's degree in English and history and the University of Virginia Law School for his JD. He served in the Peace Corps between his schooling at UVA. He worked for the Department of Justice for 15 years prior to being appointed Director of ICE.

== Philosophy ==
In an interview conducted shortly after his appointment, Morton emphasized a need for moderation:

And you're putting people in jail, and that's good work but it's also awesome work. I mean your actions lead to somebody going to jail. So I think, you know, the way to look at Government service is as a great honor and privilege... As a Government employee, balanced perspective is critical, trying to reach the common good is critical. You're not an extreme advocate. Your job is to try to get it right, and that's a very rewarding and satisfying position to be in.

== Morton's ICE ==
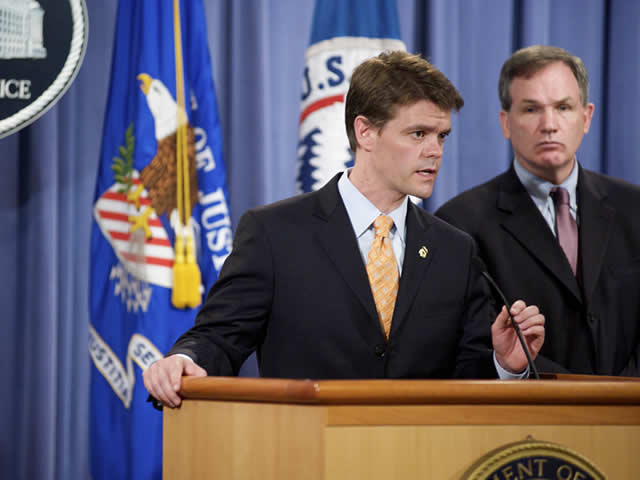
John T Morton at a 2009 Drug Trafficking Press Conference

One of Morton's first acts in office was an expansion of I-9 audits. These were applied to over 650 businesses suspected of employing undocumented workers.

Morton also expressed dissatisfaction at ICE's reliance on state and local prisons to house detainees, stating: "Immigration detention is a civil function, it is not a penal function. Over the years, however, the system has largely become dependent on excess jail space." Under his leadership, ICE constructed a new detention center in Karnes County, Texas. Morton called the new detention facility "sensible, sustainable and attentive to the unique needs of the individuals in our custody".

== Political response ==
Because he worked on controversial issues, Morton complained of criticism from the right and the left. "I can get criticized on the same issue from both sides on the same day," he said in 2010.

== Personal life ==
Morton is married and has four daughters.

Government offices
Preceded by John P. Torres	Assistant Secretary for U.S. Immigrations and Customs Enforcement; May 12, 2009 - July 31, 2013	Succeeded by John Sandweg
