= 2020 deployment of federal forces in the United States =

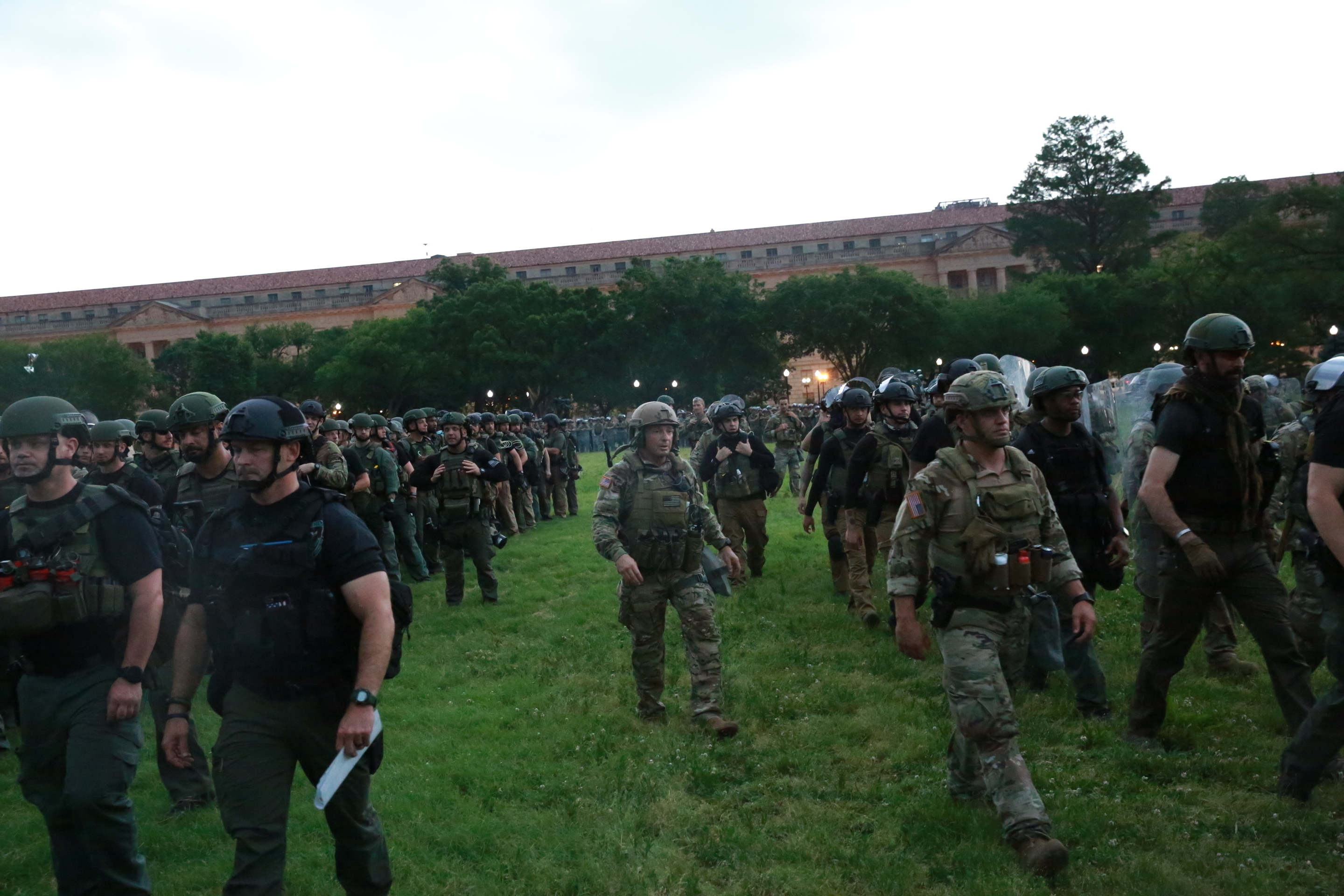
Top: Federal Bureau of Prisons SORT personnel–many lacking identifying insignia–and National Guardsmen of the 19th Special Forces Group in Washington, D.C., June 2020.
Bottom: Federal agents in body armor and camouflage detain a masked person before placing him in an unmarked van in Portland, Oregon, July 2020.

In June 2020, the Trump administration began deploying federal law enforcement forces to some cities in the United States in response to rioting and monument removals amid the George Floyd protests. Federal law enforcement elements were deployed under Operation Legend, Operation Diligent Valor, and the Protecting American Communities Task Force (PACT). The Department of Homeland Security (DHS) cited an executive order regarding "monuments, memorials and statues" as allowing federal officers to be deployed without the permission of individual U.S. states, as the federal government "has the right to enforce federal laws, investigate crimes and make arrests" within states.

On June 1, 2020, in Washington, D.C., federal law enforcement deployed riot control tactics and munitions against protesters to expand a security perimeter, which allowed President Donald Trump to walk from the White House to St. John's Episcopal Church, Lafayette Square for a brief photo op. Days later, anonymous federal personnel in tactical and riot gear began to appear on D.C. streets; many refused to identify themselves. In July 2020, federal forces were deployed in Portland, Oregon, as part of the PACT, where their use of unmarked cars and officers in camouflage without clear identification badges generated outrage. DHS officials defended the use of unmarked vehicles and unidentified officers in camouflage; acting DHS deputy secretary Ken Cuccinelli said, "Unmarked police vehicles are so common it's barely worth discussion" and that officers wore the same uniforms and equipment each day, so demonstrators could nevertheless identify them.

Federal details were also deployed to Kansas City and Seattle. DHS had plans to send 150 agents to Chicago and President Trump had threatened future deployments to other cities "run by liberal Democrats," including Oakland, California, and New York. According to a Government Accountability Office report released in September 2020 and based on self-reported data, tactical teams from 16 federal agencies were deployed to multiple cities in May and June alone, including Los Angeles, San Diego, and San Francisco, CA; Denver, CO; Washington, DC; Miami, FL; Detroit and Port Huron, MI; St. Louis, MO; Buffalo and New York City, NY; Dallas, El Paso, Houston, and Pearland, TX; and Seattle and Tacoma, WA.

The deployment was met with lawsuits, rebukes, and concerns over constitutionality. In May 2021, Trump's successor Joe Biden revoked the executive order that allowed for federal prosecution of individuals that vandalized federal monuments.

== Aerial surveillance ==
By June 19, 2020, the Department of Homeland Security had logged "at least 270 hours of surveillance" captured via airplanes, drones, and helicopters above demonstrations in 15 cities protesting police violence and the murder of George Floyd. Reportedly, some footage was sent in real time to Air and Marine Operations control centers and fed from there to the so-called "Big Pipe", a digital network enabling other federal agencies and local police to access it.

=== Congressional responses ===
On June 5, 2020, Democrats on the House Oversight Committee wrote Acting DHS Secretary Chad Wolf, expressing concern about surveillance and intimidation via Predator drones and the anticipated use of Customs and Border Protection (CBP) and Immigration and Customs Enforcement (ICE) personnel, and asking for data on surveillance and deployment. On June 9, over 30 members of Congress also voiced concerns to FBI Director Wray, National Guard Bureau Chief General Lengyel, DEA Acting Administrator Shea, and CBP Acting Commissioner Morgan about the surveillance of protesters, demanding that they cease.

== Founding of PACT ==
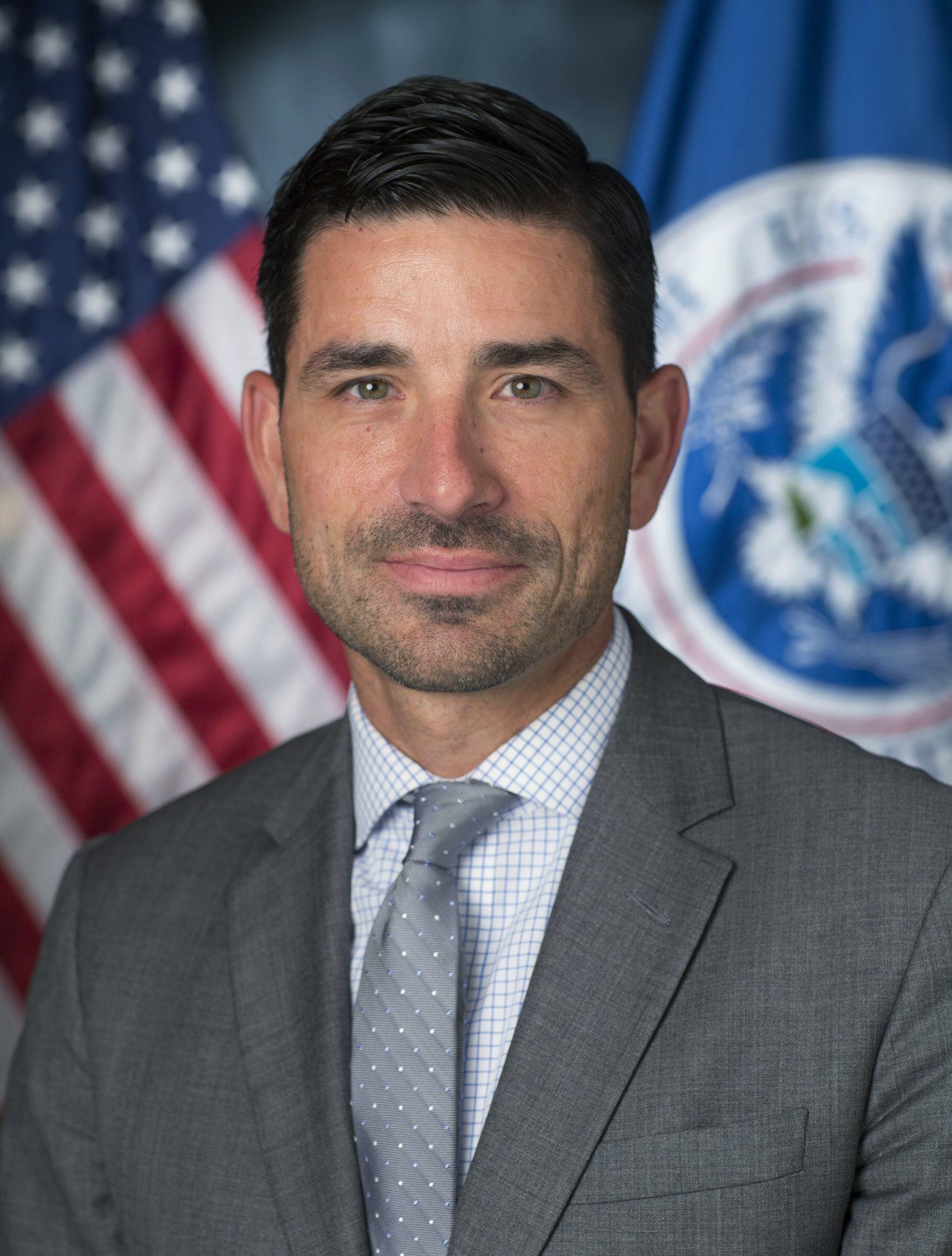
Chad Wolf was promoted to Acting Secretary of Homeland Security in 2019.

On June 26, 2020, in response to a wave of monument and memorial removals across the country during the George Floyd protests, President Donald Trump issued Executive Order 13933, Protecting American Monuments, Memorials, and Statues and Combating Recent Criminal Violence, announcing that the federal government would (1) prosecute anyone vandalizing or desecrating public monuments, memorials, and statues; government property; or religious property; (2) prosecute anyone inciting related violence; and (3) withhold federal support from local and state governments that failed to protect such structures from vandalism. The executive order also stated that if the Secretary of the Interior, the Secretary of Homeland Security, or the Administrator of General Services requested federal personnel "to assist with the protection of Federal monuments, memorials, statues, or property," they shall be provided by the Department of Defense, the Department of Justice, and/or the Department of Homeland Security (DHS). The order was interpreted as allowing federal officers to be deployed without the permission of individual U.S. states.

The Department of Homeland Security created the Protecting American Communities Task Force (PACT) to coordinate its response, including assessing any potential unrest and deploying personnel to protect structures. Acting DHS Secretary Chad Wolf stated that the task force would not "...stand idly by while violent anarchists and rioters seek not only to vandalize and destroy the symbols of our nation, but to disrupt law and order and sow chaos in our communities." PACT would partner with the Justice Department and the Department of Interior to share information. Other departments that would potentially coordinate with the task force were the Federal Protective Service, U.S. Secret Service, Immigration and Customs Enforcement, Customs and Border Protection and the Transportation Security Administration.

According to an internal memo, the DHS Office of Intelligence and Analysis received authorization to engage in domestic surveillance to protect against "threats to damage or destroy any public monument, memorial, or statue".

Executive Order 13933 was revoked by President Joe Biden in May 2021.

== Timeline ==
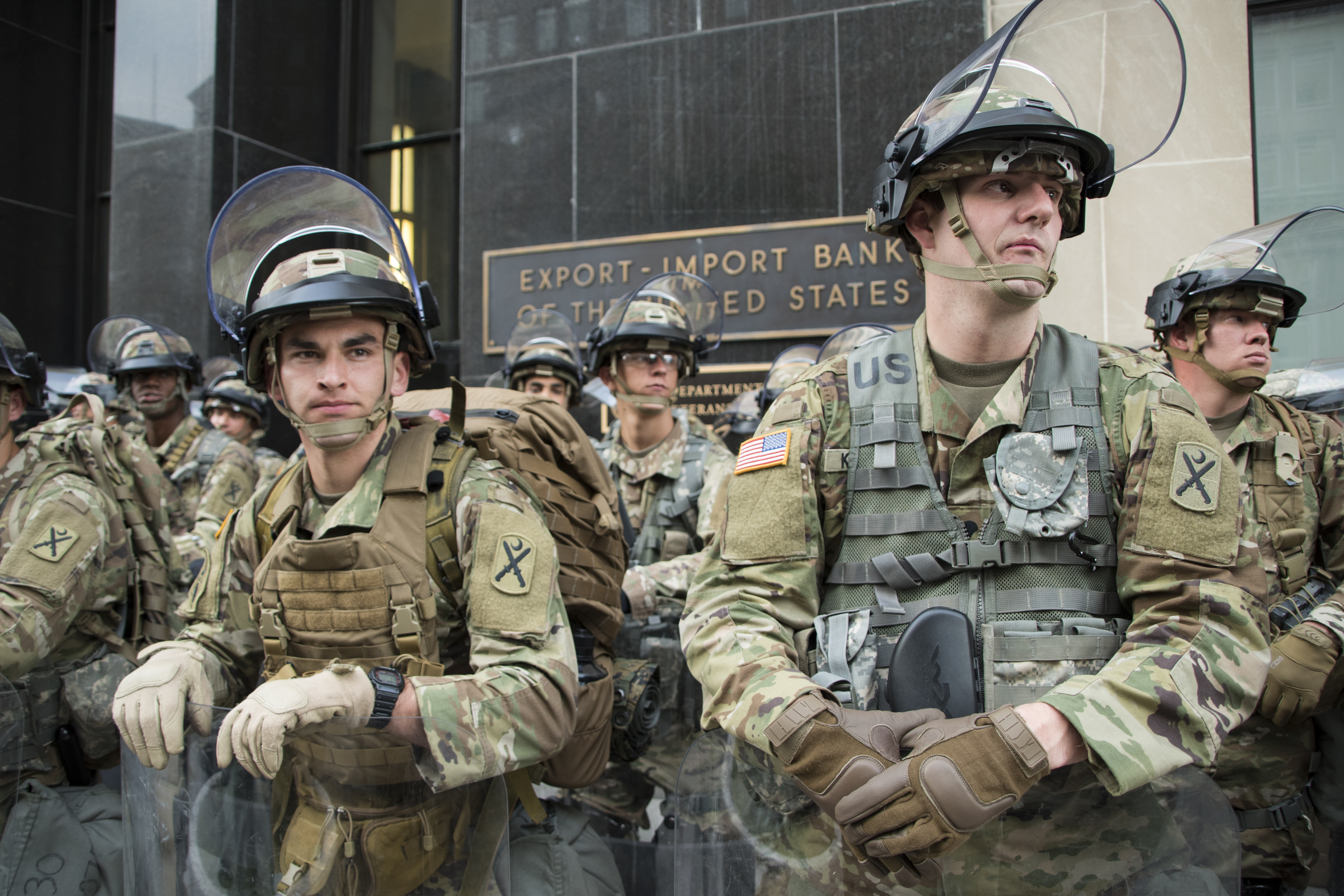
South Carolina and D.C. National Guard at the Lafayette Building in Washington, D.C., on June 3, 2020

- May 31 – The New York Times reports recent protests in Washington, D.C., led to President Donald Trump entering the White House bunker
- June 1 – Clergy and protesters are forcefully dispersed in anticipation of presidential photo-op at St. John's Church in Washington, D.C.
- June 3 – Journalists first report presence of anonymous law enforcement agents in Washington, D.C.
- June 26 – Executive Order 13933 is issued by President Trump
- July 8 – Operation Legend begins
- July 11 – Protester Donavan La Bella shot in the head with a projectile fired by federal agents in Portland
- July 15 – At least two individuals are apprehended by anonymous agents and placed into unmarked vans in Portland
- July 18 – Navy veteran Chris David assaulted by anonymous agents in Portland
- July 22 – Trump announces deployment of forces under Operation Legend to Chicago and Albuquerque
- July 25 – Protests against the deployment of federal forces occur in Seattle
- July 30 – The Trump administration and the governor of Oregon reach a deal to draw-down deployed federal agents and fulfill their role using state and local police
- May 14, 2021 – Executive Order 13933 is revoked by President Joe Biden

== Activities in Washington, D.C. ==
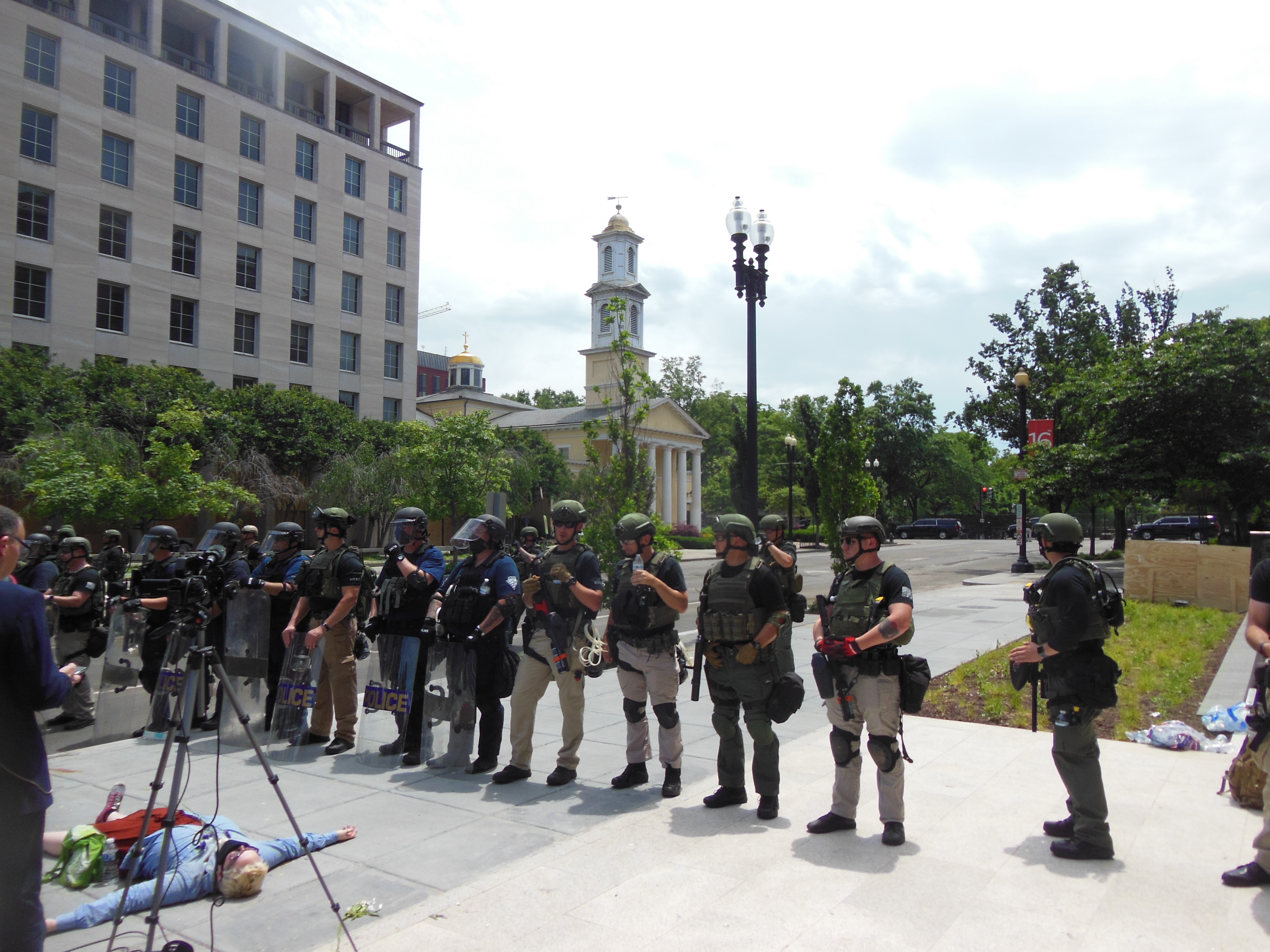
Federal law enforcement deployed in Washington, D.C., without identifying insignia, June 2020. Many were later identified as Federal Bureau of Prisons Special Operations Response Team (BOP SORT) personnel.

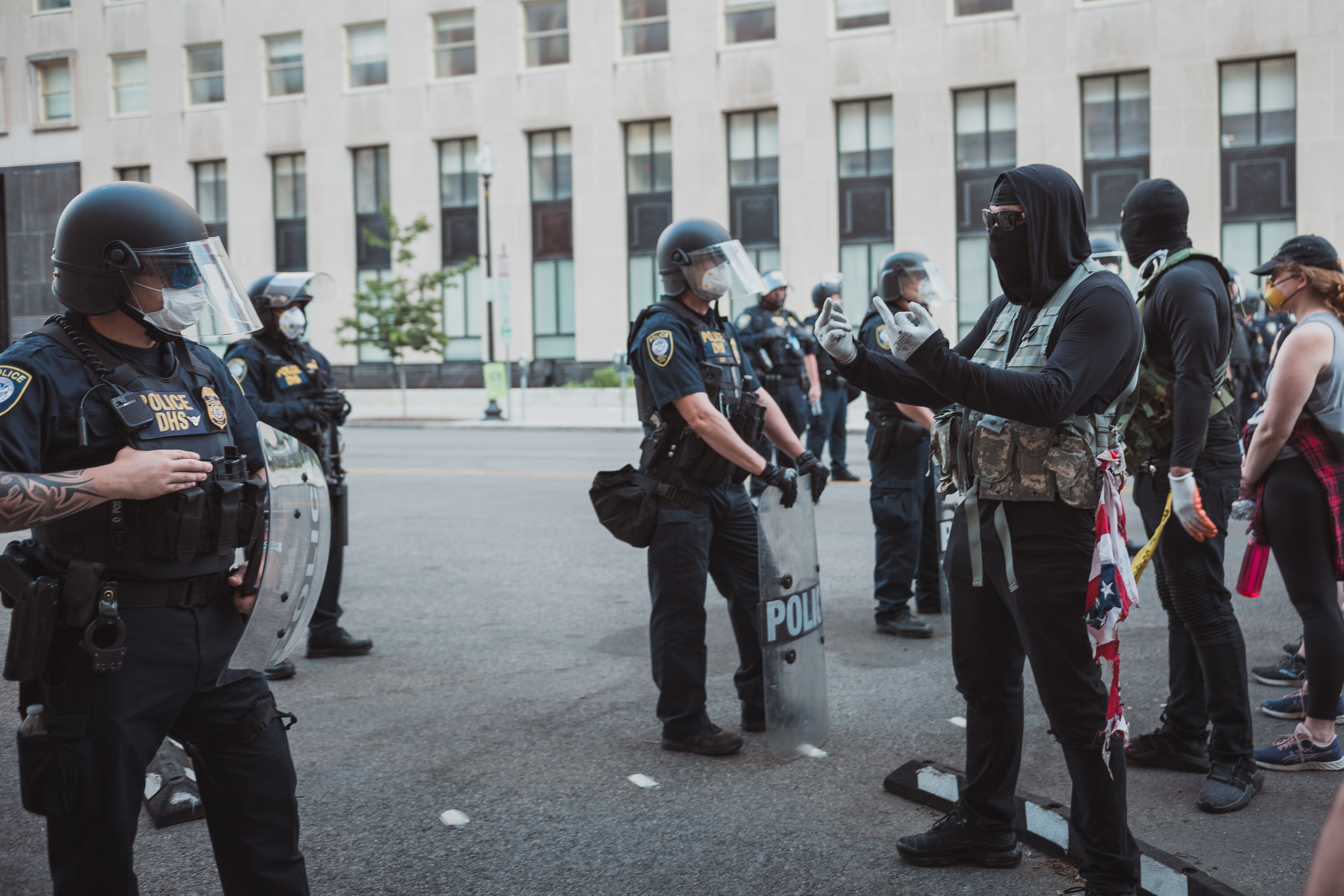
Protesters confront Federal Protective Service officers in Washington, D.C., on June 2, 2020

On June 1, 2020, amid the George Floyd protests in Washington, D.C., security forces deployed tear gas and other riot control tactics to clear Lafayette Square and surrounding streets to allow for the installation of fencing. Later, Trump and senior administration officials walked from the White House to St. John's Episcopal Church for a photo op. Just before visiting the church, Trump delivered a speech urging state governors to quell violent protests by using the National Guard to "dominate the streets", or he would otherwise "deploy the United States military and quickly solve the problem".

A number of law enforcement agencies were involved in the clearing operation, including personnel from the U.S. Park Police (USPP), U.S. Secret Service, Federal Bureau of Prisons, Arlington County Police Department, U.S. Marshals Service, Drug Enforcement Administration (DEA), Federal Bureau of Investigation (FBI), and Bureau of Alcohol, Tobacco, Firearms and Explosives (ATF). D.C. National Guard Military Police were present but did not participate.

On June 3, armed and camouflaged individuals were seen patrolling the streets of Washington, D.C. wearing anti-riot gear. The individuals refused to identify themselves to journalists. A representative of the National Guard later identified the individuals as employees of the Bureau of Prisons.

=== Lawsuits and investigations ===
Three days after the Lafayette Square clearing, a group of protesters and Black Lives Matter D.C., represented by the American Civil Liberties Union (ACLU) and Lawyers' Committee for Civil Rights Under Law, filed a federal lawsuit against Trump and Attorney General William Barr, claiming they conspired to violate, and did violate, their constitutional rights under the First and Fourteenth Amendments. Other officials, including Defense Secretary Mark Esper and Secret Service Director James M. Murray, were also named as defendants.

A second lawsuit was filed by three protesters on June 11 against law enforcement and Trump administration officials asserting that the forced removal represented a "gross abuse of executive power" that violated their First, Fourth and Fifth Amendment rights.

On June 22, Mark Greenblatt, Inspector General for the United States Department of the Interior, launched an investigation into the June 1 event following requests from several lawmakers. On July 23, Michael Horowitz, the Department of Justice Inspector General, announced that he was investigating the role of the Department of Justice and its law enforcement personnel in responding to protests in Washington during the previous two months, "examining the training and instruction that was provided to the DOJ law enforcement personnel; compliance with applicable identification requirements, rules of engagement, and legal authorities; and adherence to DOJ policies regarding the use of less-lethal munitions, chemical agents, and other uses of force.” He added that he would coordinate with Inspector General Greenblatt's office on the Lafayette Square investigation.

=== Reactions ===
The clearing of demonstrators from Lafayette Square was widely condemned as excessive and an affront to the First Amendment right to freedom of assembly by religious leaders and former military leaders, among others. D.C. Attorney General Karl A. Racine referred to Trump's actions as that of a "tyrannical president".

Following the event, Speaker of the House of Representatives Nancy Pelosi and Senate Democratic Leader Chuck Schumer issued a joint statement, reading in part, "at a time when our country cries out for unification, this President is ripping it apart."

== Activities in Portland, Oregon ==
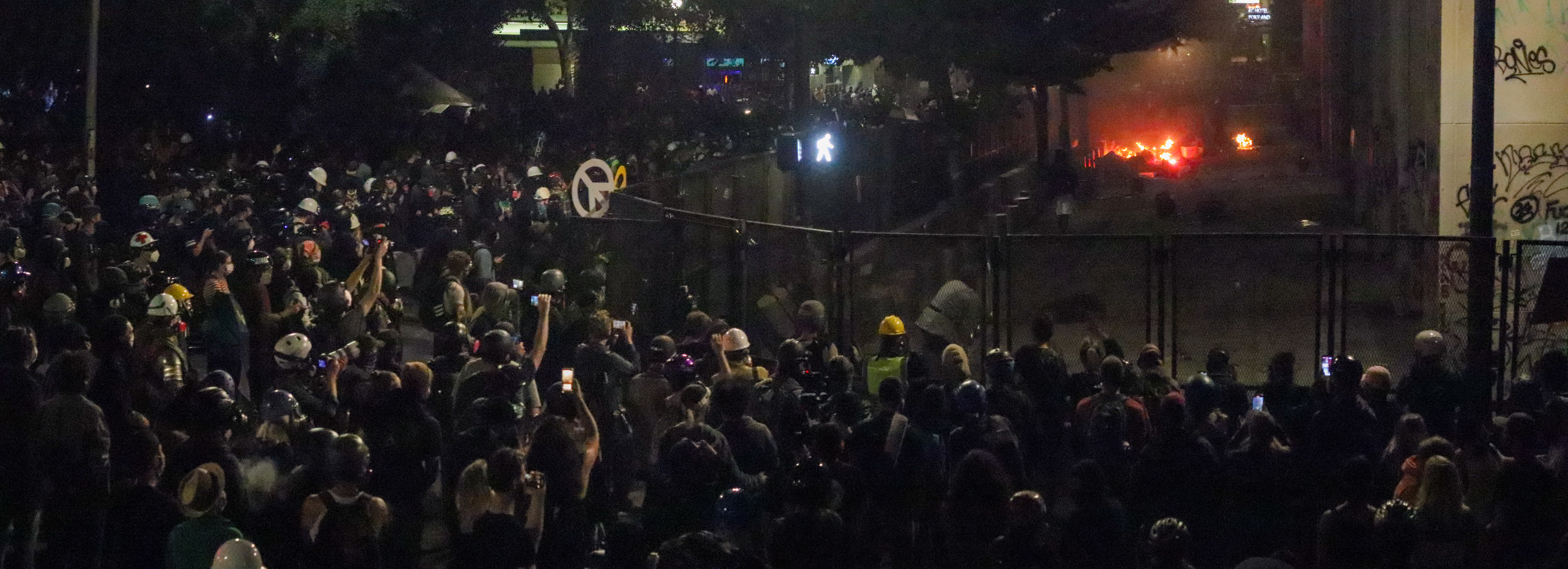
Protesters surround the Mark O. Hatfield federal courthouse in Portland, Oregon on July 22, 2020

At the start of July, forces from the Department of Homeland Security (DHS), the U.S. Marshal Service, U.S. Customs and Border Protection (CBP), and the Federal Protection Service arrived in Portland, appearing at the U.S. courthouse, where they fired pepper spray or tear gas at protesters who got too close to the building. According to an article published by the Washington Post, some White House officials claimed that Trump became interested in federal operations against the protesters as a means of underscoring his law-and-order message, with the sources accusing the White House of wanting "to amplify strife in cities," and positing that the deployment was "about getting viral online content." The DHS referred to its deployment in Portland as Operation Diligent Valor.

Protester Donavan La Bella was shot in the head with a projectile fired by federal agents in Portland on July 11. He suffered facial injuries and skull fractures, requiring reconstructive surgery. On the same day, a man hit a federal agent in the head and shoulder with a hammer and was arrested.

External videos
- BLM protests: Local officials criticise federal agent presence in Portland, BBC News
- Portland's mayor tear gassed by federal agents, CBC News

In the early hours of July 15, protester Mark Pettibone was walking home from a protest in Portland when an unmarked minivan stopped. A friend who had been walking with him recorded on videotape as multiple armed individuals clad in camouflage jumped out of the van; they apprehended Pettibone without identifying themselves or stating a reason for their actions. According to Pettibone, the camouflage-clad individuals placed him in the unmarked van and blindfolded him using his own beanie hat. Pettibone says the van then drove around in the city and took him to a building that he later learned after his release was the federal courthouse. There he was photographed, searched, placed in a cell, and Mirandized. Pettibone declined questioning and invoked his right to an attorney; he was released about 90 minutes later. He said he was not given any written record of his arrest or citation for any alleged crime. The U.S. Marshals Service issued a statement denying their agency was involved in Pettibone's apprehension, but U.S. Customs and Border Protection later acknowledged that its agents were involved.

On July 15, video was recorded showing several unidentified armed individuals wearing camouflage fatigues physically apprehending another demonstrator and taking him away in an unmarked van. On July 18, the Portland Tribune filmed federal agents as they repeatedly struck and pepper sprayed a protester while he stood "as solidly as a rock". Chris David, a 54-year-old graduate of the United States Naval Academy and former Navy officer clad in Navy apparel, was a newcomer to the protest, reportedly drawn by recent stories of "kidnappings" by militarized federal agents. According to David, he approached federal agents and asked them how their actions squared with their oath to the Constitution. At that point, he was struck five times by double-handed blows from clubs, causing multiple broken bones and requiring surgery.

On July 21 Richard Cline, deputy director of the Federal Protective Service, told reporters that three officers had suffered eye injuries when protesters deliberately aimed lasers at their eyes, and that the officers "may not recover sight in those eyes". The report was later repeated by White House Press Secretary Kayleigh McEnany, blaming "so-called peaceful protesters". Contradicting McEnany's claims of permanent blindness, Acting Deputy Secretary Cuccinelli later testified that all officers recovered full vision within hours or days.

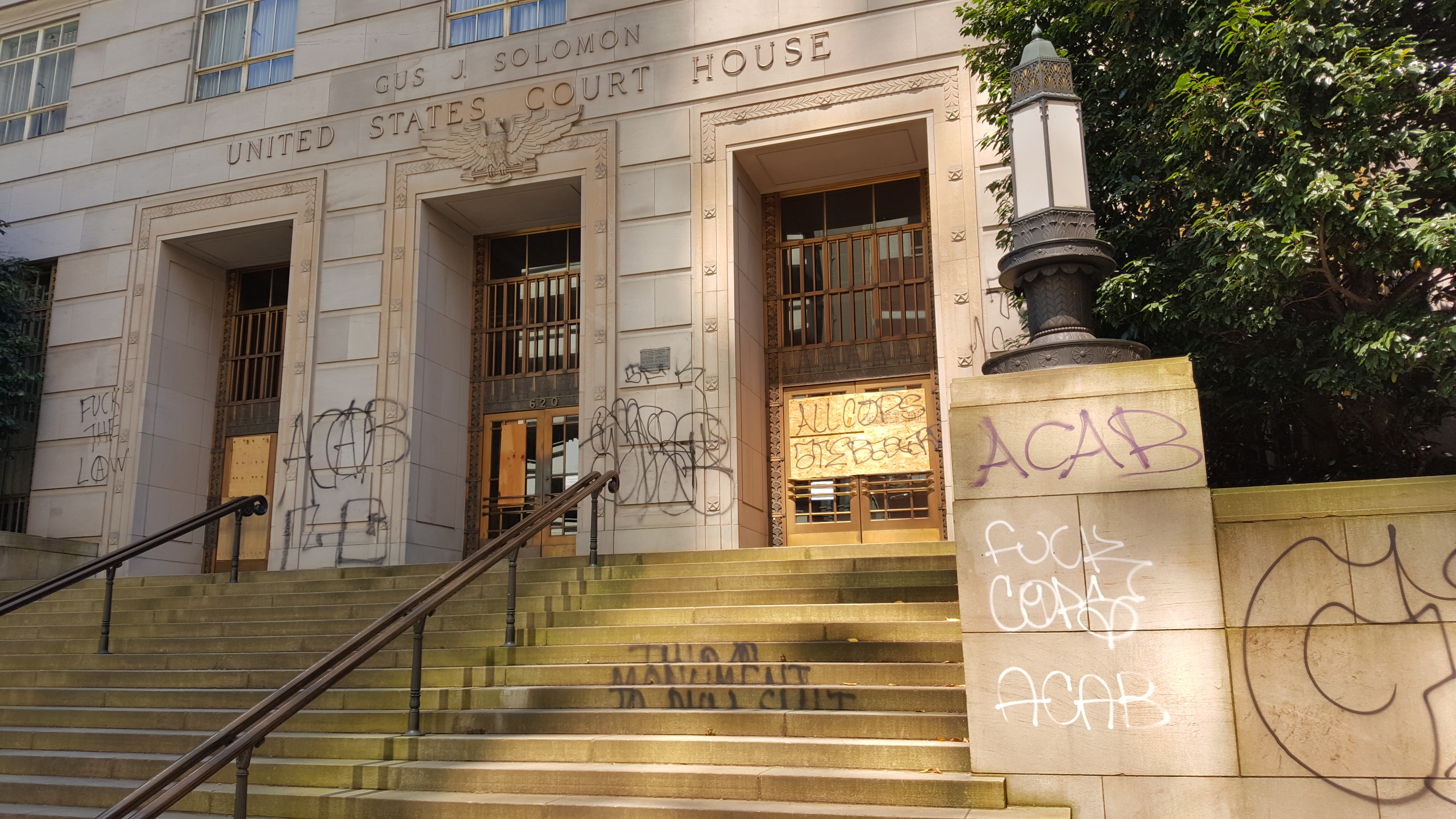
The defaced Gus J. Solomon federal courthouse in Portland, Oregon on July 25, 2020

On July 22, Portland mayor Ted Wheeler traveled to the protest site to address the assembled crowds and engage in a "listening session". Wheeler's session was interrupted when he was tear gassed by federal agents.

On July 27, the Trump administration announced that additional federal agents would be sent to reinforce the Portland Courthouse. However, under a deal worked out between Governor Kate Brown and the Trump administration, federal agents withdrew to standby locations on July 30, while state and local law enforcement forces took over responsibility for protecting the courthouse; they made no arrests and mostly stayed out of sight. A DHS spokesperson said federal officers would remain in the area at least until August 3.

On July 31, Democratic members of the Senate Intelligence Committee sent a letter to acting Under Secretary of Homeland Security for Intelligence and Analysis Brian Murphy inquiring about federal surveillance activities after The Washington Post acquired a DHS Open Source Intelligence Report reportedly revealing that Homeland Security had access to and scrutinized Telegram app messages posted by Portland protesters. It was not clear how the messages were acquired and the messages apparently did not discuss violent activity, but tactics on how to evade law enforcement during demonstrations. A day prior, Chad Wolf had ordered the DHS Office of Intelligence and Analysis to stop collecting information on journalists after a separate Washington Post report.

On August 26, Federal Protective Service officers and other DHS personnel used tear gas and impact munitions to disperse a crowd of demonstrators from the Immigration and Customs Enforcement building in South Waterfront.

=== Lawsuits and investigations ===
CBP memo from PACT on July 1, 2020

Border Patrol agents in Portland were not "specifically trained in riot control or mass demonstrations", according to an internal DHS memo.

The president's actions raised "the prospect of a constitutional crisis" according to the Associated Press.

The Oregon chapter of the American Civil Liberties Union had already filed a lawsuit against local entities on June 28, claiming that police targeted and attacked journalists and legal observers, and on July 17, the ACLU added the Department of Homeland Security and the United States Marshals Service as defendants in that lawsuit. The group also called for a special prosecutor to investigate civil rights violations by federal agents. On July 23, federal judge Michael Simon issued a 14-day temporary restraining order blocking federal law enforcement "from arresting or using force against journalists or legal observers unless there is probable cause, ... [and stating] that journalists and legal observers will not be required to leave an area if federal agents issue an order to disperse, and that federal officers can't seize a journalist's press pass or equipment unless they're being lawfully arrested."

Attorney General of Oregon Ellen Rosenblum filed a lawsuit against the federal government and "John Does 1–10", the still-unidentified federal agents, alleging that they had seized Oregonians without probable cause. The lawsuit requested a restraining order to be issued against U.S. Customs and Border Protection, DHS, the U.S. Federal Protective Service and U.S. Marshals Service to stop them from making further arrests in Portland. It alleged violations of civil rights by arresting and detaining people without a warrant and denying them due process in violation of the Fourth and Fifth Amendments to the U.S. Constitution.

On July 27, Protect Democracy and Perkins Coie filed a federal lawsuit on behalf of Wall of Moms, Don't Shoot Portland, and several protesters against the Department of Homeland Security, Customs and Border Protection, Immigration and Customs Enforcement, the U.S. Marshals Service, the Federal Protective Service, the Department of Justice, and the heads of these federal agencies. The suit accuses the defendants of violating the plaintiffs' First Amendment rights and using excessive force, and it also claims that several of the acting officials haven't been confirmed for their roles and are overstepping their legal authority. The suit seeks to limit federal law enforcement to protecting federal property and to bar them from using specific actions, such as excessive crowd-control measures and custodial detentions without probable cause.

U.S. Attorney for Oregon Billy J. Williams requested that the DHS Office of Inspector General conduct an investigation into the actions of DHS personnel. On July 23, Michael Horowitz, the Department of Justice Inspector General, announced that he and the Inspector General's office at the Department of Homeland Security would be investigating the federal law enforcement responses in Portland, "examining the training and instruction that was provided to the DOJ law enforcement personnel; compliance with applicable identification requirements, rules of engagement, and legal authorities; and adherence to DOJ policies regarding the use of less-lethal munitions, chemical agents, and other uses of force."

A 2021 DHS internal report found that senior DHS officials had sought to portray the Portland protests, without evidence, as an organized effort by antifa to attack government institutions, had encouraged staff to conduct illegal warrantless searches of the cellphones of arrested protesters, and had compiled dossiers on protesters in order to attempt to prove coordination.

=== Reactions ===
The Governor of Oregon, Kate Brown, said the actions of the federal agents were a "blatant abuse of power" and reported having told Acting Homeland Security Secretary Chad Wolf that "the federal government should remove all federal officers from our streets" and accused him of "putting both Oregonians and local law enforcement officers in harm's way". In an NBC News editorial, senior U.S. Senator for Oregon Ron Wyden described the federal officers as an "occupying army—complete with fatigues, military-style equipment and tactics that are utterly unacceptable in an American city." Oregon's junior U.S. Senator, Jeff Merkley, condemned "deploying paramilitary forces with no identification indicating who they are or who they work for" and demanded "not only that these acts end, but also that they remove their forces immediately from our state." Kentucky Senator Rand Paul stated, "Local law enforcement can and should be handling these situations in our cities but there is no place for federal troops or unidentified federal agents rounding people up at will." Massachusetts Congressman Jim McGovern referred to Trump as a "dictator".

The chairs of the House Committee on Homeland Security, the Judiciary Committee, and the Committee on Oversight and Reform jointly authored a letter calling for an investigation, writing: "Citizens are concerned that the Administration has deployed a secret police force, not to investigate crimes but to intimidate individuals it views as political adversaries".

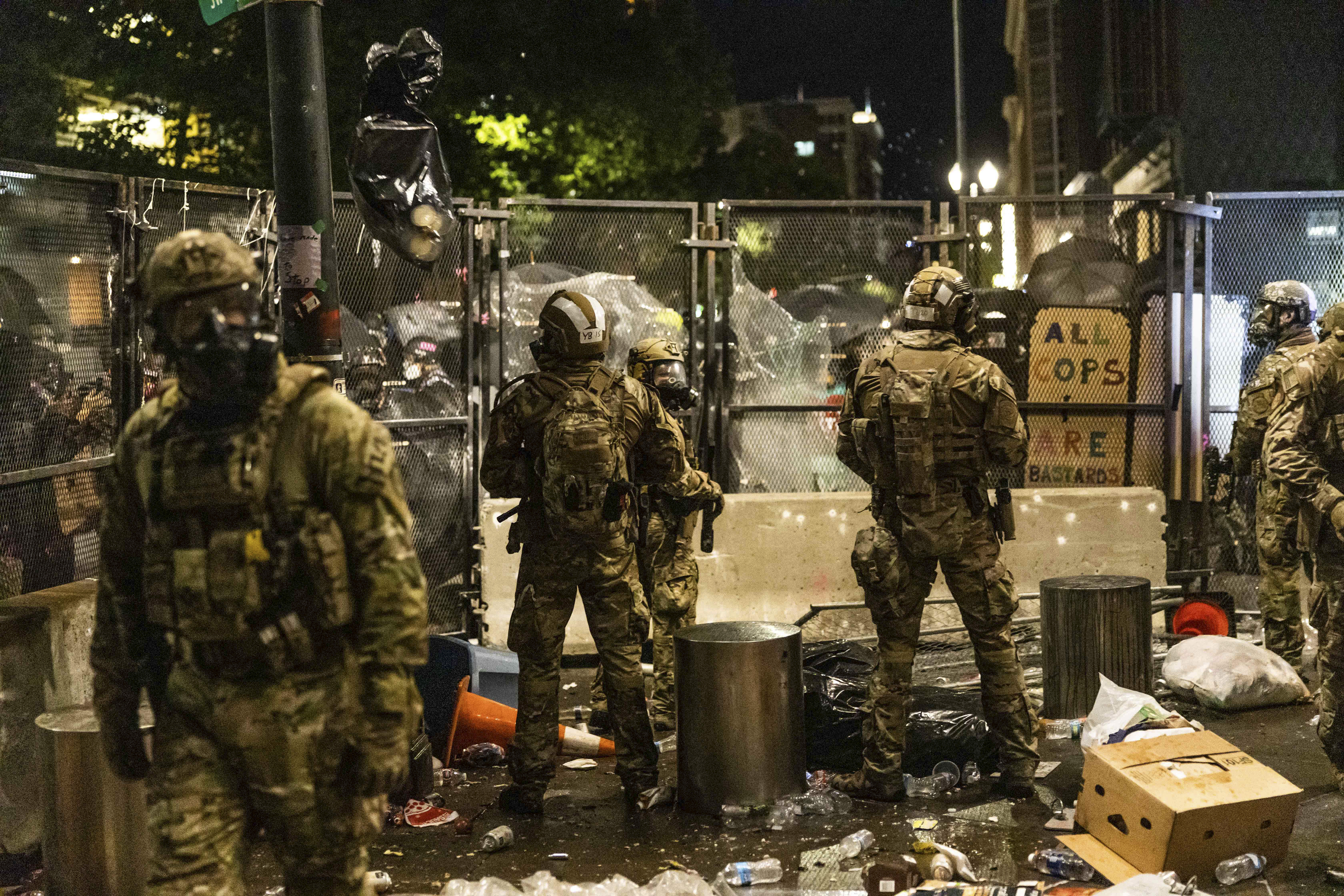
Federal agents guarding the Mark O. Hatfield federal courthouse during protests on July 25, 2020

According to a Pentagon spokesperson, Secretary of Defense Mark Esper was troubled by reports of unidentified officers in militarized garb.

Cornell University professor of constitutional law Michael C. Dorf said, "The idea that there's a threat to a federal courthouse and the federal authorities are going to swoop in and do whatever they want to do without any cooperation and coordination with state and local authorities is extraordinary outside the context of a civil war." Attorney Juan Chavez, the Northwest vice president of the National Lawyers Guild, told Oregon Public Broadcasting in response to the Pettibone case, "It's like stop and frisk meets Guantánamo Bay ... It sounds more like abduction. It sounds like they're kidnapping people off the streets."

Tom Ridge, DHS's founding Secretary and a former governor of Pennsylvania, decried the deployment, saying DHS "was not established to be the president's personal militia". Ridge further opined "it would be a cold day in hell before I would consent to an uninvited, unilateral intervention into one of my cities." Former DHS Secretary Jeh Johnson likewise condemned the deployment and argued that public concerns were not an overreaction. Former DHS Senior Official John Sandweg argued the deployment "is so damaging to the brands of the agencies. It guts public safety." Some DHS employees, speaking on condition of anonymity, decried the deployment as "blatantly unconstitutional and an embarrassment to the agency and the career civil servants who work here."

DHS Acting Secretary Chad Wolf dismissed criticism saying, "I don't need invitations by the state, state mayors or state governors to do our job. We're going to do that, whether they like us there or not," and "If you are a violent rioter looking to inflict damage on federal property or law enforcement officers, you need to find another line of work ... We will not retreat, we will continue to protect our facilities and our law enforcement officers." Wolf further defended Homeland Security's actions during the Portland protests at a Senate panel on August 6, denouncing local officials' lack of cooperation as "dangerous" and dismissing two former DHS secretaries' criticisms that federal agents had "no respect for ... the wishes of local authorities" as "dead wrong". He contended that DHS and DOJ officers were "abandoned" by city officials and that the "Cooperation and assistance our federal officers receive in any other city around the country did not exist in Portland."

The Intercept noted the use of smoke grenades containing Hexachloroethane particularly noting that "Protesters who were exposed to chemical gas ... report ... effects not usually associated with tear gas".

== Activities in Seattle ==
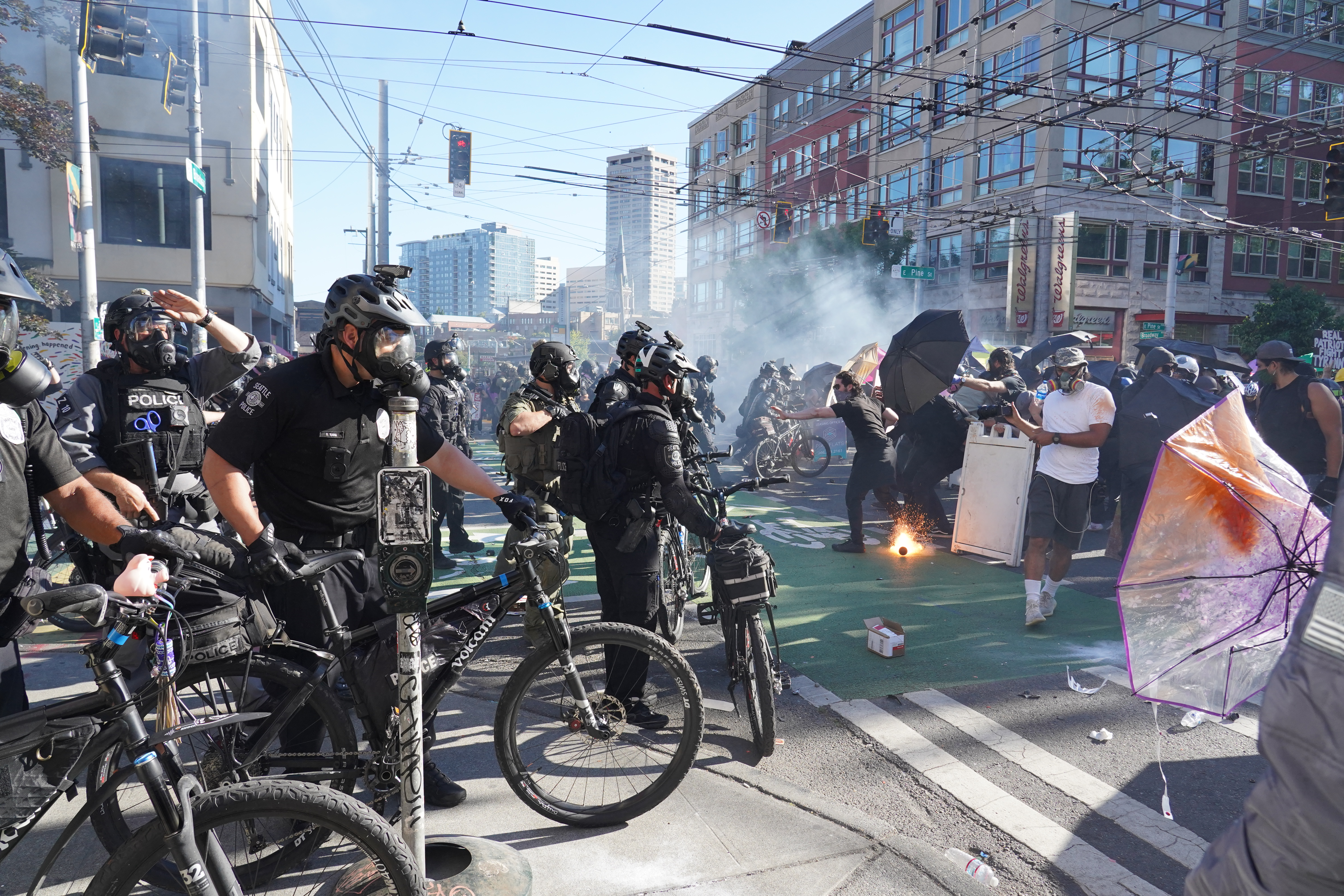
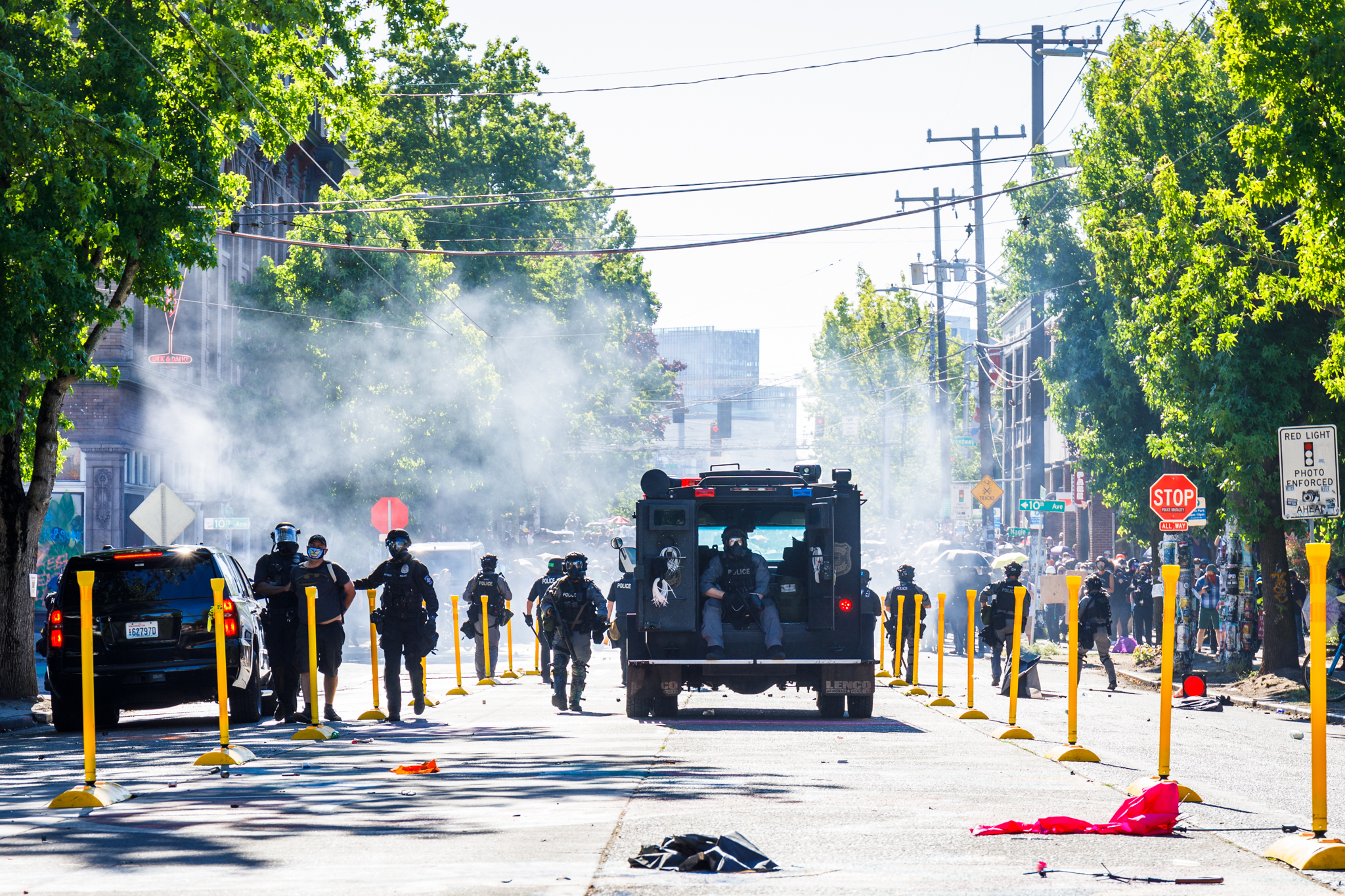
Seattle police dispersing anti-federal protesters on July 25, 2020

In advance of the July 4 holiday, CBP sent agents in support of FPS forces to the Henry M. Jackson Federal Building in downtown Seattle. CBP deployed 50 total agents that were then distributed among Seattle, WA; Portland, OR; and Washington, D.C. State and city officials and the Seattle Police Department were not informed of the activity. They did not make any arrests in Seattle. DHS sent BORTAC agents and ICE tactical officers to both Seattle and Portland. The Washington Post reported on July 20 that the federal agents, sent in anticipation of clashes on Independence Day, had mostly been withdrawn from Seattle.

On July 23, an unspecified number of CBP agents were sent to an undisclosed location in the Seattle area. Seattle Mayor Jenny Durkan learned of the deployment from the agency late in the day on July 23, despite an earlier claim from DHS Acting Secretary Chad Wolf, who told her the agency had no plans to send federal agents to the city and that he would inform her of any changes.

On July 25, thousands of protesters gathered in Seattle (one of several U.S. cities) where demonstrations took place in solidarity with Portland, Oregon after tensions escalated due to the Trump administration's decision to deploy federal agents against the wishes of local officials. The federal agents were not a visible presence in the protests, during which city and county police arrested 45 people.

The following week, the federal security detail sent to Seattle was withdrawn, following continued pressure from local and Washington state officials.

=== Reactions ===
Washington Governor Jay Inslee responded to the deployment in a tweet stating "President Trump sent federal officers to Seattle because he is itching for a confrontation. He wants attention. We shouldn't give him either. Keep it peaceful, keep the attention where it belongs – on building a better, more just Washington for everyone." Washington U.S. Senators Patty Murray and Maria Cantwell co-sponsored a bill to limit the activities of federal agents to federal property and the immediate vicinity, unless requested by the mayor and governor, and to prevent unmarked vehicles from being used in arrests.

In response to the withdrawal of federal officers, King County Executive Dow Constantine said the "apparent swift departure of Trump's uninvited and unneeded federal forces is a welcome turn of events."

== Operation Legend ==
The President's action of deploying federal law enforcement to various U.S. cities was code named Operation Legend. (The operation was named after, although not capitalized the same as, LeGend Taliferro, a Kansas City-native child victim of gun violence.)

On July 8, the U.S. Department of Justice announced that federal law enforcement would first be dispatched to Kansas City, Missouri. The federal assistance was at the request of governor Mike Parson, although Kansas City Mayor Quinton Lucas stated that he was neither consulted nor notified about the operation. Kansas City activist Skyler B. Harrington from the organization Black Rainbow wrote in an editorial, "We are on the verge of a federal occupation in Kansas City—and you should be alarmed...We are the guinea pig for President Donald Trump's promise to 'take over cities'...Healing our communities has never been and never will be achieved through increased policing...We must fundamentally divest from our broken policing system to invest in our communities."

Attorney General Barr directed agents from the FBI, U.S. Marshal Service, Drug Enforcement Administration, and the Bureau of Alcohol, Tobacco, Firearms and Explosives to help local law enforcement to quell a "surge of violent crime." Agents were expected to be on the ground by July 18.

On July 20, the first federal arrest under Operation Legend was announced. That same day, Trump publicly praised the Portland policing and said he may send "more federal law enforcement" to "New York, Chicago, Philadelphia, Detroit, Baltimore, Oakland, and other cities to deal with unrest". Trump said, "I'm gonna do something, that I can tell you, because we're not going to let New York and Chicago and Philadelphia and Detroit and Baltimore and all of these—Oakland is a mess. We're not going to let this happen in our country." Trump further said the listed cities were "all run by liberal Democrats".

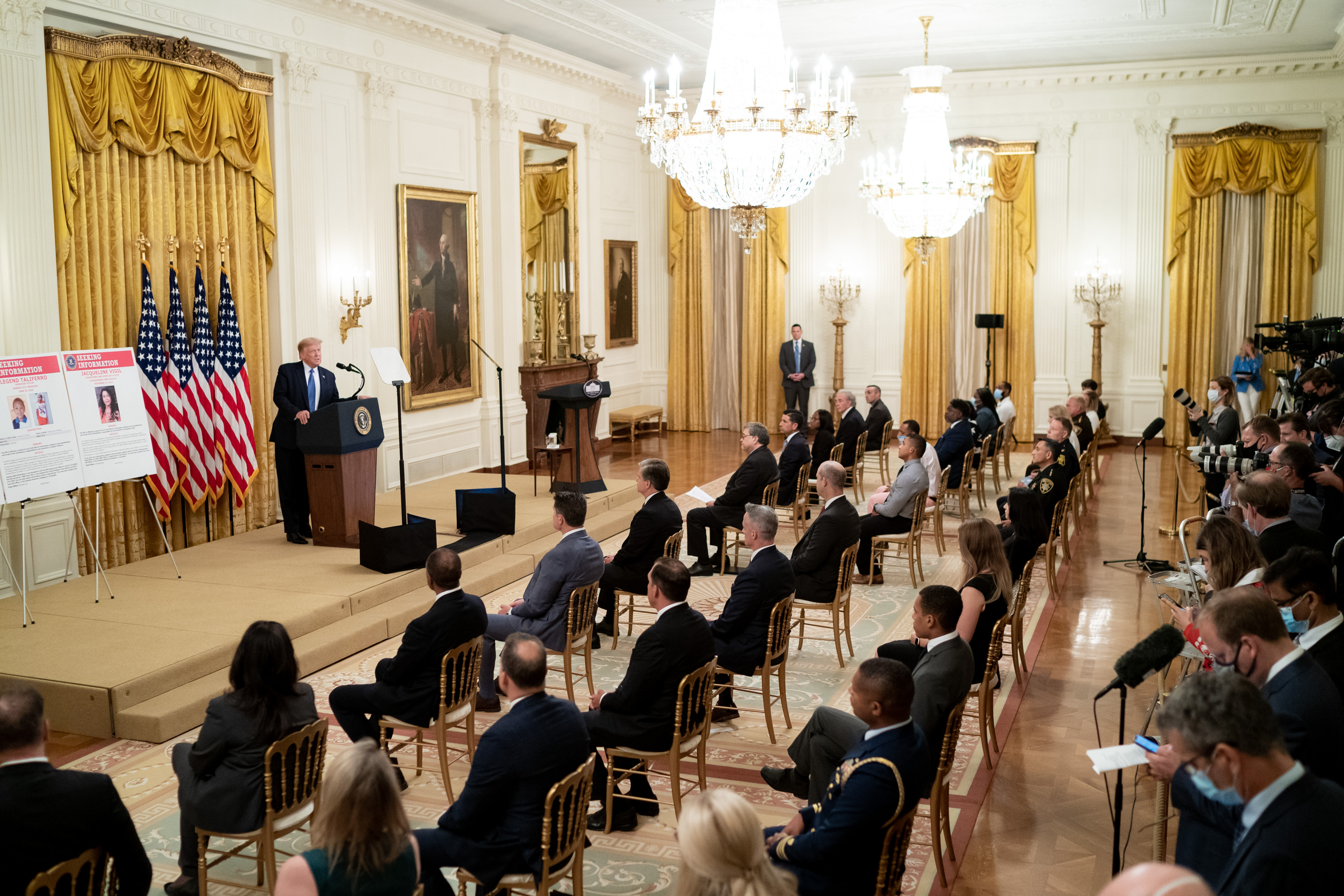
President Donald Trump delivers remarks on Operation Legend in the White House on July 22, 2020

On July 21, U. S. Attorney Timothy Garrison specified that an additional 225 federal agents from the FBI, the DEA, the USMS, and the ATF would join 400 agents already working and living in the Kansas City area. Garrison argued that the operation will not bear any resemblance to those in Portland, insisting that agents will be clearly identifiable.

On July 22, President Trump announced that forces would be deployed to Chicago and Albuquerque as part of Operation Legend. In an interview with Sean Hannity the next day, Trump added that if invited, "We will go into all of the cities, any of the cities. We're ready. We will put in 50,000, 60,000 people that really know what they're doing. And they're strong. They're tough. And we could solve these problems so fast."

On July 29, the Department of Justice announced that Operation Legend had expanded to Cleveland, Detroit, and Milwaukee. More than two dozen federal officers were sent to each city from a combination of the FBI, DEA, ATF, and the U.S. Marshals to work on existing local law enforcement efforts aimed at combating gang violence, gun crimes, and drug trafficking. The expansion also included several millions dollars in funding, some of it going to hire additional local law enforcement officers.

=== Reactions ===
External videos
- Mayors respond to Trump agent 'surge', BBC News

==== State ====
The deployment was jointly condemned by the Mayors of Portland, Chicago, Atlanta, Seattle, D.C., and Kansas City. Chicago mayor Lori Lightfoot condemned the plan, arguing "What we do not need, and what will certainly make our community less safe is secret, federal agents". On July 27 mayors Wheeler, Durkan, Lightfoot, Lucas, Keller and Muriel Bowser of Washington, D.C., jointly called on Congress to make it illegal for the federal government to deploy militarized agents to cities against those cities' wishes, describing the deployment as an "egregious use of federal force on cities over the objections of local authorities".

The Oakland Police Department stated it had not requested federal assistance, and the San Francisco chapter of the National Lawyers Guild denounced the plan as "not only unconstitutional but a dangerous escalation towards fascism."

Philadelphia's mayor Jim Kenney denounced the plan and said his city would "use all available means to resist such a wrong-headed effort and abuse of power", and district attorney Larry Krasner issued a statement warning that "Anyone, including federal law enforcement, who unlawfully assaults and kidnaps people will face criminal charges".

New York City Mayor Bill de Blasio said of a potential deployment, "It would backfire, it wouldn't make us safer, and we would immediately take action in court to stop it...From my point of view, this would be yet another example of illegal and unconstitutional actions by the President."

New York Governor Andrew Cuomo in a news conference on July 23 said that during a phone call with the President on July 22 that both were able to agree that no federal action would be necessary to address the rising crime rates in New York City, and that if Trump had changed his mind he would talk with Cuomo first.

Albuquerque Mayor Tim Keller opposed the expansion, saying "There's no place for Trump's secret police in our city"; Albuquerque Police Chief Mike Geier likewise opposed the plan. U.S. Senator from New Mexico Martin Heinrich condemned the expansion, writing: "If we can learn anything from Portland, it's that we don't need this kind of 'help' from the White House. The President is currently using federal law enforcement agents like a domestic paramilitary force. That's precisely how fascism begins and none of us should ever encourage or accept it."

==== Federal ====
United States House of Representatives Majority Leader Steny H. Hoyer released a statement saying, "In deploying federal law enforcement to patrol American cities like Portland and Chicago and silence those exercising their First Amendment rights, Donald Trump is drawing from the playbook of the worst dictators of the past century. Like others we have seen in some of the darkest periods of history, he is perpetuating a myth of disorder and mob violence–which is not occurring—to justify his deployment of heavily armed, anonymous, military-style agents into our communities who pull peaceful citizens into unmarked vehicles and detain them without lawful cause. These actions are never justified in what is supposed to be the world's greatest and freest democratic republic."

House Judiciary Committee chairman Jerrold Nadler said, "The legal basis for this use of force has never been explained...it is not at all clear that the Attorney General and the Acting Secretary are authorized to deploy federal law enforcement officers in this manner." U.S. House Homeland Security chairman Bennie Thompson and U.S. House Oversight and Reform chairwoman Carolyn Maloney wrote a letter calling for investigation into the deployment. House and Senate Democrats revealed plans for the "Preventing Authoritarian Policing Tactics on America's Streets Act" requiring federal officers to identify themselves and limit their activities to directly nearby federal property. House Democrats also included a requirement for identification in the year's National Defense Authorization Act.

== Legality ==
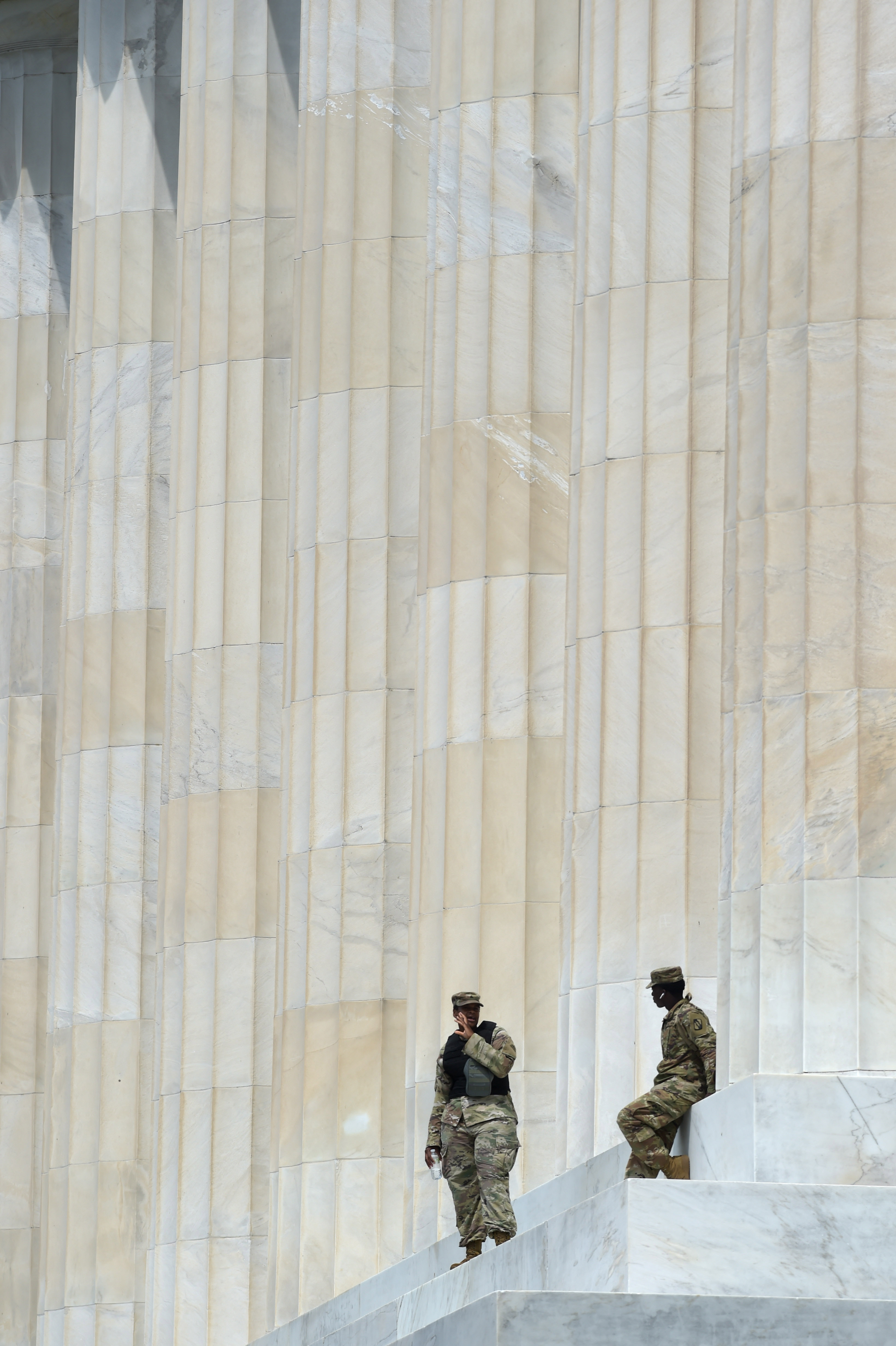
National Guardsmen protecting the Lincoln Memorial on June 6, 2020

Boston College constitutional law professor Kent Greenfield said, "The president is not the king...The president does not have the ability to require states to enforce their laws in a certain way, or to elbow aside their law enforcement abilities." University of Notre Dame law professor Jimmy Gurulé said, "There is no federal statute agents are enforcing by engaging with protesters. My concern is whether their protection of federal property is a ruse to interfere with protesters' free speech."

Drexel University law professor Anil Kahlan said, "The rhetoric is basically labeling people who are fellow citizens as domestic enemies and then deploying these paramilitary forces to aggressively engage in a show of force against them...There are serious, substantive legal concerns with these activities." Rutgers University professor of law and director of Rutgers' Constitutional Rights Clinic Alexis Karteron said, "Federal troops descending on American cities, that is very troubling, outside of historic practices, and almost certainly illegal."

Harvard legal scholar Andrew Crespo analyzed on Lawfare, "The argument... is that these [federal] agents complied with the Fourth Amendment because they did not need probable cause to put [protestors] in the van in the first place. This assertion is glaringly wrong. It has been glaringly wrong for at least forty years, ever since the Supreme Court's opinion in Dunaway v. New York."

== See also ==
- 2025 deployment of federal forces in the United States
- Militarization of police
- Police brutality in the United States
- Comparisons were made to the "little green men", unidentified camouflaged soldiers seen during the 2014 Russian annexation of Crimea.
- Secret police
- BORTAC, U.S. Border Patrol's SWAT team equivalent
- Fourth Amendment to the United States Constitution
- June 2025 Los Angeles protests
