= Protecting American Communities Task Force =

Part of the US Department of Homeland Security

DHS Protecting American Communities Task Force

Special task force overview
- Formed: July 1, 2020; 6 years ago
- Jurisdiction: U.S. Government
- Annual budget: Unknown
- Parent department: Department of Homeland Security
- Child agencies: Federal Protective Service; United States Secret Service; Immigration and Customs Enforcement; Customs and Border Protection United States Border Patrol Border Patrol Tactical Unit CBP Air and Marine Operations; Transportation Security Administration; United States Coast Guard
- Key document: Presidential Executive Order Protecting American Monuments, Memorials, and Statues and Combating Recent Criminal Violence

The DHS Protecting American Communities Task Force – often abbreviated PACT and commonly referred to as the Protecting American Communities Task Force – is a departmental task force of the Department of Homeland Security. PACT is mandated to officially coordinate riot control and security police operations to protect monuments, memorials, and federal property, monitor civil unrest, protect civilians from rioting or vandalism, or respond to the destruction of federal property by protesters. PACT was formed on July 1, 2020 in the wake of the George Floyd protests under direction of Acting Secretary of Homeland Security Chad Wolf. The task force is also mandated to coordinate its law enforcement efforts with the United States Department of Justice and United States Department of Defense. PACT has attracted significant controversy and criticism from various media outlets for its operations and alleged goals.

== Role and controversy ==
The task force is responsible for coordinating with the Interior and Justice Departments in the deployment of law enforcement personnel to federally operated and owned properties that are believed to be under threat by rioters and vandals. PACT coordinates with the DHS’s subordinate protective security agencies including the Federal Protective Service, United States Secret Service, Immigration and Customs Enforcement, Customs and Border Protection, and Transportation Security Administration.

The task force has encountered significant criticism due to its role in the 2020 deployment of federal forces in the United States alongside Operation Legend. The task force has been accused by various protesters of defending and protecting monuments depicting individuals with ties to racism and/or slavery. Other liberal and progressive groups and individuals accuse the task force as acting as a secret police force, arresting and confining anyone who protest peacefully against racism, police brutality, and social injustice.

== Organization and personnel ==
The PACT was founded at the direction of Homeland Security Secretary Chad Wolf to co-ordinate security policing efforts with the DHS’s subordinate protective security agencies in the deployment of Rapid Deployment Teams (RDTs).

There is no known estimate about the number of active personnel in the Rapid Deployment Teams or any information with regards to where they are deployed. However, field operations personnel for PACT are drawn from the Federal Protective Service, United States Secret Service, Immigration and Customs Enforcement, Customs and Border Protection, and Transportation Security Administration.
