= Undocumented =

Undocumented may refer to:

- Undocumented (film), a 2010 horror thriller
- The Undocumented, a documentary film by Marco Williams

== See also ==
- Undocumented feature, in software releases
- Undocumented flying object
- Undocumented immigrant, an immigrant into a country who is in violation of the immigration laws of that country.
