= Tammy Dickinson =

American attorney

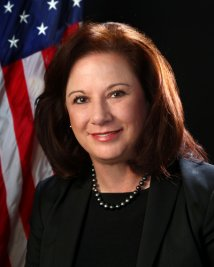

United States Attorney for the Western District of Missouri
- In office January 7, 2013 – March 10, 2017
- President: Barack Obama; Donald Trump
- Preceded by: David Ketchmark (acting)
- Succeeded by: Timothy A. Garrison

Personal details
- Born: October 6, 1973 (age 52)
- Party: Democratic
- Education: Webster University (BA); University of Missouri (JD)

Angela Tammy Dickinson (born October 6, 1973) is an American attorney who served as the United States Attorney for the Western District of Missouri from 2013 to 2017.

== Education ==
Dickinson her received Bachelor of Arts in 1989 from Webster University and her Juris Doctor in 1998 from the University of Missouri Law School.

== Legal career ==
In 2002, she worked briefly at the law firm of Bartimus, Frickleton, Robertson, & Gorny, P.C. She worked as Assistant Prosecutor in the Jackson County Prosecutor's Office from 1998 to 2002. She served as the Chief Trial Assistant for the Jackson County Prosecutor's Office, from 2002 to 2013.

== United States Attorney ==
On July 12, 2012 she was nominated to be the United States Attorney for the Western District of Missouri. On November 29, 2012 she was reported favorably by the United States Senate Committee on the Judiciary and she was later confirmed by voice vote on January 1, 2013. She was sworn into office on January 7, 2013.

== See also ==
- 2017 dismissal of U.S. attorneys
