= Timothy A. Garrison =

American attorney (born 1976)

Tim Garrison
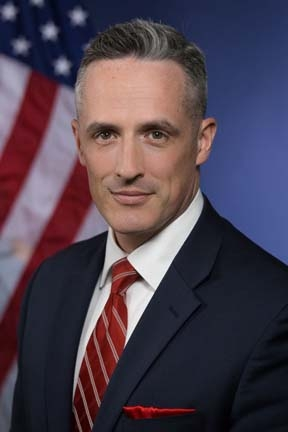

United States Attorney for the Western District of Missouri
- In office January 5, 2018 – February 28, 2021; Interim: January 5, 2018 – April 26, 2018
- President: Donald Trump; Joe Biden
- Preceded by: Tammy Dickinson
- Succeeded by: Teresa A. Moore (acting)

Personal details
- Born: Timothy Allen Garrison; 1976 (age 49–50)
- Education: Drury University (BS); University of Missouri (MPA, JD); Marine Corps OCS; Marine Corps University EWS
- Awards: Bronze Star Medal; Combat Action Ribbon; Defense Meritorious Service Medal; Navy & Marine Corps Commendation Medals (2x); Navy & Marine Corps Achievement Medal

Military service
- Allegiance: United States
- Branch/service: USMC; USMC Reserve
- Years of service: 2003–2007 (active); 2007–present (reserve)
- Rank: Colonel

Timothy Allen Garrison is an American lawyer and Marine Corps officer who served as the United States Attorney for the Western District of Missouri from 2018 to 2021.

== Education ==
Garrison earned a bachelor of arts, magna cum laude, in political science from Drury University, and a Master of Public Administration and Juris Doctor from the University of Missouri. He received his officer's commission after graduating from Marine Corps Officer Candidates School in 2003 and is a distinguished graduate of the Marine Corps Expeditionary Warfare School and Command and Staff College.

== Career ==
Marine Corps Officer

Before becoming a federal prosecutor, Garrison was a military prosecutor in the United States Marine Corps at Marine Corps Base Camp Pendleton, during which time he deployed in support of the Iraq War in 2007. After leaving active duty, Garrison continued his military career as a reservist. He mobilized and deployed to Helmand Province in 2014 as Chief of Operational Law for Marine Expeditionary Brigade-Afghanistan, for which he was awarded the Combat Action Ribbon and Bronze Star Medal. Garrison served as Deputy Legal Counsel in the Office of the Chairman of the Joint Chiefs of Staff and as Associate Deputy General Counsel of the Department of Defense for International Affairs at The Pentagon. Garrison also served as a judge on the Navy-Marine Corps Court of Criminal Appeals. He is now a Colonel in the Marine Corps Reserve and serves as a national security law advisor for NORAD and United States Northern Command. In 2022, Garrison received the Judge Advocates Association's Outstanding Career Judge Advocate Award.

Federal Prosecutor

From 2007 to 2018, he served as an Assistant United States Attorney in the Western District of Missouri, prosecuting interstate and international drug trafficking, money laundering, murder, and other offenses. He is a recipient of the Missouri Bar's Appellate Advocacy Award for his work before the United States Court of Appeals for the Eighth Circuit.

=== United States Attorney ===
On February 16, 2018, President Donald Trump announced his intent to nominate Garrison to be the U.S. Attorney for the Western District of Missouri. On February 27, 2018, his nomination was sent to the Senate. On April 26, 2018, his nomination was confirmed by voice vote.

Garrison made violent crime and drug trafficking the priorities of his tenure as U.S. Attorney, and led the initial phase of Operation Legend. The enforcement effort resulted in the arrests of over 500 individuals wanted for violent crimes, including more than three dozen homicides, and brought about significant reductions in violent crime in the Kansas City area in the summer of 2020.

On February 8, 2021, he along with 55 other U.S. attorneys were asked to resign. On February 11, Garrison announced his resignation effective February 28.

Private Practice

From 2021 to 2023, Garrison was a partner at the Am Law 100 firm Husch Blackwell, advising clients from individuals to Fortune 500 companies in the firm's white collar, internal investigations, and compliance practice. Since 2023, he has been senior counsel at Alliance Defending Freedom.

== Awards and decorations ==
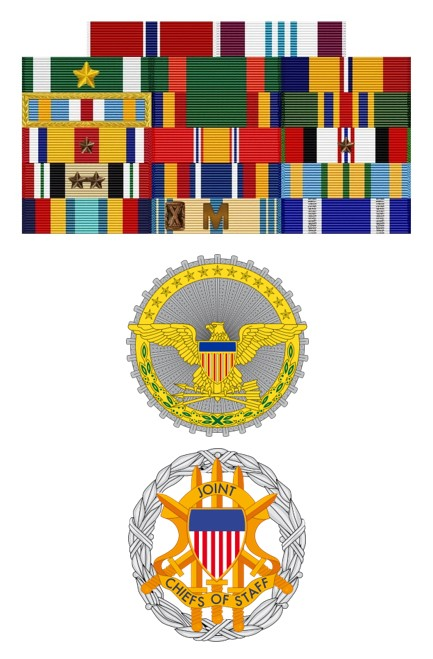

Row	Decoration		
First Row	Bronze Star Medal	Defense Meritorious Service Medal	
Second Row	Commendation Medal#Navy, Marine Corps, and Coast Guard with gold star in lieu of second award	Achievement Medal#U.S. Navy and U.S. Marine Corps	Combat Action Ribbon
Third Row	Joint Meritorious Unit Award	Navy Unit Commendation	Meritorious Unit Commendation
Fourth Row	Selected Marine Corps Reserve Medal with service star	National Defense Service Medal	Afghanistan Campaign Medal with service star
Fifth Row	Iraq Campaign Medal with two service stars	Global War on Terrorism Service Medal	Military Outstanding Volunteer Service Medal
Sixth Row	Sea Service Deployment Ribbon	Armed Forces Reserve Medal with bronze hourglass and mobilization device	NATO ISAF Medal
Seventh Row	Office of the Secretary of Defense Identification Badge		
Eighth Row	Joint Chiefs of Staff Identification Badge		
