= The Undocumented =

The Undocumented is a 90-minute documentary film, released in 2013, directed by Marco Williams, which investigates the causes and effects of migrant deaths along the Arizona-Mexico border.

== Synopsis ==
The Undocumented tells the stories of migrants who have died in the Arizona desert and follows them on their long journey home. The film is woven from multiple narrative threads. In Arizona, it depicts the efforts of the Pima County, Arizona Medical Examiner and the Mexican Consulate of Tucson, Arizona to name unidentified deceased border crossers, with the ultimate goal of returning them to their families. It also follows U.S. Border Patrol, Search, Trauma and Rescue (BOSTAR) agents, who must balance law enforcement with lifesaving. In Mexico, the film documents the reunification of the dead with their families and chronicles stories of loved ones who disappeared while crossing the border, never to be heard from again.

== Historical background ==
According to US Border Patrol statistics, 417 undocumented border crossers died trying to enter the United States in fiscal year 2009, representing the first increase in four years. The majority of migrant deaths occur in Arizona's Sonoran Desert, with 213 confirmed to have died in the Tucson sector alone in fiscal year 2009. Researchers have attributed the preponderance of migrant deaths in Arizona to a so-called "funnel effect"; they argue that the militarization of the border has caused illegal immigrants to risk crossing through more remote sections of the Arizona desert, leading to a spike in Arizona's migrant deaths, which rose from 9 in 1990 to 201 in 2005.

== Production status and broadcast ==
Principle filming of The Undocumented took place from June to December 2009. Post-production began in February 2010, with editor David Meneses and associate producer Thomas Peyton working alongside director Marco Williams.

The Undocumented was produced with support from ITVS, the Ford Foundation, and the Fledgling Fund. Produced for PBS, it aired in the USA on 6 April 2013.
