= BORTAC =

United States Border Patrol tactical response arm

Border Patrol Tactical Unit
- Active: 1984 – present
- Country: United States
- Agency: United States Border Patrol
- Type: Police tactical unit
- Part of: Special Operations Group
- Headquarters: Biggs Army Airfield
- Motto: Erigere Rapidus
- Abbreviation: BORTAC

Structure
- Full-time operators: 241
- Part-time operators: 18
- Subunits: National SOG Team; Sector BORTAC teams

The Border Patrol Tactical Unit (BORTAC) is the tactical unit of the United States Border Patrol (USBP). It provides an immediate-response capability for high-risk incidents in the United States and abroad. Members support the Border Patrol mission through high-risk warrants, reconnaissance, foreign law-enforcement capacity building, counternarcotics and counter-smuggling operations. In 2007, BORTAC was placed under the command of the newly formed Special Operations Group (SOG) together with the Border Patrol Search, Trauma, and Rescue (BORSTAR).

== Mission ==
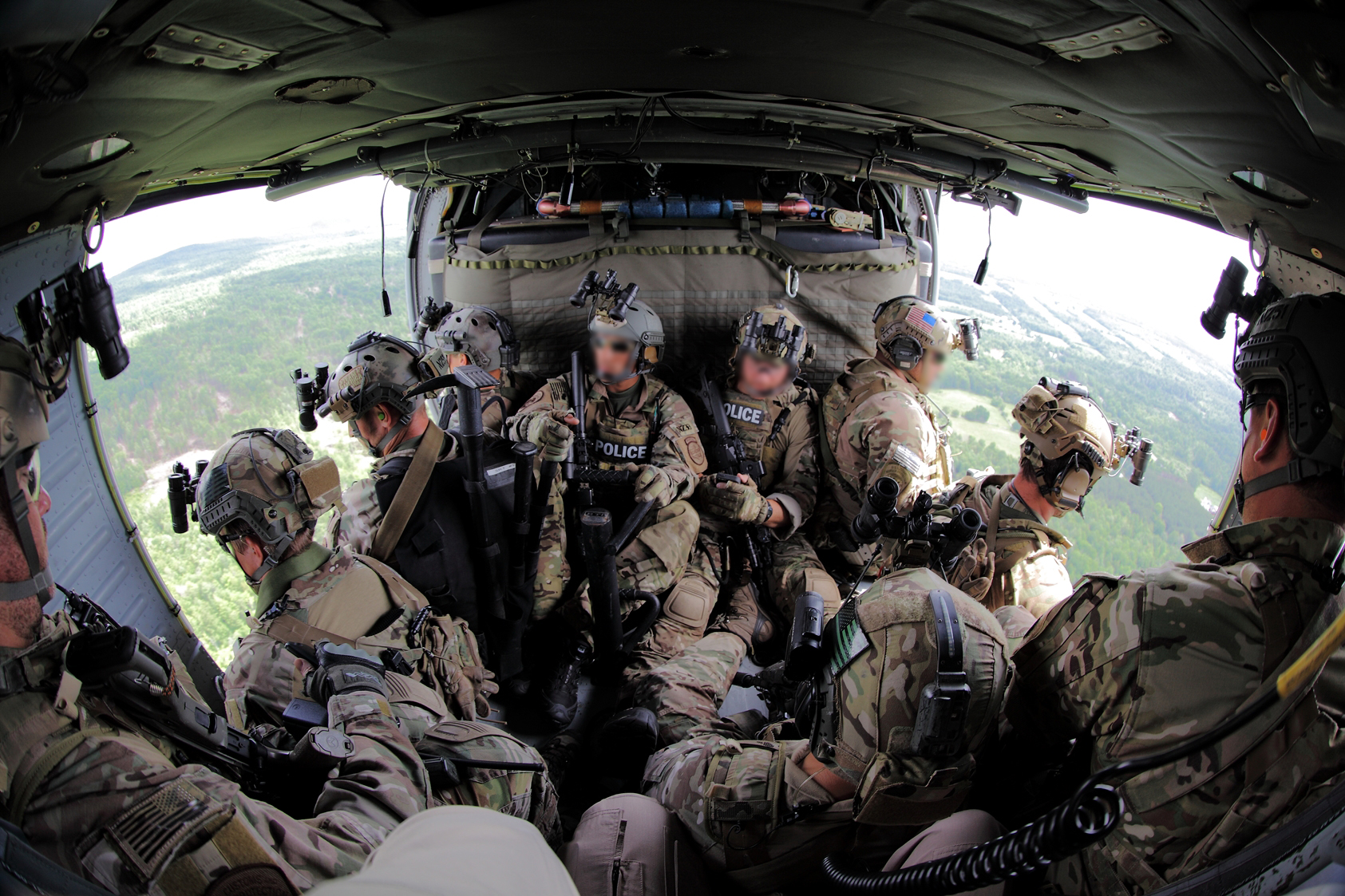
BORTAC operators supporting a June 2015 manhunt in New York

The mission of BORTAC is "to respond to terrorist threats of all types anywhere in the world in order to protect our nation's homeland." CBP describes BORTAC as a tactical team for high-risk missions beyond ordinary Border Patrol duties. BORTAC specializes in cartel-linked counter-smuggling operations and the War on drugs, including the ability to track subjects through rural or mobile interdiction far from a port of entry. Teams are sometimes attached to other U.S. Customs and Border Protection elements, including Border Patrol sectors, BORSTAR, and CBP Air and Marine Operations.

BORTAC has supported National Special Security Events (NSSE), such as the Super Bowl. It has supported disaster-response operations which included Hurricane Katrina. Other high-profile domestic missions have included the 1992 Los Angeles riots, the 2015 Clinton Correctional Facility escape, 2020 sanctuary-city operations with U.S. Immigration and Customs Enforcement, and later interior deployments reported in cities such as those covered during 2025–26 immigration operations in Minnesota. BORTAC also deploys away from the border. Overseas, BORTAC has trained foreign partners in border security and counternarcotics.

== History ==
The unit was first formed in 1984 to deal with disturbances occurring within Immigration and Naturalization Service detention facilities, but this mission is now handled by United States Immigration and Customs Enforcement (ICE), Enforcement and Removal Operations (ERO), and Special Response Teams (SRT). Since its inception BORTAC has steadily expanded its scope and mission capabilities, and is now a rapid response unit capable of executing both foreign and national level domestic operations. BORTAC members have operated in 28 countries around the world. Missions have included international training/advisory functions, counter terrorism operations, counter narcotics operations, high-risk warrant service, dignitary protection, interdiction & patrol operations, and tactical training to other U.S. agencies and military units.

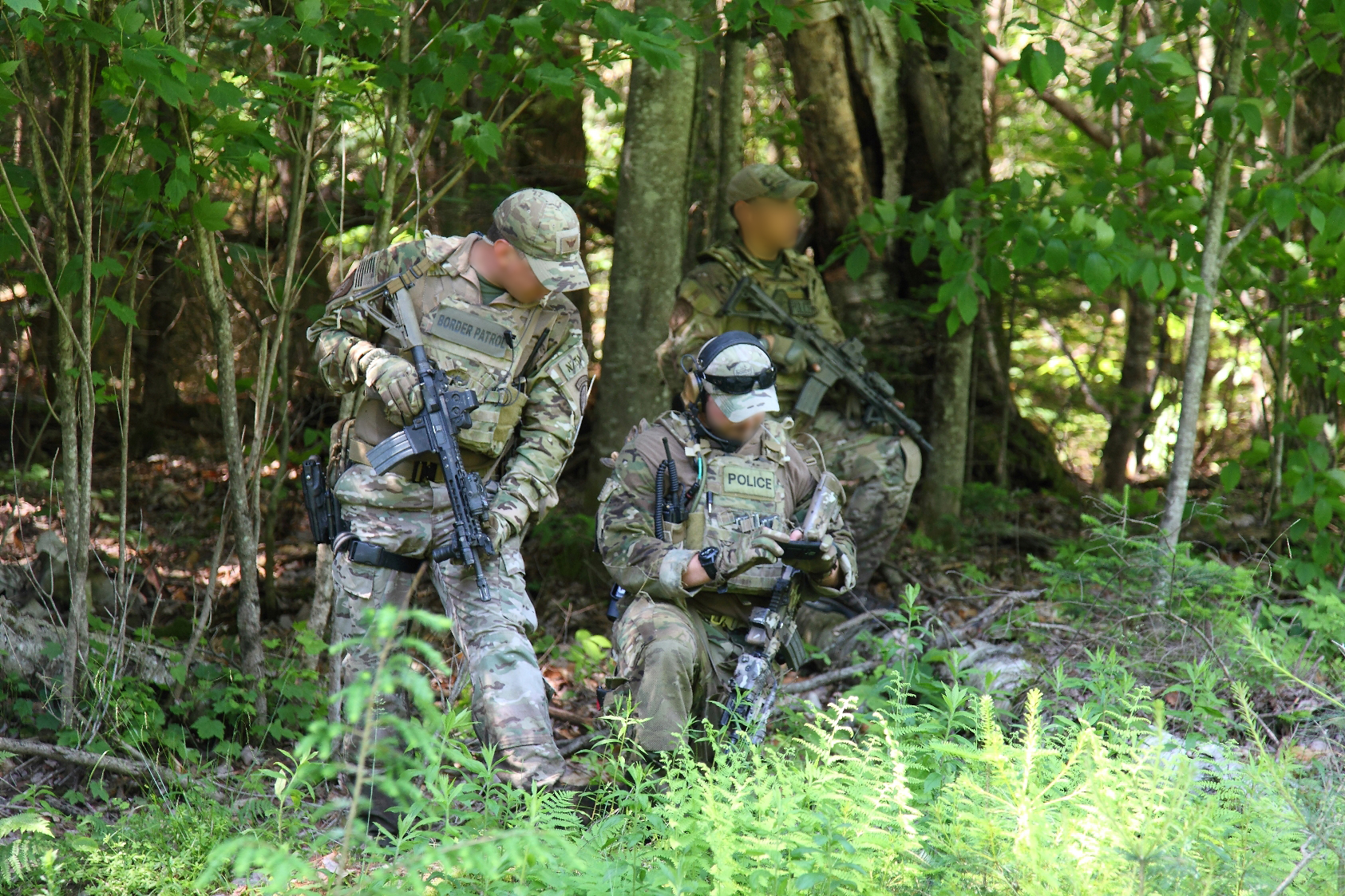
BORTAC supporting a manhunt after the 2015 Clinton Correctional Facility escape

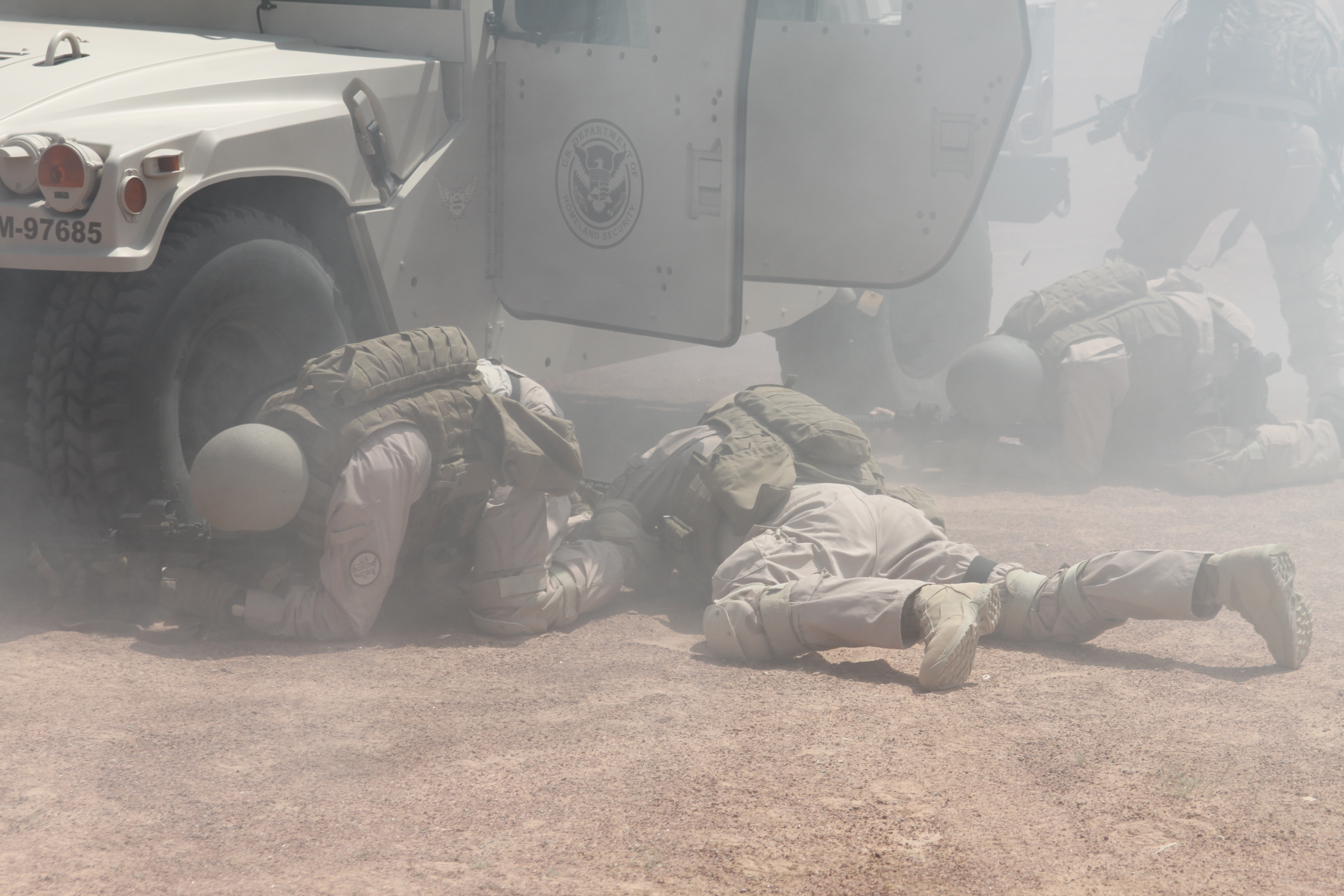
BORTAC personnel training in El Paso before a deployment in support of operations in Iraq

=== Operations ===
In the 1980s, BORTAC worked with the Drug Enforcement Administration conducting counter narcotics operations in South America during Operation Snowcap. In April 2000, the BORTAC conducted Operation Reunion, in which it executed a raid on a home in Miami, Florida, and safely returned Cuban refugee Elián González to his family in Cuba.

Following 9/11, BORTAC personnel were sent to high-risk areas around the country to help secure against future attacks. In 2002, BORTAC worked jointly with the United States Secret Service securing sports venues at the Winter Olympics in Salt Lake City. BORTAC personnel have assisted in natural disaster tactical relief operations by providing hurricane relief aid to Gulf Coast residents and law enforcement support to law enforcement agencies affected by Hurricane Katrina. BORTAC and other CBP special operations personnel such as SRT were used in overseas support roles tied to the Global War on Terrorism. Beginning in 2005, CBP tactical teams deployed to Iraq to help train Iraqi border forces.

In December 2010, BORTAC Agent Brian Terry was killed while pursuing members of a gang that operated along the border of Mexico and Arizona. In 2020, the White House deployed 100 agents including BORTAC to sanctuary cities including Atlanta, Boston, Chicago, Detroit, Houston, Los Angeles, Newark, New Orleans, New York, and San Francisco for three months to assist Immigration and Customs Enforcement (ICE) agents and act as a show of force. ICE's acting director Matthew Albence said this was being done as sanctuary city policies cause an increase in crime. This was disputed by former Customs and Border Protection commissioner Gil Kerlikowske.

In 2020, as part of the Protecting American Communities Task Force, BORTAC was deployed during the George Floyd protests in Portland, Oregon, which sparked criticism from Governor Kate Brown and others as well as a lawsuit claiming the agency engaged in unlawful detainment, arbitrarily picking up people in Portland streets in unmarked vehicles who were too far away from federal buildings to be considered a credible threat.

In 2022, during the Robb Elementary School shooting in Uvalde, Texas, the Del Rio sector field office nearby deployed BORTAC to help assist the local authorities. Arriving an hour after the beginning of the shooting, they ended the massacre by breaching the classroom where the suspect was barricaded and neutralized him. One BORTAC officer was grazed in the head by a bullet during a shootout.

== Organization ==
U.S. Border Patrol Agent with BORTAC, instructs Guatemalan soldiers with the Interagency Task Force Tecun Uman

BORTAC headquarters is co-located with its training unit at Biggs Army Airfield, on Fort Bliss in El Paso, Texas. As part of a joint Department of State/ Department of Justice training program, BORTAC has also provided tactical team and counter narcotics training to several foreign governments police, paramilitary, tactical, drug, and specialist units, including the El Salvador National Police's Grupo de Respuesta Policial (GRP) tactical unit.

== Uniforms ==
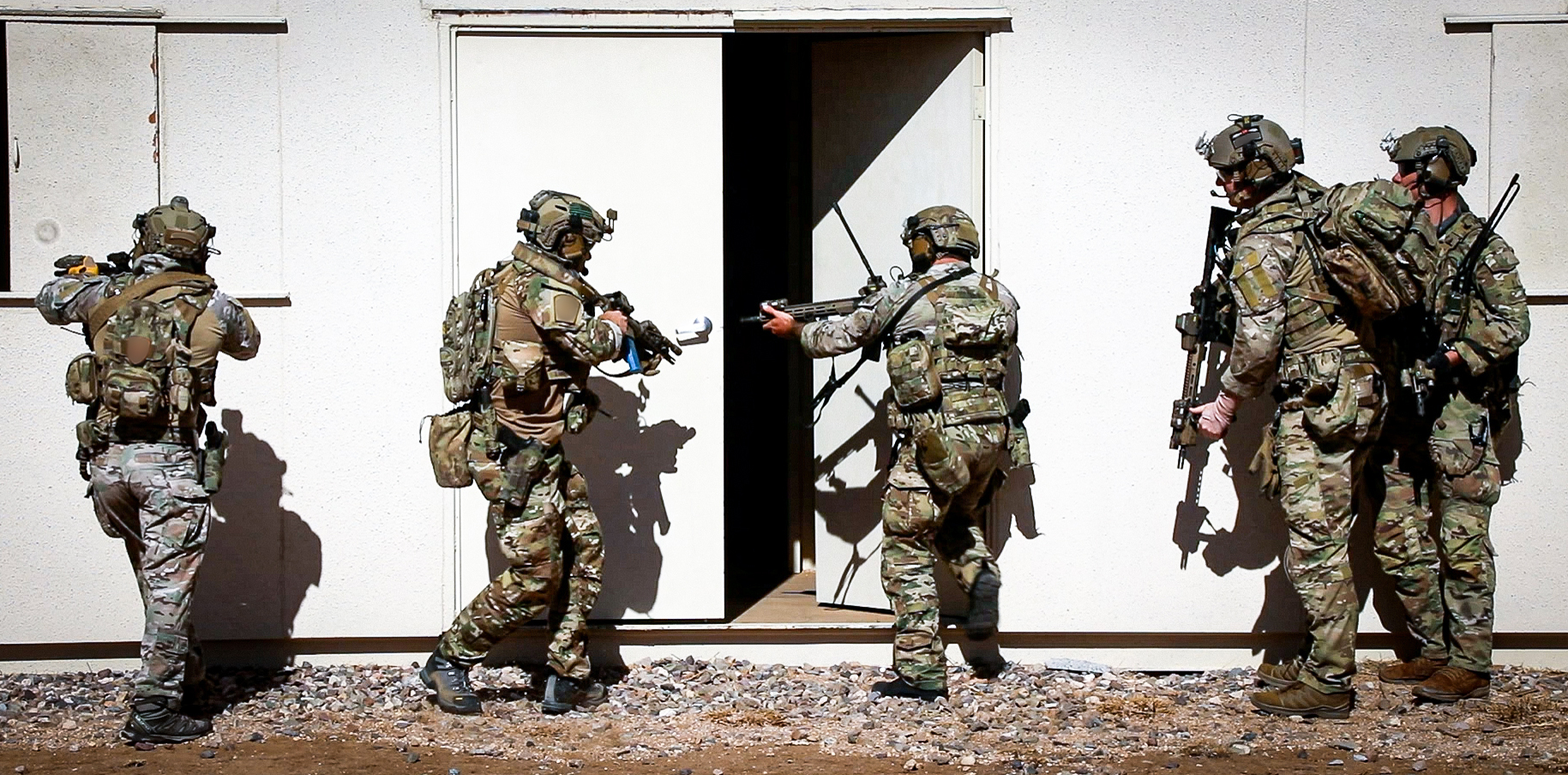
Soldiers from the Army 3rd Special Forces Group conducting joint training with BORTAC agents in OCP uniforms

BORTAC personnel wear a variety of uniforms while conducting operations. These include desert khaki or foliage colored two-piece flight suits, as well as combat uniforms in foliage, desert khaki, and Multicam. Because of the increasing prevalence of smugglers wearing camouflage, BORTAC personnel will often, when operating in conjunction with Border Patrol or CBP Air and Marine Operations, wear similar uniforms to those of the unit with which they are operating. BORTAC personnel also commonly wear plate carriers and, on occasion, ballistic helmets to protect them in the course of their operations.

== See also ==
- DEA Special Response Teams
- FBI Hostage Rescue Team
- Maritime Security Response Team
