= Special Operations Response Team =

U.S. Federal Bureau of Prisons unit

- Active: 1985 - present
- Country: United States
- Agency: Federal Bureau of Prisons
- Type: Police tactical unit
- Abbreviation: SORT

Structure
- Part-time officers: 634
- Subunits: 38

The Special Operations Response Team (SORT) is the tactical unit of the Federal Bureau of Prisons (BOP), a federal law enforcement agency under the United States Department of Justice. It's used to address unconventional and high-risk situations at American federal prisons, such as movement of high-risk or high-profile inmates, protective details for visitors, riot control within a federal prison, and assisting other law enforcement agencies during emergencies.

The BOP is responsible for maintaining the custody of anyone convicted of committing a federal crime. To achieve this goal, the BOP maintains many correctional facilities, which are divided into six regions, throughout the United States These facilities house approximately 211,195 inmates of varying security levels. Facilities are designated as either minimum, medium, maximum, or the most recent addition, supermax. To help maintain security within facilities under its control, the BOP has formed some specialized tactical and emergency response units. Operating under the direct control of the BOPs Office of Emergency Preparedness, these units consist of a Special Operations Response Team, or SORT; a Disturbance Control Team; and a Hostage Negotiation Team.

The Office of Emergency Preparedness was established in May 1990 and oversees the BOP's SORT program and coordinates emergency response capabilities. It also acts as a liaison office with other agencies during crisis situations.

== Foundation ==
The first SORT was formed in 1982 at the United States Penitentiary (USP) Leavenworth, Kansas. The team was formed as a response to the increasing level of violence being encountered in the facility. A second team came on line shortly afterward at the USP Marion, Illinois. Currently, all federal correctional complexes and higher-level security facilities are required to maintain a SORT.

== Scenarios ==
Possible scenarios that may require the deployment of a SORT are:

- Riots
- Attack on staff or inmates
- Escapes or attempted escapes
- Hostage situations
- Any terrorist or military strike on the United States

== Personnel ==
SORT members (also called operators) are selected based on a vigorous physical and mental process. All operators are selected from the host facility's staff. Each SORT member has a regular duty assignment and is assigned to the SORT on a collateral basis. SORTs will primarily operate at their host facility but are on call to respond to any incident that may occur at any BOP or federal-controlled facility. The leader of a SORT team can be of any rank, SORT teams are composed of 15+ personnel from various departments within the institution. Each team will have many specialist personnel assigned to it, such as:

- An emergency medical technician
- A certified firearms instructor
- A rappel master
- A security specialist/locksmith
- A blueprint expert
- A sniper/spotter team
- A forced entry specialist trained in the use of explosives
- A chemical agent specialist

== Training ==
SORTs receive their initial training and certification from the Office of Emergency Management, and are required to train for at least 8 hours a month. Most facilities dedicate at least 16 hours to training, with many more hours of personnel time to hone skills. Monthly training includes firearms instruction, tactical planning, emergency medical care, rappelling, physical training, riot control techniques, and other skills as deemed necessary. To maintain their certification, teams participate in an annual regional training exercise. The teams are evaluated and ranked using national standards developed by the Office of Emergency Preparedness. Teams found to be lacking in any particular areas are given remedial training and brought up to standard. Teams are required to hold at least two mock emergency exercises per year to test their response to any potential crisis situations that may arise.

All SORT members and other emergency BOP staff are equipped with work phones. If a situation develops that requires the use of the SORT, the team will be paged and will respond to the facility. In the event a large-scale emergency should arise, the BOP maintains palletized trailers of equipment at several storage areas around the country. BOP also maintains agreements with the Department of Defense (DOD) to have BOP personnel and equipment transported on DOD aircraft.

== History ==
BOP SORTs have participated in several high-profile events over the last few years. In 1991, Cuban inmates at Federal Correctional Institution (FCI) Talladega, Alabama, rioted and took several hostages. The BOP responded immediately by deploying several SORTs and received additional assistance from the FBI's Hostage Rescue Team (HRT), along with several regional FBI SWAT teams. As the situation grew tenser, the order was given to storm the facility. The assault was initiated by the HRT, and the federal tactical units were successful in regaining control of the facility.

Some of the lesser known operations that BOP SORTs have been involved in include the mass movement of inmates from FCI Miami, after the facility was damaged by Hurricane Andrew; and the resolution of inmate disturbances at FCI Oakdale, Louisiana, FCI Lawton, Oklahoma, and the USP Atlanta.

In 1992, the first Rodney King beating trial came to a close. The officers charged with using excessive force to arrest Rodney King were found not guilty. The city erupted in a spasm of violence. The city of Los Angeles was unable to cope with the rising level of anarchy in its streets and requested assistance from both the state and federal governments. The US government immediately ordered the deployment of federal troops and law enforcement agencies to the embattled city. The BOP dispatched several of its SORTs to the area, who helped maintain control of federal facilities in the area.

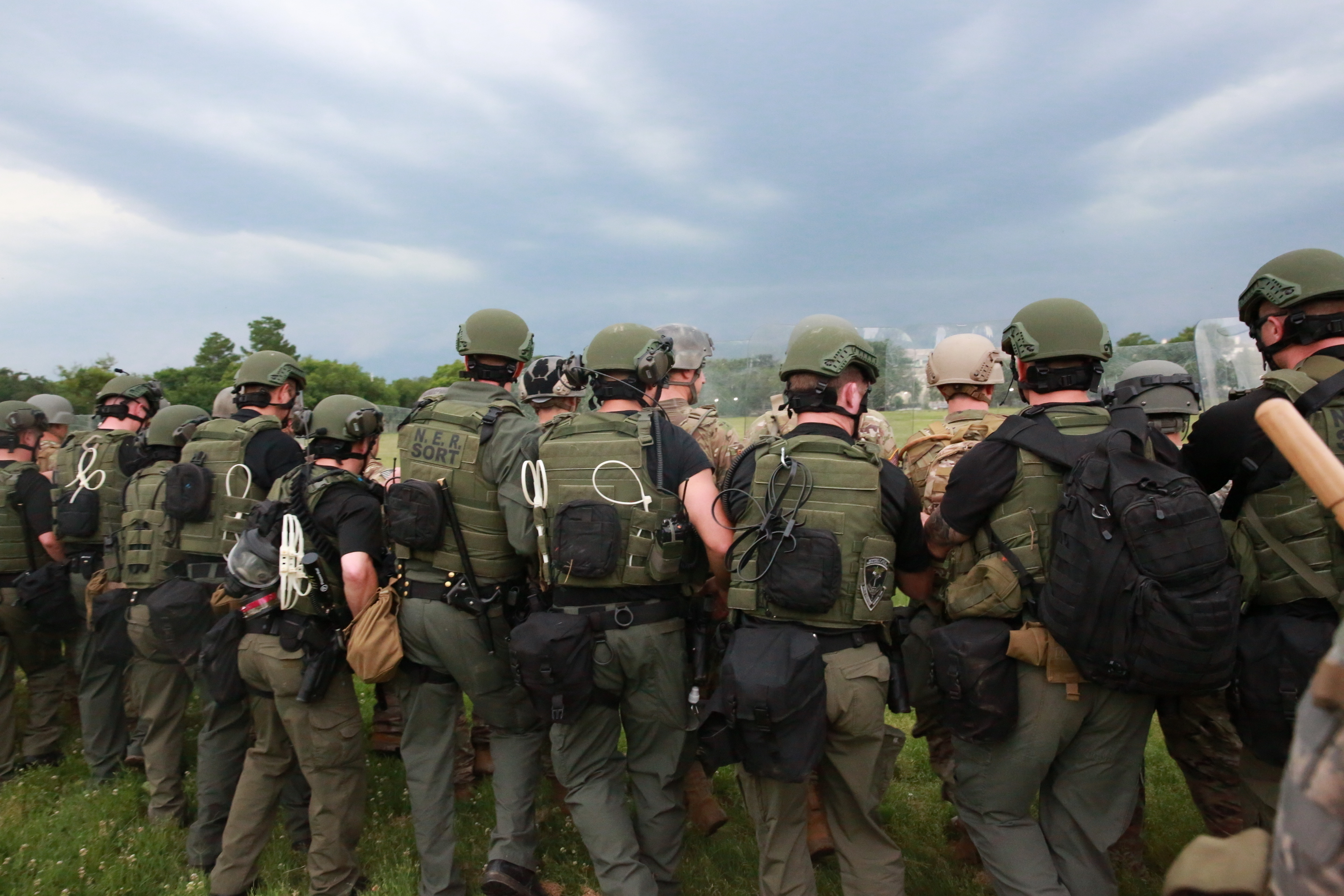
NER (Northeast Region) SORT members alongside National Guard soldiers in Washington, D.C., during the 2020 George Floyd protests.

In 2020, SORT teams deployed to American cities, including Washington, D.C., as a part of the response to the George Floyd protests in Washington, D.C. and Miami, during the June 2020 unrest that followed after the murder of George Floyd. The SORT operators in question did not wear identifying clothing or respond to questions about their affiliation. This led to some politicians and journalists decrying the use of unidentified federal law enforcement officers due to a lack of accountability. The SORTs were described by some as an "American secret police." Then-United States Attorney General William Barr defended their use.

On June 18, 2020, the Office of Inspector General issued its report on two incidents at BOP facilities involving SORT members during training exercises. During one mock exercise, the SORT deployed a flash bang grenade, a non-lethal munition intended to disorient enemies, when it exploded on a staff member, causing significant injuries requiring surgery and ongoing treatment.

== Uniform and equipment ==
SORT uniforms consist of U.S. Battle Dress uniforms, Kevlar helmets, and tactical footwear. Its equipment varies from team to team, with all teams being equipped with level IIIA body armor and some type of load-bearing vest. Additional protection is provided by using Body Bunker ballistic shields.

SORT weapons include SIG Sauer P228 or Glock 19 pistols, Colt 9mm SMGs or HK MP5 SMGs, Benelli M1 Super 90 shotguns, McMillan M86 SR Sniper rifles, 37mm gas guns, diversionary devices, and chemical munitions.
