= Border Patrol Search, Trauma, and Rescue =

Specialized unit of the United States Border Patrol

Border Patrol Search, Trauma, and Rescue Unit
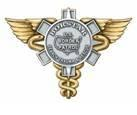
- Active: 1998 – present
- Country: United States
- Agency: United States Border Patrol
- Type: Search and rescue
- Part of: Special Operations Group
- Headquarters: El Paso, Texas
- Abbreviation: BORSTAR

Structure
- Active Personnel: 253 (2015)

The Border Patrol Search, Trauma, and Rescue Unit (BORSTAR) is a specialized unit of the United States Border Patrol for emergency search and rescue and medical response. The unit is trained in emergency search and rescue, medical evacuation (medevac), and tactical emergency medical services (TEMS) response in hazardous environments. It primarily assists injured or stranded migrants who enter the United States illegally from Mexico at remote desert locations.

The BORSTAR Headquarters is located in El Paso, Texas, and units are stationed in each southwest Border Patrol sector.

== History ==
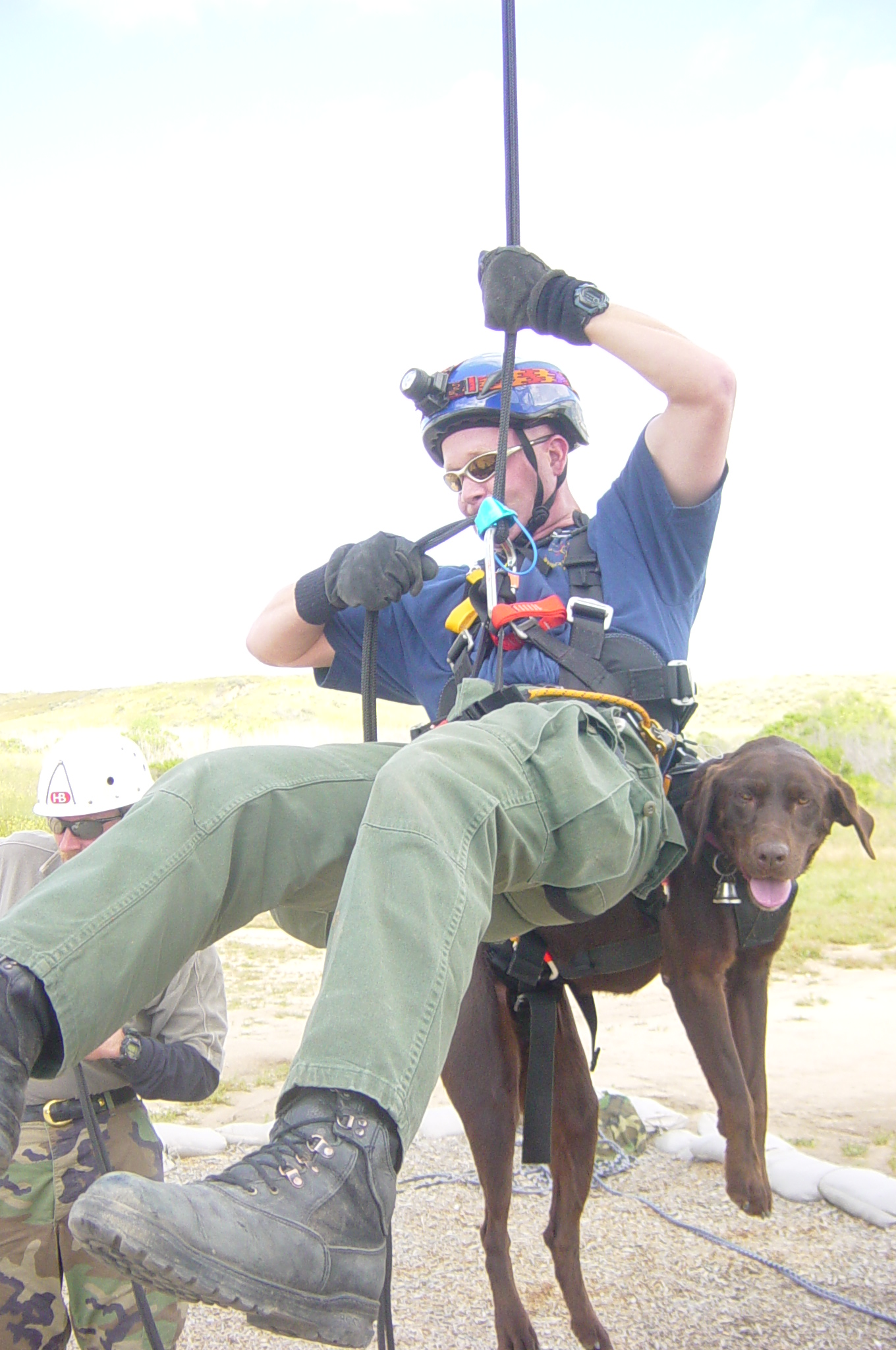
BORSTAR training, 2006

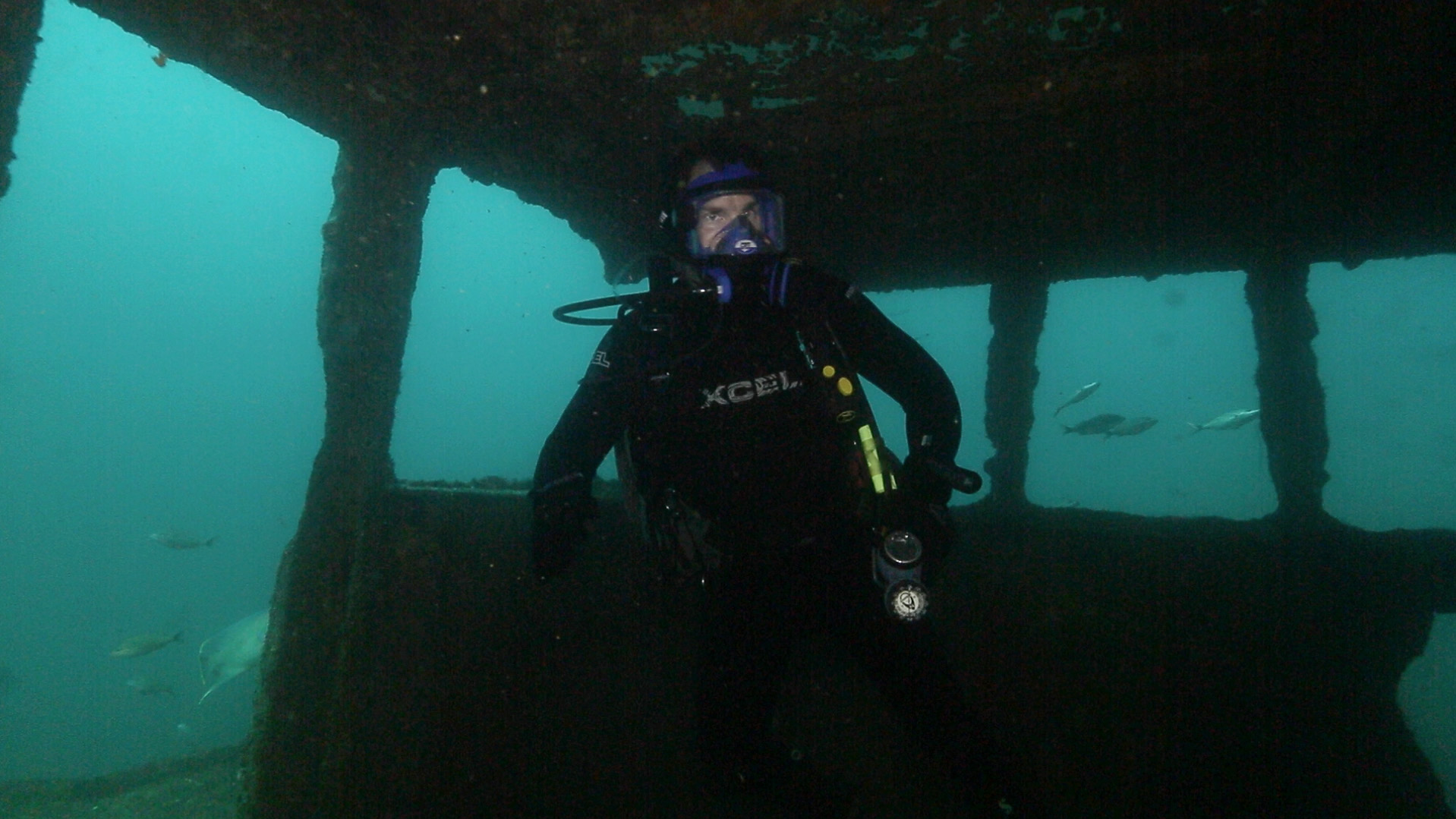
BORSTAR diver surveys the bridge of sunken ship Black Bart off the coast of Panama City, Florida.

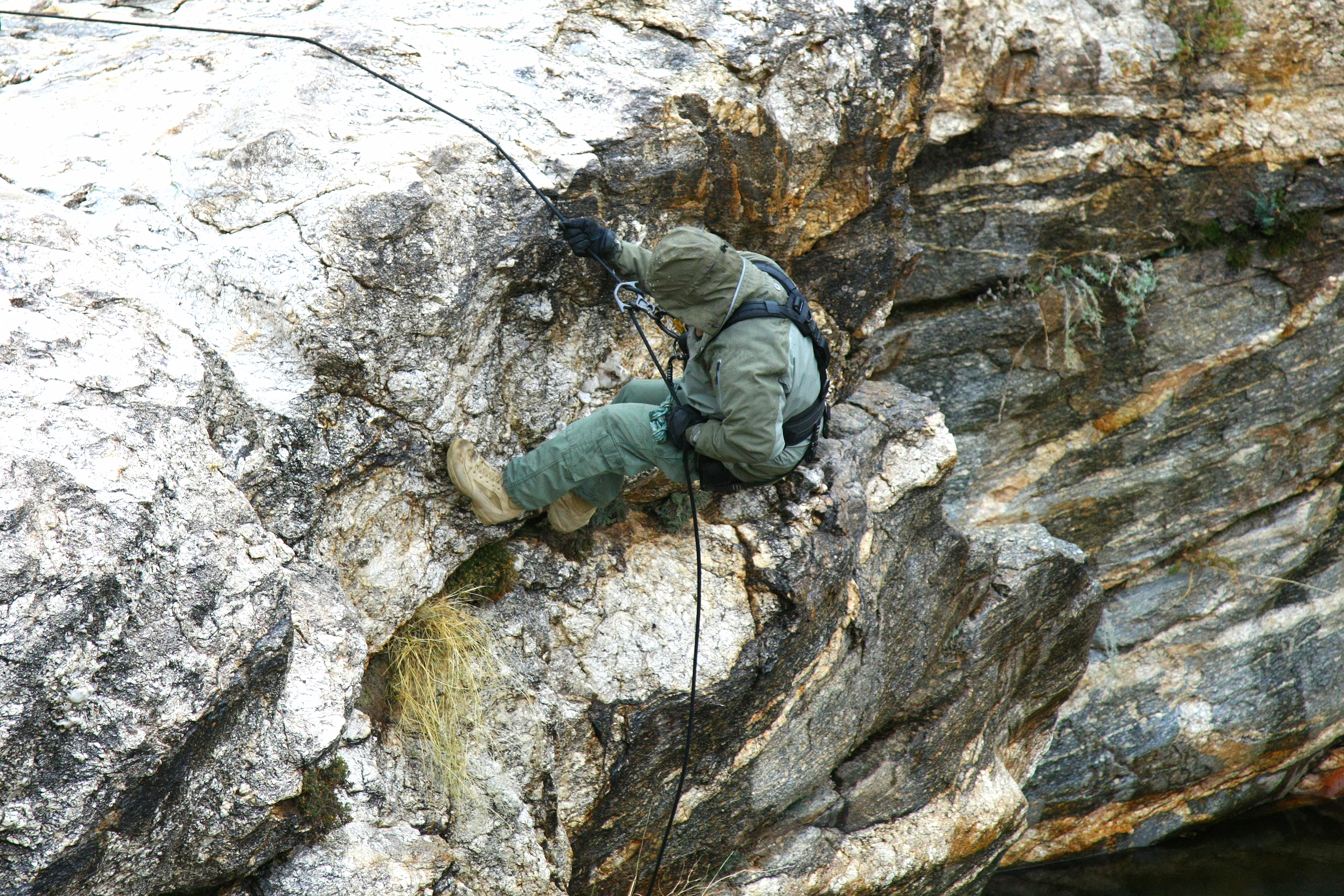
Rappelling on Mount Lemmon, 2011

Officials in the Border Patrol's San Diego Sector asked for permission to start a rescue team to help agents and civilians who needed assistance. BORSTAR was created in 1998 in response to the growing number of migrant deaths along the Mexico–United States border.

In 1999, a BORSTAR training academy opened in Tucson, Arizona, and in 2001, the unit added rescue dogs.

In 2007, BORSTAR was placed under the command of the newly formed Special Operations Group (SOG) together with the Border Patrol Tactical Unit (BORTAC).

The unit has evolved and has enhanced its capabilities to fulfill the foreign and domestic missions of DHS, CBP, and USBP.

== Training ==
BORSTAR is composed of volunteer agents from the U.S. Border Patrol. After serving two years, agents may apply to attend the five-week training course. All BORSTAR agents attend an additional six weeks of training to become certified as basic emergency medical technicians, followed by a ten-day basic tactical medicine course. BORSTAR members learn rescue techniques, land navigation, communications, teamwork, tactical medicine, swiftwater rescue, and air operations. They also obtain their basic-level certification as an Emergency Medical Technician. Some members receive additional specialized training which may include watercraft rescue, boat operations, cold weather operations, paramedic training, and SCUBA diving.

== Scope of operations ==
In addition to assisting migrants, BORSTAR units have helped hikers, motorists, and other Border Patrol agents in need of rescue. BORSTAR units have responded to FEMA requests for assistance, including Hurricane Katrina rescue operations.

The Border Patrol states that "situations vary in difficulty from simply locating victims and providing them with water to complex rescues requiring agents to rappel into remote canyons to assist victims and extract them by helicopter."
