= Operation Legend =

Police operation in the United States

- FBI info sheet about the killing of LeGend Taliferro
- Date: July 8, 2020 – January 20, 2021
- Location: United States; Cities of Albuquerque, Baltimore, Chicago, Cleveland, Detroit, Kansas City, Milwaukee, Philadelphia and St. Louis
- Type: 2020 deployment of federal forces in the United States
- Participants: United States Department of Justice: Federal Bureau of Investigation; United States Marshals Service; Drug Enforcement Administration; Bureau of Alcohol, Tobacco, Firearms and Explosives; United States Department of Homeland Security
- Arrests: 1,500

Operation Legend or Operation LeGend was a federal law enforcement operation in the United States initiated by the administration of President Donald Trump. The operation was named after four-year-old LeGend Taliferro, who was shot and killed in Kansas City, Missouri, on June 29, 2020. According to the White House, Operation Legend was implemented after President Trump began deploying federal law enforcement agents to fight violent crime in the wake of the George Floyd protests. For Operation Legend, agents from various federal agencies were deployed to aid and assist city and county law enforcement officers.

== Background ==
In the early morning hours of June 29, 2020, four-year-old LeGend Taliferro was killed while he was sleeping after his apartment was shot by gunfire. The death of Taliferro occurred during a time of increased violence in Kansas City and Missouri as a whole, with at least five children being killed in Kansas City in the first six months of 2020. On July 3, 2020, Kansas City Mayor Quinton Lucas sent a letter to the Governor Mike Parson stating that the city was "at a crisis point" regarding crime. Mayor Lucas called on Governor Parson to create a special legislative session in the Missouri General Assembly so Missouri could address the crime issue facing the city.

== Operation ==
=== Kansas City ===
Five days after Mayor Lucas's letter was sent, the United States Department of Justice announced the Operation Legend initiative on July 8, 2020, to bring federal law enforcement agents to Kansas City to assist local authorities with combatting crime. During a press conference, White House Press Secretary Kayleigh McEnany cited crime statistics in Kansas City, including a forty percent increase of homicides, stating that agents from the United States Department of Justice, the Federal Bureau of Investigation (FBI), the United States Marshals Service, the Department of Homeland Security, the Drug Enforcement Administration (DEA), and the Bureau of Alcohol, Tobacco, Firearms and Explosives (ATF) would be deployed to the city within the next ten days.

=== Expansion ===
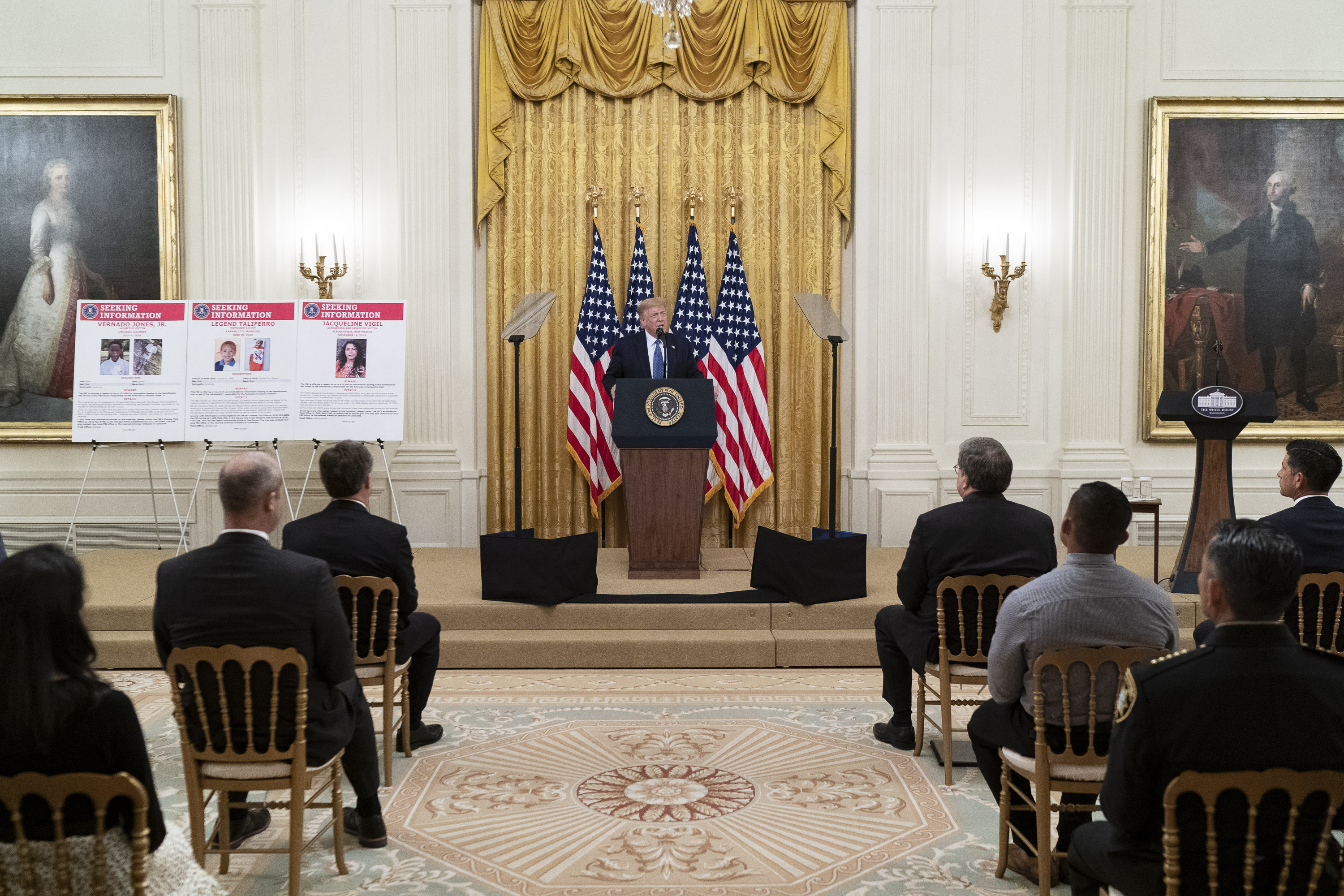
President Donald Trump announcing the expansion of Operation Legend on July 22, 2020

On July 22, 2020, President Trump announced plans to expand Operation Legend to Albuquerque, Chicago, Baltimore, and Philadelphia.

Politico relayed that the mayors of Baltimore, Chicago, and Philadelphia had not been contacted by the DHS, who "struggled to lower the temperature of protests" in Oregon where multiple officials said the influx of federal officers had heightened tensions. According to Reuters, a Department of Justice official said the operation was not related to the deployment of federal agents to ongoing protests in Portland, Oregon. Acting DHS Secretary Wolf, reported the Associated Press, "drew a distinction between the mission in Portland—to protect federal property—and the surges in Kansas City, Chicago and Albuquerque to help stop violence."

Later the same day, the White House released an event summary stating that the program would expand to Cleveland, Detroit, and Milwaukee, over the next three weeks. On August 6, 2020, it was announced that Operation Legend would also deploy to St. Louis, Missouri, and Memphis, Tennessee. On August 14, 2020, the program was again expanded to include Indianapolis, Indiana.

== Effects ==
On July 22, 2020, Attorney General William Barr announced that more than 200 people were arrested during the initial operation in Kansas City, stating "Just to give you an idea of what's possible, the FBI went in very strong into Kansas City and within two weeks we've had 200 arrests". Local authorities could not confirm the number announced by Barr, with The Kansas City Star later stating that "A Department of Justice official said the 200 arrests cited by Barr Wednesday included some dating back to December 2019, and included both state and FBI arrests in joint operations." At the time of Barr's announcement, federal agents related to Operation Legend had made only one publicly known arrest, according to NPR.

As of August 19, 2020, there have been 217 people who have been charged with a federal crime, and more than 1,000 arrests have been made in major metropolitan cities since the Department of Justice launched Operation Legend. Nearly 400 firearms have been seized by the Bureau of Alcohol, Tobacco, Firearms and Explosives.

On September 3, 2020, the Department of Justice announced that it has so far arrested more than 2,000 people, including 147 homicide suspects, as part of the sprawling, nationwide initiative to stem the tide of violent crime. Since the nationwide crackdown was announced on July 8, local and federal law enforcement officials have confiscated more than 544 firearms, seven kilos of fentanyl, 14 kilos of heroin, 12 kilos of cocaine, and 50 kilos of methamphetamine. Of the more than 2,000 suspects, 476 have been charged with federal offenses - most of them related either to firearms or drugs.

Cities have used funds made available through the program to purchase surveillance equipment.

== Arrests ==
=== Albuquerque ===
The U.S. District Attorney's Office reported that at least 19 people, as of August 31, have been charged with federal crimes under Operation Legend in Albuquerque.

On September 3, 2020, the Department of Justice released a reported the arrests of 35 people, largely on gun and drug related offenses, between July 22 and August 31. Amongst those arrested, 19 have been charged with being a felon in possession of a firearm.

=== Chicago ===
On August 19, 2020, Attorney General William Barr announced that at least 61 people have been charged with federal crimes in Chicago under Operation Legend. About half of the 61 people arrested are facing gun-related charges.

Operation Legend has resulted in more than 500 arrests in Chicago and 124 people have been charged with federal crimes, according to US Attorney General William Barr. Since the operation began, murders dropped by 50% over the previous five weeks.

=== Cleveland ===
On August 19, 2020, federal investigators working side by side with state and local law enforcement reported that 32 people have been charged with federal crimes. Of that number, 22 are facing drug trafficking charges and nine are charged with firearms violations.

As of September 3, 2020, 54 people had been charged with federal crimes since Operation Legend was expanded to Cleveland on July 29, according to Department of Justice officials.

=== Detroit ===
Federal and local law enforcement announced that Operation Legend yielded the arrest of 22 defendants being charged with federal offenses in Detroit.

=== Indianapolis ===
Federal, state and local law enforcement agencies have recovered 49 firearms from the streets of Indianapolis. They have also arrested 18 fugitives, including two fugitives for murder cases. Over 20 individuals have been federally charged. As part of Operation Legend, an individual from Columbus, Indiana was sentenced to 41 months in prison for having sold 300 guns illegally, 21 which ended up at crime scenes in Indianapolis.

=== Kansas City ===
On August 13, 2020, Ryson Ellis, a 22-year-old from Kansas City, was arrested in Tulsa and charged with the murder of LeGend Taliferro. The Jackson County, Missouri prosecutor's office says Ellis fired shots into the apartment where 4-year-old LeGend Taliferro was sleeping—hitting and killing him.

On August 21, 2020, Kansas City and federal authorities announced they have arrested 288 people, including 24 suspects connected to homicide investigations.

On August 27, 2020, three men were charged in federal court as part of Operation Legend after an armed carjacking led to a chase, and a crash that killed another driver.

The US Attorney for the Western District of Missouri, Tim Garrison, announced on Monday August 31, 2020, that authorities have made 355 arrests in Kansas City under the purview of Operation LeGend. Among those arrested, 33 were homicide cases and 62 were fugitives with either state or federal warrants for their arrest. The remaining 151 non-fugitive arrests were either supervised release violators or were referred for prosecution in state court.

=== Memphis ===
According to US Attorney, Mike Dunavant, 41 people have been arrested in Memphis, seven of them have been charged with federal crimes.

=== Milwaukee ===
Federal and local authorities in Milwaukee have arrested more than 30 suspects and have filed federal gun and drug charges against 11 people. Agents have also seized 28 firearms, a flamethrower, an unspecified amount of narcotics and thousands of dollars in cash, according to the FBI.

=== St. Louis ===
On August 14, 2020, the first arrests were announced since the start of Operation LeGend to crack down on violent crime. Federal authorities say one of the men is a suspect in the murder of a 6-year-old child that happened in St. Louis during February. Deandre White, 24, faces a federal charge for being a felon in possession of a gun. Authorities raided his house and found a weapon, ammunition, and hundreds of fentanyl pills. Troy Jackson, 28, is also charged for being a felon with a gun and intent to sell fentanyl. He was already out on parole, and on the run for murder and assault charges.

According to the U.S. Department of Justice, 89 people have been charged with federal crimes in St. Louis. A total of 44 defendants have been charged with narcotics-related offenses; 37 defendants have been charged with firearms-related offenses; and 8 defendants have been charged with other violent crimes.

== Reactions ==
In Kansas City, protests occurred against the operation on July 17, 2020, with organizers calling for fifty percent of funds for the Kansas City Police Department being diverted to housing, health and education initiatives in the city. The mother of LeGend Taliferro, Charron Powell, responded to protesters stating "Operation LeGend is to investigate murders that have been unsolved and one of those is for my 4-year-old son that did not make it to 5, ... and if you're against that, maybe you have to reevaluate your stance and your mentality to see what direction you're headed in".

New Mexico Governor Lujan Grisham stated "If the Trump administration wishes to antagonize New Mexicans and Americans with authoritarian, unnecessary and unaccountable military-style 'crackdowns', they have no business whatsoever in New Mexico."

Chicago Mayor Lori Lightfoot said the assistance would be welcome provided that it was a genuinely collaborative partnership, but clarified in a statement in reference to tactics used by federal personnel in Portland that "We don't need federal troops, we don't need unnamed, secret federal agents."

David Lapan, DHS spokesperson for the early Trump administration, expressed concern that the deployments could harm the department's reputation, expressing that "It's overly militaristic, it's being seen in partisan political terms, and it's usurping the authorities of the local law enforcement and elected officials".

Cleveland Mayor Frank G. Jackson said on July 23, 2020, that he would have a press conference the next day regarding the federal personnel being sent to Cleveland. Ohio Governor Mike DeWine claimed the operation was similar to other "healthy" anti-crime collaborations between local and federal law enforcement: "The idea of agents, people coming in where there's not the consent of people locally – that would be a problem in Ohio. I don't think that’s going to happen. We have no indication that’s going to happen". At his press conference July 24, Jackson said, "This is not Portland" and repeatedly said that combating violent crime was his goal. He nonetheless disapproved of the Justice Department informing the press before him, saying "that's not how partnerships should work".

Detroit Mayor Mike Duggan supported the use of federal agents to help address violent crime, but not protests, which he said were largely peaceful. Duggan said during a press briefing on July 23, "We have great partnerships with the U.S. Attorney, the ATF and the DEA". "I've never seen as many illegal guns on the street that we have today. If they want to have more ATF officers dealing with the illegal trafficking of guns, that would be a welcome contribution." Matthew Schneider, United States Attorney for the Eastern District of Michigan, stated that partnerships against violent crime had previously been announced and Operation Legend was simply a continuation of them: "It has nothing to do with operations that have deployed federal agents to cities like Portland, Oregon, to quell ongoing protests".

On July 24, it was reported that Trump planned to include Milwaukee in the operation, which was opposed by Tom Barrett, Mayor of Milwaukee; the Milwaukee Police Department; Josh Kaul, the Attorney General; and Lieutenant Governor Mandela Barnes. The latter two specifically denounced use of force by federal agents against protesters in Portland, Oregon. Barnes said during a call with Wisconsin Public Radio on July 24, "I maintain that this is a very ridiculous decision and this is a president that is trying to save himself ... The last thing we need is more militarized presence at a time like this, and on top of all of that, I just don't trust the president. If [Portland] was the pilot program, we're all in trouble. The mayor of Portland, the governor of Oregon and two state senators have all called for the removal of these federal officers." Wisconsin Governor Tony Evers said on July 23 that he told the president in a letter that "this type of unilateral intervention has not been requested by either the City of Milwaukee or the State and is not welcome in Wisconsin", adding: "I oppose that, and I sent the president a letter expressing my concern about sending agents to Milwaukee, or Madison, or anyplace in the state ... I have full faith and trust not only in the people in Wisconsin, but also the folks that serve in our police departments. Amping up the federal presence will, I believe, create more turmoil."

== Conclusion ==
In January 2021, Donald Trump left office after losing the 2020 U.S. Presidential Election to Joe Biden. Upon taking office, the Biden administration ordered an end to the operation. Representatives for the Department of Justice confirmed on February 1 that the program was canceled in January. The program was described as a success by federal agents involved, with the FBI officially stating:

Operation Legend was a coordinated effort with our local law enforcement and prosecutorial partners to aggressively investigate our most violent crimes. Despite the ongoing pandemic, over 6000 arrests were conducted at the local, state, and federal level nationwide, and over 2600 firearms seized. Though this operation was intended as a short-term surge of resources, our work does not stop here. Our mission to protect the American people is unending, and we will continue to build on this momentum going forward.
