= Atalante (far-right group) =

Canadian white nationalist group

- Founding leader: Raphaël Lévesque
- Leader: Raphaël Lévesque
- Founded: 2015
- Country: Canada
- Headquarters: Quebec City
- Active regions: Quebec
- Ideology: Neo-fascism; Anti-communism; Anti-Islam; Anti-immigration; Anti-capitalism; White nationalism Revolutionary nationalism
- Political position: Far-right

Atalante is a far-right, white nationalist group based in Quebec City, Canada. Their leader and founder is Raphaël Lévesque (nickname Raf Stomper), lead singer for Quebecois skinhead band Légitime violence and leader of the earlier white power skinhead group Les Stompers (English: The Stompers).

Their name comes from a French frigate that was sunk by the British in the Battle of Neuville in 1760, as part of the Seven Years' War.

== Views ==
Atalante's ideology has been described as neo-fascist, incorporating elements of revolutionary nationalism, anti-capitalism, Islamophobia, and anti-communism. The group is primarily inspired by Italian neofascist philosopher Julius Evola and the thinkers of the German Conservative Revolution.

Atalante Quebec has staged anti-immigration rallies, and pasted stickers. The group hands out food in Quebec City's underprivileged neighbourhoods but, according to a 2017 communiqué, only to people of "Neo-French origin."

The group's slogan is "Exister, c'est combattre ce qui me nie" (English: To exist is to fight that which denies me), a phrase taken from French far-right author Dominique Venner.

Atalante has repeatedly called for Remigration.

== History ==
On July 1, 2017 (the date of the 150th anniversary of Canada), Atalante held a demonstration in front of the Radio-Canada building in Quebec City.

In August 2017, the group put up anti-immigration banners around Quebec City, including one with the hashtag #remigration, referring to their desired return of recent immigrants and their descendants to their countries of origin. During the night of August 21, Atalante put up several banners around Montreal, including on the Olympic Stadium, protesting against a recent wave of asylum seekers from the United States.

In September 2017, Atalante put up posters denouncing so-called "Cultural Marxism" at Université Laval and Cégep Garneau.

In November 2017, Members of Atalante joined a protest with La Meute and Storm Alliance. Atalante unfurled a banner reading "Le Québec aux Québécois" (English: Quebec for Quebecers).

On May 23, 2018, members of Atalante entered the offices of the Vice news media in Montreal, masked. They shouted, threw documents on the ground, and intimidated journalist Simon Coutu, who had written about them. On June 18, 2018, Raphaël Lévesque was arrested in connection with this event. He was released that same day upon signing a promise to appear. He was meant to present himself to the Palais de justice in Montreal to be formally tried with breaking and entering, mischief, and intimidation of Simon Coutu. However, he did not appear at the Palais de justice for his hearing and his case was deferred until September 28, 2018. On June 10, 2020, Lévesque was cleared of all charges.

On December 19, 2018, an anonymous anti-fascist collective published a list of all the members of Atalante, outlining the links between the Quebecois group, the Italian neo-fascist group CasaPound, and the French neo-fascist group Social Bastion.

== See also ==
- Identitarian movement
- Illegal immigration to Canada
- La Meute
- Ultranationalism
