= MV Sun Sea incident =

2010 Sri Lankan Tamil refugee event in Canada

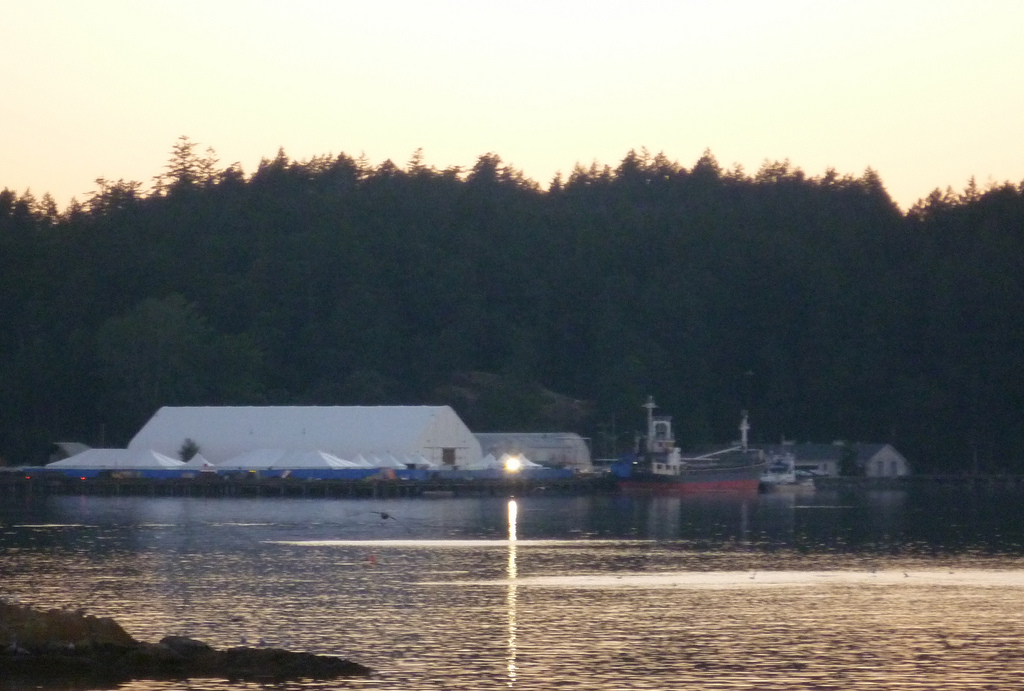
MV Sun Sea in Esquimalt Harbour

MV Sun Sea was a Thai cargo ship that brought 492 Sri Lankan Tamils into British Columbia, Canada in August 2010. Following their arrival, the passengers—seeking refuge in Canada after the end of the Sri Lankan Civil War in 2009—were transferred to detention facilities in the Lower Mainland, for which the Canadian government faced criticism from various advocacy groups.

== Arrival ==
The MV Sun Sea was tracked by the United States and Canada starting in June 2010 to anticipate where the ship would arrive. It was intercepted off the coast of British Columbia on August 12, 2010, and boarded by Canadian authorities. Escorted by HMCS Winnipeg and HMCS Whitehorse, it docked at CFB Esquimalt on August 13. 492 Sri Lankan asylum seekers (including 380 men, 63 women, and 49 minors) were on board, having left from Thailand on a three-month voyage. All made refugee claims due to violence in Sri Lanka and the Sri Lankan Civil War.

On August 14 and 15, the adult migrants were transferred to "accommodation and detention facilities" in the Lower Mainland, while minors were taken to low-risk facilities, with their mothers if they were accompanied.

Officials from the Harper government, including public safety minister Vic Toews, associated the migrants with the recently defeated Liberation Tigers of Tamil Eelam and suggested that some may have been terrorists. The asylum seekers were therefore detained for several months or longer; the Tamil Tigers have been classed as a terrorist organization since 2006 for use of child soldiers and suicide bombers.

== Aftermath ==
In February 2011, the incident was estimated to have cost the federal government $25 million.

On February 10, 2011, Amnesty International Canada, the Canadian Council for Refugees, the Canadian Tamil Congress, and the International Civil Liberties Monitoring Group criticized "the government's aggressive efforts to keep the passengers of the MV Sun Sea in detention," claiming:

Most refugee claimants are not detained on arrival in Canada, and those that are detained are usually released within a matter of days or weeks. In the case of the MV Sun Sea passengers, however, the government has been demanding more proofs of identity than usual, investing significant energy and resources in a search for adverse information about the passengers, advancing weak arguments for inadmissibility based on tenuous alleged connections with the Liberation Tigers of Tamil Eelam (LTTE), vigorously opposing release by the Immigration and Refugee Board, and contesting orders of release in the Federal Court, even in cases involving children.

In 2012, Prime Minister Stephen Harper gave Thailand $12 million to battle human smuggling operations, and the government toughened immigration laws and penalties on human smugglers. Six suspects—two Canadians and four Sri Lankans—were charged in connection with the case.

In May 2018, Public Works and Government Services of Canada issued a Letter of Interest for vessel disposal scheduled to be completed by March 31, 2019. As of August 2019, the vessel was moved to the Nanaimo Shipyard. The disposal contract was awarded to Canadian Maritime Engineering of Victoria, British Columbia for scrapping. Ship-breaking was completed in December 2019.

=== Passengers ===
As of May 18, 2012, the majority of the passengers had been released, with refugee claims in progress. Two were in police custody, three were in Canada Border Services Agency detention, nineteen had been given deportation orders for alleged crimes, six had been accepted as refugees, and six had had their claims rejected.

At least one of the passengers from Sun Sea who was deported from Canada was detained and tortured by Sri Lankan authorities. In July 2011, Sathyapavan Aseervatham, one of the passengers on Sun Sea, was deported from Canada to Sri Lanka, where he was arrested by authorities upon his arrival and detained for over one year. After his release from custody, Aseervatham provided an affidavit to his Canadian lawyer outlining the physical and psychological torture he suffered while detained in a Sri Lankan prison. This affidavit was provided to the Refugee Protection Division in private proceedings for other Sun Sea migrant hearings. It was later discovered that Canadian immigration authorities had shared this confidential affidavit with the Sri Lankan authorities who allegedly tortured Aseervatham. He was subsequently killed in Sri Lanka when an unknown motorist struck him on the street.

As of 22 July 2015, 228 Sun Sea passengers had been accepted as refugees, while 116 had been rejected and 20 were terminated or withdrawn.

Kirushna Kumar Kanagaratnam was a passenger who was murdered late in 2015, being one of a number of men killed by serial killer Bruce McArthur in Toronto. His refugee claim had been denied.

As of 2026, some asylum seekers were still fighting for legal protection in Canada. Kugatheeswaran Thuraisinkam had his initial refugee claim refused in 2012. In March 2026, he applied to the court for a stay of removal, arguing that his former counsel from previous appeals was not competent, did not prepare him for his claim, did not meet with him prior to his refugee hearing, and did not submit evidence of persecution of MV Sun Sea returnees being persecuted by Sri Lankan authorities for his risk assessment application. On April 12 2026, he was granted a stay of deportation, with the court ruling that Canadian officials did not assess the risk to him returning to Sri Lanka.

== See also ==
- Komagata Maru incident
- Roxham Road
- Sri Lankan Tamil diaspora
