= Illegal immigration to Canada =

Migrant limits

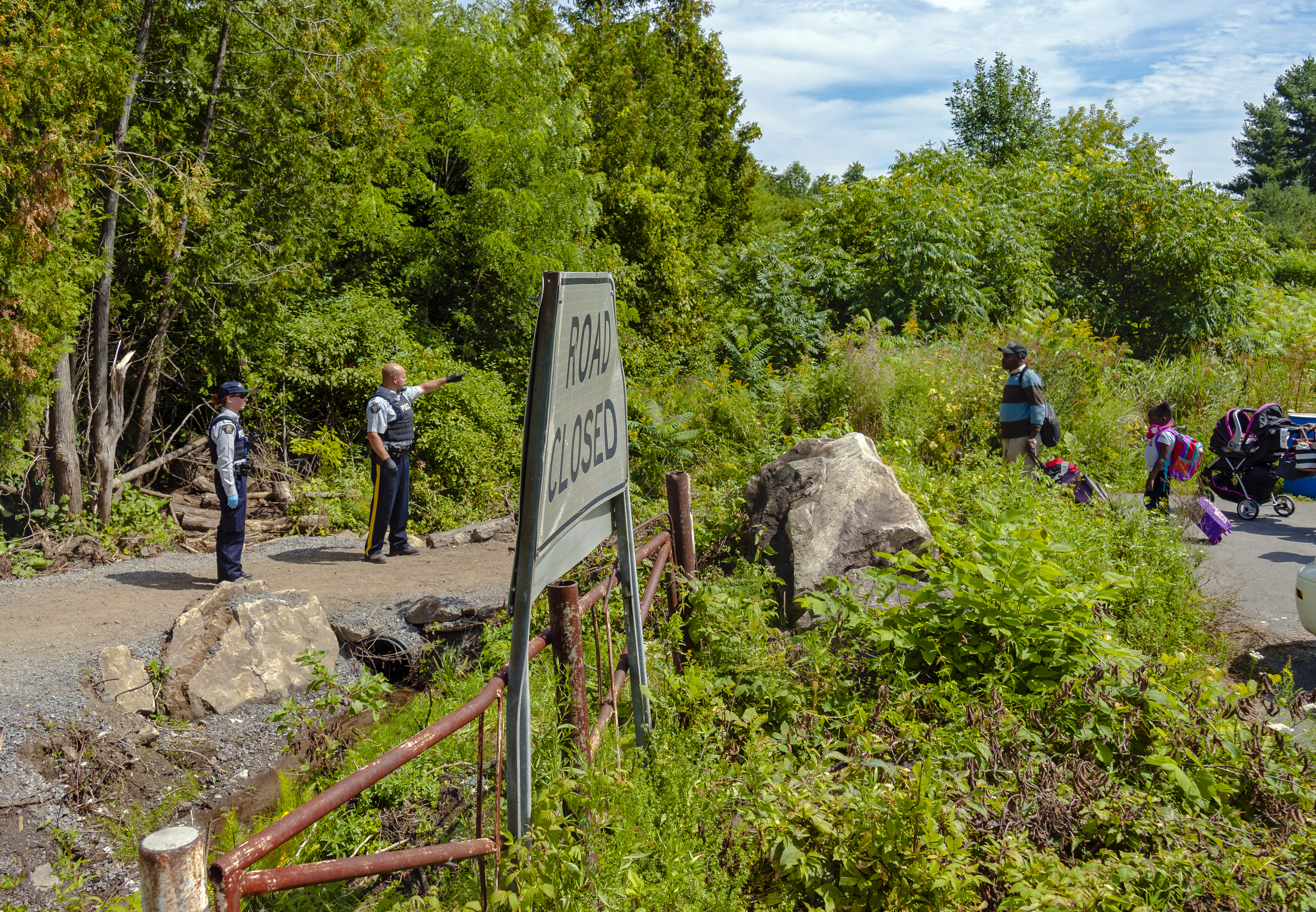
RCMP constables warn people about to enter Canada from Champlain, New York, that they are entering Canada outside an official entry point and must present themselves to Lacolle Border Crossing.

Illegal immigration to Canada is the act of a person who is not a Canadian citizen or permanent resident entering or remaining in Canada in a manner contrary to the Immigration and Refugee Protection Act and its associated regulations. That includes persons who entered Canada on a travel visa but remained beyond the period of stay specified as well as persons who entered Canada without presenting themselves at a port of entry.

Canada is a signatory of the United Nations' 1951 Convention Relating to the Status of Refugees and its 1967 Protocol, which forbids imposition of penalties on refugees who may have entered in contravention to national laws in order to seek protection; but that applies only to claimants while their case is being processed and to persons formally recognized as refugees.

== Terminology ==
The use of the term irregular or illegal is disputed when referring to the act of crossing the Canada–United States border outside of a point of entry (POE) to claim asylum.

Entering Canada outside of a POE is not an offence under the Criminal Code or Immigration and Refugee Protection Act (IRPA); regulations under IRPA require only for a person seeking to enter Canada outside a POE to "appear without delay" at the nearest entry point. Entering Canada outside of a port of entry may represent an unlawful act, but section 133 of IRPA requires charges related to any offences associated with entering Canada to be stayed while an entrant's claim is being processed in accordance with the Convention Relating to the Status of Refugees. If the Canadian government grants refugee status, any charges are stayed permanently. Claimants may face charges for other unlawful activity, or background checks may determine the claimant has a criminal history or presents a national security risk, which are outside the scope of the section 133 staying of charges and may result in denial of a claim.

The Government of Canada, including the Immigration and Refugee Board (IRB), use the term irregular to refer to these border crossings. Refugee organizations, the Liberal Party of Canada, and the New Democratic Party also use that term. The Conservative Party of Canada, in contrast, use the term illegal, with the justification that entering outside of a port of entry is a violation of the Customs Act. The Royal Canadian Mounted Police use neither word, instead using the term interceptions.

== Illegal immigration ==
Canada is signatory to the 1951 UN Convention Relating to the Status of Refugees, and within Canada, the Immigration and Refugee Protection Act (IRPA) is the legislation that governs the flow of people.

The IRPA, established in 2003, outlines the ruling, laws, and procedures associated with immigrants in Canada. It provides officers of the Canada Border Services Agency (CBSA) with the authority to detain permanent residents and foreign nationals if any of the individuals have violated the rulings of the Act. Roughly 12,600 individuals who were living in Canada including 1,900 criminals who violated the Act and either posed a high risk to Canada or were illegal immigrants who were deported in the year of 2006–07.

Article 31 of the UN Refugee Convention says that receiving countries may not penalize refugees for how they enter a country as long as they present themselves "without delay" to authorities and show "good cause" for their presence. Illegal entry is not an offence in Canada's Criminal Code, but Immigration and Refugee Protection Regulations 27 (2) says that anyone who does not enter at a port of entry must check in "without delay" at a border point. As clarified by James Hathaway, founding director of the University of Michigan's program in refugee and asylum law, "If someone a) comes forward voluntarily, and b) explains that the reason they crossed the border illegally was they were looking for protection, it's clear as a bell: You may not under any circumstance penalize them". Asylum seekers would be considered in violation of the IRPA if they cross at an unofficial border point, do not promptly go to a port of entry, and do not file a refugee claim. In addition to potential criminal charges, asylum seekers would have their cases rejected.

== Illegal immigration in Quebec ==
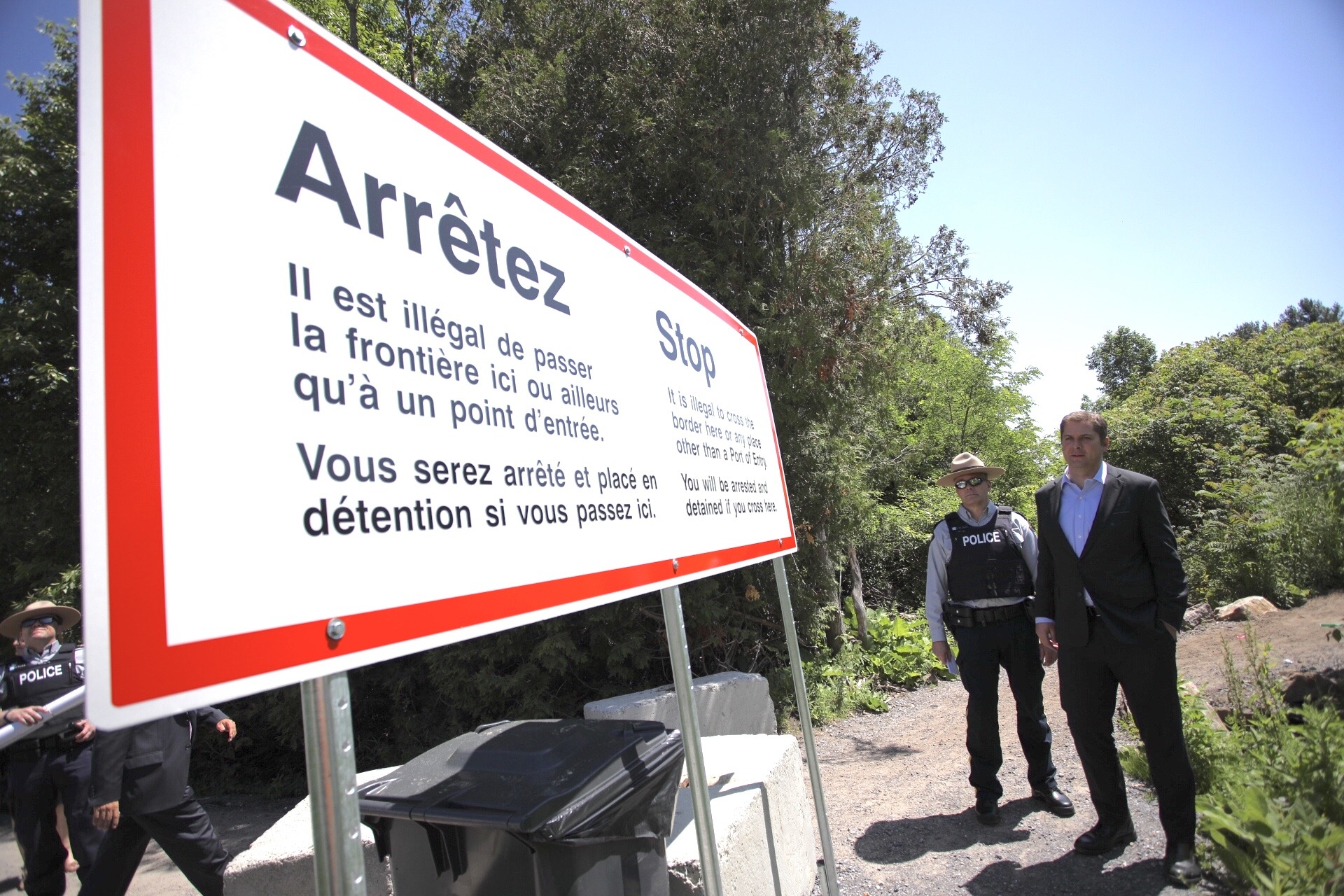
Andrew Scheer, leader of the opposition Conservative Party, touring the Roxham Road crossing in 2018

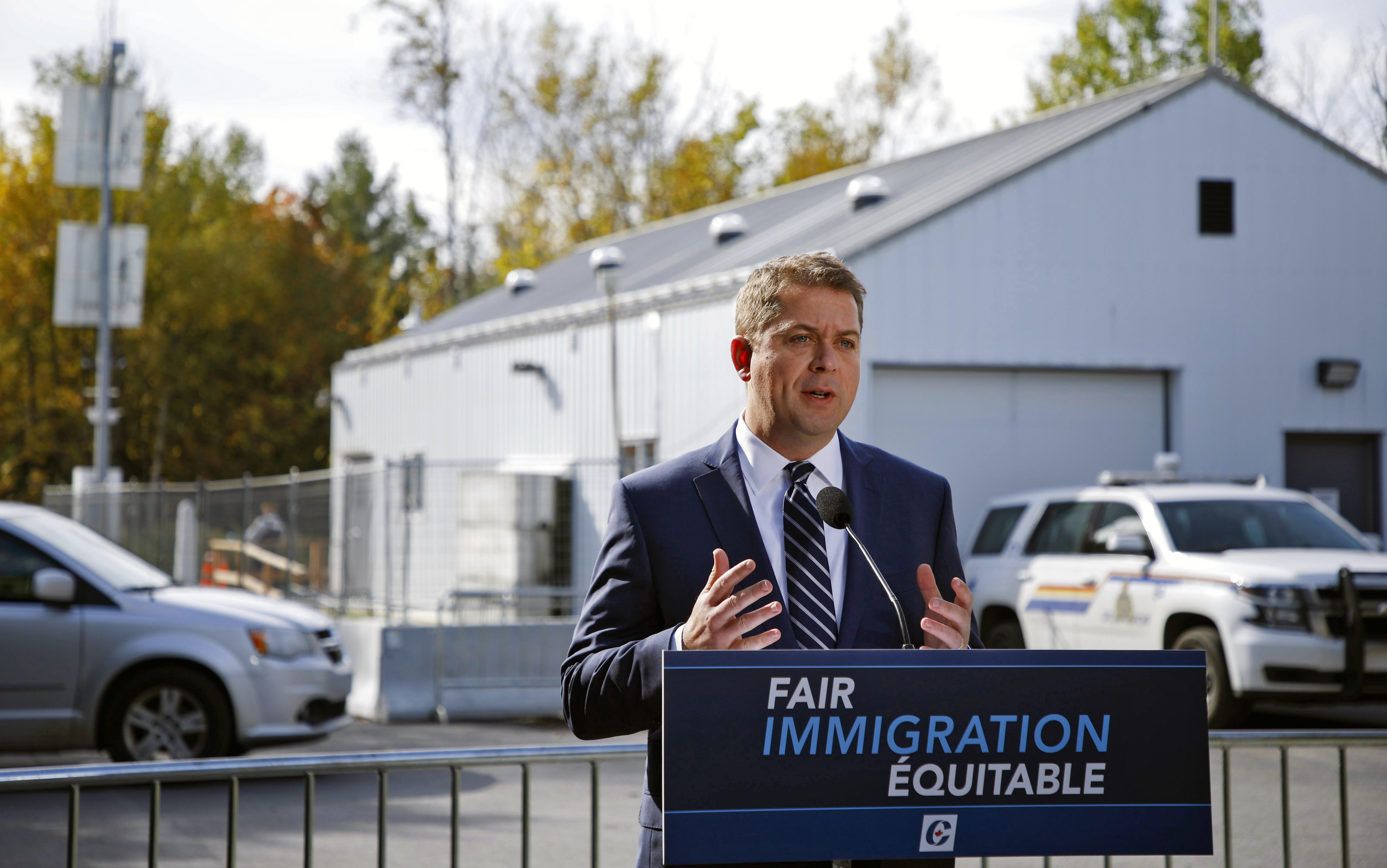
Scheer speaking at Roxham Road in October 2019

Politicians in Quebec have raised complaints. François Legault, then leader of the Coalition Avenir Québec (CAQ), said in August 2017 that the federal government was being "completely irresponsible" and allowing the border to become a "sieve". Quebec premier Philippe Couillard criticized Legault's calls for tighter border controls as intemperate, saying they demonstrated "a sheer lack of leadership."

Quebec's Official Opposition, the Parti Québécois, had also raised questions about the province's capacity to absorb the refugee influx, but had not gone as far as Legault had in calling for a more restrictive border policy. But in April 2018, as it was reported that the amount of refugees crossing at Roxham had increased by 2,000 over the same period the preceding year, its leader, Jean-François Lisée, told reporters before a party caucus session that a fence should be built at the site. "We have the best known irregular road in the world," he complained. "We have several good fence builders in Quebec, so we're spoiled for choice." He suggested it could be paid for by "the Mexicans", a joking reference to the similar barrier being built by the Trump administration on the U.S.–Mexico border.

All the province's other party heads condemned the suggestion, as well as the United Nations High Commissioner for Refugees, which called it "legally and morally wrong". Lisée later qualified his remarks by suggesting a line of trees or a police presence would be sufficient; after being reminded he had used the word "fence" he said one like those found around schools would be sufficient. His proposal was echoed by Toronto Sun columnist Anthony Furey a month later, who went further, suggesting an actual wall at the site for a few years.

On Canada Day 2017, members of the Quebec far-right groups La Meute and Storm Alliance, who had been discreetly observing the crossings for some time beforehand, staged a small protest at the Canadian side of Roxham Road, arguing that members of terrorist groups and criminals were being allowed into Canada there. A smaller group of pro-migrant protestors counterdemonstrated, with the RCMP and Sûreté du Québec keeping the two groups apart. By May 2018, two more such protests had been held, with the location shifting to the encampment nearer Lacolle and both sides attracting more supporters; Canadian activist Jaggi Singh was arrested and charged with assault on an officer at those protests after he led a group of demonstrators onto the A-15 near the Montée Guay interchange with the intent of blocking traffic, an action which delayed the arrival of the far-right protesters.

For 2018, the IRB reported 20,607 total asylum applications from irregular entrants. Of those, 18,215, or 88 percent, came via Roxham Road. The largest portion that year were the 7,585, or 42 percent, from Nigeria. Haitians dropped to 585, roughly a tenth of their 2017 total; the planned revocation of TPS late in 2017 was stayed pending litigation and almost a year later a U.S. federal judge enjoined the Trump administration from doing so. Over a thousand Colombians entered at Roxham, as well. The IRB accepted 3,307 of the applicants who crossed irregularly, improving its rate to 16 percent of the total.

During the 2022 Quebec general election Conservative Party of Quebec leader Éric Duhaime talked about the possibility of building a wall in Roxham Road to stop Illegal immigration.

== Statistics ==
From January 2017 to March 2018, the Royal Canadian Mounted Police intercepted 25,645 people crossing the border into Canada illegally. Public Safety Canada estimated that another 2,500 came across in April 2018 for a total of just over 28,000, of which 1,000 had been removed from Canada. Federal government ministers expected that "close to 90 per cent" of asylum claimants would be rejected.

The last audit of the Canadian population was performed in 2004 that indicated approximately 36,000 more individuals over a span of 6 years became illegal residents within Canada. The statistics are considered inaccurate because Canada does not record the information of illegal individuals leaving the country, but it is the last authentic value provided. A federal government draft report from 2001 included an estimate of 100,000 illegal immigrants then residing in Canada.

In the 1980s, large numbers of Brazilian foreign nationals would arrive in Canada claiming refugee statuses. They would then reside until the end of their refugee process, which allowed them to study, work, and collect social benefits. Canada noticed the large trend and imposed a requirement on Brazilian foreign nationals in 1987 to obtain a visa to arrive in Canada, which made it a little more difficult for many to immigrate. During their stay, the foreign nationals would develop the skills to pass the Canadian immigration tests and become Canadian legal citizens. Those who would not pass the citizenship tests would either leave back to Brazil or continue to live as illegal residents.

In 2008, Auditor General of Canada Sheila Fraser found that the Canada Border Services Agency (CBSA) had lost track of 41,000 individuals who had been ordered deported. In some cases, individuals can be allowed a temporary access into Canada with a Temporary Resident Permit as long as they do not pose an obvious threat to Canadians. The permit can be issued by the CBSA or a border service officer for a cost of $200 per permit; the CBSA issued 13,412 permits in 2006. Permits allow legal residency for a period ranging from one day to three years. During this time period, the legal documents are gathered for individuals to be deported back to the country they emigrated from. This procedure at times could create challenges such as retrieving the legal documentation for deporting and so Temporary Resident Permits are provided the time for such obstacles to be overcome efficient and effectively.

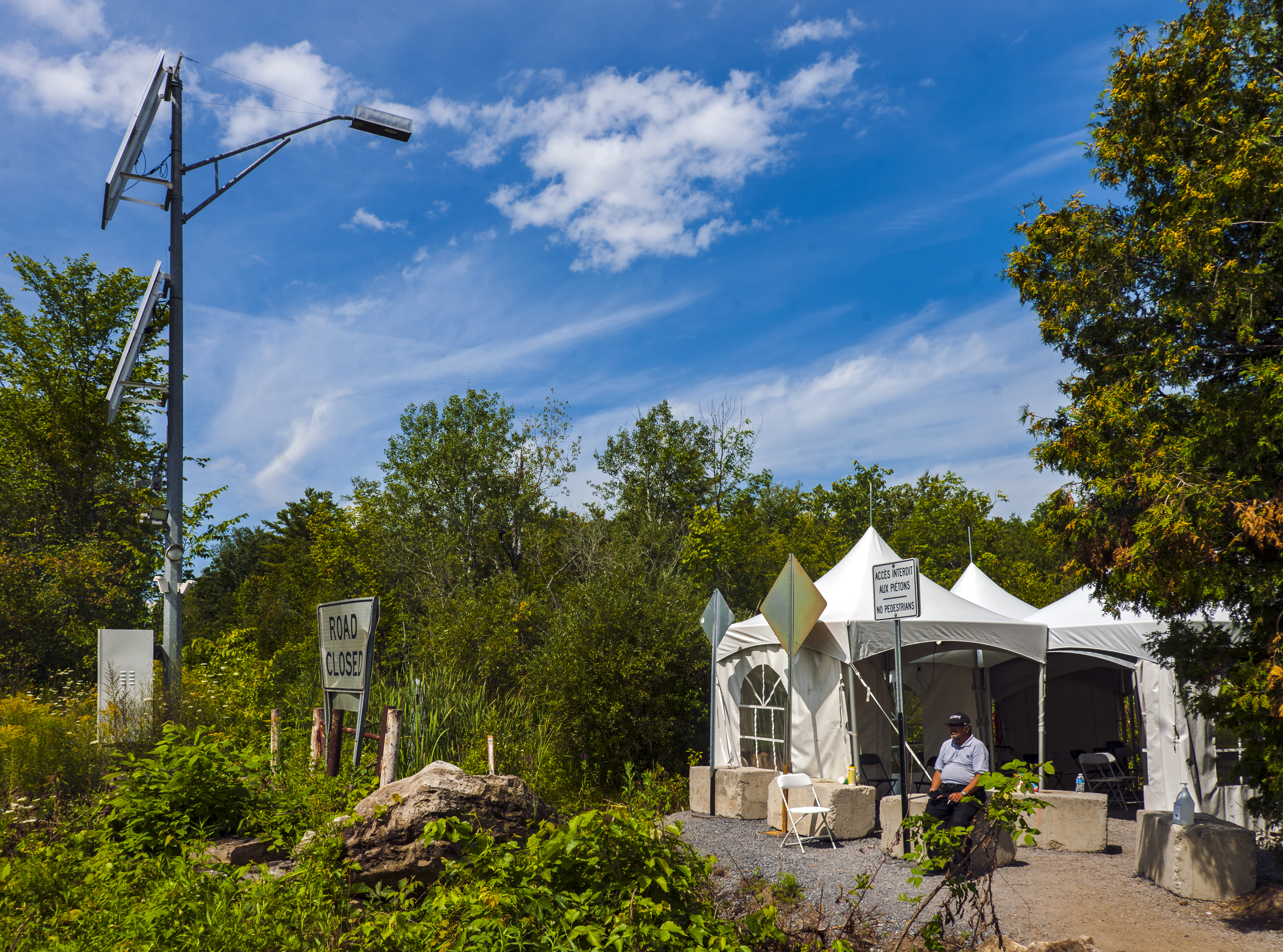
Temporary facilities for processing asylum seekers at border between Lacolle, Quebec and Champlain, New York, in 2017

In 2017, after US President Donald Trump had enforced American laws against illegal immigration in the US immigrants leaving the US and entering Canada increased. Quebec saw 75% of the resulting crossings from the US for Canada, and Programme régional d’accueil et d’intégration des demandeurs d’asile (PRAIDA) helped 1,174 asylum seekers in July 2017 compared to the 180 people during the previous year. Montreal had to repurpose its Olympic Stadium to house the immigrants.

=== Public opinion ===
A 2007 poll conducted for Citizenship and Immigration Canada of 1,200 telephone interviews of adult Canadians gathered feedback on positive and negative opinions regarding immigrants settled in Canada. Among residents, most believed that only individuals who migrate legally should be allowed to remain. Two thirds of Canadians wanted any illegal resident of Canada to be deported. In 2007, in Quebec that statistic reached a level of 70% whereby individuals stated that "reasonable accommodations" should be made for illegal immigrants rather than simply deporting them.

In 2018, an Angus Reid Institute poll, found that two thirds (67%) of those polled think that the situation constitutes a "crisis" and that Canada's "ability to handle the situation is at a limit." Fifty-six per cent of respondents who voted Liberal in the 2015 election and 55% of NDP supporters agreed that the matter had reached a crisis level, and 87% of respondents who voted for the Conservatives in the last election called it a crisis. Six in ten respondents also told the firm that Canada is "too generous" toward would-be refugees, a spike of 5% since the question was asked a year earlier.
