= Roxham Road =

Path from the US used for irregular entry to Canada by refugee claimants

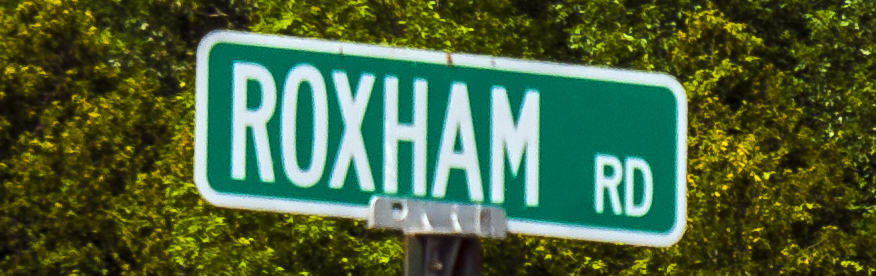
- Rang Roxham
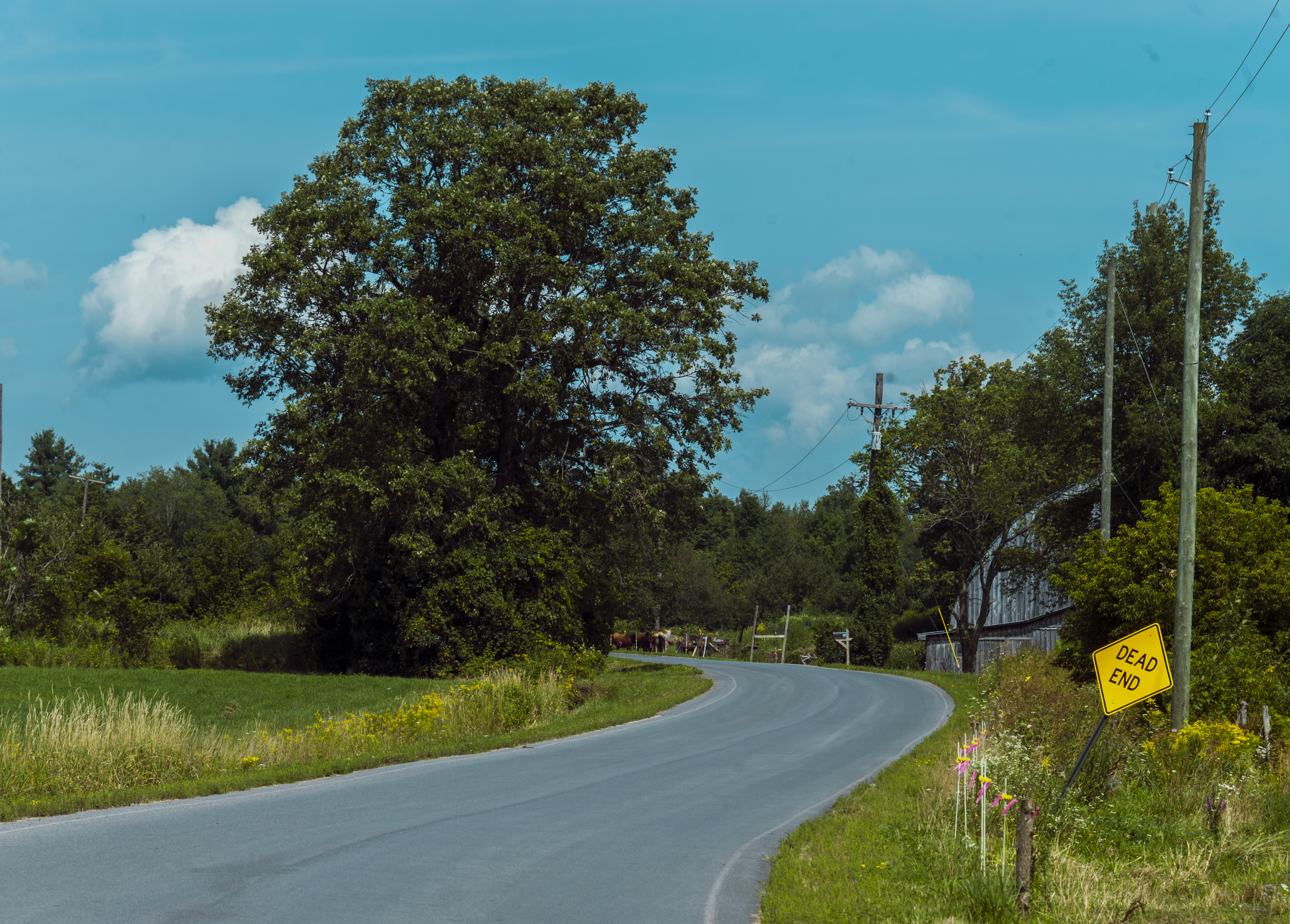
- Roxham Road near south end during summer 2017
- Namesake: Settlement midway along road
- Owner: Town of Champlain (US); Les Jardins-de-Napierville Regional County Municipality (Canada)
- Length: 5 mi (8.0 km)
- Addresses: 1–126 (US); 127–339 (Canada)
- Location: Champlain, NY, USA; Saint-Bernard-de-Lacolle, QC, Canada
- Postal code: 12919 (US); J0J 1V0 (Canada)
- Coordinates: 45.0071°N 73.5172°W
- South end: North Star Road
- North end: Chemin Pleasant Valley ( Quebec Route 202)

Other
- Known for: Use by immigrants to enter Canada irregularly and seek asylum

Roxham Road (Note: The current U.S. Geological Survey 7 1/2-minute topographic quadrangle map identifies the street as Clark Road, the name of a past resident of the area, as shown on an 1869 map, but no other map has used this name.) (French: chemin Roxham) is a 5-mile (8.0 km) rural road from the former hamlet of Perry Mills in the town of Champlain, New York, United States, generally north to the vicinity of the former hamlet of Bogton, in the municipality of Saint-Bernard-de-Lacolle, Quebec, Canada. It has existed since the early 19th century, before the Canada–United States border was formally established along the 45th parallel north (Note: Due to the limitations of 18th-century surveying technology, an errant consensus among most of the joint survey team and interpersonal difficulties among them, the Collins–Valentine line, the accepted border under the Webster-Ashburton Treaty actually runs as much as 1,375 feet (419 m) north of 45ºN along this segment.) between the St. Lawrence and Connecticut rivers. For most of its length it is a rural two-lane blacktop; north of Parc Safari, it is also part of Quebec Route 202.

For most of its history, it was possible to freely cross the border through Roxham Road, since it largely carried local traffic. Canada established a small customs station just north of the border; the U.S. never followed suit, leaving Roxham an uncontrolled border crossing, even after Canada closed its customs station in the 1950s. That ended when Canadian authorities decided, in advance of the 1976 Summer Olympics in Montreal, to barricade all the uncontrolled land border crossings between Quebec and New York, as well as the neighboring U.S. state of Vermont. Since then Roxham has officially been a dead end in both directions at the border.

Until March 25, 2023, Roxham Road was a key irregular border crossing for people who were in the United States and wished to apply for asylum in Canada. This was because of a loophole in the Safe Third Country Agreement between Canada and the United States that did not provide for the return to the United States of people claiming asylum in Canada if they entered Canada at a place other than an official border crossing. Beginning in 2017, more than 90 percent of those who irregularly entered Canada seeking asylum did so through Roxham Road, making it a metonym for the complications of Canada's immigration policies. Housing the asylum seekers required building facilities at the border, a camp nearby (and then in Montreal's Olympic Stadium) at considerable expense to the Canadian government, and led to anti-immigration groups protesting near the border crossing. Under a 2022 change to the agreement that took effect at 12:01 a.m. on March 25, 2023, that is no longer the case for most (though not all) such people who make such a claim within 14 days of entry into Canada. The 2023 implementation of this protocol amending the agreement was seen as likely to stem the growth that had taken place since 2017 (other than during the pandemic shutdown of March 2020 to November 2021) of Roxham Road being the entry point into Canada of large numbers of people seeking asylum status. Some of those individuals had been awaiting a decision on their immigration status in the U.S. and feared a negative outcome due to stricter immigration policies of Donald Trump's presidential administration, but many had just briefly passed through the U.S. to get to Canada, began entering Canada through Roxham in order to seek political asylum there. Later, immigrants began coming to the United States specifically to make the crossing at Roxham and apply for asylum in Canada, leading to criticism of Prime Minister Justin Trudeau's government for its apparent failure to enforce Canadian immigration law. In 2023, the Roxham crossing was closed permanently. During the time it was widely used as an unofficial border crossing, more than 100,000 asylum seekers passed through it.

== Route description ==
In both countries, Roxham runs generally north-south. Its southern portions pass through mostly wooded lands, which give way to farmland after Route 202 joins it north of Parc Safari.

=== New York ===
Roxham Road begins in the northwest corner of the town of Champlain, at a three-way intersection with North Star Road in the hamlet of Perry Mills, the first intersection along North Star, 700 feet (210 m) west of where it forks off from Perry Mills Road (Clinton County Route 17). A minor paved road, Roxham heads due north for 400 feet (120 m), then veers northwest, passing through fields and wooded areas interspersed with homes.

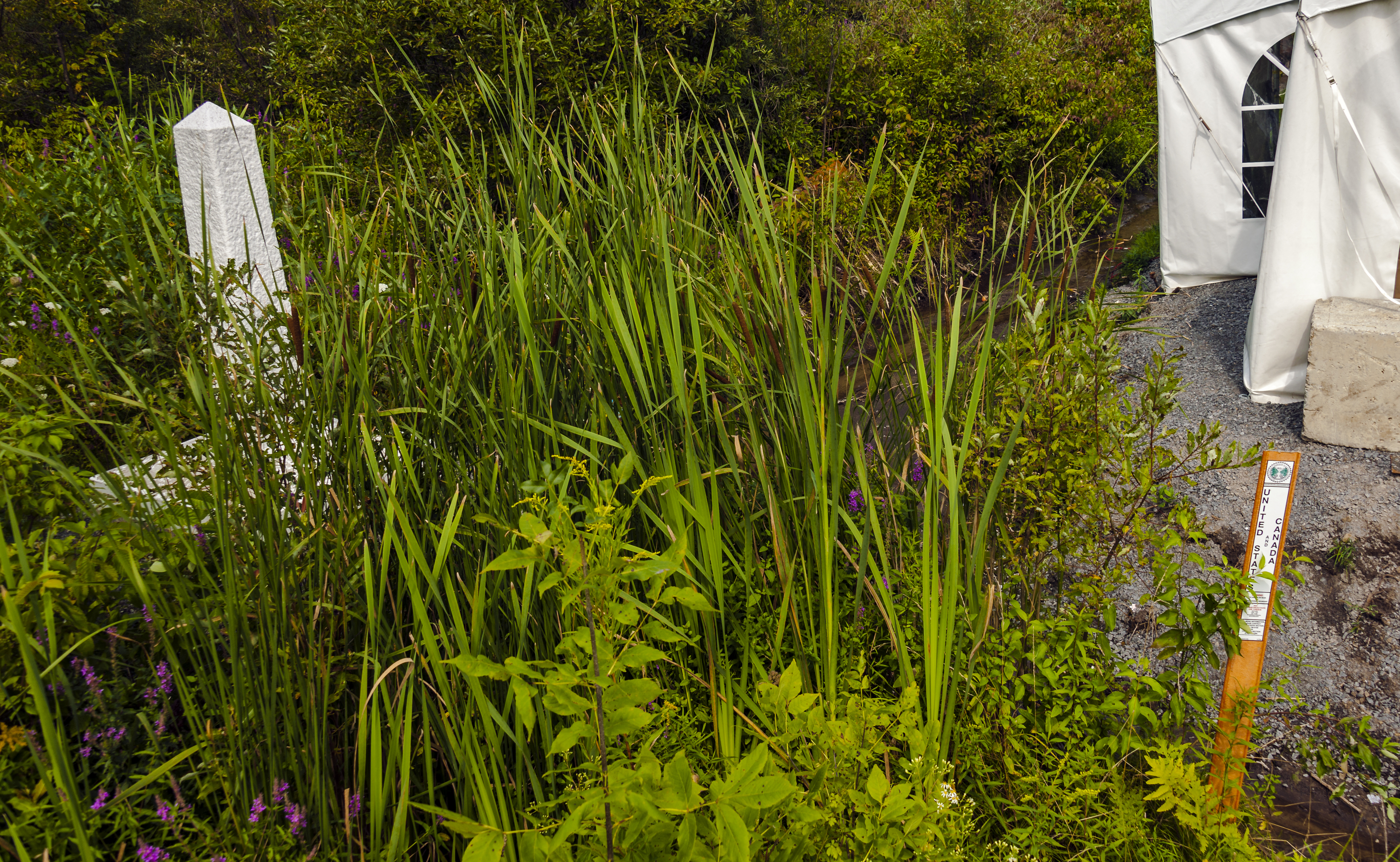
Border markers in vista between dead ends

A half-mile (800 m) from the turn to the northwest, the road reaches a cul-de-sac at the Canadian border, 0.6 mi (1 km) from its southern terminus. Large boulders and a gate obstruct vehicular passage, signage indicates in English and French that the road is closed and pedestrian traffic prohibited, and a tall pole with a light and monitoring station used by the U.S. Border Patrol. In the border vista there is a stone obelisk marking the border and a metal strip. Short gravel paths on either side of the barricades cross the border.

=== Quebec ===
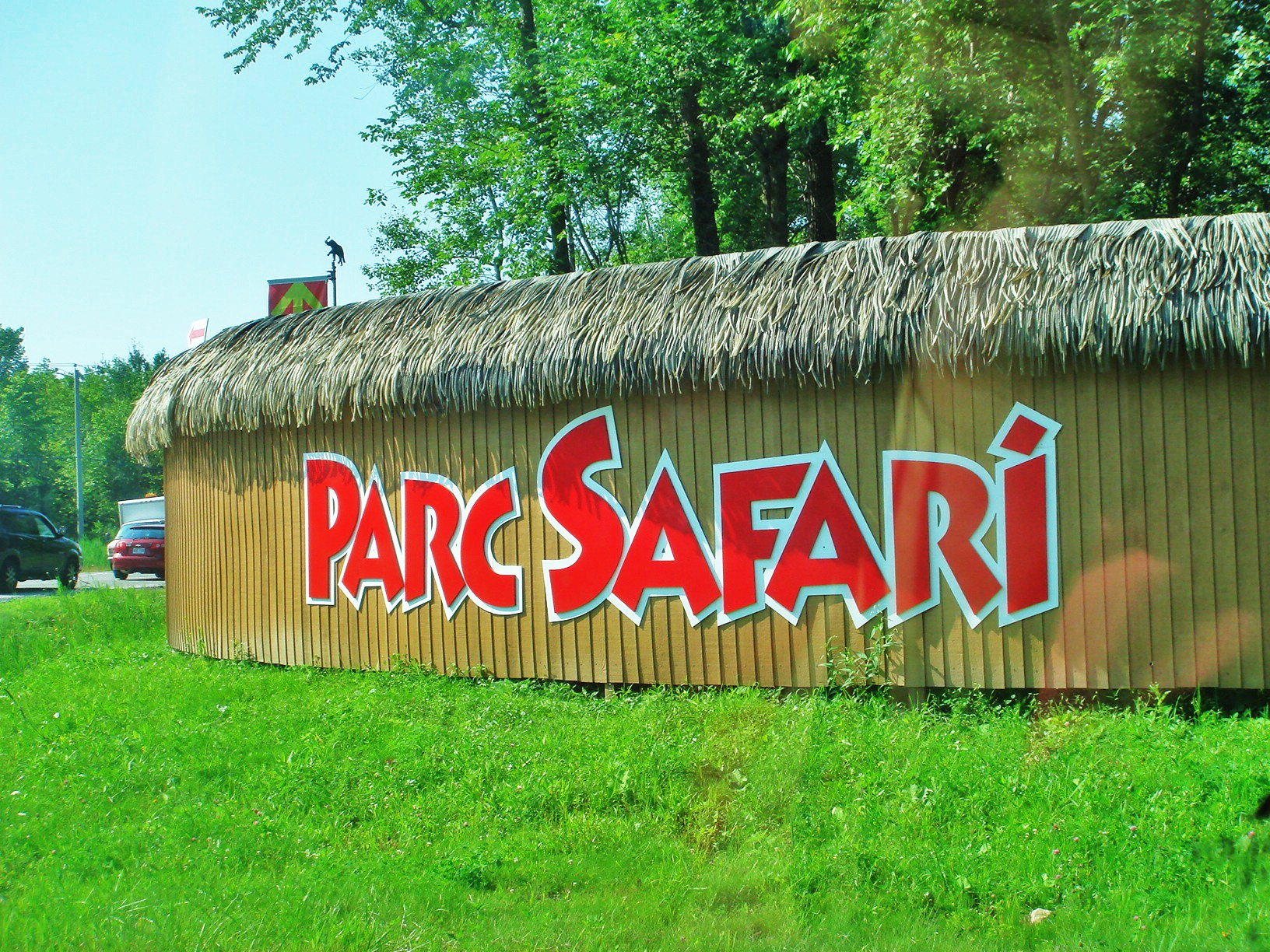
Parc Safari sign at Roxham Road and Route 202

Jersey barriers, augmented by similar no-crossing signage, across the road block vehicle passage on the Canadian side as Roxham, now signed Rang Roxham as required by Quebec law mandating the use of only French on most traffic signs, resumes its course. On the west is a wide cul-de-sac for vehicles to turn around and also provides access to a shared driveway for several houses. To deal with the influx of irregular migrants in the late 2010s, the Royal Canadian Mounted Police paved the cul-de-sac and erected two temporary structures on it to process them.

The former customs station, now a private home, is located on the east side of Roxham 60 m (200 ft) north of the border. The road continues north through more wooded areas and fields for 750 metres (2,460 ft) to its first intersection, with Chemin Fisher on the west. North of Chemin Fisher, the road is designated as Chemin Roxham. Another 750 metres (2,460 ft) to the north at a T-intersection, it reaches Montée Glass, which runs east towards Saint-Bernard-de-Lacolle and the southernmost exit on Quebec's Autoroute 15 (A-15), the continuation of Interstate 87 (I-87) connecting New York City and Montreal.

Roxham continues north for another 300 m (980 ft), and enters the farming community where it gets its name, then passes the Parc Safari entrance. Bordering the park, Roxham Road merges with Quebec Route 202 900 m (3,000 ft) north of the entrance. Roxham Road ends 2.7 km (1.7 mi) north of there, at a T-intersection with Route 202 (which continues eastwards) and Rang Bogton.

== History ==
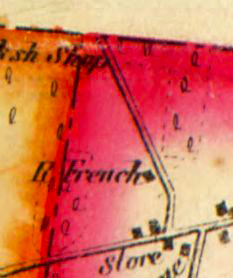
Roxham (unnamed) on 1856 map

There had been scattered European settlement of the area through which Roxham Road runs by both British and French colonists throughout the 17th and 18th centuries, but the hamlet of Roxham only began to develop at the beginning of the 19th century with the emigration of American Loyalists who would not renounce their allegiance to the British crown after the Revolution ended in independence for the Thirteen Colonies. Many of them found the land in today's Roxham very productive, producing 30 bushels of wheat per acre. They took their grain to the nearest mill, in Champlain, to be ground. A later Canadian history of that time records that the road from Roxham was first able to handle wheeled vehicles in 1810.

By 1838 the population along the road had grown enough that a small cemetery was established along it in the town of Champlain. The road, along its current course but unnamed, is shown on an 1856 map of Clinton County. By this time it was also, like other back roads crossing the border in the area, used by agents of the Underground Railroad to guide escaped enslaved Blacks to freedom—North Star Road, at the southern terminus of Roxham, is said to have gotten its name from the lore among escapees to look for Polaris in the night sky as a guide to which way was north.

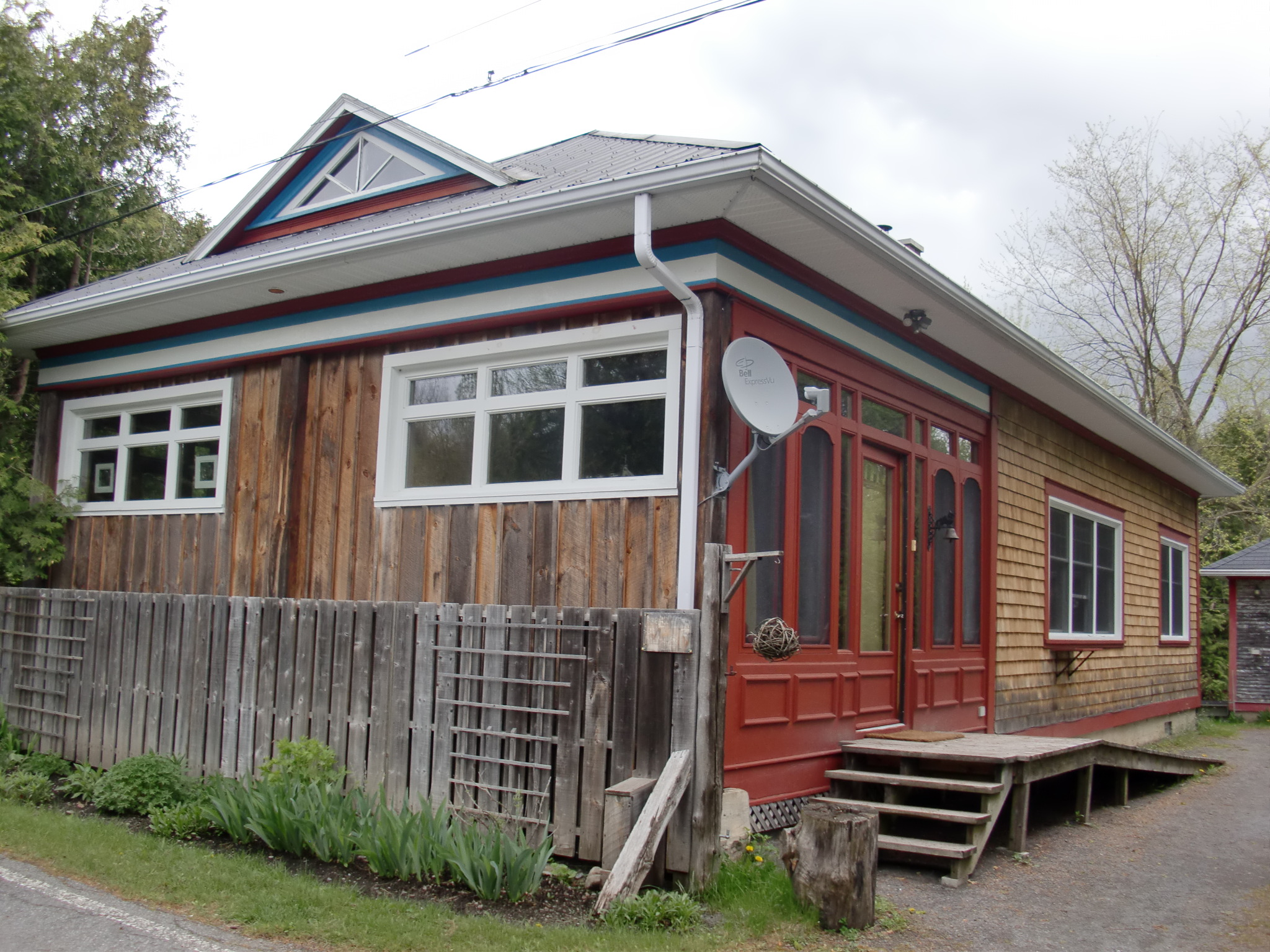
Former Canadian customs station

Canada established a customs station on Roxham just north of the border by the early 20th century. The U.S. did not reciprocate, even as the advent of Prohibition in the 1920s created a large market for illegal alcoholic beverages which bootleggers and rumrunners served, making use of the many unguarded roads across the border, such as Roxham, often at night. In the 1950s the Canadian government closed the customs station; it has since been repurposed as a private house. This left an 11 km (6.8 mi) gap along the border between ports of entry, between the busy Blackpool crossing of I-87 and A-15 to the east and the Mooers–Hemmingford Border Crossing on the west. (Note: A 1964 aerial photograph of the border crossing shows high fences along either side of Roxham south of the customs station remaining; the houses to the west of the border crossing have not been built yet and so the large cleared area that has since been paved did not exist at that time either. South of the border, conversely, the areas on either side of Roxham are much clearer than they are as of the early 21st century; the house on the east side just south of the border has not yet been built but its lot has been cleared. The large area of land beyond it is open with only a few trees, whereas it is densely wooded in 2021. On the other side, the current cul-de-sac has not been created in the 1964 image, but the land next to the road has reforested considerably since then, when the woods did not begin until at least 200 feet (61 m) from the road. A fence also runs along the Canadian border east from the crossing for about a thousand feet (300 m).)

Roxham Road was barricaded in both directions at the border in the 1970s. The U.S. Border Patrol had begun putting gates up at some unguarded crossings along the 174-mile (280 km) land border in New York and Vermont to inhibit smuggling early in the decade. Canada barricaded all uncontrolled crossings on its side as part of security operations supporting the 1976 Summer Olympics, fearful that terrorists like those who had killed Israeli athletes at the 1972 Munich Olympics could do something similar in Montreal, where the Games were held, and then quickly escape across the border.

During the 1980s, when illegal migration primarily took place from Canada into the U.S., the Border Patrol augmented this with electronic surveillance equipment. At some time since the early 1990s, the U.S. segment of the road was paved.

== Irregularly entering asylum seekers in the 2010s ==
=== Background ===
==== Safe Third Country Agreement ====
After the September 11, 2001, terrorist attacks, Canada and the U.S. worked together to improve border security. Among many agreements signed was the Safe Third Country Agreement, (CUSTCA, more commonly just STCA) stipulating that refugees coming to either country must apply for asylum in the first one they reach. It was generally seen at the time it was signed in 2002 as being sought primarily by Canada, to prevent refugees from "asylum-shopping". (Note: The flow of migrants using legal entry to one of the two countries in order to enter the other outside legal channels has sometimes gone the other way. During the first four decades in which the U.S. Chinese Exclusion Act, passed in 1882, was in force, Chinese immigrants, usually unaccompanied men, took advantage of permissive Canadian visa policies to enter the country with the intention of furtively crossing, or paying to be smuggled across, the border into the U.S. The illegal crossings were so numerous that U.S. immigration officials regularly complained of, and journalists reported on, the porosity of the border. This was ended by Canada's passage of similar legislation severely restricting Chinese travel to the country.) In 2004 it came into force and the amount of asylum applications to Canada began to drop; three years later a Canadian Federal Court ruled the treaty unconstitutional, on the basis that U.S. law did not offer the same protections as Canada for applicants, but that decision was in turn overturned by an appeals court on procedural grounds.

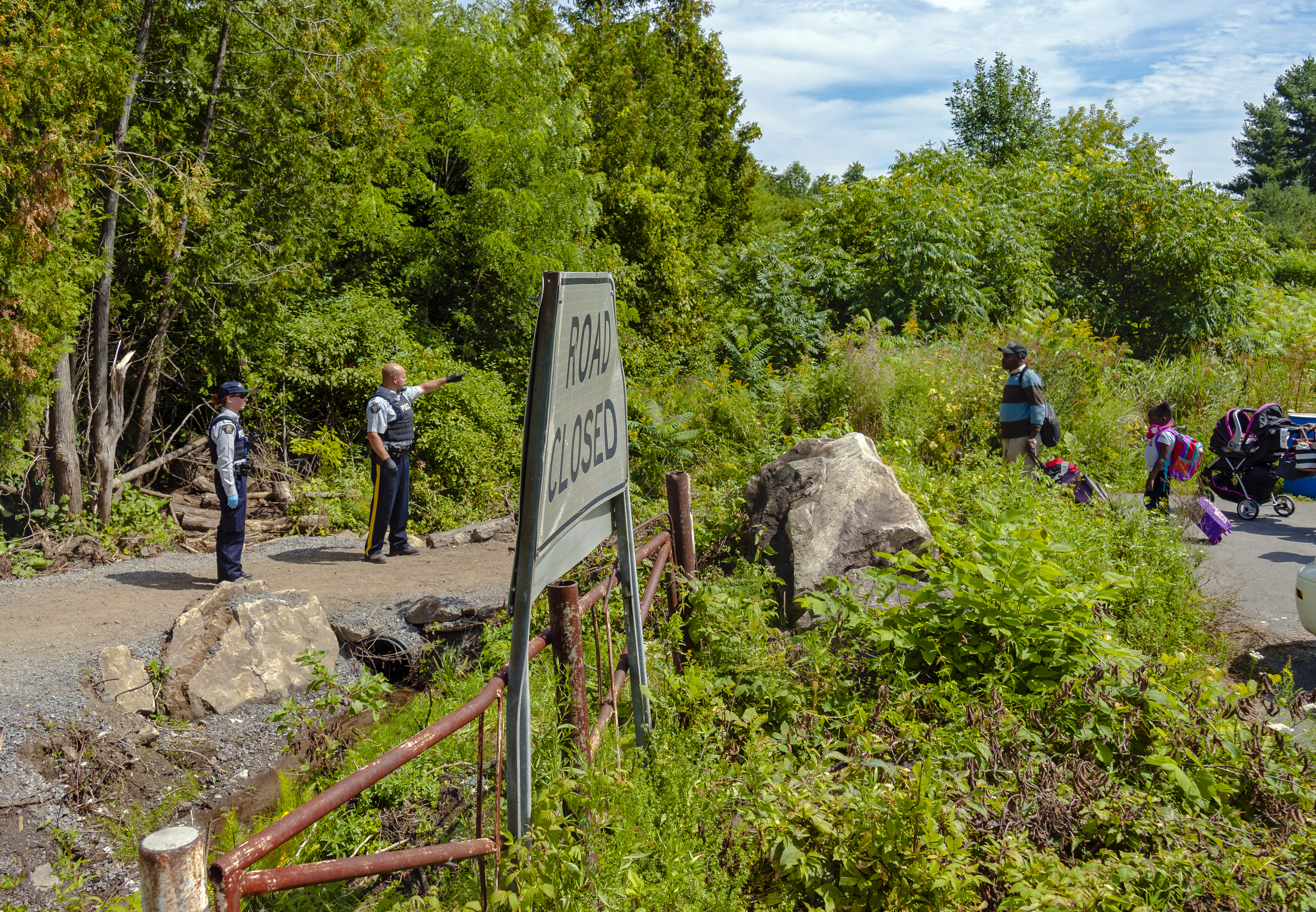
Royal Canadian Mounted Police (RCMP) on Canadian side of border at Roxham advise a family about to cross that they will be taken into custody if they enter here

Under the STCA, any prospective refugee who does not have an application for asylum already pending in Canada will be refused admission to the country if they enter from the U.S. Those refugees would then have to return to the U.S., where their attempt to exit would nullify any application process they had begun for asylum in the U.S. and lead to their detention pending deportation as illegal aliens. But this provision of the agreement applies only to those who present themselves at official ports of entry. Should they cross the border anywhere else, they would be entering unlawfully as long as they did not go to the nearest border crossing and present themselves to Canada Border Services Agency (CBSA) personnel for inspection and processing. (Note: This provision has been described as having been meant to ensure that Canadians who cross-border shop pay appropriate duty on whatever they may have purchased in the U.S.) Those taken into custody before reaching a border station are detained, cannot be returned to the U.S. until their case is handled, and may file an asylum application.

==== Canadian asylum law ====
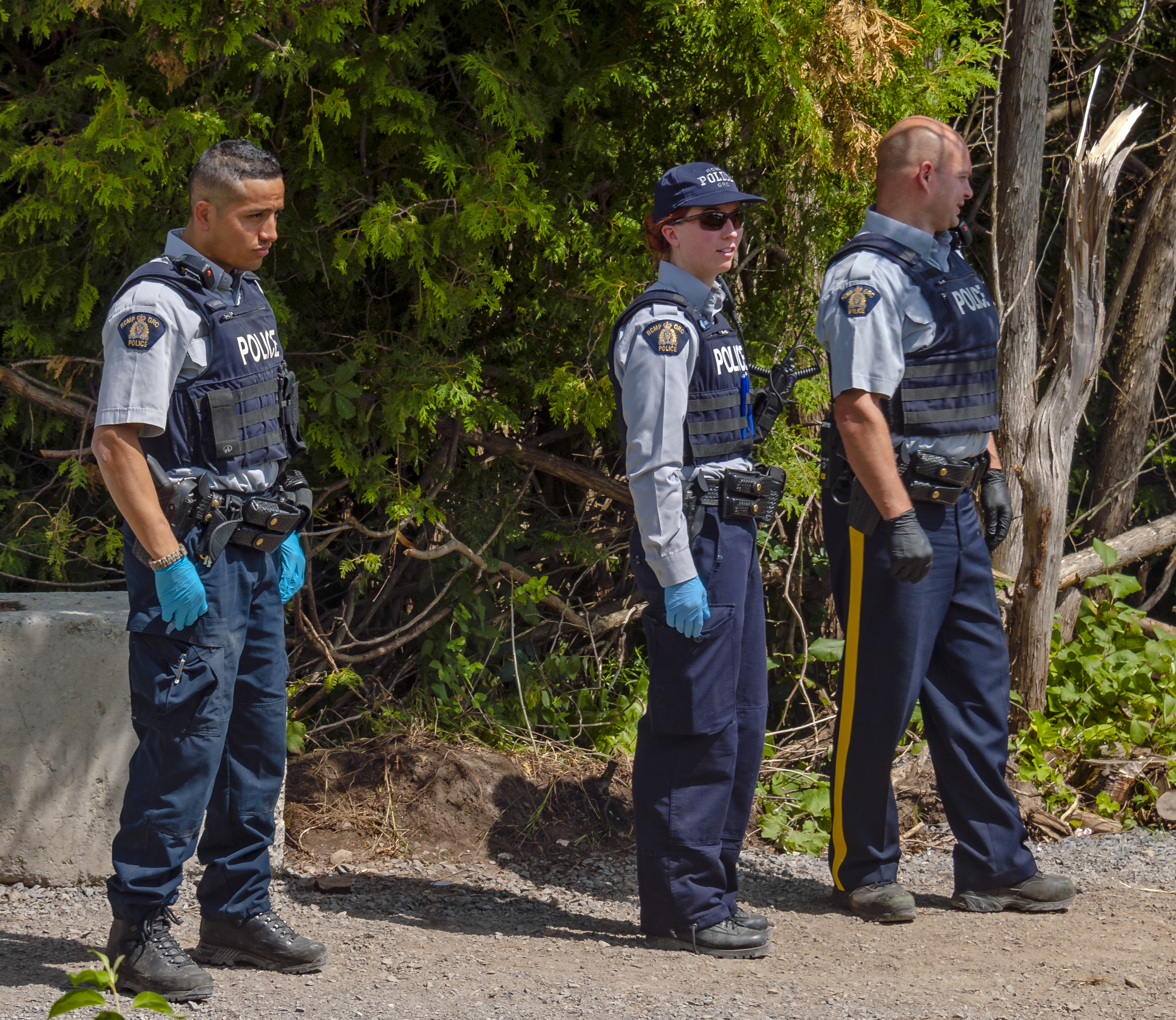
RCMP officers on the border at Roxham awaiting refugees about to cross

Differences in the way the U.S. and Canada treat those who cross their borders unofficially make the latter country attractive to refugees. University of Toronto law professor Audrey Macklin, who specializes in Canadian immigration law, notes that American federal law makes any crossing by an alien at anywhere other than an official crossing point, or under the direction of immigration officials, a criminal offense with fines and imprisonment as possible punishments. In Canada, while such a border crossing can carry similar penalties, it is for those seeking asylum only an administrative violation of the federal Immigration and Refugee Protection Regulations, and then only if the defendant has not reported to a customs station "without delay" or did not intend to. "Since almost all irregular border crossers enter in the presence of the RCMP," writes Macklin, "and the RCMP immediately detain and transfer them to a CBSA officer at a nearby port of entry for examination, these border crossers have not violated ... the Immigration and Refugee Protection Regulations".

Since most refugees are taken to customs after being taken into custody soon after their border crossing, they may not have even broken the law, and thus crossings such as those at Roxham Road are referred to as "irregular" entries. Any prosecutions of those who enter Canada that way and then apply for asylum are deferred until the process is finished, including appeals. A sign at the border on Roxham since 2018 advises entrants that it is not a legal point of entry into Canada and those who insist on crossing there will be arrested.

Also, Canada, like the U.S., is signatory to the 1951 Convention Relating to the Status of Refugees. Unlike the U.S., it has incorporated the Convention's provisions into its Immigration and Refugee Protection Act. One of those provisions provides that the mode of a refugee's entry into Canada cannot be held against them if they are found to have had well-founded fears of persecution in their homeland.

Asylum claimants already on Canadian soil also benefit from case law holding that the Canadian Constitution's Charter of Rights and Freedoms requires that their claims of danger to life and safety should they be returned to their homeland after denial of their applications be fully adjudicated before any decisions can be made about that course of action. This gives claimants the right of appeal not only administratively, to the Refugee Appeal Division, but beyond that to the courts. Refugees applying from outside Canada do not have recourse to that extensive appeals process.

While waiting for their claims to be resolved, refugees in Quebec receive significant benefits. They can work in addition to collecting a stipend of $C600 a month, receive free health care, free French lessons, and have their children educated in public school, albeit in French as Quebec mandates for immigrants. Since it often takes several years to fully resolve a claim, the system creates what Keller describes as a perverse incentive for an applicant to somehow get to Canada and then make their claim: "[A] refugee claim made on Canadian soil is a backdoor way for an economic migrant to spend a few years, possibly many years, legally working in Canada."

The Canadian populace and government thus often has a negative response to any reports of significant attempts by immigrants to enter Canada outside official channels. In 2010, a Thai freighter, the MV Sun Sea, was intercepted in Canadian waters off the coast of British Columbia with nearly 500 Sri Lankan Tamil refugees from their country's civil war, less than a year after another, smaller ship, the Ocean Lady had brought several dozen. The total between the two ships amounted to fewer immigrants than Canada admits legally every day, but the federal government, under Conservative Prime Minister Stephen Harper, detained all the asylum seekers and began building criminal cases against most of them to deter future immigrants from attempting irregular entry, even as it also began processing their asylum applications. By 2017 only one person involved had been convicted, against seven acquittals, and holdings in other cases made further prosecutions unlikely.

=== 2015–2017: Irregular border crossings at Roxham ===
While the use of Roxham and other irregular border crossings into Canada by refugees seeking asylum there would later be blamed on the Trump administration's immigration policies, it began, according to Queen's University researcher Christian Leuprecht, during Barack Obama's first term as U.S. president, when deportations increased. During 2015, residents of Roxham Road, on both sides of the border, first noticed refugees using their street to enter Canada and request asylum. About 350 came the following year, driven by fears that Donald Trump would be elected U.S. president and implement the stricter immigration policies he was advocating. The earliest often continued down Roxham, asking any residents they saw if they were indeed in Canada, and while the first likely entered Canada undetected, later migrants were met by RCMP officers which took them into custody for the possibly illegal border crossing. (Note: Canada, unlike the U.S., does not have a dedicated law enforcement agency devoted to border protection; the RCMP have assumed that responsibility)

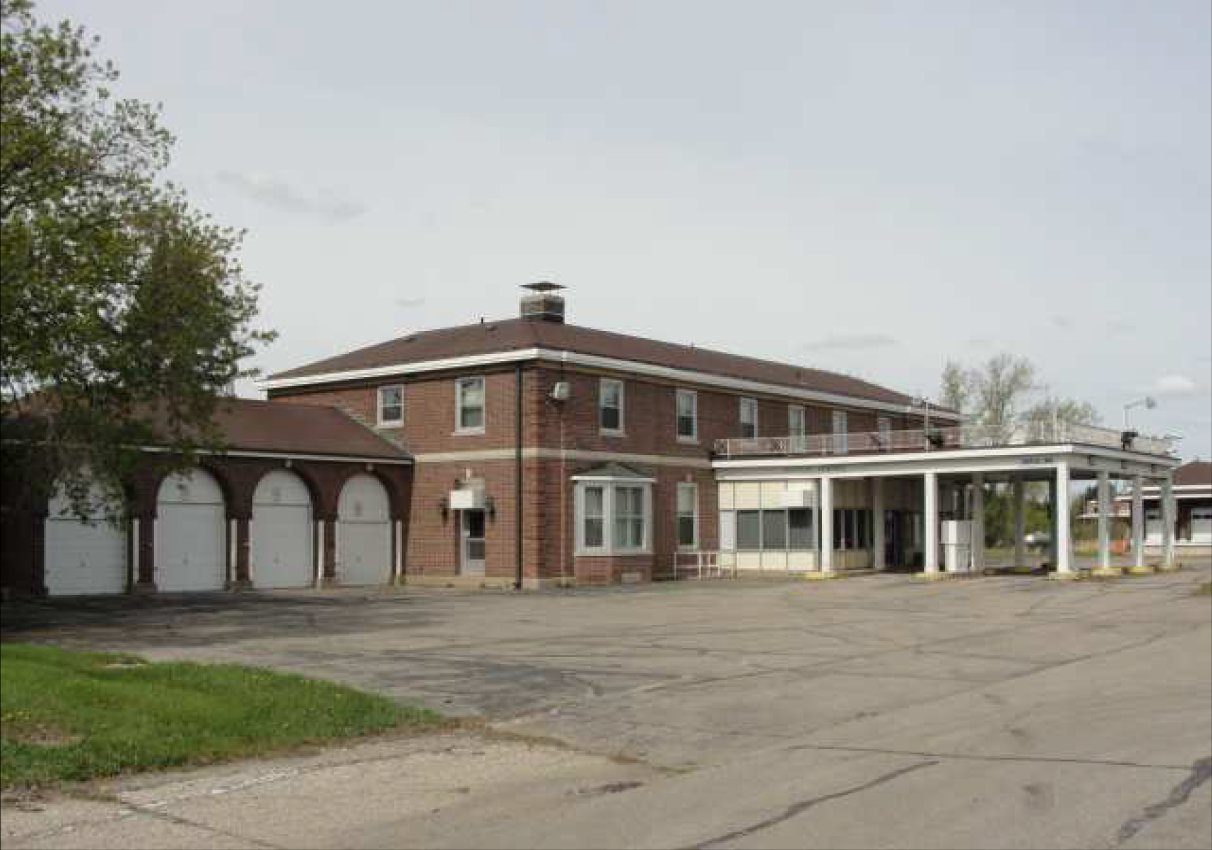
The closed border station in Noyes, Minnesota, another location where many refugees have irregularly entered Canada

By the end of the year the RCMP presence at the border cul-de-sac was continuous. Elsewhere along the border, refugees increased, particularly in Emerson, Manitoba, where they used a former port of entry, now closed, to enter Canada from Noyes, Minnesota. Others crossed open fields, sometimes suffering permanent injury or death from hypothermia in the severe Great Plains winter weather. Two Ghanaian refugees' frostbitten fingers had to be amputated after they spent a night at temperatures around −20 °C (−4 °F) buried to their waists in a snowbank; (Note: One of them said later that had he known about Roxham, he would have gone there instead.) another woman from their country was found dead in the snow a half-mile (800 m) south of the border.

Many of those who crossed at Roxham in 2016 came to Canada fleeing armed conflict elsewhere in the world, the RCMP officers who apprehended them said. Others, including Chadians and Eritreans, had been expelled from Saudi Arabia after finding themselves unemployed there and did not want to return to their homelands, where they might have to render military service. (Note: Members of a family who had fled Colombia several years earlier due to threats on the wife's life after she discovered illegal activity at the bank she worked at told The Buffalo News their story of crossing the border at Roxham during this period. They settled in Columbus, Ohio, where they had a second child, but after their visas expired they were uncertain as to whether they could stay. They learned of the Roxham crossing and decided to attempt it, driving to the Plattsburgh area where they were stopped by the Border Patrol near a Walmart (residents there often report cars with out-of-state plates and Latinx occupants as possible illegal aliens). They were interviewed at length, and then released with just a summons, after which they drove their car to what they recall as a road that dead-ended at the border. After taking their luggage, they left the car behind and crossed the border in the rain, continuing north. After walking for a half-hour, a police officer saw them, asked if they were hungry, and took them into custody, where they began their asylum application process, which three years later, when they had been settled into a Fort Erie refugee home, was still not complete.) Sudan, Syria and Yemen, all riven by domestic conflict, also accounted for many seeking asylum. In the first nine months of 2016 Canada granted asylum to 62 percent of those crossing the border irregularly.

Trump won that year's U.S. presidential election and was inaugurated on January 20, 2017. A week later he had issued Executive Order 13769 making good on his campaign promises to restrict immigration, banning all travel from seven Muslim-majority countries for the next 90 days, suspending new refugee admissions for 120 days and admissions for those from Syria indefinitely. The following day, Canadian Prime Minister Justin Trudeau, who had personally greeted the first of 25,000 Syrian refugees at Toronto Pearson International Airport within a month of assuming the post, tweeted: "To those fleeing persecution, terror & war, Canadians will welcome you, regardless of your faith. Diversity is our strength #WelcomeToCanada".

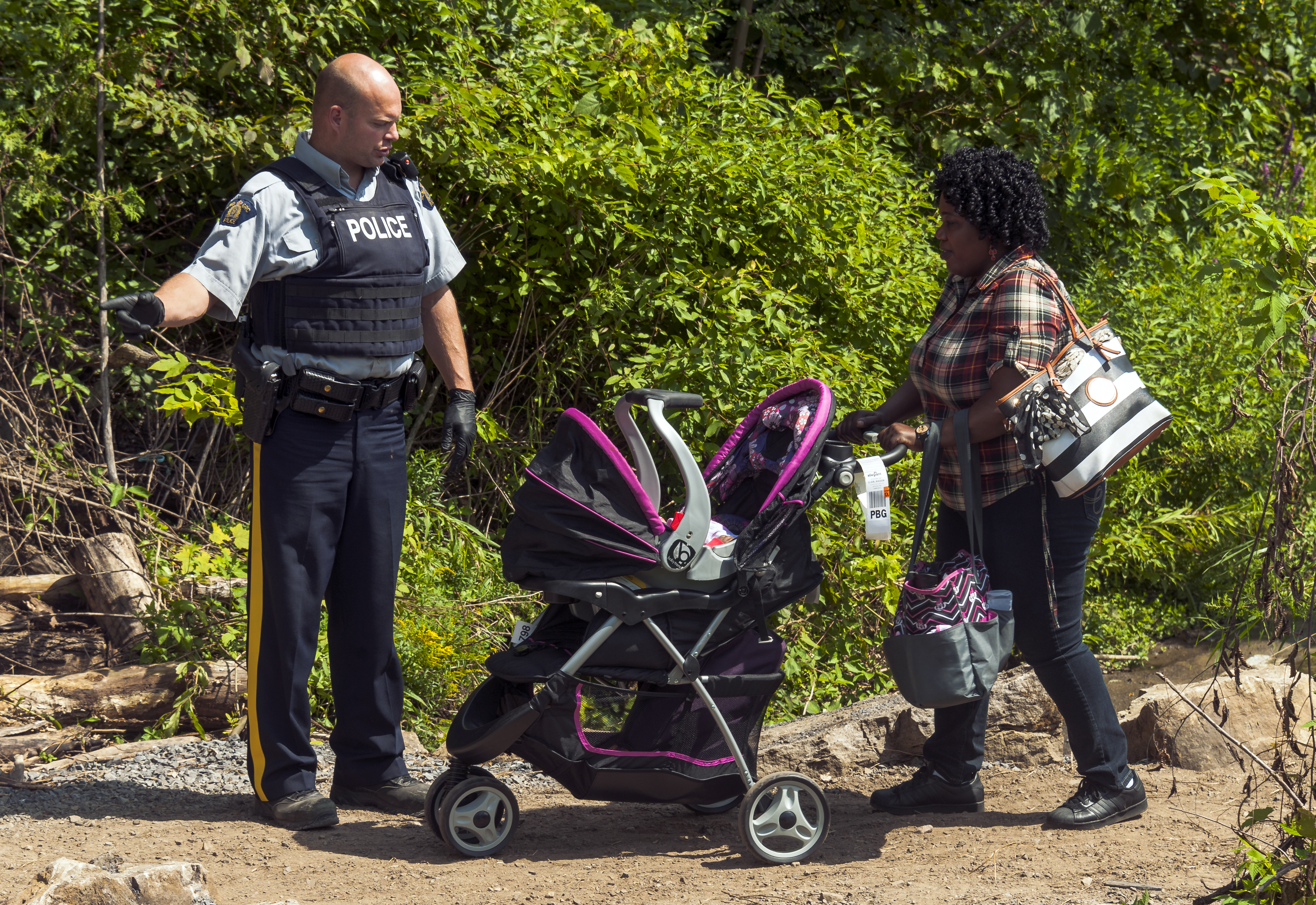
A Mountie at the border points the way forward for a woman crossing with her child in 2017.

Shortly afterward the media reported that crossings at Roxham Road had increased. One February morning the Montreal Gazette counted 19 before 10 a.m.; on the U.S. side residents said that taxis came up the road at all hours. As at Emerson, the harsh winter weather was a challenge for refugees from tropical climates, who did not always obtain sufficient clothing. A Sri Lankan man had lost some extremities to frostbite, an RCMP officer recalled. The CBC comedy sketch show This Hour Has 22 Minutes parodied the coverage, with its actors playing RCMP constables apprehending both Hillary Clinton, former U.S. First Lady and loser of the previous year's presidential election, and current First Lady Melania Trump, who had supposedly attempted the crossing for the third time in a week.

Canadian immigration activists, along with some normally apolitical residents on the U.S. side of Roxham, blamed Trump, his actions and his rhetoric for the increase in crossings, although one of those at the crossing involved in transporting or processing the refugees said that some refugees had traveled to Roxham Road directly from New York City's John F. Kennedy International Airport (JFK). The activists in particular said the crossings demonstrated issues they had had with the STCA since its ratification: that by allowing refugee claims at irregular entry points like Roxham Road, it put refugees at risk for their safety and encouraged the rise of a smuggling industry. (Note: This was demonstrated in the Champlain-Lacolle area in April 2019 when Dominican Wilson Reynoso Vega was found dead in the woods near Lake Champlain a short distance north of the border. He had wanted to see his daughter in the U.S., and after being denied a visa obtained a Canadian visa and went to Toronto, where he had said he might try applying for a U.S. visa again in the hopes that having been admitted to Canada would count in his favor. Instead, he paid $3,500 to two men who dropped him off 2 km (1.2 miles) north of the border with a group of Mexicans in the middle of a night where temperatures dropped to nearly freezing and told the group to walk straight south; someone would be there for them once they reached the U.S. The Mexicans, after reaching Rouses Point cold and wet following their trip through the many wetlands in the wooded area, were taken into custody by the Border Patrol. They said that on the way south Reynoso said something was wrong with his legs and turned back. Investigators believe he grew disoriented in the woods and eventually collapsed from hypothermia and drowned in a marsh.)

One group of migrants was moved to seek asylum in Canada because of Trump's actions: Haitians. After the 2010 earthquake there, the Obama administration granted Haitian nationals living in the U.S. temporary protected status (TPS), under which they did not have to worry about visa expirations and could bring family members to the U.S. from Haiti. (Note: Canada had also granted Haitians "temporary suspension of removals", its equivalent of TPS, after the earthquake, but ended it in late 2014, giving those Haitians still in Canada a six-month grace period after which they could remain only if they had received, or applied for, permanent residency; if not, they faced deportation.) The Obama administration reviewed, and renewed, Haitian TPS every 18 months for the remainder of his presidential term. But even before Trump announced in 2017 that his administration might not be renewing Haitian TPS the following year, Haitians who had been hoping for green cards and permanent-resident status, decided they could not wait, and went to Roxham Road to cross into Canada and apply for asylum. (Note: Many Haitians brought with them children born to them in the U.S., which complicates their situations as those children are automatically U.S. citizens, and thus could not claim refugee status in Canada as they would not be in danger of deportation to Haiti if they were returned to the U.S. In many cases, however, those children have no relatives in the U.S. to return to, and it is uncertain whether Haiti would accept them since the children of Haitian citizens born abroad may not necessarily gain their parents' citizenship.) It has been estimated that 7.5 percent of the Haitians living in the U.S. with TPS chose to seek refugee status in Canada by entering irregularly. In May 2018 it was reported that only 9.5 percent of the Haitians who had crossed into Canada irregularly had had their asylum claims accepted.

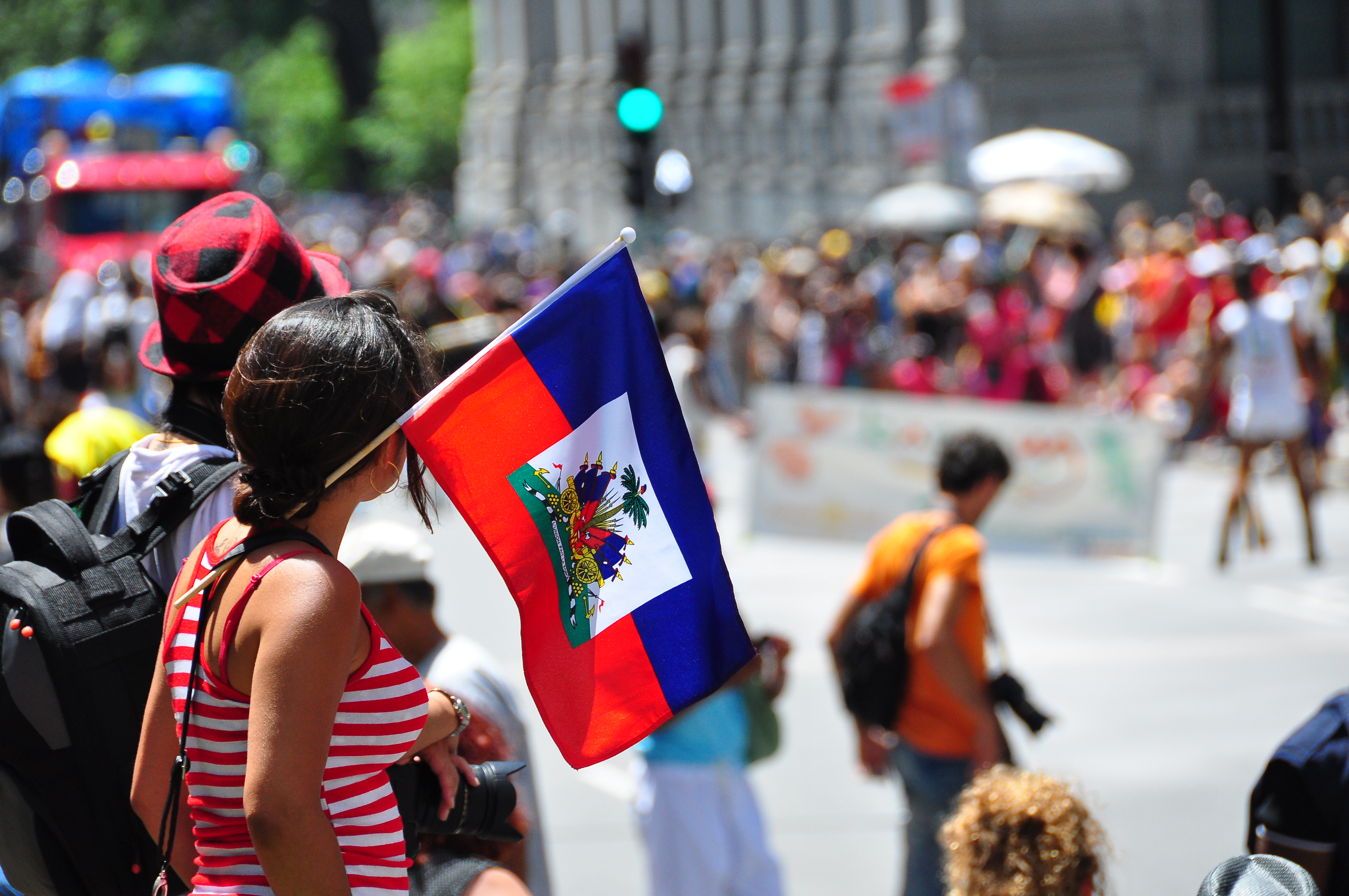
Haitian Canadians celebrating their heritage in Montreal

The Haitians were attracted to Quebec, and Montreal specifically, as a destination for resettlement since Haitians, most fleeing the "Papa Doc" Duvalier dictatorship, had emigrated there since the early 1960s, and spoke well of the city to others. They could assimilate more easily into a Francophone society, and while Quebec's culture does feature a strong cultural prejudice in favor of pure laine ("pure wool") white French Canadians, most concern about immigrants in the province has been directed at those from a Muslim background.

By August 2017, when as many as 400 refugees a day were crossing through Roxham, Canadian immigration authorities, and the RCMP, had erected temporary tents (replaced by a steel-sided building in 2018) at the crossing to shelter workers and process refugees. On the U.S. side traffic cones were placed at the east side of the cul-de-sac to create a queue and dropoff area. A level path had been built across the vista so those crossing it did not have to walk through water that sometimes had accumulated there, and a small culvert built underneath it.

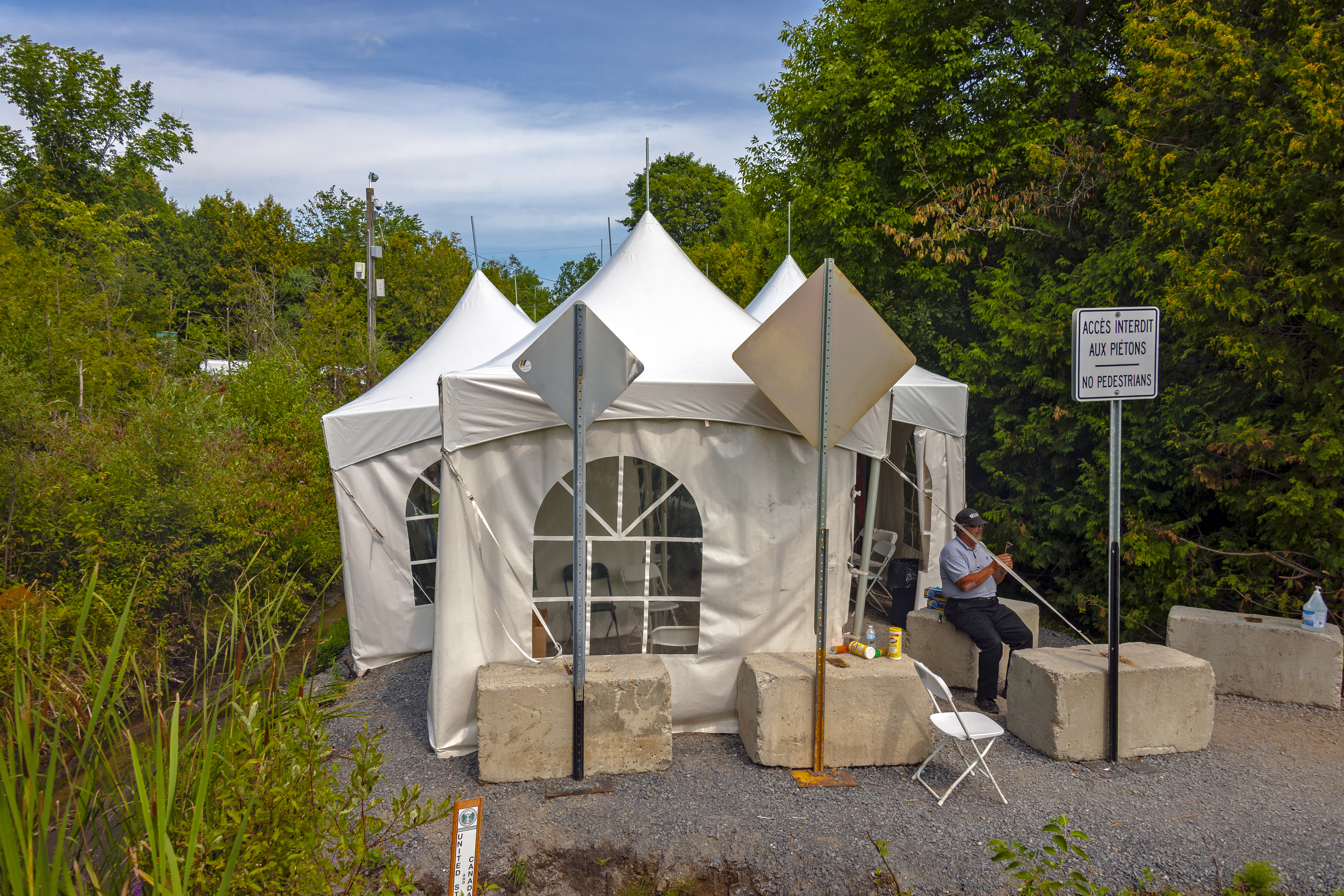
Tents on Canadian side of border in August 2017

In October, the Toronto Star reported that irregular entrants at Roxham had been required to fill out a three-page questionnaire that asked, in addition to relevant questions about criminal history, possible terror group connections, and how and why they got there, questions about their religious beliefs and practice, such as whether they or their wives wore Islamic female garments like a hijab, chador or niqab, and how they might feel about working for a woman, questions that some applicants found unnecessary and intrusive. Canadian Muslim activists alleged that it was part of a pattern of Islamophobic behavior by law enforcement. The RCMP explained that it had been developed from an interview guide developed for the officers at Roxham and would be immediately discontinued as "inappropriate and inconsistent with government policy." Later the RCMP agreed to redact the answers to those questions from digital copies of those questionnaires.

After refugees' initial entry, they were taken to a nearby encampment to live while they awaited the results of initial security checks. Following that, they were housed in Montreal, either at Olympic Stadium or a former hospital, while their claims were pending before the Immigration and Refugee Board of Canada (IRB). In 2017, 15,915, or 77 percent of the total 20,593 asylum applicants (Note: The IRB did not start reliably collecting these statistics until February 2017, with only partial data available for that month and March. A CBC story from late 2018 gives both a higher number of total irregular entrants and states that a greater percentage came via Roxham Road; it does not give a source for these numbers.) (Note: According to the U.S. Border Patrol, a location on the east shore of the Richelieu River, where east-west Line Road in Alburg, Vermont, turns north to follow the shoreline and becomes Chemin Bord de L'Eau Sud in Noyan, Quebec, without a port of entry on either side, had also become popular with refugees entering that province, since the only barrier at the border there is a downed log that can easily be stepped over, and it is as convenient to nearby Burlington as Roxham Road is to Plattsburgh.) who made their requests after an irregular border crossing came through Roxham Road. The third quarter of 2017—July through September—saw the largest number of claims for any quarter the IRB has been tracking claims from those who cross irregularly, with 8,559. The largest nationality represented at Roxham was Haitians, with 5,785 crossers, 36.3 percent of the total at that location. Of the 17,632 claims the IRB reports receiving that year from irregular entrants, it only accepted 1,140, or 6.4 percent. (Note: Not all claims were fully processed; in addition to those rejected (never greater than those accepted) there were claims either withdrawn or abandoned, or otherwise disposed.)

=== 2018: Political repercussions in Canada ===
In 2018 Nigerians began to make up a larger share of refugees crossing the border at the end of Roxham. Some had been living in the U.S. for a year or more and grown frustrated at a lack of job opportunities, but many had come to the U.S. on tourist visas, flown into New York City, and then gone directly to Roxham Road, sometimes by flying, taking the bus or train to Plattsburgh, New York, the nearest city, and sometimes paying taxi or ridesharing drivers to take them all the way there, a distance of 350 miles (560 km) one way and almost six hours' uninterrupted driving time from Kennedy Airport. Canadian authorities eventually began pressuring their U.S. counterparts to more diligently screen Nigerian visa applicants; the U.S. began revoking visas of those Nigerians it found had come there for the sole purpose of attempting to enter Canada irregularly, (Note: Some putative refugees went the other direction, coming to Canada legally in order to attempt illegal entry into the U.S. and seek asylum. After Canada eased visa requirements for Romanian citizens, in two separate early 2018 incidents the U.S. Border Patrol arrested carloads of Romanians (with some Frenchpeople) who had driven onto the sidewalk at the Haskell Free Library and Opera House, which straddles the border between Derby Line, Vermont, and Stanstead, Quebec, in order to circumvent concrete planters in the street at the border to prevent uncontrolled vehicular access to the U.S. at that point. They made it as far south from Derby Line as the nearby city of Newport, where they were pulled over on Interstate 91. The planters in the street have since been augmented by a line of boulders along the border in both directions to the nearest building.) and by 2019 the U.S. was granting 10 percent fewer tourist visas to Nigerians. Border Patrol officers, whose jurisdiction extends to 100 miles (160 km) south of the border, do check the paperwork of any refugees they encounter in the vicinity, but can only apprehend those who cannot show proof their presence in the U.S. is legal. At the border, when present, they routinely warn refugees that whatever paperwork they have that allows them into the U.S. will be void once they cross, whatever happens on the Canadian side.

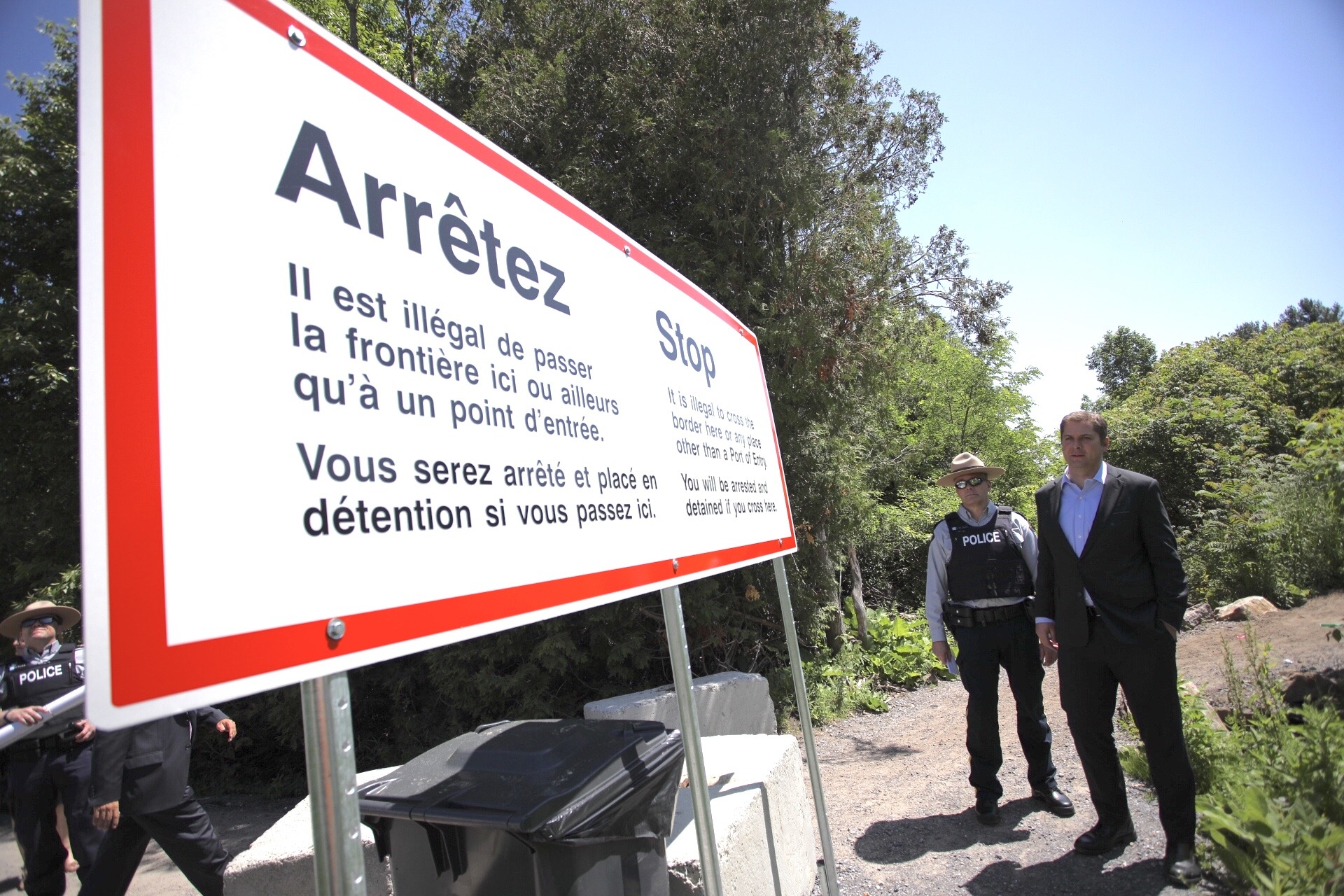
Andrew Scheer, leader of the opposition Conservative Party, touring the Roxham Road crossing in 2018

The flow of refugees across the border at Roxham Road became a political problem for Trudeau as his critics and opponents suggested his government was being too permissive and had lost control of the situation. Michelle Rempel Garner, official Immigration, Refugees and Citizenship critic for the Conservative opposition, suggested Trudeau had created a "crisis" with his January tweet he had been either unable or unwilling to substantially address. On the prime minister's left, the New Democratic Party called for the government to withdraw from the STCA. Its immigration critic, Jenny Kwan, wrote to then-immigration minister Ahmed Hussen, arguing that not only had U.S. refugee policy never been equivalent to Canada's in the protection it offered, the recent violence at a white nationalist rally in Charlottesville, Virginia, suggested the U.S. was even less safe for non-white refugees.

Politicians in Quebec also raised complaints. François Legault, then leader of the Coalition Avenir Québec (CAQ), said in August 2017 that the federal government was being "completely irresponsible" and allowing the border to become a "sieve". Quebec premier Philippe Couillard criticized Legault's calls for tighter border controls as intemperate, saying they demonstrated "a sheer lack of leadership."

Quebec's Official Opposition, the Parti Québécois, had also raised questions about the province's capacity to absorb the refugee influx, but had not gone as far as Legault had in calling for a more restrictive border policy. But in April 2018, as it was reported that the amount of refugees crossing at Roxham had increased by 2,000 over the same period the preceding year, its leader, Jean-François Lisée, told reporters before a party caucus session that a fence should be built at the site. "We have the best known irregular road in the world," he complained. "We have several good fence builders in Quebec, so we're spoiled for choice." He suggested it could be paid for by "the Mexicans", a joking reference to the similar barrier being built by the Trump administration on the U.S.-Mexico border.

All the province's other party heads condemned the suggestion, as well as the United Nations High Commissioner for Refugees, which called it "legally and morally wrong". Lisée later qualified his remarks by suggesting a line of trees or a police presence would be sufficient; after being reminded he had used the word "fence" he said one like those found around schools would be sufficient. His proposal was echoed by Toronto Sun columnist Anthony Furey a month later, who went further, suggesting an actual wall at the site for a few years.

On Canada Day 2017, members of the Quebec far-right groups La Meute and Storm Alliance, who had been discreetly observing the crossings for some time beforehand, staged a small protest at the Canadian side of Roxham Road, arguing that members of terrorist groups and criminals were being allowed into Canada there. A smaller group of pro-migrant protestors counterdemonstrated, with the RCMP and Sûreté du Québec keeping the two groups apart. By May 2018, two more such protests had been held, with the location shifting to the encampment nearer Lacolle and both sides attracting more supporters; Canadian activist Jaggi Singh was arrested and charged with assault on an officer at those protests after he led a group of demonstrators onto the A-15 near the Montée Guay interchange with the intent of blocking traffic, an action which delayed the arrival of the far-right protesters.

After an August 2017 protest over Roxham Road in Quebec City, Trudeau, while reiterating that Canada welcomes refugees, reminded those seeking to come that Canada is "also a country of laws" and exhorted asylum seekers to go through the formal legal process by applying overseas before coming to Canada. Haitian Canadian MP Emmanuel Dubourg, who himself had come to Canada as a young man, went to Miami, home to 200,000 Haitian expatriates, to make the same plea. He reminded Haitians there that only half of those seeking asylum in Canada ultimately received it, and that the Canadian government was not only willing to deport unsuccessful claimants, it had already done so. "It's important to tell them that before they sell their things, before they take any kind of decision [to come]", he said. "They have to know full well what can happen."

Following the example of Dubourg's trip to Miami the year before, in May 2018 Hussen, who had himself come to Canada in his youth as a Somali refugee, went to Nigeria to speak with American diplomats and government officials there and get the message to Nigerians that Roxham Road was not the path to asylum in Canada. At a news conference prior to his departure, accompanied by Transport Minister Marc Garneau and Public Safety Minister Ralph Goodale, Hussen stressed that "[w]e value our relationship with Nigeria but this is a real issue and they need to help us address the issue of Nigerian nationals abusing the visa system to come to Canada and claiming asylum." He warned that only 10 percent of the Nigerians who had crossed at Roxham had been granted asylum (at the same time it was also reported that the acceptance rate for Nigerians was 33.5 percent).

After returning he said the talks had gone well, that American consular officials had become more rigorous in their screening and that Nigerian officials had been willing to get the message out that those wishing to emigrate to Canada should whenever possible go through official channels. "There is misinformation being directed toward some Nigerian nationals, and they are being told that going to Canada and crossing the border is a free ticket", he said. The Nigerians had also promised to issue new travel documents so that unsuccessful claimants could be deported there; at that time only 1 percent of the 28,000 irregular crossers had been removed from Canada.

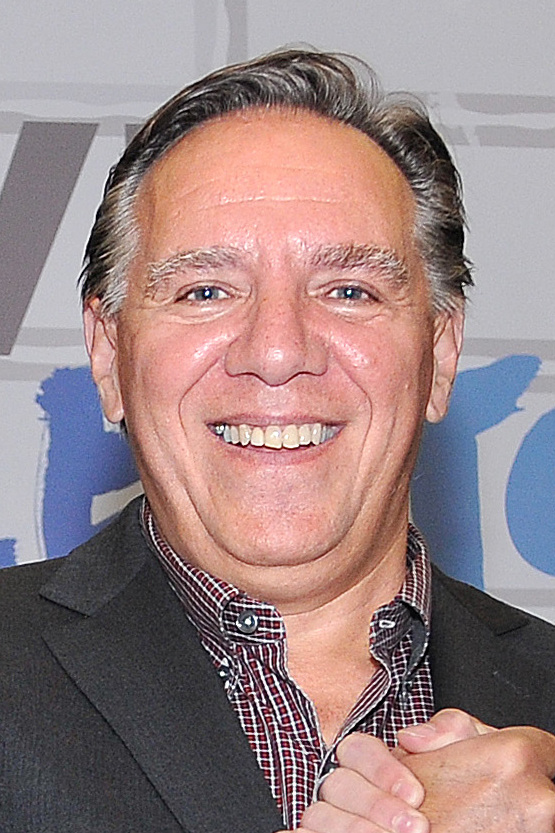
Legault's CAQ won Quebec's elections after promising to reduce immigration

In October 2018 Quebec held provincial elections. The CAQ, previously the third-strongest party in the provincial legislature, won a majority of its 125 seats, consigning Couillard's ruling Quebec Liberal Party (QLP) to the opposition, and in turn the former opposition Parti Quebecois to a mere 10 seats, its worst performance since 1970 when it had first gained seats. It was the first election in Quebec since then to return a party other than the QLP or PQ to power, and like that Union Nationale government it was right-of-center. Legault and the CAQ had run in part on his promise to reduce immigration to the province.

For 2018, the IRB reported 20,607 total asylum applications from irregular entrants. Of those, 18,215, or 88 percent, came through Roxham Road. The largest portion that year were the 7,585, or 42 percent, from Nigeria. Haitians dropped to 585, roughly a tenth of their 2017 total; the planned revocation of TPS late in 2017 was stayed pending litigation and almost a year later a U.S. federal judge enjoined the Trump administration from doing so. Over a thousand Colombians entered at Roxham, as well. The IRB accepted 3,307 of the applicants who crossed irregularly, improving its rate to 16 percent of the total.

=== 2019: Canadian election year ===
Late in 2018 the Canadian government began compensating the residents along Roxham near the border for all the disruption to their neighborhood. One woman who owns a 200-acre (81 ha) farm about a kilometer from the crossing received $25,000. She and 44 other residents in the area eventually split $405,000, the individual payments based on how close they lived to the border.

The Roxham Road residents were not the only parties compensated. In mid-2018 the federal government had offered Manitoba, Ontario (where many of the non-Francophone refugee claimants preferred to resettle) and Quebec $50 million each to offset the cost of supporting asylum seekers; at the beginning of 2019 it made $115 million available to provincial and local governments to cover refugees' temporary housing costs. Ontario and Quebec said that by that point they had spent $200 and $300 million each by then. Trudeau, praising the cooperation of the governments of Quebec and Toronto with the federal government on the issue, said they would get more money. Later in the year, Quebec got $250 million.

In mid-2018 newly elected Progressive Conservative premier Doug Ford announced the provincial government was withdrawing its support for the more than 3,000 refugees temporarily housed in Toronto, since "this mess was 100 percent the result of the federal government" and had created a housing crisis in the city. Ford's timing put the federal government in a difficult position, since some of the refugees were housed in college dormitories that had to be available for students before the end of the summer. Trudeau, after meeting with Ford, said that "it didn't seem to me that the Premier was quite as aware of our international obligations to the UN Convention on Refugees as he might have been. So I spent a little time explaining how the asylum-seeking system works and how our system is supposed to operate," remarks that Lisa MacLeod, Ford's Minister of Children, Community and Social Services, termed "disrespectful" on the Prime Minister's part. The federal government allocated $11 million of the $50 million it had offered Ontario to the Toronto city government.

Facing an election campaign late in 2019, the Liberal government took some actions. Early in the year a woman was charged in Quebec with organizing illegal entry into Canada for compensation at Roxham Road. Two months later, the government included a provision in its annual budget bill intended to partially address the flow of refugees to Roxham Road and other irregular border crossings. It barred anyone with an asylum claim pending in any of the other four Five Eyes countries Canada shares intelligence with—Australia, New Zealand, the U.K. and the U.S.—from applying for asylum in Canada. The intent was to frustrate "country shopping", Blair said. "If people are pursuing their claims in the United States, we wanted them to understand that they should stay there, because that's a safe place, and to pursue their claim in that place." The statute came into effect that June.

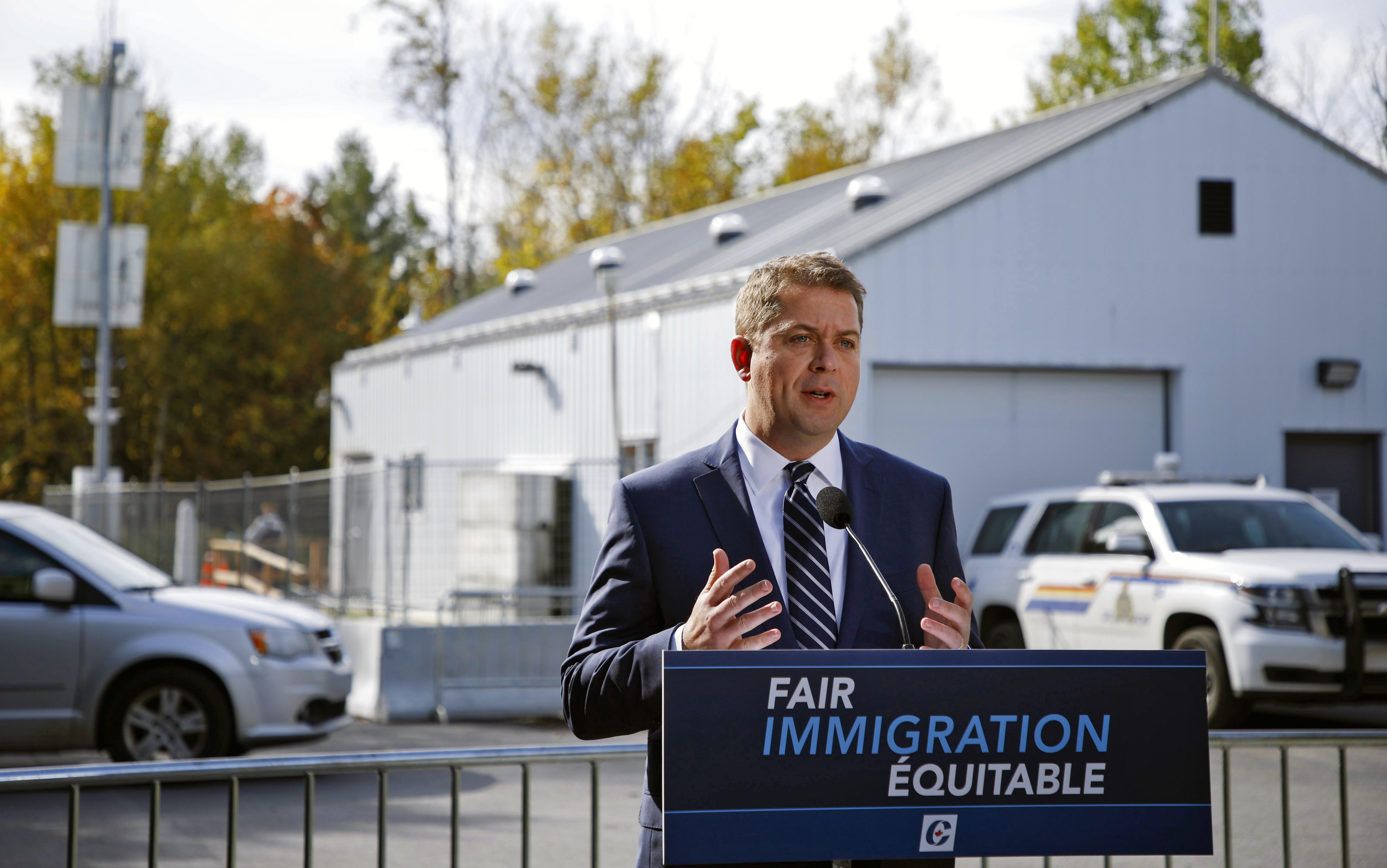
Scheer speaking at Roxham Road in October 2019

Opposition leader Andrew Scheer regularly said that irregular entrants were "jumping the queue" and "gaming the system" at the expense of lawful applicants. Hussen responded that Scheer was indulging in "the same sort of extreme right wing anti-immigration rhetoric that has become pervasive among right-wing populist parties around the world." Scheer had said he based that claim on letters he had read from refugees applying for asylum in Canada from camps abroad wondering how it was that people just walking into Canada could legitimately apply for asylum when they would not be able to enter until their applications were approved. It was pointed out that applicants abroad are primarily processed by the UN, not IRBC, so the irregular entrants were not tying up bureaucratic resources, so there was no queue to jump.

Scheer's Conservatives and the country's other parties began making their immigration and border policy proposals known. He said in an October speech at Roxham that Trudeau had created this problem and yet done nothing to address it in two years. The Conservatives would, by contrast, hire 250 more CBSA officers. He expressed concern that members of the Salvadoran gang MS-13 had been able to enter Canada through Roxham, and called for the country to withdraw from the UN's Global Compact for Migration and renegotiate the STCA to apply to the entire border, not just ports of entry. Rempel, his party's critic on the issue, had already suggested in 2018 that Canada declare its entire border to be a port of entry, a solution that was criticized as not only incapable of solving the problem but capable of creating others.

Parties on the government's left also pointed to the STCA as the root of the problem, indeed the problem. Both the New Democratic (NDP) and Green parties said they would, if in government, have Canada withdraw from it so that refugee applications could be processed at ports of entry. The NDP said it would also revoke the Five Eyes provision. "Canada has international obligations under the UN Refugee Convention and we must continue to provide protection to those who need it", it said in a statement. "We also have to ensure any changes to our asylum system are not buried in an omnibus budget bill."

Polls showed that nearly half of all Canadians believed that many irregular entrants were not genuine refugees, and almost two-thirds believed the system had been overwhelmed processing their applications. In the election, Trudeau's Liberals lost their majority outright, as well as the popular vote by a small plurality to Scheer's Conservatives, but held on to enough seats in the House of Commons to form a minority government.

Early in 2019 the overall amount of irregular crossers dropped from the year before, with only 6,864 coming into Canada that way through June. Of those, 6,460, or 94 percent, came through Roxham Road. For the rest of the year, for which separate figures for Roxham are not available, there was a slight increase in irregular crossings from 2018, with 9,293 total. Of that 16,157 annual total, 7,793, or 48 percent, were granted asylum.

As in 2018, Nigerians accounted for the largest share of refugees through June with 1,210 overall, a considerable drop from the previous year. Colombians, many fleeing violence in their homeland, along with an increasing share of Venezuelans, remained in second place with 645 making the crossing, also a decline from the year before. Haitians continued their decline, with 130 putting them in 10th; late in 2018 a U.S. court had blocked the TPS revocation as arbitrary and capricious. In third place for the first half of 2019 were refugees from the Democratic Republic of the Congo, with 485, likewise a drop from their numbers the year before.

=== 2020: Pandemic and court rulings ===
2020 began as the previous two years had on Roxham Road, with asylum seekers continuing to make the journey and cross the border despite the winter weather. In the first three months of the year, IRBC processed 3,489 irregular entrants, more than the same period the year before; it is not known exactly how many of those entered Canada through Roxham.

The situation changed abruptly in mid-March, as the rapidly spreading COVID-19 pandemic affected Canada and the U.S. Both countries drastically limited travel from elsewhere in the world and closed their border to all but essential traffic. Despite these restrictions, refugees still came to the dead end at Roxham and sought asylum. The pandemic did greatly reduce the flow of refugees at the crossing; in the second quarter of the year IRBC processed only 356 irregular entrants, a decline of almost 90 percent from the quarter before and slightly more than that from the same period in 2019.

Initially, the asylum seekers were required to quarantine and self-isolate for 14 days in a shelter near the crossing to prevent the spread of the disease. Both Peter Kent, the Conservatives' new immigration critic, and the Bloc Québécois, the PQ's federal counterpart, called for the government to shut down Roxham and the other illegal crossings completely. Kent said it would also be a good time for the government to withdraw from the STCA.

On March 20, the government announced that refugees crossing at Roxham and other locations between ports of entry would now be turned away entirely starting at midnight, invoking through several orders-in-council the emergency provisions of the Quarantine Act, 2005, unless their claim involved one of the exceptions from the STCA. By early April, only six had attempted to seek asylum and only one of those had been allowed to enter and apply for asylum. Immigration activists criticized the move since it many of those refugees turned away were likely to be imprisoned and deported to their home countries once returned to the U.S., which would put Canada in violation of the non-refoulement provisions of international law, under which asylum claimants are not to be returned to the countries they fled. An Afghan woman who had crossed at Roxham after finishing law school in the U.S. credited that decision with saving her life and excoriated Trudeau for effectively closing the crossing.

The Toronto Sun, which had been critical of Trudeau's government on immigration among many other issues, expressed gratitude for the closure. "It's obviously the right decision and should have been made a long time ago", the paper editorialized. "Let's hope they don't reopen it once COVID-19 is over."

In July Canadian Federal Court Justice Anne Marie McDonald ruled that the STCA was unconstitutional. The case had been brought by the Canadian Council for Refugees (CCR) against the IRBC. Among several witnesses was Nedira Jemal Mustafa, an Ethiopian woman who had lived in the U.S. since she came for medical treatment at 12. Unwilling to return to Ethiopia due to civil unrest there, and unaware that she needed to take steps if she wanted to remain in the U.S., she let her visa lapse. In April 2017 she went to the Blackpool border crossing and attempted to apply for asylum. Since the STCA prevented her from making the application at a port of entry, (Note: "Ironically," the National Post observed, "had Mustefa tried to cross the Canadian border a few kilometres away, at Roxham Rd., she would have been allowed in, permitted to make her claim and never would have become a test case." In some instances making the opposite decision has landed asylum claimants in U.S. detention. In 2021 the Toronto Star reported on the case of Roberto Carlos Teran Rivera, a Nicaraguan refugee who, having been allowed to join his wife in Canada after she applied for asylum, had received documentation allowing him to enter Canada in order to do so. But having returned to the U.S., from where he had been deported following his first attempt to reach Canada, he crossed the border at Roxham Road rather than an official port of entry. Since his documentation could only be properly processed at one of the latter, and pandemic restrictions were in effect, the RCMP gave him a form to present the next time he entered Canada so that his application could continue to be processed, and Teran Rivera assumed he could try again at a port of entry where, as a family member of an applicant already in Canada, he came under one of the STCA's exemptions. Shortly after returning to the U.S., he was taken into custody and then detained at a federal detention center in Batavia, New York, pending deportation. He has told the court that if released he plans to enter Canada at a port of entry and join his wife as he had originally intended.) she was returned to the U.S., whereupon she was taken into custody by the Border Patrol and held in a cold cell at Clinton Correctional Facility in nearby Dannemora for a month, during which she was also fed pork in violation of her faith. (Note: Allegations of mistreatment in detention by irregular entrants at Roxham Road have not been limited to those returned to the U.S. A Jordanian man who had moved to the U.S. after his family responded to him coming out to them as bisexual in his early 20s with threats of violence crossed at Roxham and applied for asylum in 2019 after the electronics store he had owned in Cleveland, Ohio, was robbed and vandalized with racist graffiti. Due to a past criminal charge in the U.S., his application was denied and he was detained; he was also denied re-entry into the U.S. While fighting deportation, since he believes his family will kill him if he returns to Jordan due not only to his sexuality but his change of religion, he has been taken back into detention by CBSA several times as a flight risk. In all of those detentions, which his attorney calls legally questionable, he says he has been subject to homophobic verbal abuse, sexually assaulted and made to wear an ankle bracelet that caused an infection. His lawyers are attempting to get him a temporary visa so he may remain free while his case is heard.)

McDonald held that since any refugee returned to the U.S. is usually detained, and Canadian officials knew this, Mustafa's treatment was entirely foreseeable and thus her constitutional rights, as well as those of all other refugees similarly detained, were violated. The decision would not take effect for six months. In October the Federal Court of Appeal granted the government's request for a stay pending further appeals. (Note: Michael Barutciski of Glendon College argued that the Canadian government should appeal the decision as he saw serious deficiencies in McDonald's opinion. He conceded that she was justifiably outraged by the treatment of Mustefa and other refugees introduced into evidence. But her contention that claimants returned to the U.S. were detained simply for having made refugee claims in Canada was, he noted, not supported by any evidence, nor did it make the inquiry into U.S. law and jurisprudence, particularly the rights of citizens under the Fourteenth Amendment and the Bill of Rights, that would have better supported a finding that the detention of Mustefa and other aliens returned from Canada was a violation of their rights. "The implication is that the authorities' use of detention has no legal basis", notwithstanding that lengthy legal history, Barutciski argues. "Canadian courts examining practices south of the border have to consider that the distinction between citizens/non-citizens is critical in the US with regards to identifying migrants' rights under the US constitution ... [H]ow can a Canadian court conclude there is a human rights violation resulting from the alleged behaviour of US officials without exploring the view of US courts?" Indeed, he writes, if that detention has a legal basis then it cannot be considered arbitrary and thus a violation of the returnees' rights. Barutciski also reminds Canadians that "we need to be reminded of our own interdiction practices unless we want to appear as hypocrites". As Tony Keller had also pointed out, Canada relies on bureaucracy as much as geography to restrict immigration, particularly outside official channels. "Canada is a model for migration control intended to discourage potential asylum seekers." Barutciski wrote. "This is why some migrants from poor countries obtained US visas to fly to New York City before taking the bus/taxi to Roxham Road on the Quebec border. They would never have received Canadian visas." The Trump administration's 2017 travel ban, referred to throughout McDonald's opinion as the "Muslim ban", was actually closer to the Canadian approach to immigration control.)

The pandemic had a beneficial effect for some migrants who had already entered Canada. In August the government granted permanent residency to those applicants who had cared for COVID-19 patients in hospitals and long-term care, a service that was particularly appreciated in Quebec. To be eligible they had to have had an asylum application pending since before March 13, worked 120 hours in patient care as of August 14 and be on track to have worked in health care for six months by August 31, 2021. Approximately a thousand asylum seekers were eligible.

In September a U.S. appeals court overruled one of the lower courts that had blocked the Trump administration's revocation of TPS for several nationalities, including Haitians. The decision, as one of the three judges on the panel noted, had no practical effect since an earlier decision by a different lower federal court granting the same preliminary injunction remained in effect. U.S. Citizenship and Immigration Services announced that TPS would remain in effect for Haitians as long as the injunction did, but that work permits would remain in effect through October 2021.

In the latter half of 2020 less than 300 irregular entrants had their applications accepted for processing. Late in the year the Canadian government began allowing some irregular entrants to apply for asylum under the "national interest" exemption to its travel restrictions, which had most notably been used earlier in the year to allow European professional hockey players to travel in and out of Canada in order for the National Hockey League to complete its season. Refugee advocates, noting the accounts of irregular entrants, like Mustefa, denied admission to Canada and then detained on their return to the U.S., took the move as a tacit admission by the government that its original plans were not working out. A U.S. Customs and Border Protection spokeswoman said that returnees from Canada were not likely to be removed if they had valid documentation to remain in the U.S.

=== 2021–2022: Reopening ===
IRBC recorded accepting the applications of 193 irregular entrants in the first quarter of 2021. In April Canada's Federal Court of Appeal (FCA) reversed the lower court's decision from the year before that the STCA was unconstitutional. Justice David Stratas wrote unanimously for the three-judge panel that, as Glendon College's Michael Barutciski had suggested, found McDonald's decision fatally flawed, primarily on procedural grounds. Stratas suggested the claimants case was properly against the administrative procedures involved in making the decision to return Mustefa and the other applicants to the U.S., not the statute and regulations authorizing those processes, and for that challenge they did not have enough evidence. The court also found that McDonald had been in error when she found that returned refugees were automatically detained as it contradicted evidence that detention in the U.S. was discretionary, not mandatory, and that irregular entrants to Canada faced the same risk under law, mooting the issue. In any event a Canadian court could not apply the Charter to the actions of a foreign government.

Marco Mendicino, who had succeeded Hussen as Immigration Minister, said the STCA would continue to be enforced at the border. "For the last three years," he said in a statement, "Canada has welcomed more refugees than any other country in the world, and continues to provide protection to those fleeing conflict and persecution ... The STCA remains a comprehensive means for the compassionate, fair, and orderly handling of asylum claims at the Canada-U.S. land border."

Refugee advocates were dismayed, with one calling the decision "a step backward for human rights". Lawyers argued that the FCA had, in holding that detention upon return to the US was merely discretionary, ignored evidence that it was a likely outcome for most. And while they agreed with the court that their case implicated the process rather than the law, they complained that it was difficult to mount such a challenge due to the government's reluctance to share records of the process due to confidentiality requirements.

In August, Canada reopened its border to American visitors with proof of vaccination; the next month this permission was extended to all vaccinated foreign nationals. This led to refugees who had been sent back to the U.S. returning to Roxham in the belief that they would again be allowed to cross and make asylum claims, leading to a significant rise in crossings for the first time since the beginning of the pandemic. Most were again refused and while some were detained by U.S. immigration authorities many were sheltered in hotels and apartments in Plattsburgh in the meantime; according to a local aid worker there were more than a hundred families in this situation at one point.

At the same time, refugees who had been turned back earlier in the pandemic started getting called back to the border to finish their applications; those who could prove vaccination were prioritized. In late November, after 121 refugees had been allowed to re-enter this way, Canada announced that it would process new applications at irregular crossing points like Roxham again. Most of the refugees who had temporarily sheltered in Plattsburgh left for Roxham as soon as word of the reopening reached them.

There was reaction from critics on both political sides of the Trudeau government's immigration policy. Sun columnist Lilley suggested that the real beneficiary of the reopening would be businesses and special interests on both sides of the border that promoted and benefited from the traffic at Roxham. He allowed that the newly elected Biden Administration's lowered enthusiasm for enforcing deportation orders might reduce the flow as asylum seekers felt less urgency to enter Canada, but still reminded his readers that Roxham and the other irregular crossings were "outside the normal and legal channels" for immigrants. CCR director Janet Dench approved of the crossing's reopening, but said it should never have been closed in the first place. She also renewed her call for Canada to exit the STCA.

At the end of the year, La Presse reported that Mélanie Joly, Canada's Minister of Foreign Affairs, had reached an agreement with her U.S. counterpart, U.S. Secretary of State Antony Blinken, on an expansion of the STCA that would allow Canada to refuse entry to asylum seekers regardless of where they enter Canada. This would allow the government to legally close Roxham Road. But for the new agreement to come into force, both sides would have to issue updated regulations; until then, authorities expected the irregular crossings at Roxham to continue.

In 2022, it was reported that following the relaxation of the pandemic restrictions, irregular entries into Canada had reached their highest level since mid-2017, with 2,811 crossing in December 2021, mostly in Quebec, and numbers for early 2022 remaining above 2,000 per month (reported to be about 7,000 total by the middle of the year). Many had been waiting in the U.S. or Latin America for the reopening. A Montreal lawyer who has represented some of those who have crossed said he believed that many migrants did not believe that the change in U.S. presidential administrations had led to any significant changes in immigration policy and they were still more likely to be granted residency in Canada.

Legault asked the federal government to close the Roxham Road crossing in May, saying Quebec's public and private social resources to take care of them were being stressed. Advocates for refugees disputed that. "The refugee organizations in Montreal have said very clearly that they do have capacity," said Wendy Ayotte, one of the founders of Bridges Not Borders, a local organization that assists asylum seekers at Roxham, who lives near the crossing. She and other advocates warned that if Roxham were to be closed, smuggling and its attendant risks to asylum seekers would increase.

During the 2022 provincial election, Conservative Party of Quebec leader Éric Duhaime talked again about the possibility of building a wall at the road.

=== 2023: STCA renegotiation and permanent closure ===
In January 2023 Canada reported nearly 5,000 crossings at Roxham, more than twice as many as that month the year before. In late March the two countries announced that they had agreed to new terms for the STCA that would discourage crossings at Roxham by allowing either country to deport to the other country noncitizens who have illegally or irregularly crossed the border and requested asylum within 14 days of entry. Canada also agreed to make 15,000 spaces available for asylum applicants from the Western Hemisphere each year.

As the number of asylum seekers dwindled as a result of the new agreement, the crossing was shut down permanently on March 25, 2023, after upwards of 100,000 entered Canada through it. The processing facility building was demolished on September 25.

=== Local support ===
Canadians in Lacolle and Hemmingford have formed Bridges Not Borders, or Créons des Ponts ("Let's Build Bridges") in French, to support and assist irregular crossers. Its work is complemented on the U.S. side by Plattsburgh Cares, which aroused some controversy in Canada for producing multilingual pamphlets advising refugees on not only how to reach and cross the border safely but how to apply for asylum once in Canada. Hussen and Rempel said the pamphlet painted an overly simple and vague picture of how the Canadian asylum system works. The two groups work together.

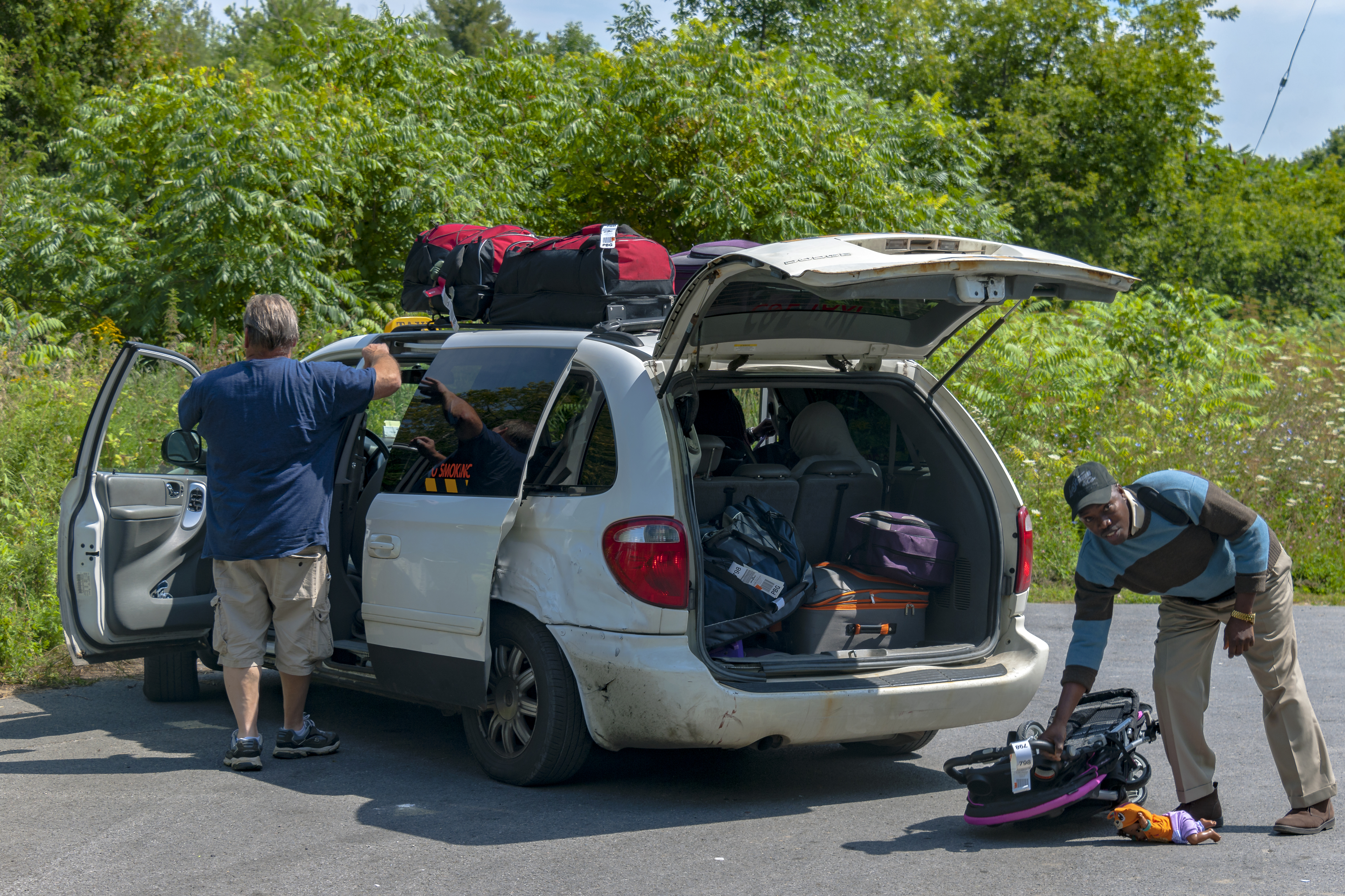
Migrants unloading a taxi at the U.S. end of Roxham Road, 2017

Taxi drivers in the Plattsburgh area, some of whom have been the subject of a CBC documentary short, Road to Roxham, have found the refugees to be lucrative passengers; some have even gone into the business strictly to transport refugees to the end of Roxham. They await arrivals at Plattsburgh International Airport, the city's train station and the Greyhound bus depot at a gas station on U.S. Route 9 just north of the city. Many have posted decals on their vehicles giving fare information for Roxham Road, a half-hour, 25-mile (40 km) trip from Plattsburgh. Those refugees who do not come by bus are brought to Roxham, or the bus depot, by smugglers from all over the U.S. who charge a thousand dollars or more and place Uber and Lyft decals on their vehicles to allay suspicion.

=== Demographics ===
Based on figures for irregular entrants at Roxham Road specifically provided by the IRBC to the Migration Policy Institute (MPI) under a memorandum of understanding, for the 26 months between April 2017 and June 2019, over 40,000 migrants entered Canada there, around 90 percent of the total of 45,000 irregular entrants who sought asylum during that period. They came from 28 countries as well as the Palestinian Territories, in Africa, the Middle East and Latin America. Of those, Nigerians formed the largest group by nationality, with 12,490, accounting for either the second most or the most in each of the three calendar years. Haitians were second, at 6,500, the great majority of whom made the crossing in 2017.

The third largest group gave "United States" as its country of origin, with 1,650. According to the MPI, 3,500 crossers were also U.S. citizens, often the dependents of those they crossed with. The non-citizens, other than the Haitians and Salvadorans fearing the revocation of their TPS, were aliens who had lived in the U.S. for years, often undocumented after having overstayed visas or being denied asylum. Many said they feared crackdowns under Trump and the possibility of deportation to bleak prospects in their countries of origin.

The other migrants, whose tenure in the U.S. was limited only to the time it took them to get to Roxham Road, were divided between those who came to the U.S. legally and those who did not. The former were able to pay for their own travel and visas; the latter had often traveled to a third country in Latin America, more accessible to them legally and financially, and from there begun the long journey north. Migrants told the MPI about dangerous passages through the Darién Gap in Panama, having to leave dead family members behind, being targeted by criminal gangs in Mexico and again risking their lives at the U.S. border. Some said that after being released from detention when they were caught in those areas by the Border Patrol, aid groups they contacted suggested they go to Canada and attempt to claim asylum there.

Stated nationalities did not tell the whole story for some groups. Many Yemenis, Sudanese and Palestinians who came to Roxham Road had actually been living in Saudi Arabia before being expelled after their work permits were cancelled as part of that country's "Saudization" efforts to increase the native composition of its workforce. The Yemenis generally did not want to return home to a country in the throes of its civil war and the Palestinians feared being rendered stateless if they did not make the attempt to resettle in Canada (indeed, 320 of the Roxham entrants described themselves as stateless at the time). Many of those displaced from Saudi Arabia told the MPI that from early 2017 the possibility of entering Canada through Roxham had been widely discussed in their social circles and online networks.

Beyond possible immigration difficulties in the U.S., refugees gave many reasons for making the crossing. Some were political: a Burundian man said he had been abducted, beaten, and told to leave the country after whistleblowing on government corruption; his claim was rejected and he was deported to the U.S. where he remained in detention due to Burundi's lack of cooperation with the U.S. removal process, a complaint shared by the Canadian government. Another early Burundian crosser likewise said his wife had been killed in political violence there. Gang or family violence was another driver, particularly among those from Latin America. Yet others feared persecution over their sexuality. Canada is more likely to grant asylum in both those cases than the U.S.

== See also ==
- Immigration to Canada
- Florin Fodor, a Romanian who, after being deported from Canada twice, took an open boat through Arctic waters from Greenland to Grise Fiord in an attempt to return for a third stay
- Gander International Airport, in Newfoundland, where passengers from the Eastern Bloc often defected to Canada during refueling stops on flights to Cuba during the Cold War
