= La Meute =

Quebec nationalist movement

- Founding leader: Éric Venne and Patrick Beaudry
- Founded: September 2015
- Country: Canada
- Active regions: Quebec
- Ideology: Quebec nationalism anti-Islam anti-immigration
- Political position: Center left (per La Meute's spokesman Sylvain Brouillette); Right wing to Far-right (debated)
- Size: 4,000 to 41,000 members (April 2018)

La Meute (French pronunciation: [la møt], 'The Pack') is a Quebec nationalist pressure group and identitarian movement that opposes illegal immigration and radical Islam. The group was founded in September 2015 in Quebec by two former Canadian Armed Forces members, Éric Venne and Patrick Beaudry. Neither are members of the group anymore. In 2018, the goal of La Meute was to prevent the Quebec Liberal Party from winning the 2018 Quebec general election (which the Liberal party did lose). La Meute does not plan to become a political party, but rather "to become large enough and organized enough to constitute a force that can't be ignored".

Members of the group participated in the Unite the Right rally in 2017.

Most political observers identify La Meute as far-right. The group rejects this. As of April 2018, the group has more than 41,000 members in its private Facebook group; however, some journalists believe there are only 4,000 to 5,000 members based on reports of numbers inflation by ex-members.

In 2019, La Meute supported the New Coalition Avenir Québec (CAQ) government Bill 21 which bars civil servants in ‘authority’, such as judges, prosecutors, police officers, teachers and school administrators from wearing religious symbols at work. The leader of CAQ sought to distance himself from the group.

== Political position ==
Police officers, experts, and the majority of journalists identify La Meute as far-right. The group is considered islamophobic, supremacist, ultranationalist, or even populist by some.

La Meute is, according to Maxime Fiset, "on the limit of the spectrum of what is far-right" and corresponds to, according to David Morin, a "populist and nationalistic-identitarian far-right fringe". David Morin hesitates between the terms "identitarian far-right" and "right-wing populism", and notes there are "communicating vessels" between more radical groups, like Atalante and, sometimes, Storm Alliance.

The group is often differentiated from racist, supremacist, neo-Nazis and neo-fascists groups by observers, experts, and journalists. Quebec police do not consider La Meute to be a threat. There is debate over whether "far-right" is the best descriptor for La Meute. Some believe we call them far-right "a bit foolishly", declaring "it's difficult to find anything to condemn this group". Finally, some journalists oppose La Meute's public image to its private Facebook group.

La Meute rejects the "far-right" label and is known to regularly delete overtly racist comments, or comments inciting violence. Some journalists doubt this, arguing that the Facebook group shows "numerous references to Muhammad as a pedophile or rapist" and that it can be invalidated "by simply typing "pig" in the search bar". La Meute is known to expel its members who are overtly racist. La Meute's spokesman, Sylvain Brouillette, identifies La Meute as center left.

During Quebec's 2018 general election, Brouillette stated that La Meute was directly inspired by the 2014 electoral program of the Coalition Avenir Québec but the group's party leader, François Legault, has tried to distance his party from this claim.

== See also ==
- Religious intolerance
- Identitarian movement
- Illegal immigration to Canada
- Radical Islam
- Roxham Road
- Islamophobia
- Far-right politics
