= Storm Alliance =

Anti-immigration group in Canada

The Storm Alliance is a Canadian anti-immigration group which is primarily based in Quebec. It describes itself as an "ultranationalist" organization and it opposes the Canadian government's immigration policies, which it calls "collective suicide". The group has drawn attention for staging protests in Lacolle, Quebec, against asylum seekers who enter Canada across the Canada–United States border on Roxham Road. It has called them "illegal immigrants" and has demanded the Government of Canada reimburse the province of Quebec for the costs incurred for handling them.

Various media sources and political commentators have called the Storm Alliance a far-right organization. Tregget insists that his movement is "ultranationalist" rather than far-right. Rachel Brown and Ben Makuch wrote in Vice Magazine that the Storm Alliance denies its far-right affiliations in order to attract more "moderate" followers.

== History ==
The Storm Alliance was founded in December 2016 by Dave Tregget, who previously founded the Quebec chapter of the Finnish far-right group Soldiers of Odin. The group denies any connection to the Soldiers of Odin, and Tregget is no longer president of the Storm Alliance. The group has participated in protests alongside other far-right groups in Quebec such as La Meute and Atalante.

An estimated 200 Storm Alliance members took part in a major anti-immigration rally in September 2017, leading to a conflict with pro-refugee counter-protesters.

In 2018, the Storm Alliance disrupted a meeting at a school in Quebec City held by Canadian Prime Minister Justin Trudeau. A man whose ties to the organization remain unclear waved a Canadian flag imposed with a swastika and the words "evil empire" on top of it was escorted out of the room by RCMP officers.

After a 2018 investigation into a pair of defunct Facebook groups, the Parti Québécois was accused of "showing a growing coziness" to far-right organizations, which included the Storm Alliance and La Meute, by the anti-racist activist Jeff Ray. The report revealed that numerous active participants and administrators on pro-PQ pages were also listed on the SA's page, and it also revealed that the two groups were developing closer ties, in addition to spreading disinformation about immigrants. Ray initially published the study on his blog, but it was reprinted by the Montreal Gazette.

In 2019, two people with ties to the group were arrested after they were caught plotting to kill Justin Trudeau while they were having a conversation on Facebook. One of them was charged with incitement to genocide against Muslims by the Royal Canadian Mounted Police. Storm Alliance's Facebook page responded that it had kicked out the two a few months before, adding that it did not endorse their views.
