= Douglas M. Kruhm =

U.S. Border Patrol Chief (1945–2022)

Chief of United States Border Patrol
- In office 1995–1998
- President: Bill Clinton
- Preceded by: Michael S. Williams
- Succeeded by: Gustavo de la Viña

Personal details
- Born: January 16, 1945 Olney, Maryland, U.S.
- Died: September 11, 2022 (aged 77) Berryville, Virginia, U.S.

Douglas M. Kruhm (January 16, 1945 – September 11, 2022) was a former chief of the United States Border Patrol.

== Career ==
Douglas M. Kruhm joined the United States Border Patrol (USBP) on October 3, 1967, after completing the 90th Session of the Border Patrol Academy. While been station in Washington DC Douglas M. Kruhm was appointed Chief of United States Border Patrol by president Bill Clinton. He retired from the Border Patrol in 1998, concluding a 30-year career. He was an advocate for Operation Blockade. Most of his retired years he served on the National Board of the National Border Patrol Museum.

== Death ==
Douglas M. Kruhm died on September 11, 2022, in Berryville, Virginia at the age of 77. He was buried at Hillsboro Cemetery, in Hillsboro, Virginia.
