= Michael J. Fisher =

Chief of United States Border Patrol from 2010 to 2015

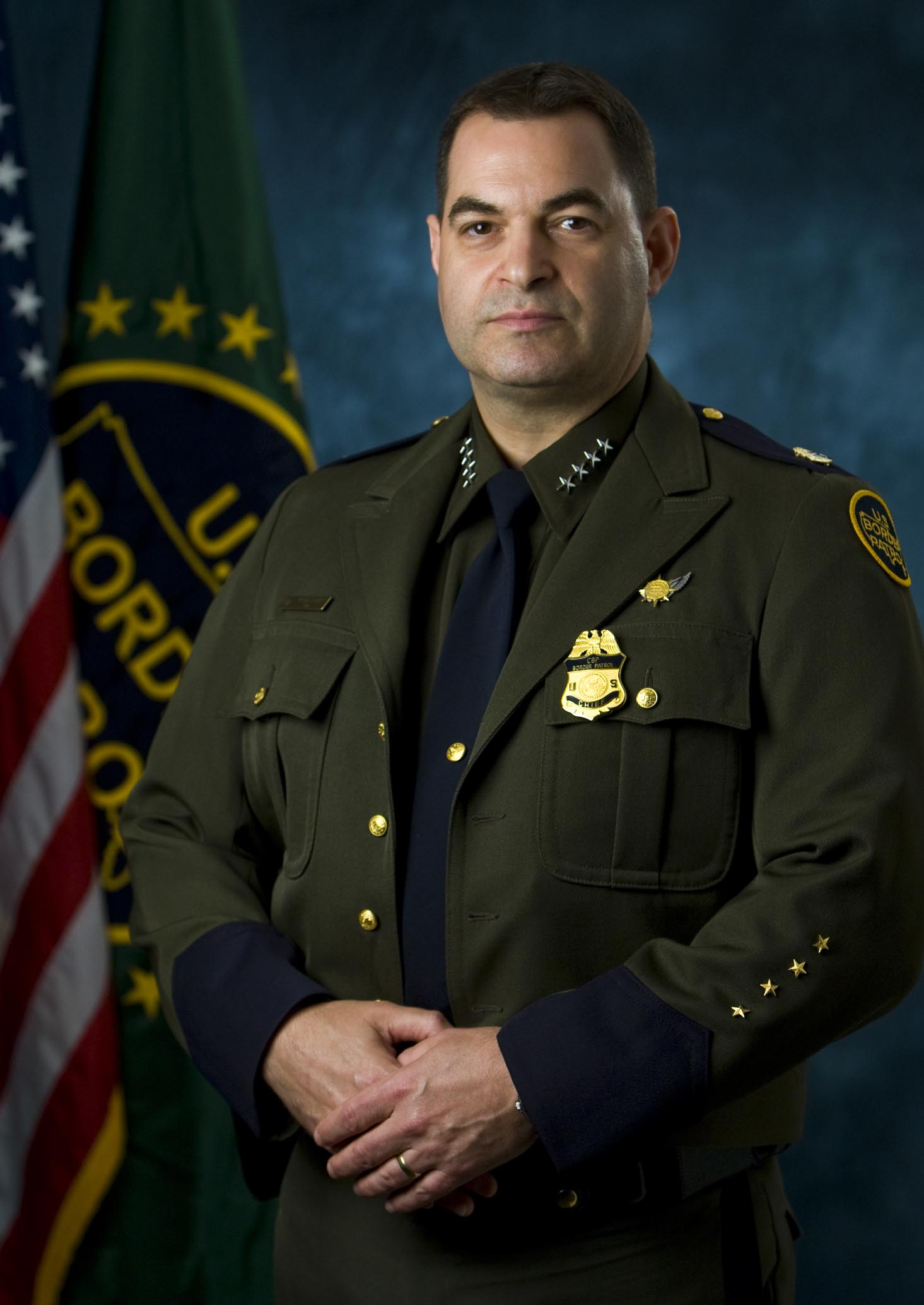

Chief of United States Border Patrol
- In office May 9, 2010 – November 30, 2015
- President: Barack Obama
- Preceded by: David V. Aguilar
- Succeeded by: Ron Vitiello (acting)

Personal details
- Education: John F. Kennedy School of Government (BCJ, MBA)

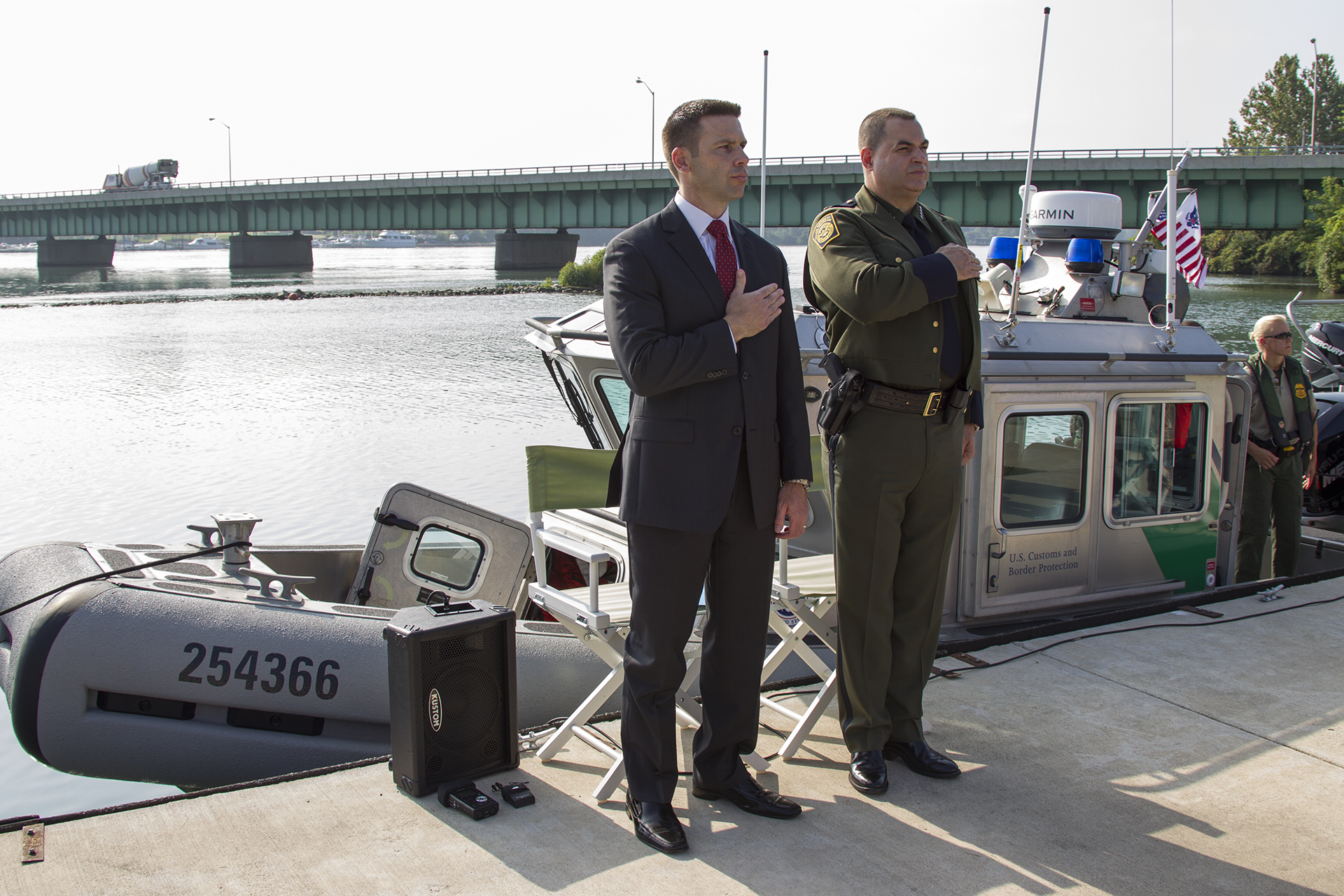
Fisher (right) and Kevin McAleenan, CBP acting deputy commissioner, attend dedication ceremony for CBP Vessel Brian A. Terry in 2013

Michael J. Fisher served as Chief of the United States Border Patrol and was a member of the Senior Executive Service from 2010 to 2015. He was responsible for planning, organizing, coordinating, and directing enforcement efforts to secure the United States' borders.

Alan Bersin, former Commissioner of U.S. Customs and Border Protection (CBP), described Fisher as "an innovative leader among his peers and highly respected within the law enforcement community."

== Public service ==
Fisher entered the United States Border Patrol in 1987, His first duty assignment was as Border Patrol agent at the Tucson Sector Douglas Station in Douglas, Arizona. In 1990, he was selected for the Border Patrol Tactical Unit (BORTAC), and later served as BORTAC Field Operations Supervisor in El Paso, Texas. Fisher served as Deputy Chief Patrol Agent of the Detroit Sector, and then Assistant Chief Patrol Agent in the Tucson Sector, where he was recognized as "Manager of the Year". In 2003, he was appointed Deputy Director of CBPs Office of Anti-Terrorism in Washington. He then served as Associate Chief of the U.S. Border Patrol, and was promoted to Senior Associate Chief in 2004. Fisher served as Deputy Chief Patrol Agent of the San Diego Sector in 2006, and was promoted to Chief Patrol Agent there in 2007. In 2010, he was named Acting Chief of the U.S. Border Patrol, and then Chief on May 9, 2010.

Fisher announced his retirement in October 2015, after serving 28 years with the U.S. Border Patrol.

== Education ==
Fisher has a bachelor's degree in criminal justice and a master's degree in business administration. He attended the John F. Kennedy School of Government, and completed the Capstone Military Leadership Program in 2009 at the National Defense University.

Political offices
Preceded by David V. Aguilar	Chief of the Border Patrol; 2010–2015	Succeeded by Ron Vitiello; Acting
