= Gustavo de la Viña =

U.S. Border Patrol Chief (1939–2009)

Chief of United States Border Patrol
- In office 1998–2004
- President: Bill Clinton; George W. Bush
- Preceded by: Douglas M. Kruhm
- Succeeded by: David V. Aguilar

Personal details
- Born: June 24, 1939 Edinburg, Texas, U.S.
- Died: October 26, 2009 (aged 70) Bosnia-Herzegovina
- Education: University of Texas–Pan American (BPE)

Gustavo de la Viña (June 24, 1939 – October 26, 2009) was the first Mexican American to serve as chief of the United States Border Patrol.

== Early life and education ==
Gustavo de la Viña graduated from Edinburg High School. He graduated from what was then known as Pan American University in 1963 earning a Bachelor of Physical Education.

== Career ==
Entered duty in the United States Border Patrol in 1970 assigned to the Eagle Pass, Texas, port of entry. He taught Spanish to future border patrol agents at the Federal Law Enforcement Training Center in Glynco, Georgia. Became Deputy Chief Patrol Agent at El Paso sector chief from 1984 to 1990 in El Paso, Texas. De la Viña went on to serve for four years as Chief Patrol Agent at the San Diego sector in San Diego, California. During his time in San Diego, De la Viña implemented Operation Gatekeeper. Was Western regional director for the Immigration and Naturalization Service from 1995 to 1997. Gustavo de la Viña was promoted to Chief of the United States Border Patrol in December 1997 and remained in that post until his retirement from the Border Patrol in 2004.

After retiring from the Border Patrol Gustavo de la Viña became an adviser to the International Criminal Investigative Training Assistance Program (ICITAP) within the United States Department of Justice.

During Gustavo de la Viña career in public service he received a Distinguished Executive in the Senior Executive Service (1999), Meritorious Executive in the Senior Executive Service (2002). the United States Attorney General's Distinguished Service Award (twice granted) and the Presidential Rank Award.

== Death ==
De la Viña died on October 26, 2009, at age 70 while he was an ICITAP adviser in the republic of Bosnia-Herzegovina. He was buried at the Queen of Heaven Catholic Cemetery in Mesa, Arizona.
