= United States Border Patrol =

Federal law enforcement agency

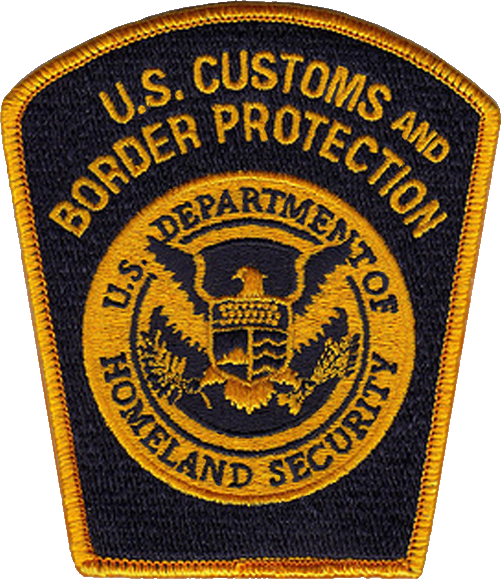
- Right sleeve patch

- Seal and left sleeve patch of the United States Border Patrol

- USBP badge

- USBP flag
- Abbreviation: USBP
- Motto: Honor First

Agency overview
- Formed: May 28, 1924; 102 years ago

Jurisdictional structure
- Federal agency (Operations jurisdiction): United States
- Operations jurisdiction: United States
- Area: 20,500 lineal miles (33,000 km)
- Legal jurisdiction: INA 235 & INA 287. Title 8 USC, 18 USC, 19 USC & 21 USC
- Governing body: Department of Homeland Security
- General nature: Federal law enforcement
- Specialist jurisdiction: National border patrol, security, integrity

Operational structure
- Headquarters: Washington, D.C., U.S.
- Agents: 22,000 (Congress Mandated)
- Agency executive: Rosario 'Pete' Vasquez, Chief
- Parent agency: U.S. Customs and Border Protection

Website
- cbp.gov

The United States Border Patrol (USBP) is a federal law enforcement agency under United States Customs and Border Protection (CBP) and is responsible for securing the borders of the United States. According to its website as of 2022, its mission is to "Protect the American people, safeguard our borders, and enhance the nation’s economic prosperity."

With 19,648 agents in 2019, the Border Patrol is one of the largest law enforcement agencies in the United States. For fiscal year 2017, Congress enacted a budget of $3,805,253,000 for the Border Patrol.

== History ==
Throughout most of the nineteenth century, United States' borders were open and unrestricted; there was no systematic control or even recordkeeping of immigrants. The first legislation restricting immigration, after the Act Prohibiting Importation of Slaves of 1807, was the Chinese Exclusion Act of 1882.

Mounted watchmen of the United States Department of Commerce and Labor patrolled the border in an effort to prevent illegal crossings as early as 1904, but their efforts were irregular and undertaken only when resources permitted. The inspectors, usually called "mounted guards", operated out of El Paso, Texas. Though they never totaled more than 75, they patrolled as far west as California trying to restrict the flow of illegal Chinese immigration.

In March 1915, Congress authorized a separate group of mounted guards, often referred to as "mounted inspectors". Most rode on horseback, but a few operated automobiles, motorcycles, and boats. Although these inspectors had broader arrest authority, they still largely pursued Chinese aliens trying to avoid the National Origins Act and Chinese Exclusion Act of 1882. These patrolmen were immigration inspectors, assigned to inspection stations, and could not watch the border at all times. U.S. Army soldiers along the southwest border performed intermittent border patrolling, but this was secondary to "the more serious work of military training". Aliens encountered illegally in the U.S. by the Army were directed to the immigration inspection stations. Texas Rangers were also sporadically assigned to patrol duties by the state, and their efforts were noted as "singularly effective".

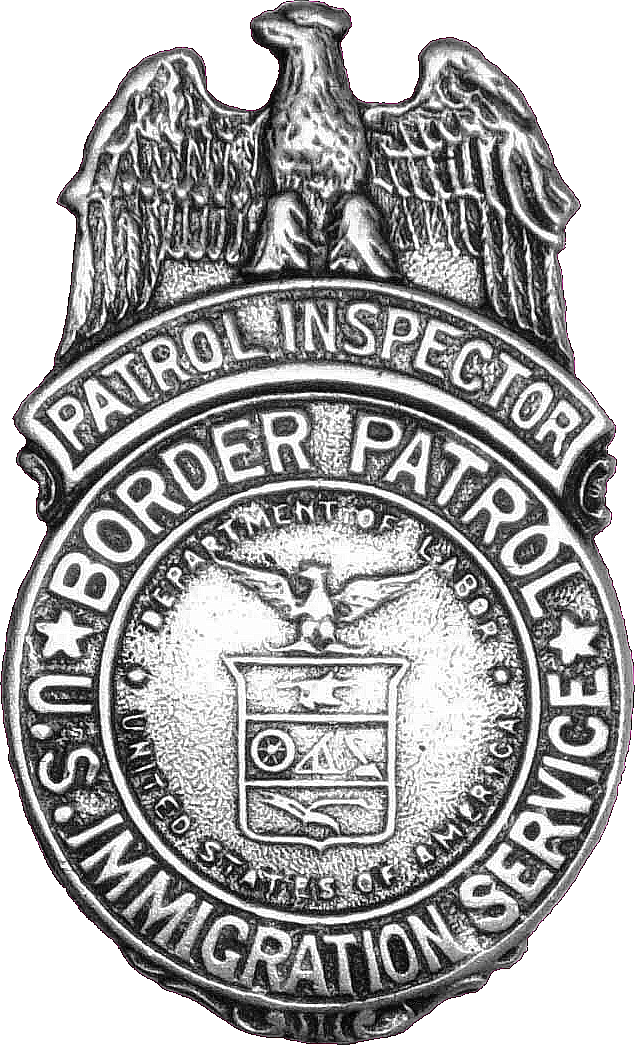
Former badge when the agency was under the Dept. of Labor (1920–1940)

The former badge, when the agency was under the Dept. of Justice (1940–2003)

The current badge after the agency became a part of Homeland Security (2003–)

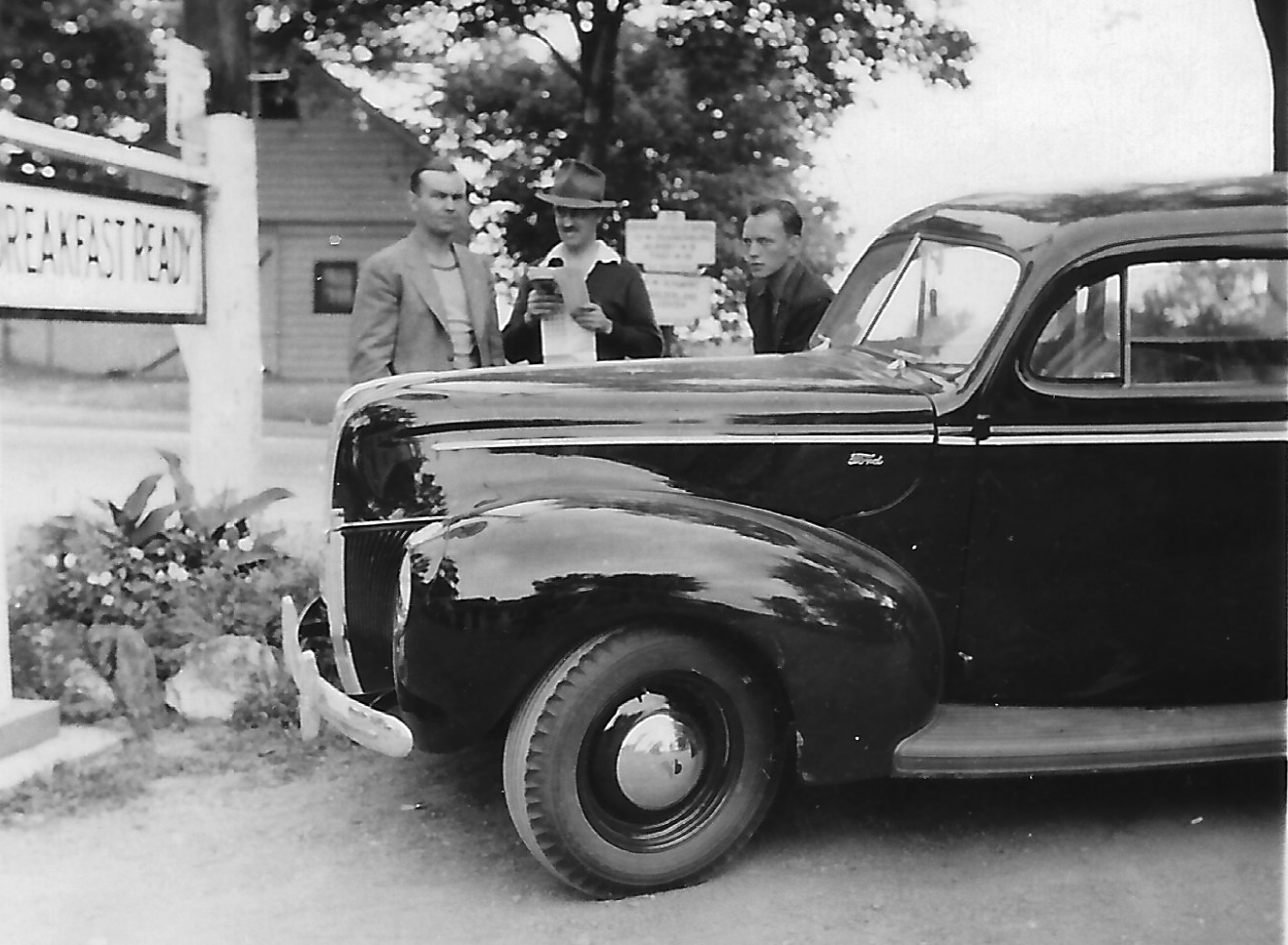
During the 1940 Border Patrol expansion, four newly hired agents from the northeastern states drove this new pursuit vehicle from the Ford factory in Detroit to El Paso where they received training.

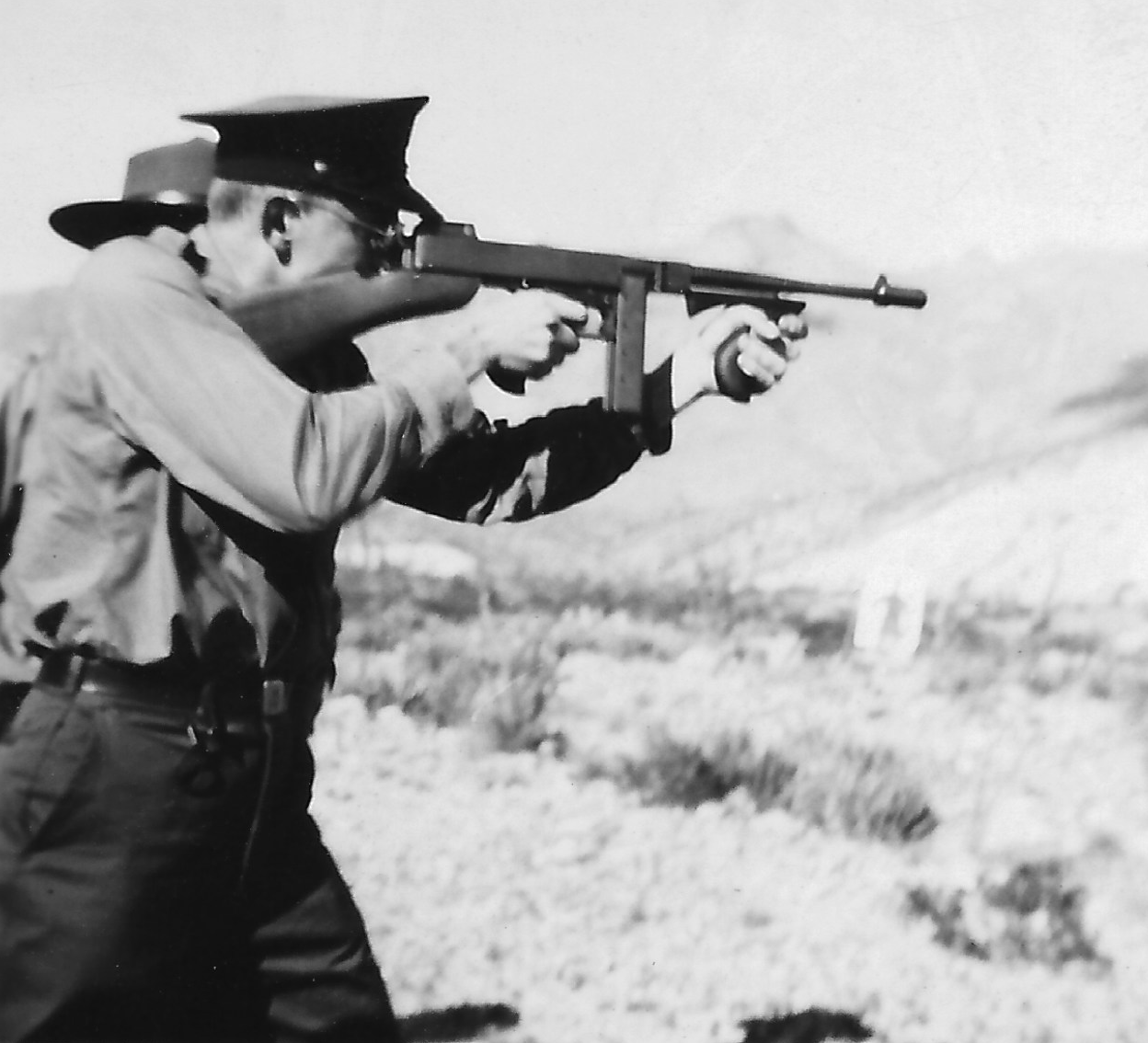
A Border Patrol agent practice firing a Thompson submachine gun near El Paso in 1940

The National Origins Act authorized the formation of the U.S. Border Patrol on May 26, 1924. Two days later, the Labor Appropriation Act of 1924 established the Border Patrol as an agency of the U.S. Department of Labor assigned to prevent illegal entries—primarily along the Mexico–United States border, as well as the Canada–U.S. border. The first Border Patrol station began operations in Detroit, Michigan, in June 1924. A second station, in El Paso, Texas, began operations in July 1924. In 1925, coastal patrols began as well. Operations were established along the Gulf Coast in 1927 to ensure that foreign crewmen departed on the same ship on which they arrived. In 1932, the Border Patrol was divided into two offices. Mexican border operations were directed from El Paso, Texas, and Canadian border operations were directed from Detroit, Michigan. The Canadian border operations from Detroit employed more men than the El Paso operations along the Mexican border because of a focus on the prevention of liquor smuggling during prohibition. Franklin Delano Roosevelt's Executive Order 6166 formed the Immigration and Naturalization Service (INS) in 1933 by consolidation of the Bureau of Immigration and the Bureau of Naturalization. Following the outbreak of World War II in Europe, Border Patrol staffing doubled to 1,500 in 1940, and the INS was moved from the Department of Labor to the U.S. Department of Justice. Additional stations were temporarily added along the Gulf Coast, Florida and the Eastern Seaboard during the 1960s after Fidel Castro triumphed in the Cuban Revolution, and that was followed by the Cuban Missile Crisis.

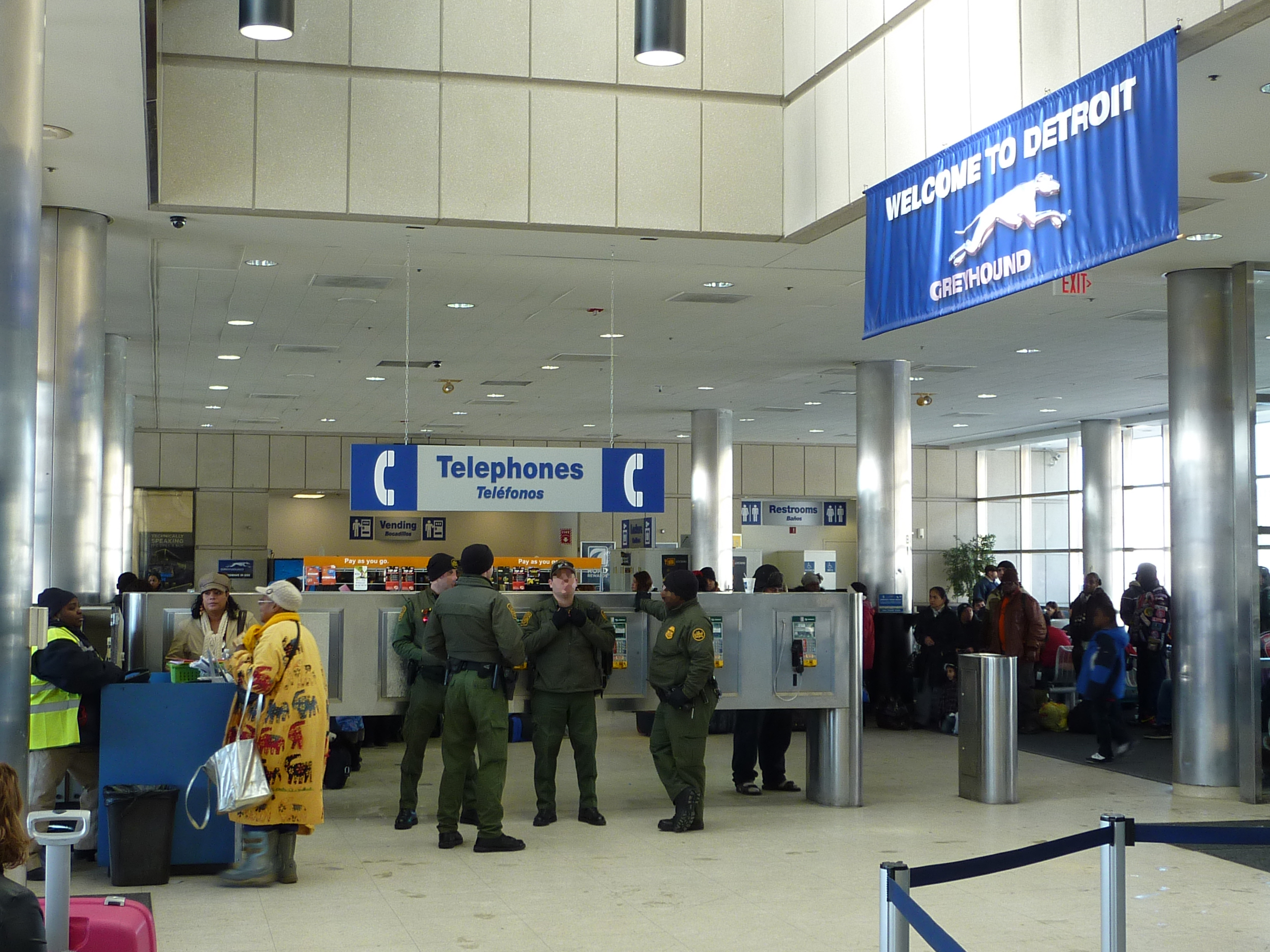
U.S. Border Patrol Agents at the Greyhound bus station in Detroit, Michigan, in February 2011. Immigration checks on trains, buses, and highways within 100 miles of the northern border have become more common.

In 1992, the United States Border Patrol had approximately 4,139 patrol agents on the job. Attrition in the Border Patrol was normally at 5%. From 1995 to 2001 annual attrition rose to above 10%, which was a period when the Border Patrol was undergoing massive hiring. In 2002 the attrition rate climbed to 18%. The 18% attrition was largely attributed to agents transferring to the Federal Air Marshals after the September 11 attacks. In 2017, the attrition rate was at 6%.

The INS was decommissioned in March 2003 when its operations were divided between U.S. Customs and Border Protection (CBP), U.S. Citizenship and Immigration Services, and U.S. Immigration and Customs Enforcement. The Intelligence Reform and Terrorism Prevention Act of 2004 (signed by President Bush on December 17, 2004) authorized hiring an additional 10,000 agents, "subject to appropriation". This authorization nearly doubled the Border Patrol size, from 11,000 to 20,000 agents by 2010. As of 2016, roughly half of the agents are Latino Americans. The Border Patrol has the lowest proportion of female agents or officers of any federal agency.

The Secure Fence Act, signed by President Bush on October 26, 2006, has met with much opposition. In October 2007, environmental groups and concerned citizens filed a restraining order hoping to halt the construction of the fence, set to be built between the United States and Mexico. The act mandated that the fence be built by December 2008. Ultimately, the United States seeks to put fencing around the 1,945-mile (3,130 km) border, but the act requires only 700 miles (1,100 km) of fencing. DHS secretary Michael Chertoff has bypassed environmental and other oppositions with a waiver that was granted to him by Congress in Section 102 of the act, which allows DHS to avoid any conflicts that would prevent a speedy assembly of the fence.

This action had many environment groups and landowners speaking out against the construction of the fence. Environment and wildlife groups feared that the plans to clear brush, construct fences, install bright lights, motion sensors, and cameras would scare wildlife and endanger the indigenous species of the area. Environmentalists said that the ecosystem could be affected because a border fence would restrict movement of many animal species, which in turn would keep them from water and food sources on one side or another. Desert plants could also feel the impact, as they would be uprooted in many areas where the fence was set to occupy.

In 2008, property owners in these areas feared a loss of land. Landowners would have had to give some of their land over to the government for the fence. Brownsville mayor Pat Ahumada favored alternative options to a border fence. He suggested that the Rio Grande be widened and deepened to provide for a natural barrier to hinder undocumented immigrants and drug smugglers.

In the wake of the attacks of September 11, 2001, the Border Patrol was placed under the umbrella of the United States Department of Homeland Security, and preventing terrorists and terrorist weapons from entering the United States was added to its mission. The Border Patrol's traditional mission continued: deterring, detecting and apprehending undocumented immigrants and individuals involved in the illegal drug trade who generally entered the United States at places other than through designated ports of entry. The Border Patrol also erected 33 permanent interior checkpoints near the southern border of the United States.

For fiscal year 2019, the nationwide total of Border Patrol agents was 19,648, with 16,731 patrolling the southern border. Agents primarily patrol the Mexico–United States border, where they control drug trafficking and illegal immigration.

The majority of Border Patrol agents are minorities. According to 2016 data, Latinos constitute slightly more than 50% of the Border Patrol.

In late 2021, after public criticism, the Border Patrol outfitted agents with body cameras, which it had rejected in 2015 as too expensive, bad for agent morale, and unreliable; it had previously required state and local law enforcement to turn off their body cameras during joint operations with CBP.

In September 2021, while mounted Border Patrol agents in Del Rio, Texas, responded to an influx of refugees from Haiti crossing the Mexico–United States border, a photograph was captured of an agent appearing to use his bridle reins as a whip against a Haitian migrant. U.S. president Joe Biden said, "To see people treated like they did, horses barely running over, people being strapped. It's outrageous. I promise you those people will pay. There will be an investigation underway now, and there will be consequences. There will be consequences." The photographer, when interviewed, said he did not see any whipping. Months later, in November 2021, The Department of Homeland Security's Office of Inspector General (OIG) declined to investigate allegations against the agents on horseback.

By November 2025 during the second Trump administration, at least half of United States Immigration and Customs Enforcement's top leadership had been fired or reassigned, and many were replaced with Border Patrol officials. The Chicago Tribune described the shakeup as part of the second Trump administration's desire to increase deportations at all costs, noting that Border Patrol's methods were less targeted than ICE's and involved stopping random people on the street and demanding to know their birthplace and citizenship status. Border Patrol agents deployed to urban areas throughout the country to assist with deportations, often being accused of using excessive force against protestors and bystanders. The One Big Beautiful Bill Act included significant increases in funding to U.S. Customs and Border Protection, the parent agency of the Border Patrol.

== Strategy ==
=== 1986: Employer sanctions and interior enforcement ===
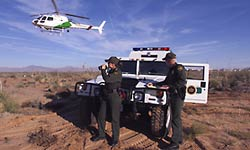
Border Patrol Agents with a Hummer and Astar patrol for illegal entry into the United States

The Border Patrol's priorities have changed over the years. In 1986, the Immigration Reform and Control Act placed renewed emphasis on controlling illegal immigration by going after the employers that hire undocumented immigrants. The belief was that jobs were the magnet that attracted most undocumented immigrants to come to the United States. The Border Patrol increased interior enforcement and Form I-9 audits of businesses through an inspection program known as "employer sanctions". Several agents were assigned to interior stations, such as within the Livermore Sector in Northern California.

Employer sanctions never became the effective tool it was expected to be by Congress. Illegal immigration continued to swell after the 1986 amnesty despite employer sanctions. By 1993, Californians passed Proposition 187, denying benefits to undocumented immigrants and criminalizing undocumented immigrants in possession of forged green cards, identification cards, and Social Security numbers. It also authorized police officers to question non-nationals as to their immigration status and required police and sheriff departments to cooperate and report undocumented immigrants to the INS. Proposition 187 drew nationwide attention to illegal immigration.

==== Checkpoint stations ====
United States Border Patrol Interior Checkpoints are inspection stations operated by the USBP within 100 miles (160 km) of an international border (with Mexico or Canada) or any U.S. coastline.

==== El Paso Sector's Operation Hold the Line ====
El Paso Sector chief patrol agent Silvestre Reyes started a program called "Operation Hold the Line". In this program, Border Patrol agents would no longer react to illegal entries resulting in apprehensions, but would instead be forward deployed to the border, immediately detecting any attempted entries or deterring crossing at a more remote location. The idea was that it would be easier to capture illegal entrants in the wide open deserts than through the urban alleyways. Chief Reyes deployed his agents along the Rio Grande, within eyesight of other agents. The program significantly reduced illegal entries in the urban part of El Paso by shifting them to other areas.

==== San Diego sector's Operation Gatekeeper ====
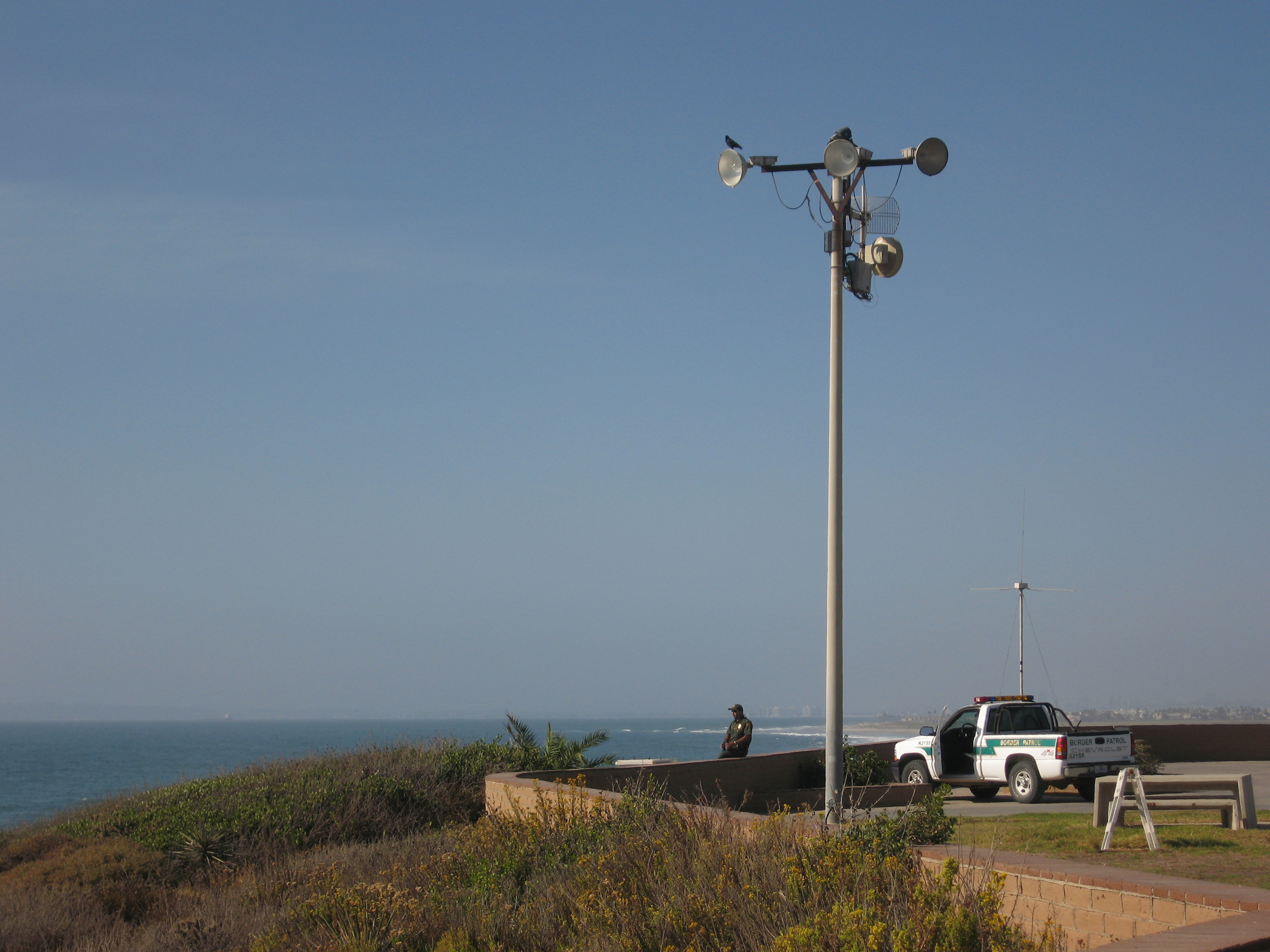
Patrolling the beach in San Diego County, California

Congressman Duncan Hunter became a major proponent of additional border fencing in the San Diego sector; surplus military landing mats were obtained to use as an initial border fence. Stadium lighting, ground sensors and infra-red cameras were also placed in the area. Eventually the primitive landing mat fence was replaced with a modern triple fence line that begins over one hundred yards into the Pacific Ocean at Imperial Beach, California, and ends more than 13 miles (19 km) inland on Otay Mesa where the mountains begin.

==== Northern border ====
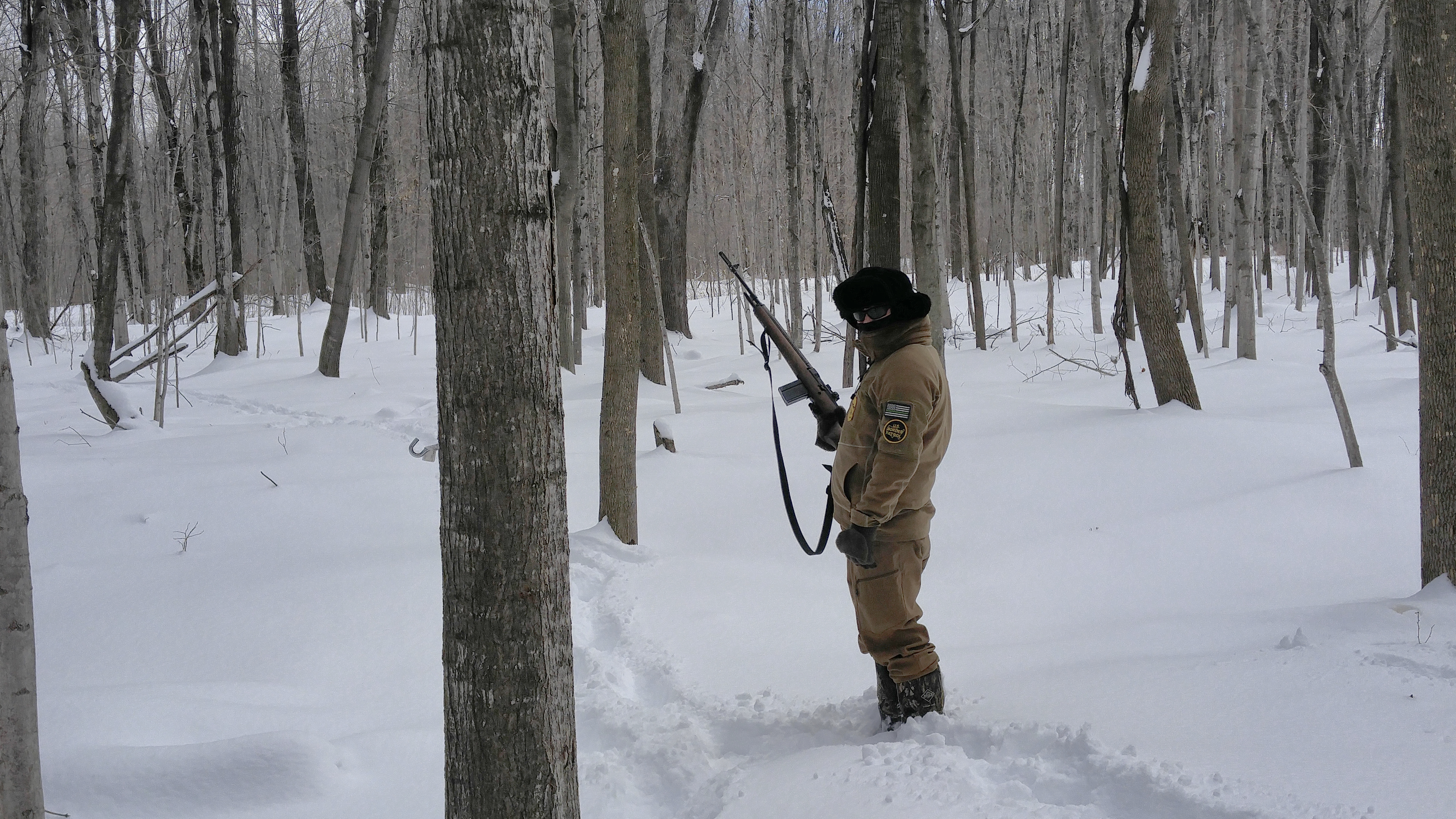
An agent armed with an M14 rifle tracking someone in harsh winter conditions on the northern border

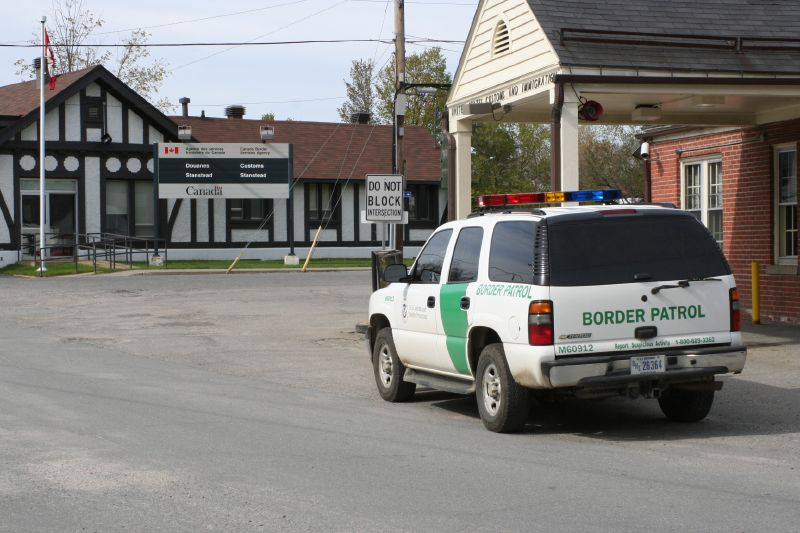
Border crossing to Canada at Beebe Plain, Vermont

Through agency whistleblowers, Agent Mark Hall and Agent Robert Lindemann, it was revealed that in 2001, the Border Patrol had approximately 324 agents assigned along the Canada–United States border. Northern border staffing had been increased by 1,128 agents to 1,470 agents by the end of fiscal year 2008, and is projected to expand to 1,845 by the end of fiscal year 2009, a six-fold increase. Resources that support Border Patrol agents include the use of new technology and a more focused application of air and marine assets.

The northern border sectors are (west to east): Blaine (Washington), Spokane (Washington), Havre (Montana), Grand Forks (North Dakota), Detroit (Selfridge ANGB, Michigan), Buffalo (New York), Swanton (Vermont), and Houlton (Maine).

=== New strategy ===
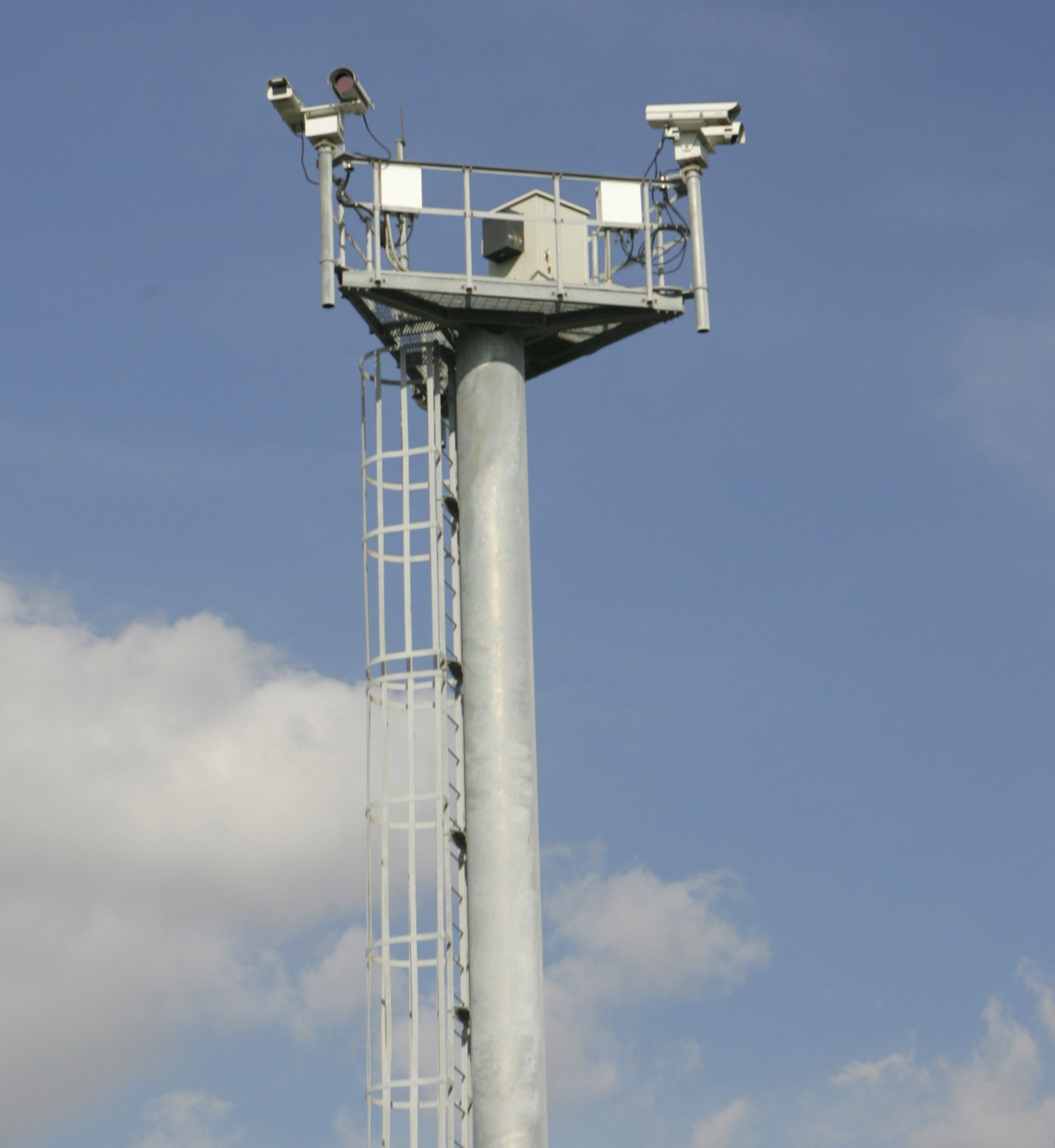
Cameras add "Smart Border" surveillance.

In November 2005, the U.S. Border Patrol published an updated national strategy. The goal of this updated strategy was operational control of the United States border. The strategy has five main objectives:

- Apprehend terrorists and terrorist weapons illegally entering the United States
- Deter illegal entries through improved enforcement
- Detect, apprehend, and deter smugglers of humans, drugs, and other contraband
- Use "smart border" technology
- Reduce crime in border communities, improving quality of life.

== Capabilities ==
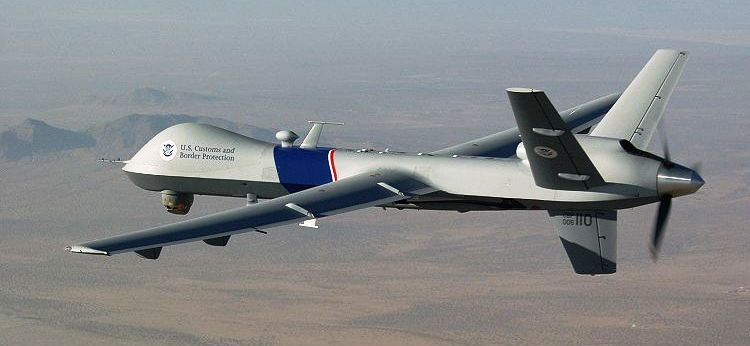
MQ-9 Predator B UAS operated by United States Customs and Border Protection

Border Patrol all-terrain vehicles

The United States border is a barely discernible line in the uninhabited deserts, canyons, or mountains and rivers. The Border Patrol utilizes a variety of equipment and methods, such as electronic sensors placed at strategic locations along the border, to detect people or vehicles entering the country illegally. Video monitors and night vision scopes are also used to detect illegal entries. Agents patrol the border in vehicles, boats, aircraft, and afoot. In some areas, the Border Patrol employs horses, all-terrain motorcycles, bicycles, and snowmobiles. Air surveillance capabilities are provided by unmanned aerial vehicles.

The primary activity of a Border Patrol agent is "line watch". Line watch involves the detection, prevention, and apprehension of terrorists, undocumented immigrants and smugglers of aliens at or near the land border by maintaining surveillance from a covert position; following up on leads; responding to electronic sensor, television systems and aircraft sightings; and interpreting and following tracks, marks, and other physical evidence. Major activities include traffic check, traffic observation, city patrol, transportation check, administrative, intelligence, and anti-smuggling activities.

Traffic checks are conducted on major highways leading away from the border to detect and apprehend undocumented immigrants attempting to travel further into the interior of the United States after evading detection at the border, and to detect illegal narcotics.

Transportation checks are inspections of interior-bound conveyances, which include buses, commercial aircraft, passenger and freight trains, and marine craft.

Marine patrols are conducted along the coastal waterways of the United States, primarily along the Pacific coast, the Caribbean, the tip of Florida, and Puerto Rico and interior waterways common to the United States and Canada. The Border Patrol conducts patrol activities from 130 marine craft of various sizes. The Border Patrol maintains watercraft ranging from blue-water craft to inflatable-hull craft, in 16 sectors, in addition to headquarters and special operations components. The Border Patrol Marine Position was created in 2009 (BPA-M).

Horse and bike patrols are used to augment regular vehicle and foot patrols. Horse units patrol remote areas along the international boundary that are inaccessible to standard all-terrain vehicles. Bike patrol aids city patrol and is used over rough terrain to support line watch. Snowmobiles are used to patrol remote areas along the northern border in the winter.

== Other specialized programs ==
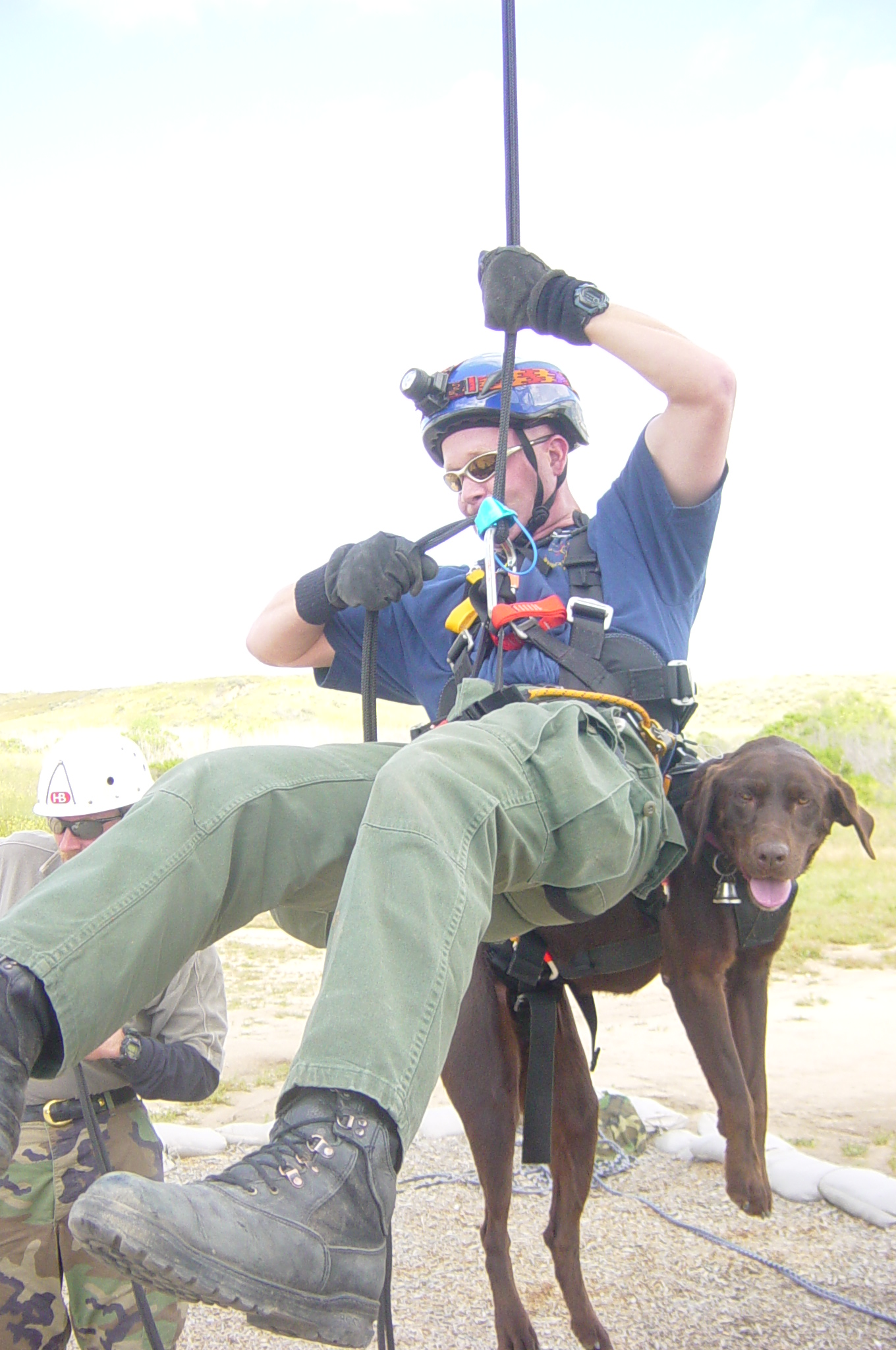
BORSTAR canine team conducting rappeling training

In 2007, the U.S. Border Patrol created the special operations group (SOG) headquartered in El Paso, Texas, to coordinate the special operations units of the agency.

The U.S. Border Patrol has a number of other specialized programs and details. Marine patrol – in the riverine environments of the northern and southwestern borders of the continental United States, the Border Patrol conducts border control activities from the decks of marine craft of various sizes. Since 2006, the U.S. Border Patrol has relinquished its littoral law enforcement missions in the Great Lakes and territorial seas to the Office of Air and Marine. The U.S. Border Patrol maintains over 130 vessels, ranging from blue-water craft to inflatable-hull craft, in 16 sectors, in addition to headquarters special operations components.

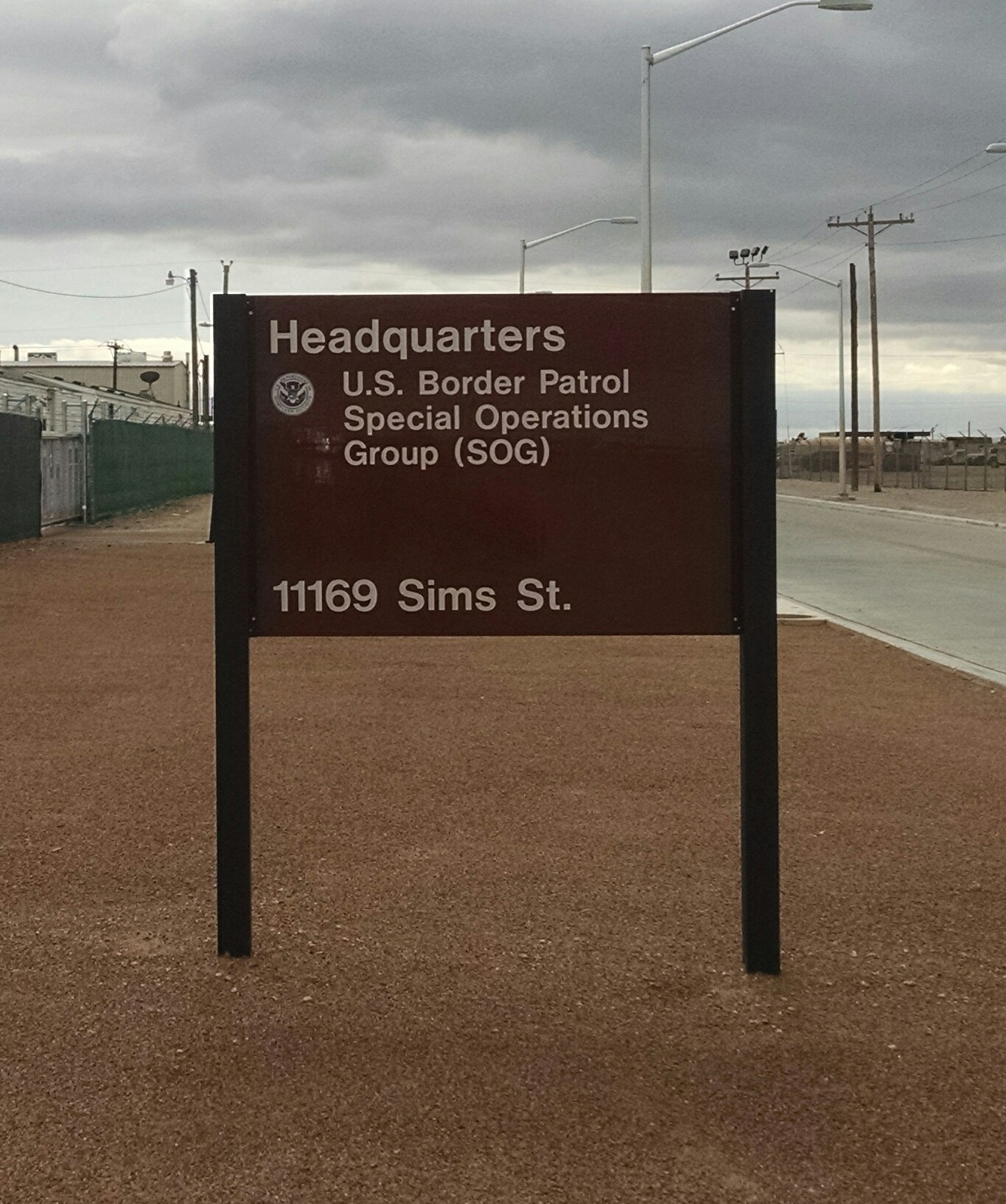
Sign for U.S. Border Patrol Special Operations Group on Biggs Army Airfield, Fort Bliss, El Paso, Texas

There are also K9 units, mounted patrols, bike patrols, sign-cutting (tracking), snowmobile units, infrared-scope units, intelligence, anti-smuggling investigations unit (ASU/DISRUPT, Border Criminal Alien Program, multi-agency anti-gang task forces (regional and local units), honor guards, pipes and drums, chaplains, peer support, and mobile surveillance units.

== Deterrence ==
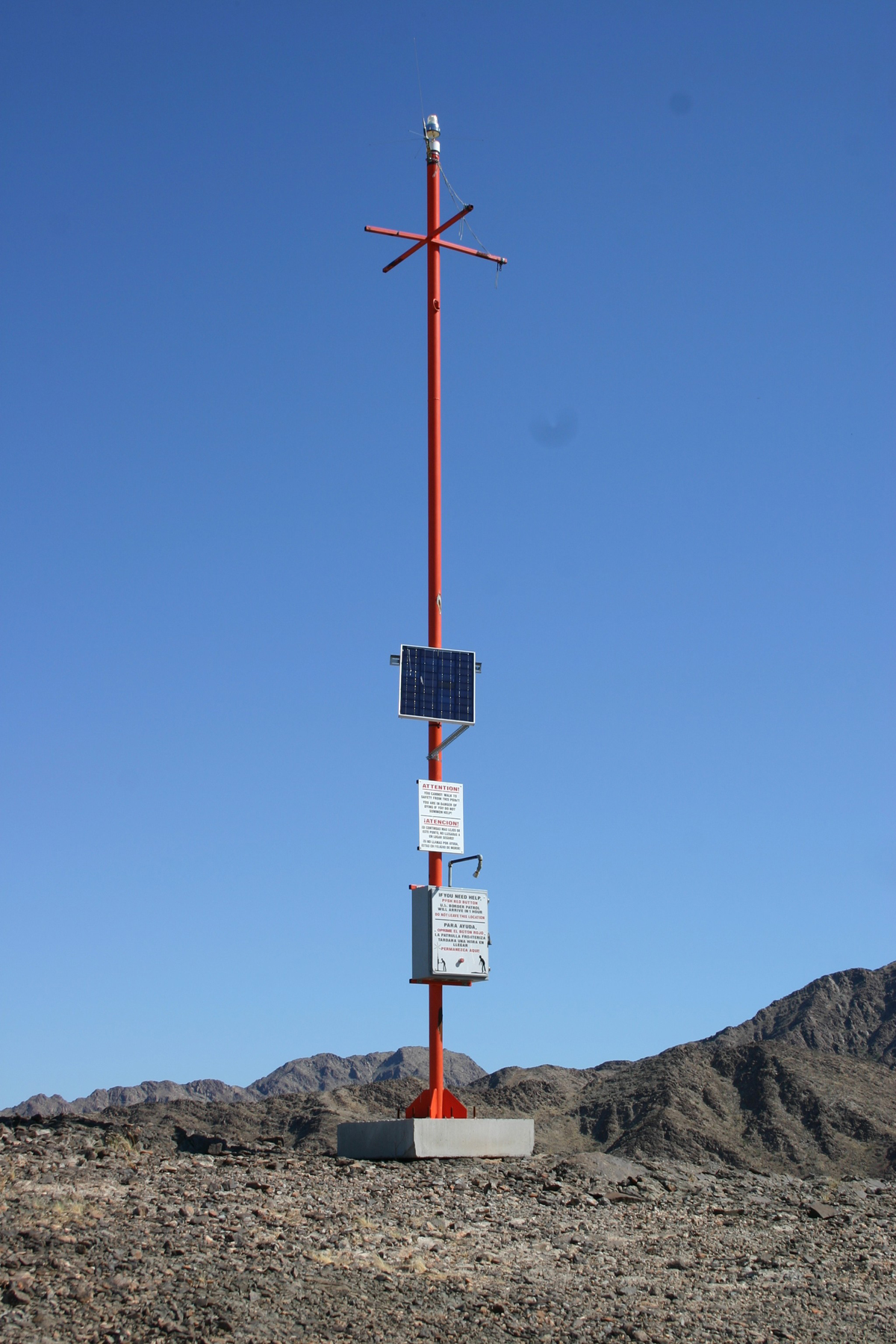
This rescue beacon states in English and Spanish: "Attention: You cannot walk to safety from this point! You are in danger of dying if you do not summon help! If you need help, push red button, U.S. Border Patrol will arrive in one hour, do not leave this location"

"Operation Gatekeeper" was launched in 1994 to stop immigrants from crossing illegally into the United States. The strategy included increased enforcement and extensive fencing near border cities, with the two-fold purpose of deflecting aliens to remote areas where they could more easily be detected and apprehended, as well as using mountains, deserts, and Rio Grande as a deterrent to easy passage. The newly erected Mexico–United States barrier—which at some remote locations is no more than a fence—has also forced aliens and human traffickers to seek out remote desert locations in California, Arizona, New Mexico and Texas where they may attempt crossing. The "funnel effect" created by both these strategies has contributed to the deaths of thousands of aliens, whose remains are often found in the hot desert or freezing mountains.

As early as 1998, the former Immigration and Naturalization Service implemented the Border Safety Initiative in response to concerns about the number of aliens injured or killed while attempting to cross the border. It was noted that Border Patrol agents routinely supplied water, food, and medical care to aliens. That same year, Border Patrol, Search, Trauma and Rescue (BORSTAR), a specialized unit trained in emergency search and rescue, was established with the purpose of assisting injured or stranded aliens at remote locations.

In 2002, the first "rescue beacons" were installed in desert areas considered especially dangerous. The beacons are solar powered and highly visible, and have a button which alerts Border Patrol agents by radio signal, after which a helicopter or ground unit is dispatched. U.S. Senator Bill Frist commented in 2006: "these beacons, I believe, are an absolutely vital link in our border security system... We know that beacons work: CBP has already saved dozens of people based entirely on beacon alerts." The Border Patrol frequently publishes reports about stranded and injured individuals rescued at beacon locations.

In fiscal year 2020, Border Patrol agents and Air and Marine Operations agents are credited with saving more than 5,000 people and conducted approximately 1,400 search and rescue operations.

== Sectors ==
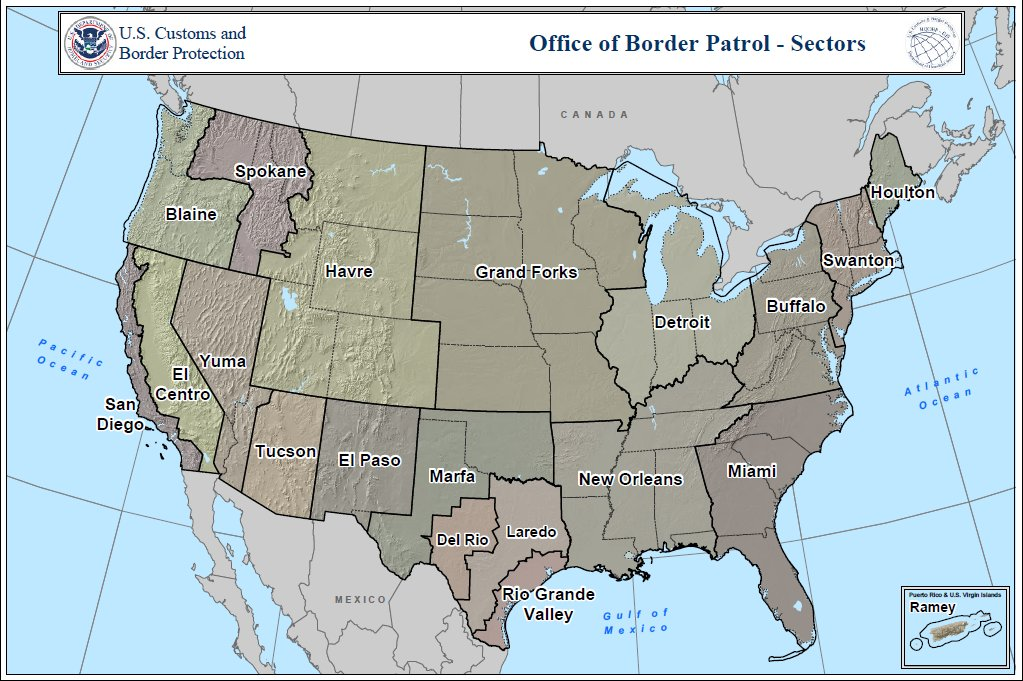
A map of Border Patrol sectors

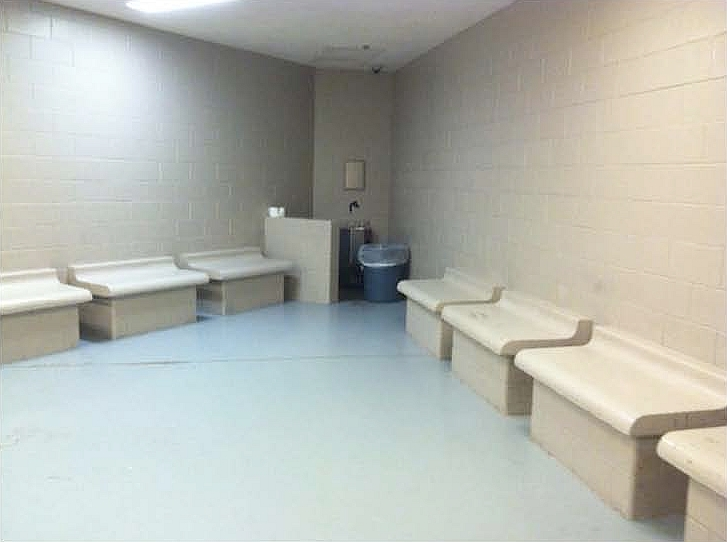
Holding room at Fort Brown Station, Brownsville, Texas

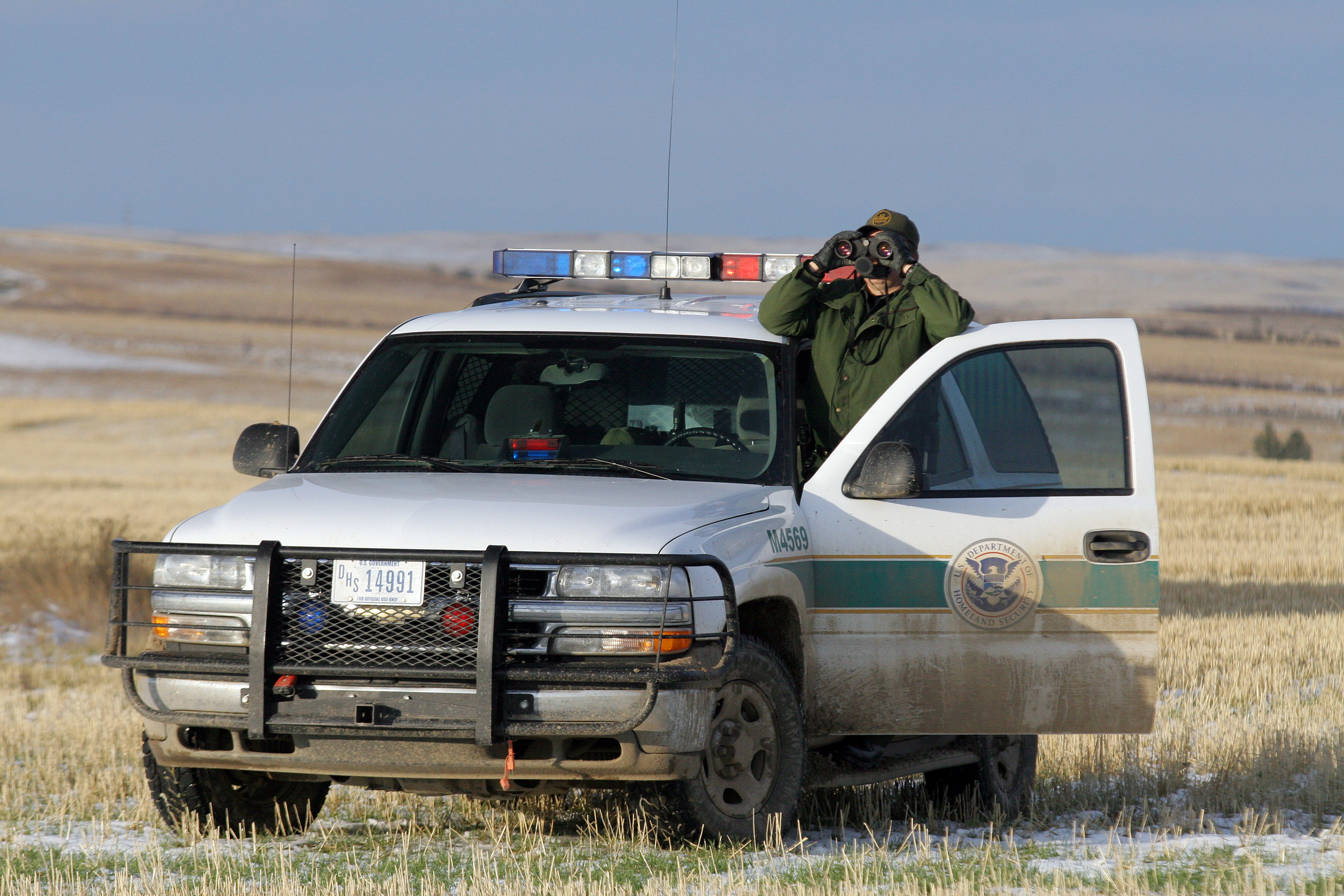
Border Patrol in Montana

There are 20 Border Patrol sectors, each headed by a sector chief patrol agent. Each sector oversees a number of smaller nearby stations.

=== Canadian border ===
Sector headquarters	Stations
Blaine, Washington	Sumas, Blaine, Port Angeles, Bellingham
Spokane, Washington	Bonners Ferry, Colville, Curlew, Eureka, Metaline Falls, Oroville, Whitefish
Havre, Montana	St. Mary, Havre, Plentywood, Scobey, Malta, Sweetgrass
Grand Forks, North Dakota	Pembina, International Falls, Portal, Bottineau, Warroad, Grand Marais, Duluth
Detroit, Michigan	Sandusky Bay, Sault Sainte Marie, Marysville, Gibraltar, Detroit
Buffalo, New York	Erie, Oswego, Rochester, Wellesley Island, Buffalo, Niagara Falls
Swanton, Vermont	Beecher Falls, Massena, Ogdensburg, Champlain, Burke, Newport, Richford, Swanton
Houlton, Maine	Van Buren, Jackman, Fort Fairfield, Houlton, Rangeley, Calais

=== Mexican border ===
Sector headquarters	Stations
San Diego, California	Imperial Beach, Brown Field, Campo, San Clemente, El Cajon, Murrieta, Chula Vista, Boulevard
El Centro, California	El Centro, Calexico, Indio
Yuma, Arizona	Blythe, Yuma, Wellton
Tucson, Arizona	Nogales, Ajo, Tucson, Brian A. Terry, Sonoita, Douglas, Willcox, Casa Grande, Three Points
El Paso, Texas	Las Cruces, Fort Hancock, Ysleta, Truth or Consequences, Alamogordo, Deming, Santa Teresa, El Paso, Lordsburg, Clint
Big Bend, Texas	Presidio, Van Horn, Alpine, Sierra Blanca, Fort Stockton, Marfa, Sanderson
Del Rio, Texas	San Angelo, Del Rio, Brackettville, Comstock, Abilene, Eagle Pass, Eagle Pass South, Rocksprings, Carrizo Springs, Uvalde
Laredo, Texas	Laredo South, Dallas, Cotulla, Zapata, Laredo West, Freer, Laredo North, San Antonio
Rio Grande Valley, Texas	Rio Grande City, Harlingen, Fort Brown, McAllen, Brownsville, Falfurrias, Corpus Christi, Weslaco, Kingsville

=== Maritime borders ===
Sector headquarters	Stations
New Orleans, Louisiana	New Orleans, Gulfport, Lake Charles, Mobile, Baton Rouge
Miami, Florida	Tampa, Marathon, West Palm Beach, Jacksonville, Dania Beach, Orlando
Aguadilla, Puerto Rico	Ramey Air Force Base

== Appearance ==
=== Uniforms ===
The Border Patrol uniform got its first makeover since the 1950s to appear more like military fatigues and less like a police officer's duty garb. Leather belts with brass buckles have been replaced by nylon belts with quick-release plastic buckles, slacks have been replaced by lightweight cargo pants, and shiny badges and nameplates have been replaced by cloth patches.

=== Ranks and insignia ===
Location	Title	Collar insignia	Shoulder ornament	Pay grade
Border Patrol Headquarters	Chief of the Border Patrol		Gold-plated	Senior Executive Service (SES)
	Deputy Chief of the Border Patrol		Gold-plated	SES
	Division Chief		Gold-plated	SES
	Deputy Division Chief		Gold-plated	GS-15, General Schedule
	Associate Chief		Gold-plated	GS-15
	Assistant Chief		Gold-plated	GS-14
	Operations Officer (OPO)		Gold-plated	GS-13
	Border Patrol Agent (Headquarters Programs)		Silver-plated	GS-13
Border Patrol sectors	Chief Patrol Agent (CPA)		Silver-plated	SES or GS-15
	Deputy Chief Patrol Agent (DCPA)		Silver-plated	SES or GS-15
	Division Chief/ACTT Director		Silver-plated	GS-15
	Executive Officer/Assistant Chief Patrol Agent (ACPA)		Silver-plated	GS-14
	Special Operations Supervisor (SOS)		Silver-plated	GS-13
	Operations Officer (OPO)		Silver-plated	GS-13
	Supervisory Border Patrol Agent (SBPA)		Silver-plated	GS-13
	Border Patrol Agent (Sector Programs)		No insignia	GS-13
	Border Patrol Agent – Intelligence (BPA-I)		No insignia	GS-12
Border Patrol stations	Patrol Agent In Charge (PAIC)		Oxidized	GS-13, 14, 15
	Deputy Patrol Agent In Charge (DPAIC)		Oxidized	GS-14 or GS-13
	Watch Commander (WC)		Oxidized	GS-14 or GS-13
	Special Operations Supervisor (SOS)		Oxidized	GS-13
	Supervisory Border Patrol Agent (SBPA)		Oxidized	GS-13
	Border Patrol Agent – Intelligence (BPA-I)		No insignia	GS-12
	Border Patrol Agent (BPA)		No insignia	GL-5, 7, 9, GS-11, 12
Border Patrol Academy	Chief Patrol Agent (CPA)		Silver-plated	GS-15
	Deputy Chief Patrol Agent (DCPA)		Silver-plated	GS-15
	Assistant Chief Patrol Agent (ACPA)		Silver-plated	GS-14
	Training Operations Supervisor (TOS)		Silver-plated	GS-14
	Special Operations Supervisor (SOS)		Silver-plated	GS-13
	Supervisory Border Patrol Agent (instructor)		Oxidized	GS-13
	Border Patrol Agent (detailed instructor)		Oxidized	GS-11, 12

==== Shoulder ornaments ====
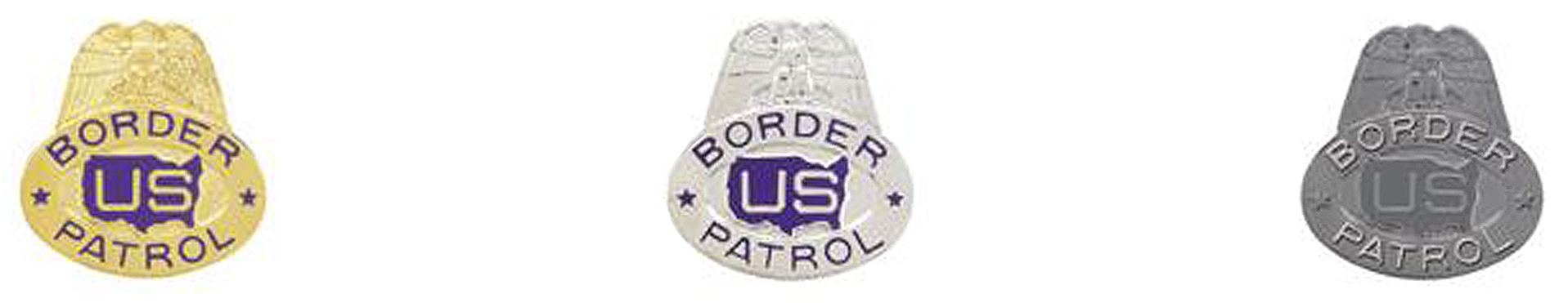

== Awards ==
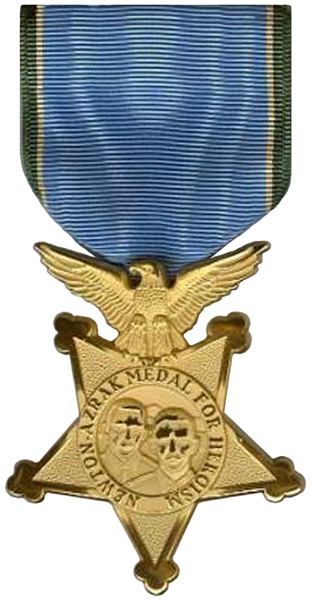
Newton-Azrak Award for Heroism

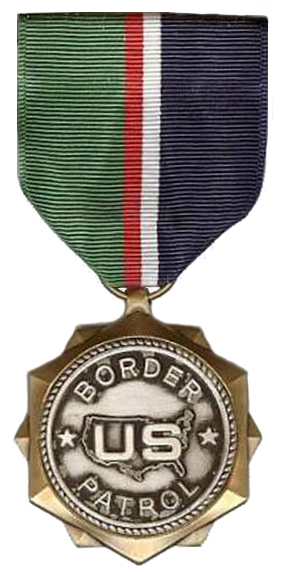
Chiefs Commendation Medal

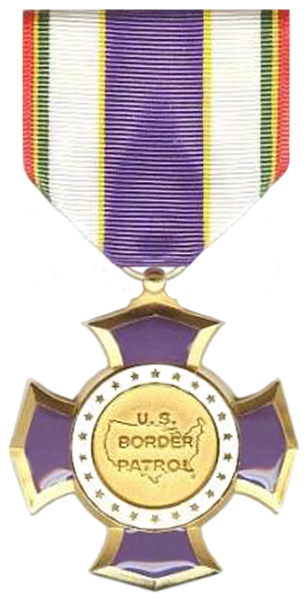
Purple Cross Wound Medal

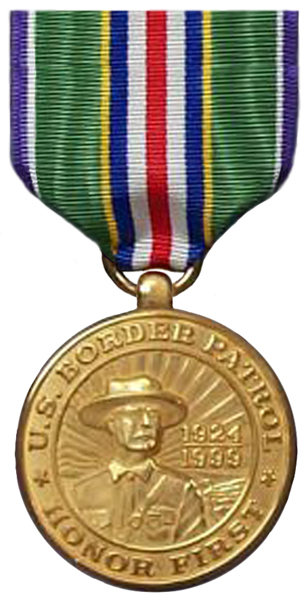
75th Anniversary Commemorative Medal

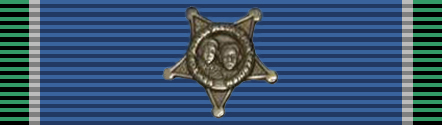
Current heroism award

Current Award

Current wound award

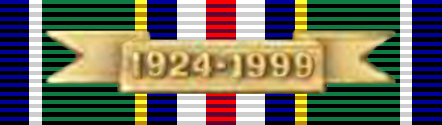
No longer worn

=== Newton-Azrak Award for Heroism ===
The Border Patrol's highest honor is the Newton-Azrak Award for Heroism. This award is bestowed to Border Patrol agents for extraordinary actions, service; accomplishments reflecting unusual courage or bravery in the line of duty; or an extraordinarily heroic or humane act committed during times of extreme stress or in an emergency.

This award is named for Border Patrol inspectors Theodore Newton and George Azrak, who were murdered by two drug smugglers in San Diego County in 1967.

== Uniform devices ==
Tactical unit
(BORTAC)
Search and rescue unit

(BORSTAR)

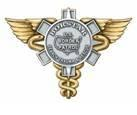
Honor guard
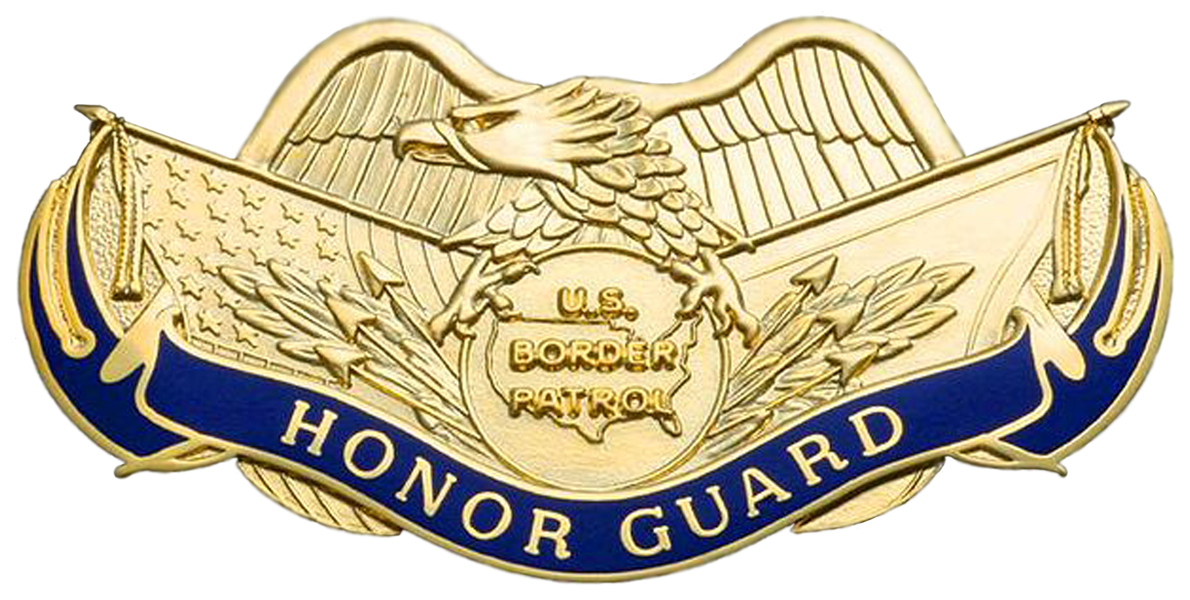
Pipes and drums
cap badge
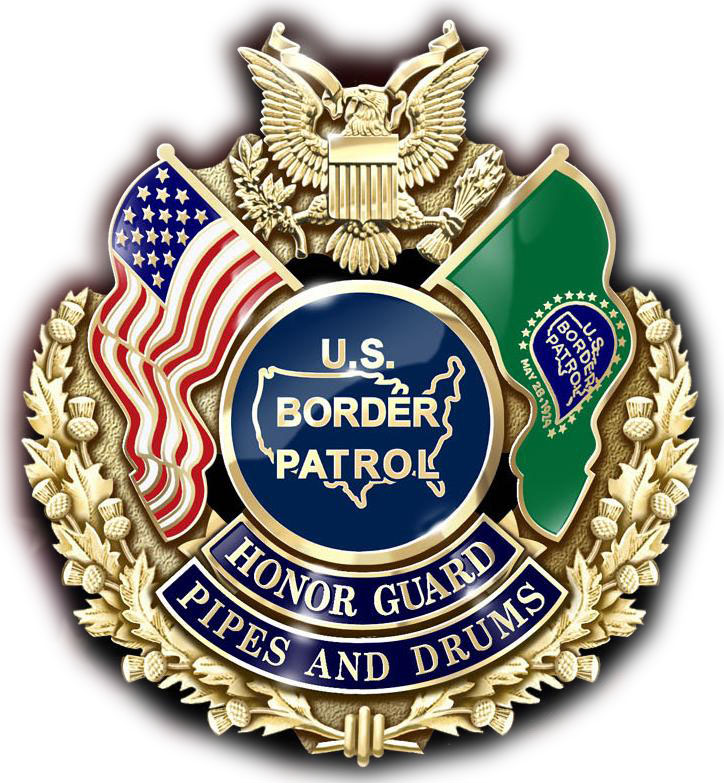
K-9 handler
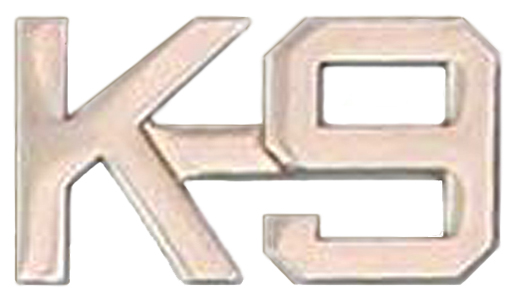
Chaplain
Field training officer
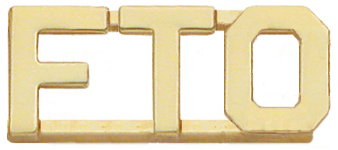
Peer support
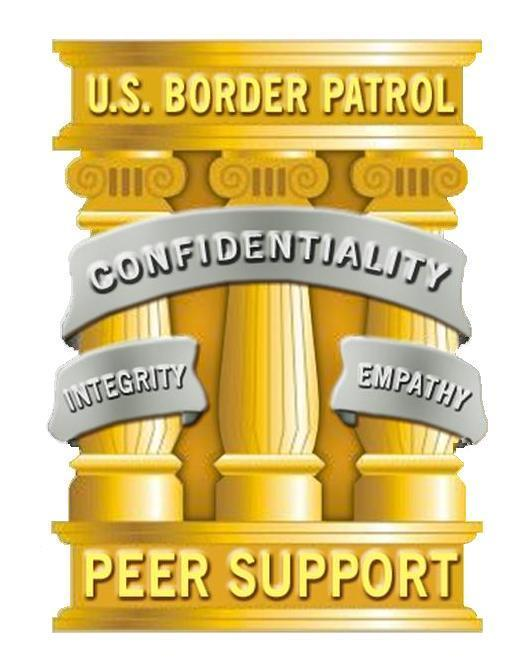

== Equipment ==
=== Weapons ===
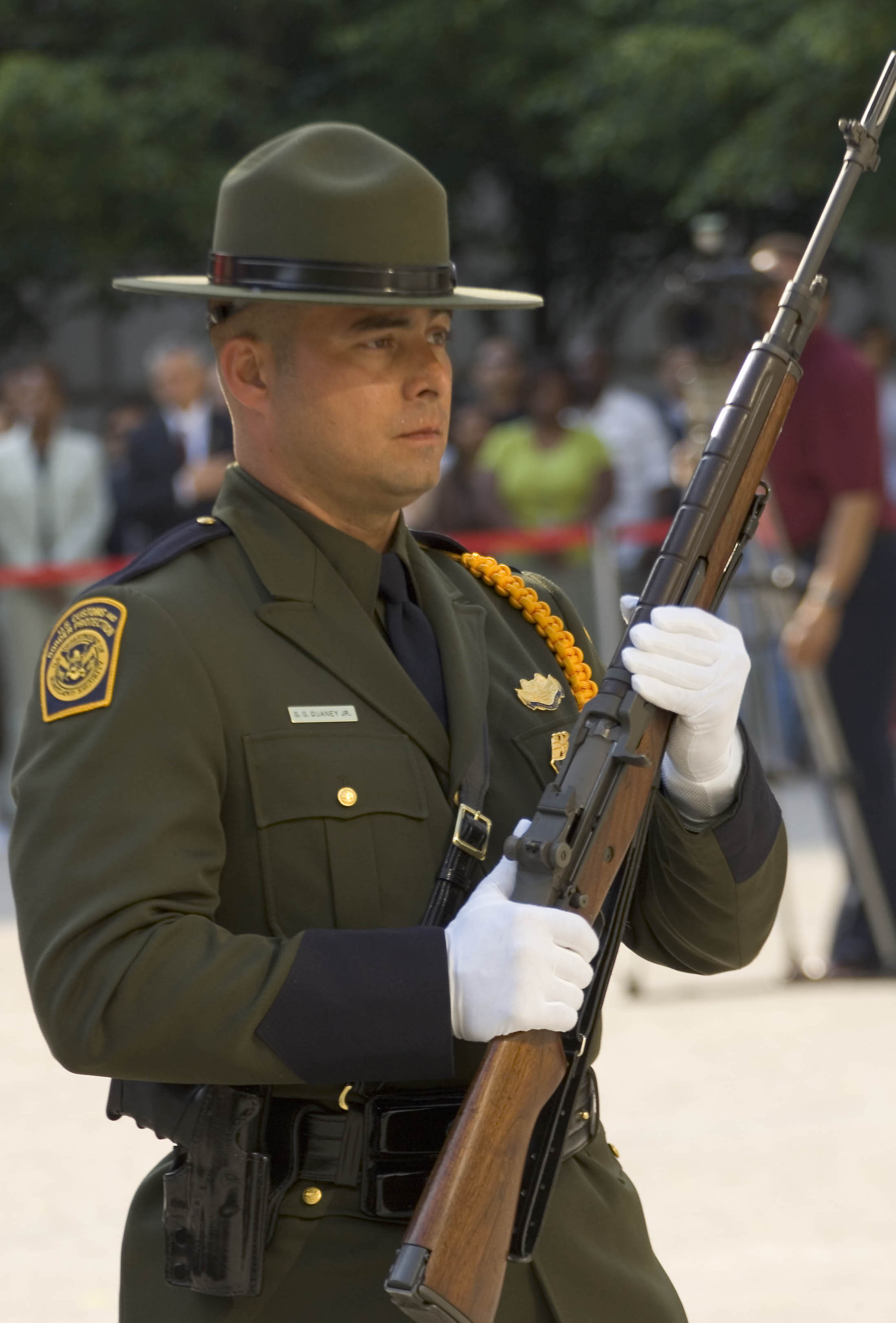
A Border Patrol Honor Guard Agent carrying an M14 rifle

Border Patrol agents have a choice of being issued either the Glock 47 or the Glock 19M pistol in 9mm caliber. The Glock 47 can contain as many as 18 rounds of ammunition (17 in the magazine and 1 in the chamber), while the Glock 19 can contain as many as 16 rounds. Up until 1995 the Border Patrol issued its patrol agents .357 Magnum revolvers as their duty sidearms, Smith & Wesson or Ruger model large frame, six-shot revolvers. The Border Patrol preferred this weapon because it did not jam in harsh conditions, like those of the southwestern border, and also because of the strong "stopping power" of the .357 Magnum cartridge. Although up until 1995 patrol agents could purchase weapons from the agency list of approved authorized personal weapons for duty carry. This list included the Glock Models 17 and 19 pistols in 9 mm, the SIG Sauer P220 pistol in .45 ACP caliber, the Colt Python .357 Magnum revolver, and the Smith & Wesson Model 19/66 .357 Magnum revolver. The Border Patrol adopted the Beretta Model 96D, a .40 S&W caliber semi-automatic pistol (modified for double-action only) (with 11-round capacity magazines) as its duty issue sidearm in 1995. The .40 S&W caliber jacketed hollow-point cartridge was adopted because of its excellent "stopping power" and its superior ballistic characteristics over the 9 mm cartridge. In late 2006 the H&K P2000 pistol was adopted as the Border Patrol's primary duty sidearm. The H&K Model USP compact pistol, H&K Model P2000SK (sub-compact) and Beretta M96D .40 S&W caliber pistols are authorized as secondary sidearms.

On April 9, 2019, CBP announced that the U.S. Border Patrol would transition from the .40 caliber H&K P2000 to an unnamed 9-millimeter Glock pistol, by the end of fiscal year 2021. It has since been revealed that the three Glock handguns that are to be issued to CBP officers and agents are the model G26, model G19, and the specifically manufactured for CBP model G47.

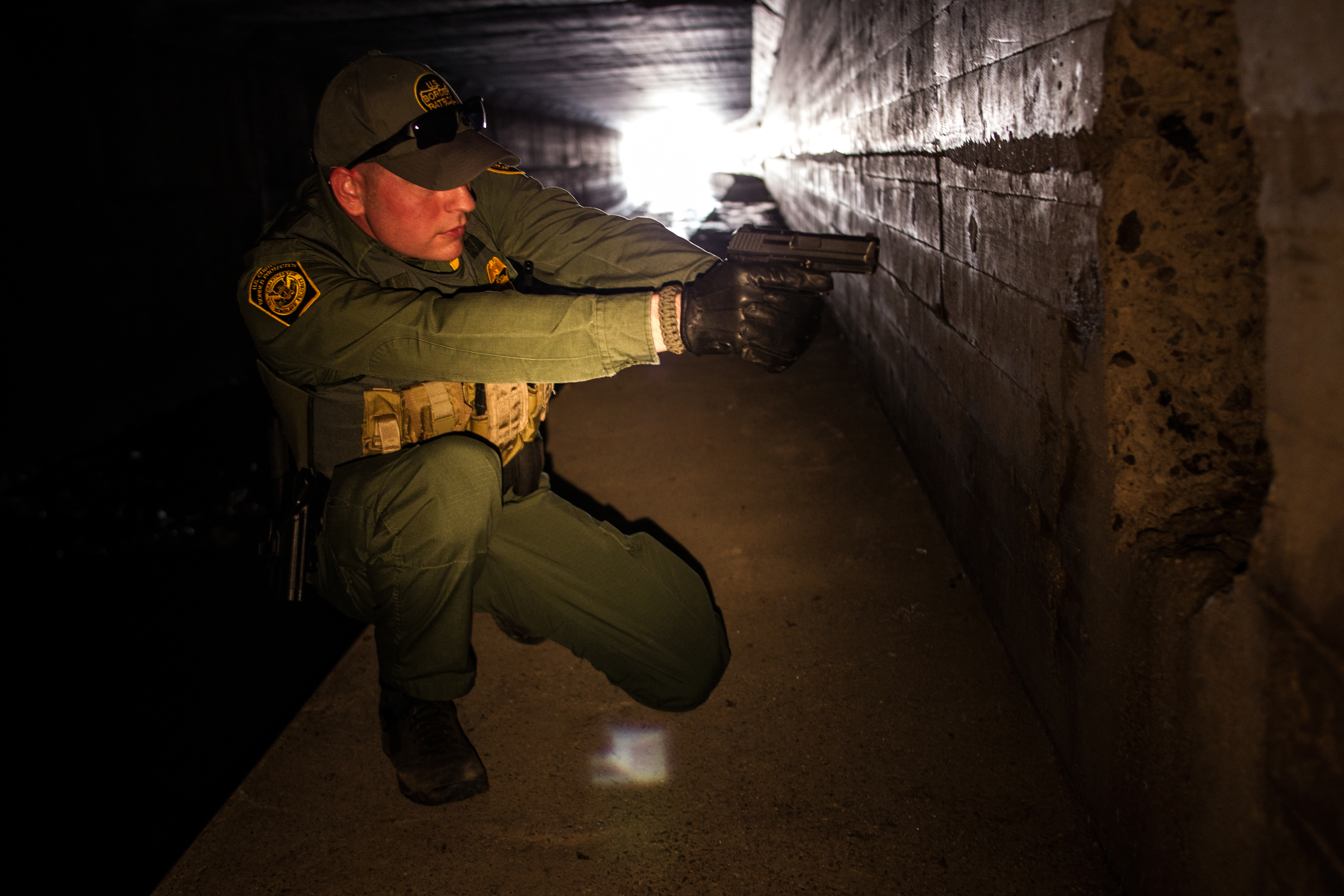
Patrolling a tunnel in Nogales, Arizona

Like many other law enforcement agencies, the 12 gauge Remington Model 870 is the standard pump-action shotgun. The Border Patrol issue Model 870 has been modified by Scattergun Technologies to Border Patrol specifications including: a 14-inch barrel, a five-shot capacity magazine, a composite stock with pistol grip, and night sights with a tactical "ghost-ring" rear sight. The old Border Patrol "anti-bandit" units used to use 12-gauge, semi-automatic shotguns with sawed-off barrels. This weapon had the designated name of a "Sidewinder". The USBP anti-bandit units were decommissioned in the late 1980s.

Border Patrol agents also commonly carry the Colt M4 Carbine (specifically, the updated M4A1) using agency-issued 64-grain, .223 caliber ammunition and the H&K UMP .40 caliber submachine gun. The .308 caliber M14 rifle is used for ceremonial purposes and by agents who are qualified with the rifle and BORTAC.

As a less than lethal option, the Border Patrol uses the FN 303 launcher. The FN 303 fires 40mm plastic pellet balls containing OC (oleoresin capsicum) pepper dust. The plastic pellet balls burst on impact spraying the suspect with OC pepper dust and also acts as impact projectiles. The Border Patrol also issues its agents OC pepper spray canisters, tasers and a collapsible/telescopic (or telescoping) steel police baton.

=== Transportation ===
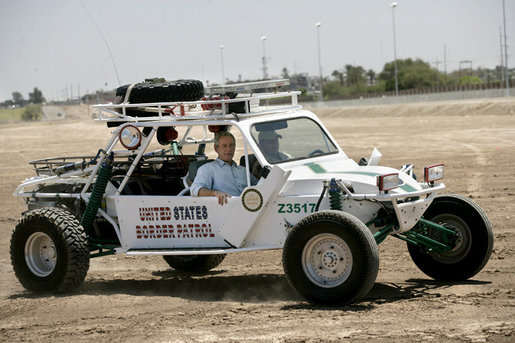
Former US President George W. Bush riding in a U.S. Border Patrol sand rail in Yuma, Arizona, in 2006

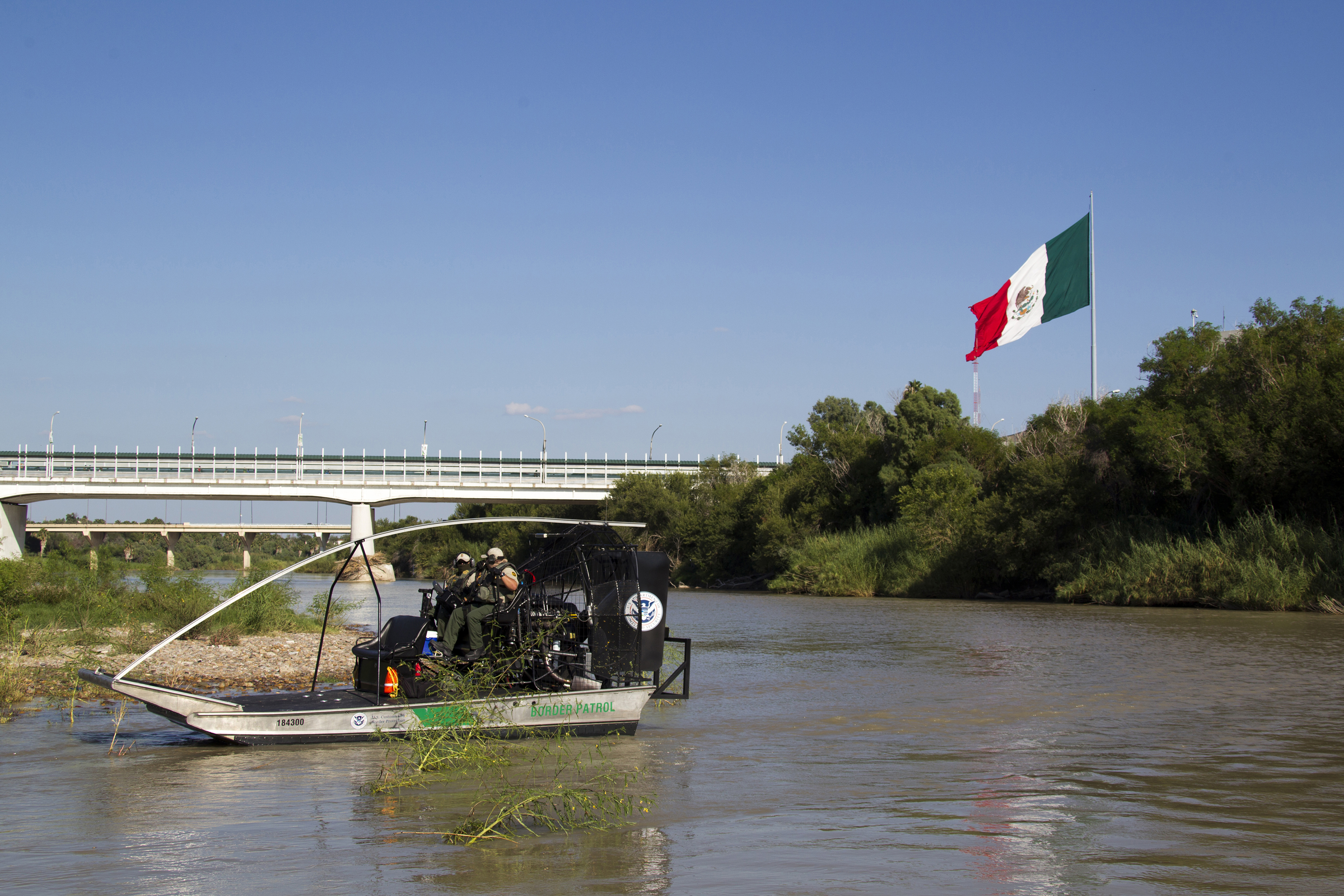
Patrolling the Rio Grande in an airboat at Laredo, Texas, 2013

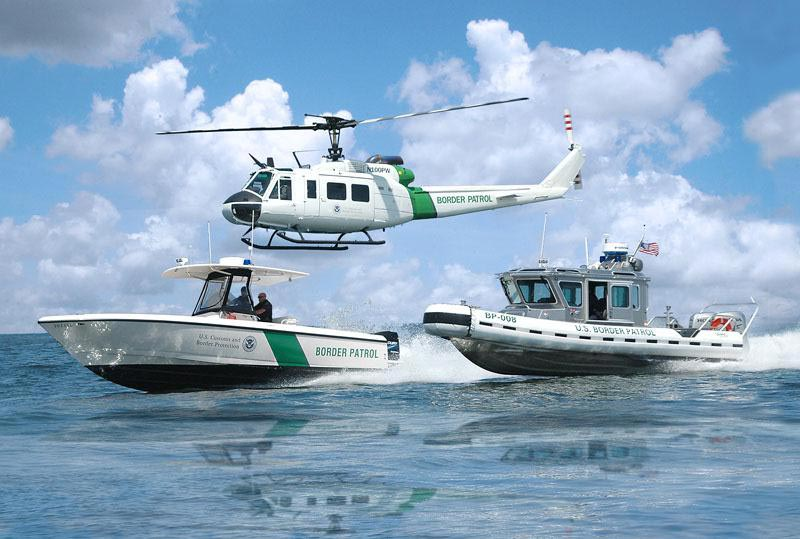
Helicopter and boats

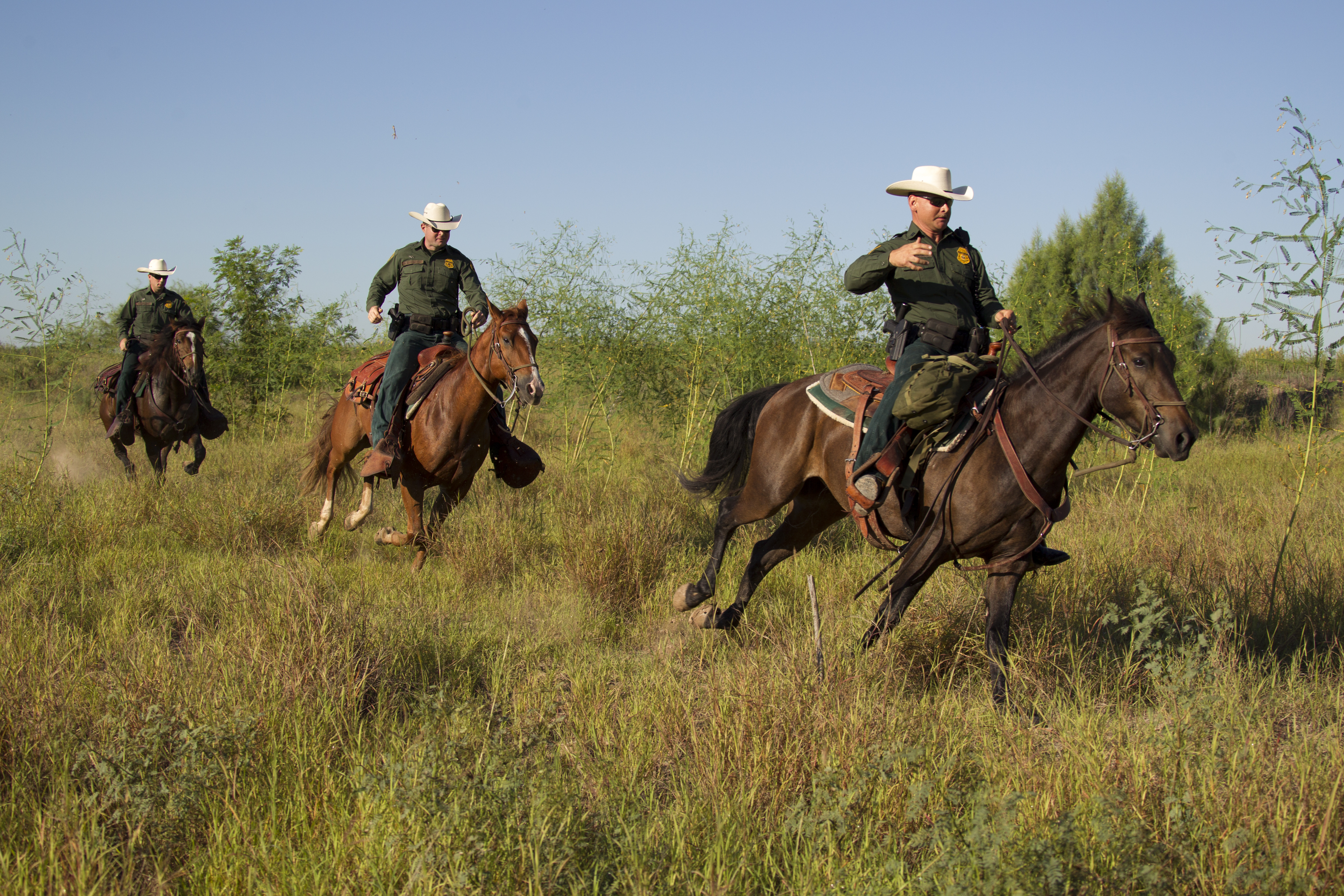
A USBP horse patrol in southern Texas

Unlike in many other law enforcement agencies in the United States, the Border Patrol operates over 10,000 SUVs and pickup trucks, which are known for their capabilities to move around in any sort of terrain. These vehicles may have individual revolving lights (strobes or LEDs) and/or light bars and sirens and/or have their bumpers removed or have off-road suspension and tires. An extensive modernization drive has ensured that these vehicles are equipped with wireless sets in communication with a central control room. Border Patrol vehicles may also have equipment such as emergency first aid kits. Some sectors make use of sedans like the Ford Crown Victoria Police Interceptor or the Dodge Charger as patrol cars or high speed "interceptors" on highways. The U.S. Border Patrol has approximately 2,000 sedans. The Border Patrol also operates all-terrain vehicles, motorcycles, snowmobiles, and small boats in riverine environments.

In 2005, all Border Patrol and ICE aircraft operations were combined under CBP's Office of Air and Marine. All CBP vessel operations within the Customs Waters and on the high seas are conducted by Marine Interdiction Agents of the Office of Air and Marine.

Color schemes of Border Patrol vehicles are either a long green stripe running the length of the vehicle (older vehicles) or a broad green diagonal stripe (newer vehicles) on the door. Most Border Patrol vehicles are painted predominantly white. During the 1960s to 1991 Border Patrol vehicles were painted a light green.

The Border Patrol also extensively uses horses for remote area patrols. As of 2005, the U.S. Border Patrol has 205 horses. Most are employed along the Mexico–United States border. In Arizona, these animals are fed special processed feed pellets so that their wastes do not spread non-native plants in the national parks and wildlife areas they patrol.

== Killed in the line of duty ==
Since 1904, the Border Patrol has had 156 inspectors/officers/agents along with 6 K9s killed in the line of duty, more than any other federal law enforcement agency during that time period. Testifying in front of the United States Senate, Border Patrol chief Mark Morgan said that the Border Patrol is one of the most assaulted law enforcement agencies.

Cause of death	Number of agents/inspectors as of January 22, 2024
Accidental	1
Aircraft accident	15
Assault	2
Automobile accident	38
COVID-19	16
Drowned	4
Duty-related illness	4
Fall	4
Gunfire	33
Gunfire (inadvertent)	5
Heart attack	9
Heatstroke	2
Motorcycle crash	3
Stabbed	3
Struck by train	5
Struck by vehicle	6
Vehicle pursuit	2
Vehicular assault	4

== Criticisms ==
=== Payouts to settle claims of mistreatment ===
Official data released under the Freedom of Information Act shows that between 2005 and 2017, the federal government paid out more than $60,000,000 in legal settlements of cases in which border agents were involved in deaths, driving injuries, alleged assaults, and wrongful detention. For example, in the 2003 case of Ricardo Olivares, the agent who fired the shot who killed him was not prosecuted, by decision of the U.S. Department of Justice, but a civil suit filed by the man's family resulted in an award of $350,000.

=== Ramos and Compean ===
In February 2005, Border Patrol agents Ignacio Ramos and Jose Compean were involved in an incident while pursuing a van in Fabens, Texas. The driver, later identified as Aldrete Davila, was shot by Agent Ramos during a scuffle. Davila escaped back into Mexico, and the agents discovered that the van contained a million dollars' worth of marijuana (about 750 pounds). None of the agents at the scene orally reported the shooting, including two supervisors: Robert Arnold, first-line supervisor and Jonathan Richards, a higher ranking field operations supervisor. Ramos and Compean were charged with multiple crimes. Ramos was convicted of causing serious bodily injury, assault with a deadly weapon, discharge of a firearm in relation to a crime of violence, and a civil rights violation. Compeán was found guilty on 11 counts, including discharging a firearm during the commission of a violent crime, which by itself carries a federally mandated 10-year minimum sentence. Without that charge, both agents involved would have received far shorter sentences. Ramos was sentenced to 11 years and a day in prison and Compean to 12 years. Jonathan Richards was promoted to the Patrol Agent in Charge of the Santa Teresa, New Mexico Border Patrol Station soon after the incident. On January 19, 2009, President Bush commuted the sentences of both Ramos and Compean, effectively ending their prison term on March 20, 2009, and they were released on February 17, 2009. The case generated widely differing opinion among various commentators and advocacy groups: civil libertarians asserted the agents used illegal and excessive force, while advocates of tighter border control defended the agents actions.

=== Death of Anastasio Hernández-Rojas ===
On May 30, 2010, Anastasio Hernandez-Rojas died of a heart attack while in the custody of United States Border Patrol (USBP), Immigration and Customs Enforcement (ICE), and U.S. Customs and Border Protection (CBP) and agents and officers at the San Diego–Tijuana border. He was beaten and then shocked by tasers at the San Ysidro Port of Entry, within view of many bystanders with cameras on the busy pedestrian bridge. Although the United States Department of Justice (DOJ) investigation concluded on November 6, 2015, that Hernández-Rojas died of a heart attack, an offer of a million-dollar settlement was made to his family. None of the agents or officers involved were fired or disciplined for excessive use of force. In February 2017, his common-law wife and five children accepted the settlement. Hernández-Rojas's death was profiled in a 2012 PBS report called Crossing the Line, in Nonny de la Peña's 2013 five-minute-long virtual reality called Use of Force, and in a 2014 American Civil Liberties Union report.

=== Death of Sergio Hernandez ===
Sergio Adrian Hernandez was a teenager who was shot once and killed on June 7, 2010, by Border Patrol agents under a bridge crossing between El Paso, Texas, and Ciudad Juárez, Mexico.

Border Patrol agents claimed that there was a mob that pelted them with rocks. For his involvement in the incident, Border Patrol agent Jesus Mesa Jr., invoked qualified immunity in his defense. In February 2020, the U.S. Supreme Court ruled that the Hernandez family may not bring suit against the agent, highlighting the 1971 case Bivens v. Six Unknown Named Agents in the majority opinion.

On June 10, Mexican president Felipe Calderón called on the United States to launch a "thorough, impartial" probe into the deaths of two Mexican nationals, including the 14-year-old Hernandez, at the hands of U.S. border police: "I demand the United States government conduct a thorough, impartial...investigation, concluding with an establishment of the facts and punishment of the culprits."

On June 12, 2010, the television network Univision aired cellphone video footage of the incident, after which Mexican legislators called unsuccessfully for the extradition of the officer accused of the shooting.

=== Death of José Antonio Elena Rodríguez ===
In October 2012, 16-year-old José Antonio Elena Rodríguez was killed in downtown Nogales, Mexico, when a Border Patrol agent, Lonnie Swartz, opened fire at a group of people allegedly throwing rocks at him; Rodriguez was shot eight times in the back and twice in the head. Swartz was criminally charged, but in November 2018, a jury found him not guilty.

=== Incidents involving use of tear gas and pepper spray ===
On November 25, 2013, the San Diego Tribune reported that 100 aliens who tried to cross the border illegally near the San Ysidro port were pepper-sprayed and tear-gassed after throwing bottles and rocks at border patrol agents. A similar incident was reported in November 2018.

=== Allegations of abuse ===
Various civil activist and human rights organizations have alleged abuses of undocumented immigrants by Border Patrol agents: According to the ACLU of Texas, between 2010 and December 13, 2021, there were 46 migrant deaths while in the custody of the Border Patrol, and 68 deaths as a result of Border Patrol-involved car chases.

In October 2021 Human Rights Watch released reports by U.S. asylum officers of over 160 reports of mistreatment by Border Patrol agents. In some cases the asylum officers apologized to the migrants for the treatment they had received from the Border Patrol. According to Clara Long, associate director of Human Rights Watch, "The documents make clear that reports of grievous C.B.P. [Customs and Border Protection] abuses—physical and sexual assaults, abusive detention conditions and violations of due process—are an open secret within D.H.S. [Department of Homeland Security]. They paint a picture of D.H.S. as an agency that appears to have normalized shocking abuses at the U.S. border."

In 2018, activists alleged that water and food supplies left for undocumented immigrants were regularly destroyed by the Border Patrol.

June 7, 2018: On a bus travelling from Bakersfield to Las Vegas, agents from the United States Border Patrol stopped and boarded a Greyhound bus at an agricultural checkpoint near the Nevada State Line. The United States Border Patrol agents had no authorization to stop the Greyhound bus or interrogate passengers since the location was not within the 100 air mile zone of the United States Border as authorized by section 287 of the INA. A passenger recognized that the agents of the United States Border Patrol lacked authorization to conduct their interrogations. All other passengers aboard the Greyhound bus were notified that United States Border Patrol agents were not supposed to be stopping the bus or conducting interrogations. After a short argument with the passenger who alerted everybody, the United States Border Patrol agents left the bus. Later, the passenger who had argued with the United States Border Patrol agents decided to post an online petition on change.org titled "Greyhound: Stop endangering migrants" as a warning for passengers against unauthorised searches by agents of DHS, ICE, and United States Border Patrol. The online petition has gathered over 60,934 signatures worldwide.

Between 2010 and 2011 alleged excessive use of force by Border Patrol agents and Field Operations officers led to the death of six Mexican citizens. A PBS report, Crossing the Line, released in July 2012, profiled the case of Hernández-Rojas who died after being beaten and while in custody of the USBP, ICE, and CBP in May 2010. In 2012, in a letter to President Obama posted on the website of the Washington Office on Latin America, 118 civil society organizations criticized the Border Patrol for failing to thoroughly investigate the incident and stated that the Border Patrol "is operating with very little transparency and virtual impunity, especially in the southern border region where Border Patrol and other CBP agents regularly violate the human and civil rights of those who call the border region home."

From 2008 to 2011, the Arizona organization No More Deaths interviewed nearly 13,000 undocumented immigrants who had been in Border Patrol custody, in the Arizona border towns of Naco, Nogales, and Agua Prieta. Their report, A Culture of Cruelty, documents alleged abuses including denial of or insufficient water and food; failure to provide medical treatment; verbal, physical and psychological abuse; separation of family members; and dangerous repatriation practices. In February 2012, Border Patrol chief Michael Fisher stated in congressional testimony that the Border Patrol takes allegations of abuse seriously. No More Deaths testified before the Inter-American Commission of Human Rights in March 2012 that in spite of raising their concerns for several years, "the agency has taken the position that such abuses simply do not occur."

There are allegations of abuse by the United States Border Patrol, such as the ones reported by Jesus A. Trevino, that concludes in an article published in the Houston Journal of International Law (2006) with a request to create an independent review commission to oversee the actions of the Border Patrol, and that creating such review board will make the American public aware of the "serious problem of abuse that exists at the border by making this review process public" and that "illegal immigrants deserve the same constitutionally-mandated humane treatment of citizens and legal residents".

In 1998, Amnesty International investigated allegations of ill-treatment and brutality by officers of the Immigration and Naturalization Service, and particularly the Border Patrol. Their report said they found indications of human rights violations during 1996, 1997, and early 1998.

An article in Social Justice by Michael Huspek, Leticia Jimenez, Roberto Martinez (1998) cites that in December 1997, John Case, head of the INS Office of Internal Audit, announced at a press conference that public complaints to the INS had risen 29% from 1996, with the "vast majority" of complaints emanating from the southwest border region, but that of the 2,300 cases, the 243 cases of serious allegations of abuse were down in 1997. These serious cases are considered to be distinct from less serious complaints, such as "verbal abuse, discrimination, extended detention without cause."

At some Greyhound stations and along certain routes, agents from United States Department of Homeland Security (DHS), U.S. Immigration and Customs Enforcement (ICE), and United States Border Patrol have been known to stop and interrogate passengers. While DHS, ICE, and US Border Patrol Agents are legally allowed to interrogate passengers within 100 air miles of the borders of the United States, according to the ACLU and some legal experts, without a warrant, United States Border Patrol agents need the explicit consent of Greyhound to be on Greyhound property. Protesters against Greyhound Bus Lines allowing the DHS and ICE agents to board the buses have posted an online petition titled "Greyhound: Stop Throwing Passengers Under the BUS" on the ACLU website, which gathered 111,895 signatures as of 2019. As of February 21, 2020 Greyhound refuses unwarranted inspections. A memo addressed to all chief patrol agents and signed by then-Border Patrol chief Carla Provost said agents can't board private buses without consent from bus companies.

Between September 2018 and September 2019, ten aliens died in the custody of the U.S. Border Patrol or its parent agency.

=== Corruption ===
According to Reveal News, between 2006 and 2016 more than 130 officers employed by U.S. Customs and Border Protection were caught in alleged acts of mission-compromising corruption – often by letting drugs, undocumented immigrants, or both into the country. "While that's a tiny fraction of the total number of agents, report after report has suggested the known cases may be the tip of the iceberg."

Incidents of corruption in the U.S. Border Patrol include:

- U.S. Customs and Border Protection gave Accenture Federal Services a $297 million contract in 2017 to hire 7,500 people over five years. An audit by the Department of Homeland Security found that, as of Oct. 1, 2018, Accenture had already been paid $13.6 million but had only hired two people.
- Pablo Sergio Barry, an agent charged with one count of harboring an undocumented immigrant (8 U.S.C. § 1324), three counts of false statements, and two counts of making a false document. He pleaded guilty.
- Christopher E. Bernis, an agent indicted on a charge of harboring an undocumented immigrant for nine months while employed as a U.S. Border Patrol Agent.
- Jose De Jesus Ruiz, an agent whose girlfriend was an undocumented immigrant. He was put on administrative leave pending an investigation.
- Oscar Antonio Ortiz, an undocumented immigrant who used a fake birth certificate to get into the Border Patrol. He admitted to smuggling more than 100 undocumented immigrants into the U.S., some of them in his government truck. He was charged with conspiring with another agent to smuggle aliens.
- An unidentified patrol agent who was recorded on a wiretap stating that he helped to smuggle 30 to 50 aliens at a time.
- Joel Luna, a Border Patrol agent, was convicted in 2017 of engaging in criminal activity and sentenced to 20 years in prison. He was acquitted on a murder charge. He was involved in smuggling drugs into the United States and guns to Mexico.

=== 2019 Facebook posts ===
In 2019, U.S. Border Patrol supervisors discovered many employees posting inappropriate content in a private Facebook group. The "group where agents posted sexist and callous references to migrants and the politicians who support them reinforced the perception that agents often view the vulnerable people in their care with frustration and contempt." Carla Provost, at the time head of the agency, was among them; she retired in 2020.

=== Second Trump administration ===
U.S. Border Patrol was described as "a national police force, answerable only to the president" by The Economist after numerous incidents during the second Trump administration. In a departure from its traditional role of patrolling the southern border, agents were deployed to urban, Democrat-run areas throughout the country to assist with the Trump administration's deportation efforts. The redeployment has led to extensive criticism for aggressive use of force across the country, including pointing weapons at and teargassing peaceful protestors and bystanders in Chicago during Operation Midway Blitz and choking a protester outside a detention facility in Durango, Colorado. Senior official Gregory Bovino faced multiple rebukes and restraining orders from District Court Judge Sara L. Ellis, who found that he lied under oath. Presidential advisor Stephen Miller falsely claimed that agents had federal immunity for any misconduct during performance of their duties.

== National council ==
National Border Patrol Council (NBPC) is the labor union which represents over 17,000 Border Patrol agents and support staff. The NBPC was founded on November 1, 1965, and its parent organization is the American Federation of Government Employees, AFL–CIO. The NBPC's executive committee is staffed by current and retired Border Patrol agents and, along with its constituent locals, employs a staff of a dozen attorneys and field representatives. The NBPC is associated with the Peace Officer Research Association of California Legal Defense Fund|California's Legal Defense Fund.

== Chiefs ==
The following persons have served as chief of the United States Border Patrol:

No.	Image	Name	Term start	Term end	Refs.
1		Willard F. Kelly	1924	1944	
2		John Nelson	1944	1946	
3		Donald Tollaer	1946	1950	
4		Harlon B. Carter (Note: First chief to have attended the Border Patrol Academy)	1950	1957	
5		James F. Greene	1957	1959	
6		Donald R. Coppock	1960	1973	
7		Robert L. Stewart	1973	1977	
8		Robin J. Clack	1977	1979	
Acting		Donald Day	1979	1980	
9		Roger P. "Buck" Brandemuehl	1980	1986	
10		Hugh Brien	1986	1989	
11		Michael S. Williams	1990	1995	
12		Douglas M. Kruhm	1995	December 31, 1997	
13		Gustavo de la Viña (Note: First Mexican-American chief)	January 1, 1998	June 30, 2004	
14		David V. Aguilar	July 1, 2004	January 2, 2010	
Acting		Michael J. Fisher	January 3, 2010	May 8, 2010	
15		Michael J. Fisher	May 9, 2010	November 30, 2015	
Acting		Ronald Vitiello	December 1, 2015	July 20, 2016	
16		Mark Morgan (Note: Resigned January 26, 2017)	October 11, 2016	January 31, 2017	
17		Ronald Vitiello (Note: Became Acting Deputy Commissioner of the CBP on April 26, 2017)	February 1, 2017	April 25, 2017	
Acting		Carla Provost (Note: Promoted to permanent post, first female chief. Sworn in on August 9, 2018.)	April 26, 2017	August 8, 2018	
18		Carla Provost	August 9, 2018	January 31, 2020	
24†		Rodney S. Scott	February 1, 2020	August 14, 2021	
25†		Raúl Ortiz	August 15, 2021	June 30, 2023	
26†		Jason Owens	July 1, 2023	January 20, 2025	
27†		Michael W. Banks	January 20, 2025	May 14, 2026	
28†		Rosario 'Pete' Vasquez	June 1, 2026		

† – There appears to be a discrepancy in the number of chiefs after Carla Provost as officially reported by the U.S. Border Patrol. For example, USBP officially considers Rodney Scott to be its 24th chief and not the 19th, and Michael W. Banks to be its 27th chief and not the 22nd.

Table notes:

== See also ==
- Airspace
- Bering Strait
- Border control
- Border guard
- Border Network for Human Rights
- CBP Office of Air and Marine
- CBP Office of Field Operations
- Diplomatic Security Service (DSS), U.S. State Department
- Federal law enforcement in the United States § List of agencies and units of agencies
- Illegal immigration to Canada
- Illegal immigration to Mexico
- Illegal immigration to Russia
- Illegal immigration to the United States
- Immigration law
- List of immigrant detention sites in the United States
- Maritime boundary
- Minuteman Project
- Missing in Brooks County
- National Border Patrol Museum
- No More Deaths
- Operation Gatekeeper
- 2025 shooting of Texas Border Patrol officers
