= David V. Aguilar =

Former Deputy Commissioner of U.S. Customs and Border Protection

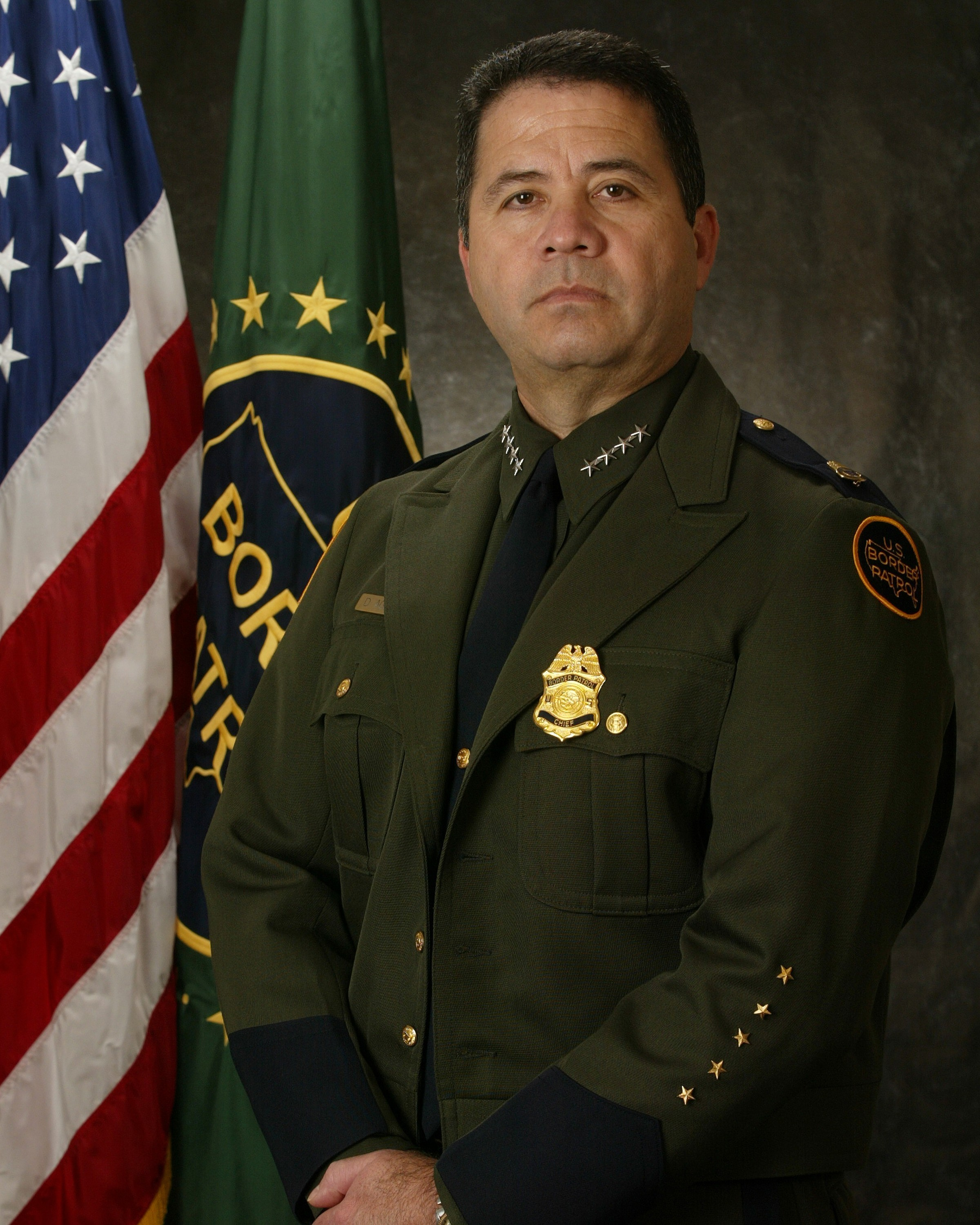

Chief of the Border Patrol
- In office July 1, 2004 – January 2, 2010
- President: George W. Bush; Barack Obama
- Preceded by: Gustavo de la Viña
- Succeeded by: Michael J. Fisher

Commissioner of U.S. Customs and Border Protection
- Acting
- In office December 30, 2011 – March 30, 2013
- President: Barack Obama
- Preceded by: Alan Bersin (acting)
- Succeeded by: Thomas S. Winkowski (acting)

Personal details
- Born: December 1955 (age 70) Edinburg, Texas
- Education: Laredo State University (AS)

David V. Aguilar is the former Deputy Commissioner of U.S. Customs and Border Protection. In this position, he oversaw more than 43,000 Federal Agents and Officers. As the nation's highest ranking Border Patrol Agent, Aguilar managed the nation's border control policing. Aguilar retired on February 8, 2013.

== Career ==
Entered on duty in June 1978 at Laredo, Texas. Aguilar also served as Patrol Agent in Charge of three different Border Patrol Stations in Texas from 1988 to August 1996. In January 1988 he was first promoted to Patrol Agent in Charge of the Dallas Border Patrol Station in Dallas, Texas. In 1992 he was promoted to the Rio Grande City Border Patrol Station in Rio Grande City, Texas. In July 1995 he was promoted to the Brownsville Border Patrol Station in Brownsville, Texas.

Aguilar is a supporter of "comprehensive immigration reform" but told his membership that he does not support "amnesty" or "legalization." He has been accused by a whistleblower of hindering internal investigations into Border Patrol corruption.

On March 31, 2013 David Aguilar retired after 35 years of federal service with U.S. Customs and Border Protection and the United States Border Patrol. After his retirement, Aguilar partnered with Noah Kroloff, Dennis Burke, Mark Sullivan, John Kaites and Jerry Reinsdorf to found Global Security and Innovative Strategies.

== Personal ==
Aguilar is a native of Edinburg, Texas, and a 1974 graduate of Edinburg High School.

Aguilar received an associate degree in Accounting from Laredo Community College, attended Laredo State University (now Texas A&M International University) and University of Texas at Arlington. He is a graduate of the Senior Executive Fellows program at the John F. Kennedy School of Government. He's numerous awards, including the Presidential Rank Award in 2008, the President’s Meritorious Excellence Award in 2005, the Homeland Security Distinguished Service Medal, the Washington Homeland Security Roundtable Lifetime Achievement Award, and the Institute for Defense and Government Advancement Lifetime Achievement. Chief Aguilar and his wife of 35 years, Bea, have three children and four grandchildren.

Political offices
| Preceded by Gustavo de la Viña | Chief of the Border Patrol; July 1, 2004–January 2010 | Succeeded by Michael J. Fisher |
| Preceded by Alan Bersin; Acting | Commissioner of U.S. Customs and Border Protection; 2011–2013 | Succeeded by Thomas S. Winkowski; Acting |
