= Illegal immigration to the United States =

Immigration to the United States in violation of US law

Illegal immigration, or unauthorized immigration, occurs when foreign nationals, known as aliens or non-citizens, violate US immigration laws by entering the United States unlawfully, or by lawfully entering but then remaining after the expiration of their visas, parole or temporary protected status.

Between 2007 and 2018, visa overstays accounted for a larger share of the growth in the undocumented immigrant population of the United States than illegal border crossings, which declined considerably from 2000 to 2018. In 2022, 37% of unauthorized immigrants were from Mexico, the smallest share on record. El Salvador, India, Guatemala and Honduras were the next four largest countries. As of 2016, approximately two-thirds of unauthorized adult immigrants had lived in the US for at least a decade. As of 2022, unauthorized immigrants made up 3.3% of the US population, though nearly one-third of those immigrants have temporary permission to be in the United States, such as those in Deferred Action for Childhood Arrivals. According to an August 2025 Pew Research Center report, the unauthorized immigrant population grew by 3.5 million between 2021 and 2023, reaching a record 14 million. July 2024 data for border crossings showed the lowest level of border crossing since September 2020.

Opponents of illegal immigration worry about crime, as well as possible social and economic burdens caused by migration. However, studies and FBI data have consistently found that undocumented immigrants are less likely to commit crimes than native-born citizens in the United States. In Texas, for example, undocumented immigrants are arrested for violent and drug crimes at less than half the rate of native-born U.S. citizens, and a quarter the rate of native-born citizens for property crimes. Opponents also insist immigrants enter the United States through a formal process and do not want to reward those bypassing the system.

Research shows that illegal immigration increases the size of the US economy, contributes to economic growth, enhances the welfare of natives, contributes more in tax revenue than they collect, reduces American firms' incentives to offshore jobs and import foreign-produced goods, and benefits consumers by reducing the prices of goods and services. Economists estimate that legalization of the illegal immigrant population would increase the immigrants' earnings and consumption considerably, and increase US gross domestic product. Most scientific studies have shown that undocumented immigrants commit less crime than natives and legal immigrants. Sanctuary cities—which adopt policies designed to avoid prosecuting people solely for being in the country illegally—have no statistically meaningful impact on crime. Research suggests that immigration enforcement has no impact on crime rates.

== Definitions ==
The categories of foreign-born people in the United States are:

- US citizens born outside the United States who are naturalized or citizens by adoption.
- Non-citizens with current status to reside, work, or visit in the US (documented)
- Non-citizens without current status to reside, work, or visit in the US (undocumented)
- Non-citizens who are prohibited from entry (inadmissible)

The latter two fall under the category of illegal immigration. As they have no legal documentation to entitle them to be in the US, they are also referred to as undocumented immigrants or undocumented Americans. Persons who acquired US citizenship or nationality at birth, whether through birth on US territory, or through US citizen parents, are not classified as foreign born.

== History ==
Rigorous immigration controls were first enacted with the Page Act of 1875, banning Chinese women, and the Chinese Exclusion Act of 1882, expanded to all Chinese immigrants.

=== Supreme Court decisions ===
Since the late 19th century, various Supreme Court rulings established the Constitutional rights of noncitizens. In Yick Wo v. Hopkins (1886), the court ruled that under the Fourteenth Amendment, all residents, regardless of "race, of color, or of nationality" have the right to due process and equal protection under the law. A similar ruling of Wong Wing v. US (1896) stated that all persons within the territory of the United States are afforded equal protections under the Fifth Amendment and Sixth Amendment. A 1904 US Supreme Court decision concluded that deporting, "pursuant to law, an alien who has illegally entered the United States does not deprive him of his liberty without due process of law".

=== Legislation ===
The Naturalization Act of 1906 required immigrants to learn English in order to become citizens. The Immigration Act of 1917 defined aliens with a long list of undesirables, including most Asians. The US had otherwise nearly open borders until the early 20th century, with only 1% rejected from 1890 to 1924, usually because they failed the mental or health exam. While immigration laws during those years were loose, laws limiting naturalization to those of "white" and "African" descent meant many other immigrants had difficulty acquiring citizenship. These regulations immediately created problems of interpretation – the contentious question of who was and was not "white" vexed even the officials charged with enforcing the law and led to significant criticism. The Union of American Hebrew Congregations noted that under the standing interpretation that Turks, Syrians, Palestinians and Jews were not white, "even Jesus of Nazareth himself" would be excluded from citizenship. As a result, judges and immigration officials often admitted and naturalized technically ineligible people as a form of protest against the laws.

The Immigration Act of 1924 established visa requirements and enacted quotas for immigrants from specific countries, especially with low quotas for Southern and Eastern Europeans. Especially it affected Italians and Jews. It also prohibited all Asians from immigrating. By 1940, administrative and legislative action had loosened racial restrictions on naturalization of immigrants, including a ruling that Mexicans were considered white for immigration and naturalization purposes, and a law permitting the naturalization of "descendants of races indigenous to the Western Hemisphere." The quotas were eased in the Immigration and Nationality Act of 1952. The decisive opening came in 1965, a year after the Civil Rights Act of 1964 outlawed discrimination based on race or national origin. The Immigration and Nationality Act of 1965 abolished the quota system. The 1965 Act also established several new limits to which immigrants would be admissible for permanent residence in the United States.

The Immigration Act of 1990 increased the annual immigrant limit to 675,000 per year. In 1996, Congress debated two immigration bills, one focused on limiting legal immigration and another on illegal immigration. The legal immigration reform bills failed to pass, while the illegal immigration bill was passed in the form of the Illegal Immigration Reform and Immigrant Responsibility Act of 1996. President Bill Clinton signed the Act into law and it became effective on April 1, 1997. The key components of the Act included increasing the number of border agents, increasing penalties on those who smuggled immigrants into the United States, creating a 10-year re-entry ban on those who had been deported after living in the US illegally for over one year, and expanding the list of crimes that any immigrant (regardless of legal status) could be deported for.

In February 2024 and again in May 2024, Republicans in the Senate blocked a border security bill Joe Biden had pushed for to reduce the number of migrants who can claim the right of asylum at the border and provide more money for Customs and Border Protection officials, asylum officers, immigration judges and scanning technology at the border. It was negotiated in a bipartisan manner and initially looked like it had the votes to pass until Donald Trump opposed it, claiming that it would boost Biden's reelection chances. Five senators on the left voted against it for not providing enough relief for migrants already in the United States.

=== Border controls ===
As a proportion of U.S. population, nationwide border encounters have varied substantially over the decades.

US southwest border encounters decreased with Trump's second term which began in 2025.

As early as 1904, mounted border watchmen were employed by the US Immigration Service to prevent illegal southern border crossings. Texas Rangers were also often employed along the Texas border with Mexico. The US Border Patrol was also officially created in 1924, with its duties in 1925 broadened to include guarding the sea coast. Illegal entry into the United States became a particular problem during Prohibition, when bootleggers and smugglers would illegally enter the country to transport alcohol.

The debate over illegal immigration has continued amongst the fear of potential terrorist attacks in the wake of the September 11 attacks in 2001 and the lack of an effective Mexico–United States barrier. President Donald Trump enacted a travel ban from seven Muslim-majority countries, which was struck down as unconstitutional and replaced by a narrower version drafted by the Justice Department, which Trump described as "watered down, politically correct" and which was subsequently upheld by the Supreme Court. During his election campaign, Trump falsely promised to make Mexico pay for a new border wall. The Mexican government refused to do so, and US taxpayers paid for the wall. The federal government entered a partial shutdown from December 22, 2018, to January 25, 2019, in a standoff over Trump's demand for $5.7 billion in funding for the wall.

=== US Marines scandal ===
In 2020, 24 US Marines were discharged after an investigation over their alleged involvement in drug crimes and a human smuggling operation along the US–Mexico border. The investigation began when US Border Patrol agents arrested two marines for transporting three illegal Mexican immigrants on July 3, 2019. On July 25, 2019, 16 marines and a US Navy sailor were arrested on base during a battalion formation. The last arrest occurred on December 2, 2019, when a marine was caught transporting two illegal Chinese immigrants near the border.

The ringleader of the human smuggling operation was identified as Francisco Saul Rojas-Hernandez. Some of the marines in court said Rojas-Hernandez would pay them $1,000 per person that they helped transport. 8 marines pled guilty, however some had their charges dropped after a judge said that the arrest of the 16 marines in front of a battalion formation was a violation of their rights. The US Marine Corps still took administrative or judicial action against the 24 marines involved. According to 1st Lieutenant Cameron Edinburgh, one marine received a general discharge under honorable conditions, at least one marine received a dishonorable discharge, two received bad conduct discharges, and 19 received other than honorable discharges. The Navy sailor was also removed from service with a bad conduct discharge.

== Profile and demographics ==
In 2022, 6.3 million households include an unauthorized immigrant, representing 4.8% of the 130 million U.S. households. Representing about 4.8% of the U.S. workforce, the number of unauthorized immigrants in the U.S. workforce was 8.3 million in 2022, which equals previous highs of 2008 and 2011. At its lowest number since the 1990s, 4.0 million unauthorized immigrants from Mexico were living in the U.S. in 2022. Following Mexico, unauthorised immigrants are from El Salvador (750,000), India (725,000), Guatemala (675,000) and Honduras (525,000), while the largest increases in numbers were from the Caribbean (300,000) and Europe and Canada (275,000).

=== Breakdown by top ten states ===
The following data table shows a spread of distribution as of 2021 of the unauthorized immigrant population nationally and by top ten states. There was a significant change from 2017: Florida (+80,000), Washington (+60,000), California (-150,000), and Nevada (-25,000).

Unauthorized immigrant population to US in the top ten states of residence
| State of residence | Estimated population, January 2021 | Percent of total |
|---|---|---|
| All states | 10,500,000 | 100 |
| California | 1,850,000 | 18 |
| Texas | 1,600,000 | 15 |
| Florida | 900,000 | 9 |
| New York | 600,000 | 6 |
| New Jersey | 450,000 | 4 |
| Illinois | 400,000 | 4 |
| Georgia | 350,000 | 3 |
| North Carolina | 325,000 | 3 |
| Massachusetts | 300,000 | 3 |
| Washington | 300,000 | 3 |
| Other states | 3,425,000 | 33 |

=== Population ===
From 2005 to 2009, the number of people entering the US illegally every year declined from a yearly average of 850,000 in the early 2000s to 300,000 in 2009, according to the Pew Hispanic Center. As of 2014, unauthorized immigrant adults had lived in the US for a median of 13.6 years, with approximately two-thirds having lived in the US for at least a decade. Pew Research Center reported 9.7 million unauthorized immigrants in the US workforce in 2023 out of a total of an all-time high of 14 million unauthorized immigrants living in the United States, estimating that those numbers increased in 2024 and began decreasing in 2025.

Narrowing the discussion to only Mexican nationals, a 2015 study performed by demographers of the University of Texas at San Antonio and the University of New Hampshire found that immigration from Mexico; both legal and illegal, peaked in 2003 and that from the period between 2003 and 2007 to the period of 2008 to 2012, immigration from Mexico decreased 57%. The dean of the College of Public Policy of the University of Texas at San Antonio, Rogelio Saenz, states that lower birth rates and the growing economy in Mexico slowed emigration, creating more jobs for Mexicans. Saenz also states that Mexican immigrants are no longer coming to find jobs but to flee from violence, noting that the majority of those escaping crime "are far more likely to be naturalized US citizens".

According to a 2017 National Bureau of Economic Research paper, "The number of undocumented immigrants has declined in absolute terms, while the overall population of low-skilled, foreign-born workers has remained stable. ... because major source countries for US immigration are now seeing and will continue to see weak growth of the labor supply relative to the United States, future immigration rates of young, low-skilled workers appear unlikely to rebound, whether or not US immigration policies tighten further." As of mid-2024, PolitiFact listed several estimates by immigration groups of the number of people illegally in the U.S. dating from November 2023 to March 2024:

- 11.2 million in 2021, up from 11 million in 2019, (Migration Policy Institute).
- 10.5 million in 2021, up from 10.2 million in 2019, (Pew Research Center).
- 10.9 million in 2022, up from 10.3 million in 2021, (Center for Migration Studies of New York).
- 14 million in March 2024 (preliminary estimate), up from 12.3 million in May 2023, and 10.2 million in January 2021, (the Center for Immigration Studies, which favors low immigration levels).
- 16.8 million in 2023, the (Federation for American Immigration Reform, which favors reduced immigration).

=== Children ===
The United States is one of roughly 30 countries, including Canada and Mexico, that offer automatic citizenship to nearly everyone born there. In the US, birthright citizenship was added to the Constitution in 1868 when the Fourteenth Amendment to the United States Constitution was adopted following the Civil War. The executive order issued by Trump in January 2025 seeking to end birthright citizenship has never gone into effect as the ACLU, the Legal Defense Fund, the Asian Law Caucus, Democracy Defenders Fund, the League of United Latin American Citizens and other challengers argue that the order conflicts with both the text of the Constitution and the court's longstanding case law. The Pew Hispanic Center determined that according to an analysis of Census Bureau data about 8 percent of children born in the United States in 2008—about 340,000—have at least one parent is an unauthorized immigrant. In total, 4 million US-born children of unauthorized immigrant parents resided in the country in 2009.

The provisions of the 1996 immigration law mean that an undocumented parent of a citizen child who entered the country without permission ("illegal entry") would need to leave the United States and wait a number of years before they would be able to apply for a visa to return to the US or gain legal residency on the basis of family reunification, while undocumented parents who legally entered the United States (for example overstaying a visa) can in some cases be sponsored by their adult citizen child for legal residency without necessarily having to leave the country. Children who automatically qualifies as an American citizen under jus soliare sometimes derogatively referred to by the pejorative term anchor babies because of the belief that the mother gave birth in the United States as a way to anchor their family in the US. Additionally, households headed by an undocumented parent are not eligible for many public assistance programs (ex. not eligible for TANF or temporary cash assistance to families with children in extreme poverty, "Obamacare" subsidies for health insurance or expanded Medicaid to working-age low-income adults, public housing, Section 8 housing voucher program) regardless of whether their child is a United States citizen or not, with some exceptions (Medicaid/SCHIP for the US citizen child, SNAP/"foodstamps" on behalf of a US citizen child, the temporarily expanded child-tax credit in 2021–2022, as well as some state and city programs specifically designed to include undocumented residents and their families)

=== Organized migrant caravans ===
For several years, Pueblo Sin Fronteras, which means "People Without Borders" has organized an annual part-protest, part-mass migration march, from Honduras, through Mexico, to the United States border, where asylum in the United States is requested. In April 2018, the annual "Stations of the Cross Caravan" saw 1,000 Central Americans trying to reach the United States, prompting President Trump to deem it a threat to national security and announce plans to send the national guard to protect the US border. In October 2018, a second caravan of the year left the city of San Pedro Sula the day after US vice-president, Mike Pence, urged the presidents of Honduras, El Salvador and Guatemala to persuade their citizens to stay home.

=== 2011–2016 surge in unaccompanied minors from Central America ===
Over the period 2011–2016, US Border Patrol apprehended 178,825 unaccompanied minors from El Salvador, Honduras, and Guatemala. The provisions of the William Wilberforce Trafficking Victims Protection Reauthorization Act of 2008, which specifies safe repatriation of unaccompanied children (other than those trafficked for sex or forced labor) from countries which do not have a common border with the United States, such as the nations of Central America other than Mexico, made expeditious deportation of the large number of children from Central America who came to the United States in 2014 difficult and expensive, prompting a call by President Barack Obama for an emergency appropriation of $4 billion and resulting in discussions by the Department of Justice and Congress of how to interpret or revise the law in order to expedite handling large numbers of children under the act.

A 2016 study found that Deferred Action for Childhood Arrivals (DACA), which provided qualified individuals with a two-year reprieve from deportation proceedings and the ability to obtain work authorization if they migrated to the United States before their 16th birthday and prior to June 2007, did not significantly impact the number of apprehensions of unaccompanied minors from Central America. Rather, the study stated, "the 2008 Williams Wilberforce Trafficking Victims Protection Reauthorization Act, along with violence in the originating countries and economic conditions in both the countries of origin and the United States, emerge as some of the key determinants of the recent surge in unaccompanied minors apprehended along the southwest US–Mexico border." According to a 2015 report by the Government Accountability Office, the primary drivers of the surge "were crime and lack of economic opportunity at home. Other reasons included education concerns, desire to rejoin family and aggressive recruiting by smugglers." A 2017 Center for Global Development study stated that violence was the primary driver behind the surge in unaccompanied Central American minors to the United States: an additional 10 homicides in Central America made 6 unaccompanied children flee to the US. The widespread promulgation of false "permiso" rumors by human smugglers, as well as migrant perception of the Obama administration's immigration policies, also played a part in the increase.

=== 2018 family separation policy ===
In April 2018, then-attorney general of the Trump administration Jeff Sessions announced a family separation policy regarding migrants crossing the US southern border without a visa. Migrants and accompanying family members who had entered the country who were alleged to have entered illegally and were apprehended or turned themselves in to Border Control agents were charged with criminal entry. If these family units had children, they were separated, with adults placed in detention centers to await immigration proceedings and the children in separate facilities or with a relative already in the US. There was widespread condemnation of this policy including that of notable evangelical Christian leaders such as Franklin Graham.

=== Countries of origin ===
According to the US Department of Homeland Security, the countries of origin for the largest numbers of unauthorized immigrants are as follows (as of 2014):

Unauthorized immigrants to US by country of origin
| Country of origin | Raw number | Percent of total |
|---|---|---|
| Mexico | 6,640,000 | 55 |
| El Salvador | 700,000 | 6 |
| Guatemala | 640,000 | 5 |
| India | 430,000 | 4 |
| Honduras | 400,000 | 3 |
| Philippines | 360,000 | 3 |
| China | 270,000 | 2 |
| Korea | 250,000 | 2 |
| Vietnam | 200,000 | 2 |
| Dominican Republic | 180,000 | 1 |
| Other | 2,050,000 | 17 |
| Total | 12,120,000 | |

According to the Migration Policy Institute, Mexicans represented 53% of the unauthorized immigrantspopulation. The next largest percentages were from Asia (16%), El Salvador (6%), and Guatemala (5%). The Urban Institute also estimates "between 65,000 and 75,000 Canadians currently live illegally in the United States." According to the Pew Research Center, there are an estimated 725,000 Indian nationals living in the US illegally, making them the third largest group after the nationals from Mexico and El Salvador. A study at the Johns Hopkins University (JHU) found that the number of asylum seekers from India in the U.S. increased from 9,000 in 2018 to 51,000 in 2023, a rise of 466%. Since the US immigration system allows foreigners arrested at the border to request asylum, these requests highlight a trend of increasing illegal immigration to the US. The number of Indian nationals arrested for illegal border crossings in the U.S. rose from 1,000 in 2020 to 43,000 in 2023.

=== Trends ===
Apprehensions between ports of entry, annually by calendar year

In 2017, illegal border crossing arrests hit a 46-year low, and were down 25% from the previous year. NPR stated that immigrants may be less likely to attempt to enter the US illegally because of President Trump's stance on illegal immigration. The majority of immigrants are non-European. Studies have shown that 40 million foreign born residents live in the US. The main reason that the US sustains a relatively young labor force in the twenty-first century is the influx of younger immigrants from across the world with intellectual and monetary aspirations. During the 1950s, there were 45,000 documented immigrants from Central America. In the 1960s, this number more than doubled to 100,000. In the decade after, it increased to 134,000. In 2019, after being threatened with punitive tariffs, Mexico agreed to a deal with the US to better stem the flow of migrants passing through the country to enter the US. In September 2019, Mexican foreign minister Marcelo Ebrard stated that immigration to the U.S. through Mexico has decreased significantly, and that this trend is "irreversible. ... It is something that we think will be permanent."

=== Illegal entry ===
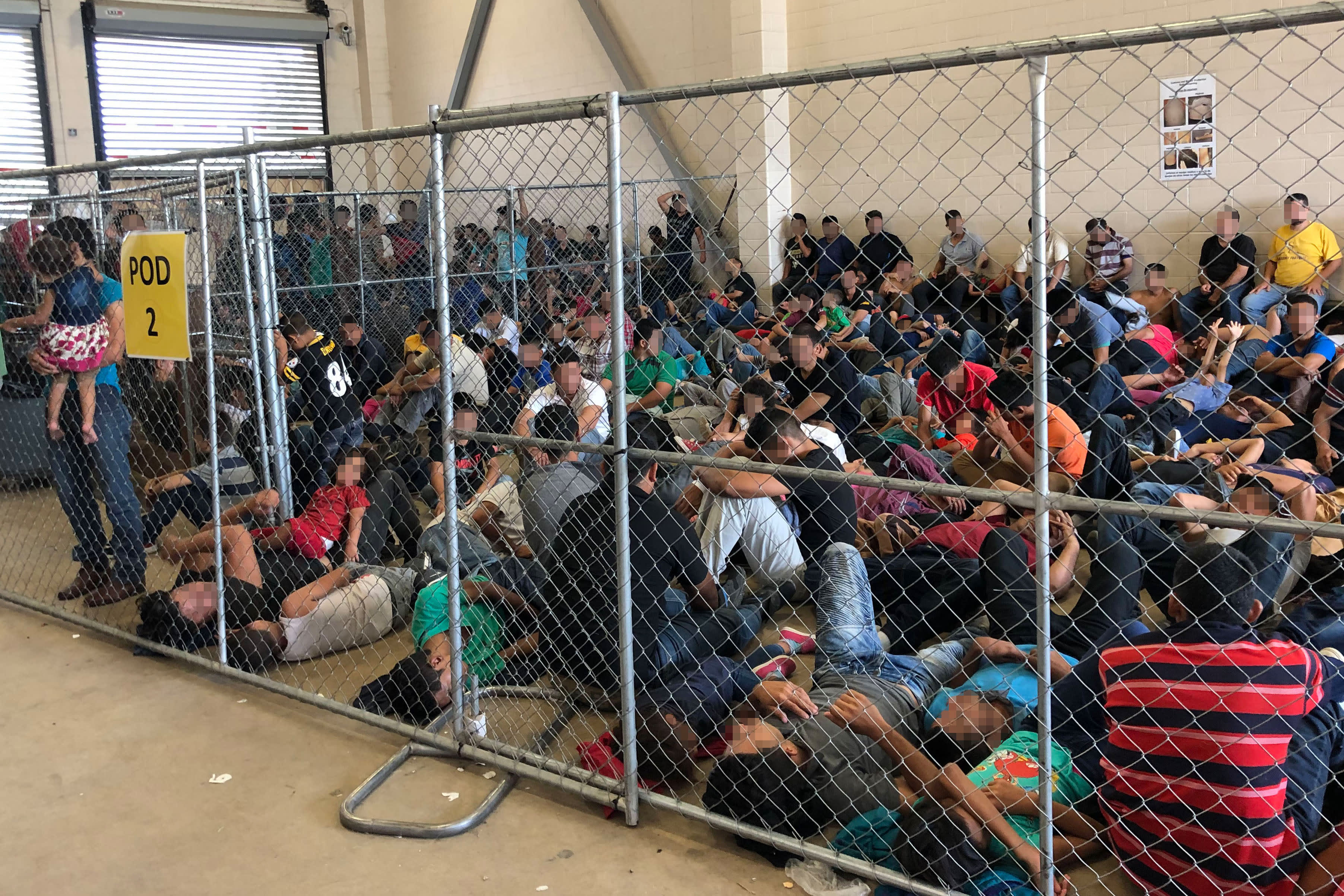
Detained illegal immigrants at the overcrowded United States Border Patrol's McAllen, Texas station, 2019

There are an estimated half million illegal entries into the United States each year. The Pew Hispanic Center estimated that 6–7 million immigrants came to the United States via illegal entry (the rest entering via legal visas allowing a limited stay, but then not leaving when their visa period ended). Illegal border crossings declined considerably from 2000, when 71,000–220,000 migrants were apprehended each month, to 2018 when 20,000–40,000 migrants were apprehended. On October 31, 2023, Homeland Security Secretary Alejandro Mayorkas testified before the Senate Homeland Security Committee, saying that more than 600,000 people illegally made their way into the United States without being apprehended by border agents during the 2023 fiscal year.

A common means of border crossing is to hire people smugglers to help them across the border. Those operating on the US–Mexico border are known informally as coyotajes (coyotes), and are often part of extensive criminal networks throughout Mexico. Criminal gangs smuggling people from China are known as snakeheads, and charge as much as US$70,000 per person, which immigrants often promise to pay with money they hope to earn in the United States.

At the border, US Customs and Border Protection either takes migrants into custody or releases them into the country. The term "gotaway" is defined by the Department of Homeland Security as "a person who is not turned back or apprehended after making an illegal entry" along a US border. A "gotaway" is recorded when cameras or sensors detect migrants crossing the border, but no one is found, or agents are not available to respond. An unknown number of migrants also escape detection entirely.

=== Visa overstay ===
A tourist or traveler is considered a "visa overstay" once they remain in the United States after the time of admission has expired. The time of admission varies greatly from traveler to traveler depending on the visa class into which they were admitted. According to Pew in 2006, between 4 and 5.5 million foreigners entered the United States with a legal visa, accounting for between 33 and 48% of the total unauthorized migrant population. Visa overstays tend to be somewhat more educated and better off financially than those who entered the country illegally. In most instances, overstaying a visa is a civil "wrong" and not necessarily a crime, though the person is still subject to deportation for unlawful presence.

To help track visa overstayers the US-VISIT (United States Visitor and Immigrant Status Indicator Technology) program collects and retains biographic, travel, and biometric information, such as photographs and fingerprints, of foreign nationals seeking entry into the United States. It also requires electronic readable passports containing this information. Visa overstayers mostly enter with tourist or business visas. In 1994, more than half of illegal immigrants were Visa overstayers whereas in 2006, about 45% of illegal immigrants were Visa overstayers. Those who leave the United States after overstaying their visa for more than 180 days but less than one year, leave and then attempt to apply for readmission will face a three-year ban which will not allow them to re-enter the US for that period. Those who leave the United States after overstaying their visa for a period of one year or longer, leave and then attempt to apply for readmission will face a ten-year ban.

=== Border Crossing Card violation ===
A smaller number of Mexican nationals entered the United States legally using the Border Crossing Card, a card that authorizes border crossings into the US for a set amount of time. Border Crossing Card entry accounts for the vast majority of all registered non-immigrant entry into the United States—148 million out of 179 million total—but there is little hard data as to how much of the unauthorised immigrant population entered in this way. The Pew Hispanic Center estimates the number at around 250,000–500,000.

=== In the workforce ===
During the "Lost Decade", the Latin American debt crisis of the 1980s, a period in which per capita income and investment dropped as unemployment and underemployment increased, leading to the migration of workers to the United States. Migrants to the United States via Mexican land routes were drawn into the violent dynamics of narco-traffic, organized crime, and human smuggling operations, aggravating continuing poverty and unemployment, which remained constitutive elements of postwar Central America and fed ongoing migration of workers and families. For the US manufacturing sector, this oversupply of low-wage labor kept wages low, while professional and high-tech business services developed a structural need for these low-wage workers in wide-ranging, labor-intensive, personal and household and business services that support high-skilled service workers and firms. Congress passed the Personal Responsibility and Work Opportunity Act (PRWORA) in 1996. This prevented most lawfully residing non-citizens from receiving public assistance under the major federal benefits programs for five years or longer, including:

- Lawful permanent residents (people with green cards)
- Refugees (1 year for refugee status)
- Immigrants granted asylum or those with conditional entrants
- Immigrants granted parole by the U.S. Department of Homeland Security (DHS) for at least one year
- Immigrants whose deportations are being withheld
- Cuban/Haitian entrants
- Battered immigrant spouses, battered immigrant children, immigrant parents of battered children, and immigrant children of battered parents
- Survivors of a severe form of trafficking.

In 2000, Congress established a new category of noncitizens — survivors of trafficking — who are eligible for federal public benefits to the same extent as refugees, regardless of whether they have a qualified immigrant status. PRWORA prohibited states from giving professional licenses to undocumented workers, although "clearly mass deportation would hurt certain service industries, such as the undocumented work of cooks and other restaurant workers, construction labor, maids and housekeepers, grounds maintenance and agricultural workers". The implementation of PRWORA demonstrated the shift towards personal responsibility over "public dependency."

== Causes ==
There are numerous incentives that draw foreigners to the US. Most immigrants who come to America come for better opportunities for employment, a greater degree of freedom, avoidance of political oppression, freedom from violence, famine, and family reunification. International polls by Gallup in 2021 found that the US remained the most-desired destination country for potential migrants worldwide, followed by Canada and Germany.

=== Causes by region ===
In general, immigrants from Mexico and Central America come to the US as they flee from insecurity and violence in their own country (i.e. kidnappings, rape or forced recruitment in gangs), or in search for better economic opportunities. Political corruption, failed institutions, and extortion by gangs contribute to this weak economy and lack of opportunity. With a pattern of persecution of Christians in Iran, Iranian converts to Christianity from Islam face the death penalty. Peyman Malaz, chief operating officer of the PARS Equality Center, noted that "Those who arrive at the border are often the most persecuted and desperate, such as Iranian Christians". Matthew Soerens, U.S. Director of Church Mobilization for World Relief, noted that in 2024, "30,000 of the 100,000 refugees resettled in the U.S. were Christians fleeing persecution."

=== Economic incentives ===
Economic reasons are one motivation for people to illegally immigrate to the United States. United States employers hire illegal immigrants at wages substantially higher than they could earn in their native countries. A study of illegal immigrants from Mexico in the 1978 harvest season in Oregon showed that they earned six times what they could have earned in Mexico, and even after deducting the costs of the seasonal migration and the additional expense of living in the United States, their net US earnings were three times their Mexican alternative. In the 1960s and early 70s, Mexico's high fertility rate caused a large increase in population. While Mexican population growth has slowed, the large numbers of people born in the 1960s and 70s are now of working age looking for jobs. According to Judith Gans of the University of Arizona, United States employers are pushed to hire illegal immigrants for three main reasons:

1. Global economic change. Global economic change is one cause for illegal immigration because information and transportation technologies now foster internationalized production, distribution and consumption, and labor. This has encouraged many countries to open their economies to outside investment, then increasing the number of low-skilled workers participating in global labor markets and making low-skilled labor markets all more competitive. This and the fact that developed countries have shifted from manufacturing to knowledge-based economies, have realigned economic activity around the world. Labor has become more international as individuals immigrate seeking work, despite governmental attempts to control this migration. Because the United States education system creates relatively few people who either lack a high school diploma or who hold PhDs, there is a shortage of workers needed to fulfill seasonal low-skilled jobs as well as certain high-skilled jobs. To fill these gaps, the United States immigration system attempts to compensate for these shortages by providing for temporary immigration by farm workers and seasonal low-skilled workers, and for permanent immigration by high-skilled workers.
2. A lack of legal immigration channels.
3. The ineffectiveness of current employer sanctions for illegal hiring. This allows immigrants who are in the country illegally to easily find jobs. There are three reasons for this ineffectiveness—the absence of reliable mechanisms for verifying employment eligibility, inadequate funding of interior immigration enforcement, and the absence of political will due to labor needs to the United States economy. For example, it is unlawful to knowingly hire an illegal immigrant, but according to Judith Gans, there are no reliable mechanisms in place for employers to verify that the immigrants' papers are authentic.

Another reason for the large numbers of illegal immigrants present in the United States is the termination of the Bracero Program. This bi-national program between the US and Mexico existed from 1942 to 1964 to supply qualified Mexican laborers as guest workers to harvest fruits and vegetables in the United States. During World War II, the program benefited the US war effort by replacing citizens' labor in agriculture to serve as soldiers overseas. The program was designed to provide legal flows of qualified laborers to the US Many Mexicans deemed unqualified for the program nonetheless immigrated illegally to the United States to work. In doing that they broke both US and Mexican law. Many workers that took advantage of the program became illegal residents, as they still had incentives to stay in the US despite the fact that they were breaking the law. Although the bracero program had ended, the period still saw a massive spike in migrant population in the US.

=== Channels for legal immigration ===
The United States immigration system provides channels for legal, permanent economic immigration, especially for high-skilled workers. For low-skilled workers, temporary or seasonal legal immigration is easier to acquire. The United States immigration system rests on three pillars: family reunification, provision of scarce labor (as in agricultural and specific high-skilled worker sectors), and protecting American workers from competition with foreign workers. The current system sets an overall limit of 675,000 permanent immigrants each year; this limit does not apply to spouses, unmarried minor children or parents of US citizens. Outside of this number for permanent immigrants, 480,000 visas are allotted for those under the family-preference rules and 140,000 are allocated for employment-related preferences. The current system and low number of visas available make it difficult for low-skilled workers to legally and permanently enter the country to work, so illegal entry becomes the way immigrants respond to the lure of jobs with higher wages than what they would be able to find in their current country.

=== Family reunification ===
According to demographer Jeffery Passel of the Pew Hispanic Center, the flow of Mexicans to the US has produced a "network effect"—furthering immigration as Mexicans moved to join relatives already in the US.

=== Further incentives ===
Lower costs of transportation, communication and information has facilitated illegal immigration. Mexican nationals, in particular, have a very low financial cost of immigration and can easily cross the border. Even if it requires more than one attempt, they have a very low probability of being detected and then deported once they have entered the country. A 2016 research paper published in the American Journal of Sociology hypothesized that border militarization, which took place between 1986 and 2008, in the United States had the unintended consequence of increasing illegal immigration to the United States, as migrants who entered the United States seasonally for work opted to stay permanently in the United States and bring their families once it became harder to move across the border regularly.

== Mexican federal and state government assistance ==
The US Department of Homeland Security and some advocacy groups have criticized a program of the government of the state of Yucatán and that of a federal Mexican agency directed to Mexicans migrating to and residing in the United States. They state that the assistance includes advice on how to get across the US border illegally, where to find healthcare, enroll their children in public schools, and send money to Mexico. The Mexican federal government also issues identity cards to Mexicans living outside of Mexico.

- In 2005, the government of Yucatán produced a handbook and DVD about the risks and implications of crossing the US–Mexico border. The guide told immigrants where to find health care, how to get their kids into U.S. schools, and how to send money home. Officials in Yucatán said the guide is a necessity to save lives, but some American groups accused the government of encouraging illegal immigration.
- Also in 2005, the Mexican government was criticized for distributing a comic book which offers tips to illegal emigrants to the United States. That comic book recommends to illegal immigrants, once they have safely crossed the border, "Don't call attention to yourself. ... Avoid loud parties. ... Don't become involved in fights." The Mexican government defends the guide as an attempt to save lives. "It's kind of like illegal immigration for dummies," said the executive director of the Center for Immigration Studies in Washington, Mark Krikorian. "Promoting safe illegal immigration is not the same as arguing against it". The comic book does state on its last page that the Mexican Government does not promote illegal crossing at all and only encourages visits to the US with all required documentation.

== Legal issues ==
Aliens can be classified as unlawfully present for one of three reasons: entering without authorization or inspection, staying beyond the authorized period after legal entry, or violating the terms of legal entry.

=== Improper entry ===
Title 8 of the United States Code, Chapter 12, Subchapter II, Part VIII, Section 1325, "Improper entry of alien", subsection a, provides for a fine, imprisonment, or both for any non-citizen who:

1. enters or attempts to enter the United States at any time or place other than as designated by immigration agents, or
2. eludes examination or inspection by immigration agents, or
3. attempts to enter or obtains entry to the United States by a willfully false or misleading representation or the willful concealment of a material fact.

Section "1325(a) is a regulatory offense, and thus knowledge of alienage is not an element." The maximum prison term is 6 months for the first offense with a misdemeanor and 2 years for any subsequent offense with a felony. In addition to the above criminal fines and penalties, civil fines may also be imposed. Sections 1325(a) and 1326(a), however, do "not apply to an alien whom the Attorney General admits to the United States under section 1157 of this title." Similarly, Title 8 of the United States Code, Chapter 12, Subchapter II, Part VIII, Section 1326, "Reentry of removed aliens", subsection a, provides for a fine, imprisonment, or both for any non-citizen who:

1. has been denied admission, excluded, deported, or removed or has departed the United States while an order of exclusion, deportation, or removal is outstanding, and thereafter
2. enters, attempts to enter, or is at any time found in, the United States, unless (A) prior to [their] reembarkation [sic] at a place outside the United States or [their] application for admission from foreign contiguous territory, the Attorney General has expressly consented to such alien's reapplying for admission; or (B) with respect to an alien previously denied admission and removed, unless such alien shall establish that [they were] not required to obtain such advance consent under this chapter or any prior Act.

Note that both of these are illegal actions a person can take or may have taken, not a state of being - they refer to (re-)entry into the United States, not existing inside it. SCOTUS ruled in Robinson v California that United States law may only ban acts or codes of conduct, not states of being, pursuant to the Eighth and Fourteenth Amendments.

=== Visa overstay ===
Unlike illegal entry (which is a criminal offense in the United States), it is not a criminal offense for an alien to enter the United States legally and then overstay his or her visa. A visa overstay is a civil violation dealt with through proceedings in immigration court. A 2006 Pew Hispanic Center study showed that some 45% of unauthorized migrants entered the US legally and then remained in the US without authorization following the expiration of their visa. A person who overstays a visa is subject only to the civil penalties of deportation or removal and restrictions for future applications for another US visa; under provisions of Section 212 of the Immigration and Nationality Act, as amended by 1996 legislation, an alien who "voluntarily departs the United States after being unlawfully present for more than 180 consecutive days but less than 1 year" is subject to a three-year bar to readmission to the United States, and an alien who "departs (voluntarily or involuntarily) the United States after being unlawfully present for 1 consecutive year or more" is subject to a ten-year bar to readmission to the United States.

Since 2007, visa overstays have accounted for a larger share of the growth in the illegal immigrant population than illegal border crossings. In 2019, a Center for Migration Studies of New York study found that for the seventh consecutive year, the number of visa overstays significantly surpassed the number of unauthorized border crossings; from 2016 to 2017, "people who overstayed their visas accounted for 62 percent of the newly undocumented, while 38 percent had crossed a border illegally." Some visa overstays occur unwittingly or inadvertently. In other cases, visa-holders enter the United States without the intention to do so, but ultimately decide to do so due to extenuating circumstances, such as dangers in their home countries.

=== Federal versus state role ===
The federal government has primary responsibility for immigration enforcement in the United States. Assistance from state and local police for immigration enforcement has been controversial and legally complicated in various ways. In jurisdictions with majority support for strong immigration enforcement, state and local police often cooperate with federal officials. Some state governments have declared federal enforcement activities insufficient, and attempted to prevent illegal immigration through state law and police. In some jurisdictions where majorities feel federal immigration restrictions are unjust or enforcement actions too harsh, state and local police are prohibited from voluntary cooperation with immigration enforcement agencies. This may include information sharing or acting on ICE detainers. Some jurisdictions prohibit asking about or checking the immigration status of victims, witnesses, or perpetrators, with the goal of encouraging illegal immigrants to report crimes without fear of disproportionate consequences or being deported themselves. Many of these have declared themselves sanctuary cities or states. States have considerable power to make legal residency status a requirement for employment and state services including social safety net programs and higher education. The 1982 US Supreme Court decision Plyler v. Doe ruled that K-12 students cannot be denied an education on the basis of immigration status. Whether or not to issue driver's licenses for illegal immigrants became a high-profile political issue in the 21st century. In April 2010, Arizona passed SB 1070, at the time the broadest and strictest anti-illegal immigration bill in the United States.

The Arizona law was challenged by the Department of Justice as encroaching on powers reserved by the United States Constitution to the Federal Government. In July 2010, a federal district court issued a preliminary injunction affecting the most controversial parts of the law, including the section that required police officers to check a person's immigration status after a person had been involved in another act or situation which resulted in police activity. The case came to the Supreme Court of the United States in Arizona v. United States (2012). The Court unanimously sustained the law's central and most controversial requirement, requiring state law enforcement officials "to determine the immigration status of anyone they stop or arrest if they have reason to suspect that the individual might be in the country illegally"—a clause called the "show me your papers" provision by opponents. The Court indicated that future legal challenges to the provision could still be pursued based on, for example, allegations of racial profiling in the use of the clause. The Court also struck down as unconstitutional, by a 5–3 vote, provisions of the Arizona law making it a criminal offense for illegal immigrants to work or seek employment and permitting police to make warrantless arrests if they had probable cause to believe that the arrestee had done an act that would render him or her deportable under federal law"; and struck down as unconstitutional, by a 6–2 vote, a clause of the Arizona law that made it a state crime for immigrants to fail to register with the federal government. In 2016, Arizona reached a settlement with a number of immigrants rights organizations, including the National Immigration Law Center, overturning the part of the law providing for police to demand papers from persons they suspected of being illegally present in the United States. The practice had led to racial profiling of Latinos and other minorities. The Los Angeles Times reported that the settlement "pulls the last set of teeth from what was once the nation's most fearsome immigration law."

States do have the police power to control movement across their borders and set up border checkpoints, as with weigh stations, California Border Protection Stations, and highway checkpoints set up during the COVID-19 pandemic in Rhode Island. Texas governor Greg Abbott used this power in various ways under Operation Lone Star, targeting illegal entries across the Mexico border. Texas authorities have arrested illegal immigrants on state charges for offenses such as criminal trespass on private land and human smuggling. They began building or enhancing border walls and other physical deterrents, sometimes with negative consequences for migrant safety or the environment, which generated lawsuits. In April 2022, Abbott ordered state authorities to inspect commercial vehicles entering from Mexico (which had already passed US customs inspection) for illegal cargo and passengers. This caused massive traffic backups and had to be abandoned shortly thereafter, without having made any seizures or arrests. A standoff at Eagle Pass began in January 2024 when the governor ordered the Texas National Guard seized control of a park and refused entry to federal border control agents. Abbott and Arizona governor Doug Ducey have arranged for buses to transport migrants released from federal custody to pro-sanctuary cities or even the homes of prominent liberal politicians, without coordinating with local officials and sometimes overwhelming local support services. At times, federal, state, and private facilities along the southern border have also become overwhelmed. Florida governor Ron DeSantis even once arranged to airlift of migrants to Martha's Vineyard, a wealthy island in liberal Massachusetts.

=== Employment ===
Illegal immigrants are generally not allowed to receive state or local public benefits, which includes professional licenses. However, in 2013 the California State Legislature passed laws allowing illegal immigrants to obtain professional licenses. On February 1, 2014. Sergio C. Garcia became the first illegal immigrant to be admitted to the State Bar of California since 2008, when applicants were first required to list citizenship status on bar applications.

=== E-Verify ===
As of 2015, red states required E-Verify for most public employers, blue states required E-Verify for some public contractors and subcontractors, and yellow required E-Verify for all employers.

E-Verify is a United States Department of Homeland Security (DHS) website that allows businesses to determine the eligibility of their employees, both US and foreign citizens, to work in the United States. No federal law mandates use of E-Verify. Research shows that E-Verify harms the labor market outcomes of illegal immigrants and improves the labor market outcomes of Mexican legal immigrants and US-born Hispanics, but has no impact on labor market outcomes for non-Hispanic Americans. A 2016 study suggests that E-Verify reduces the number of illegal immigrants in states that have mandated use of E-Verify for all employers, and further notes that the program may deter illegal immigration to the United States in general.

=== Apprehension ===
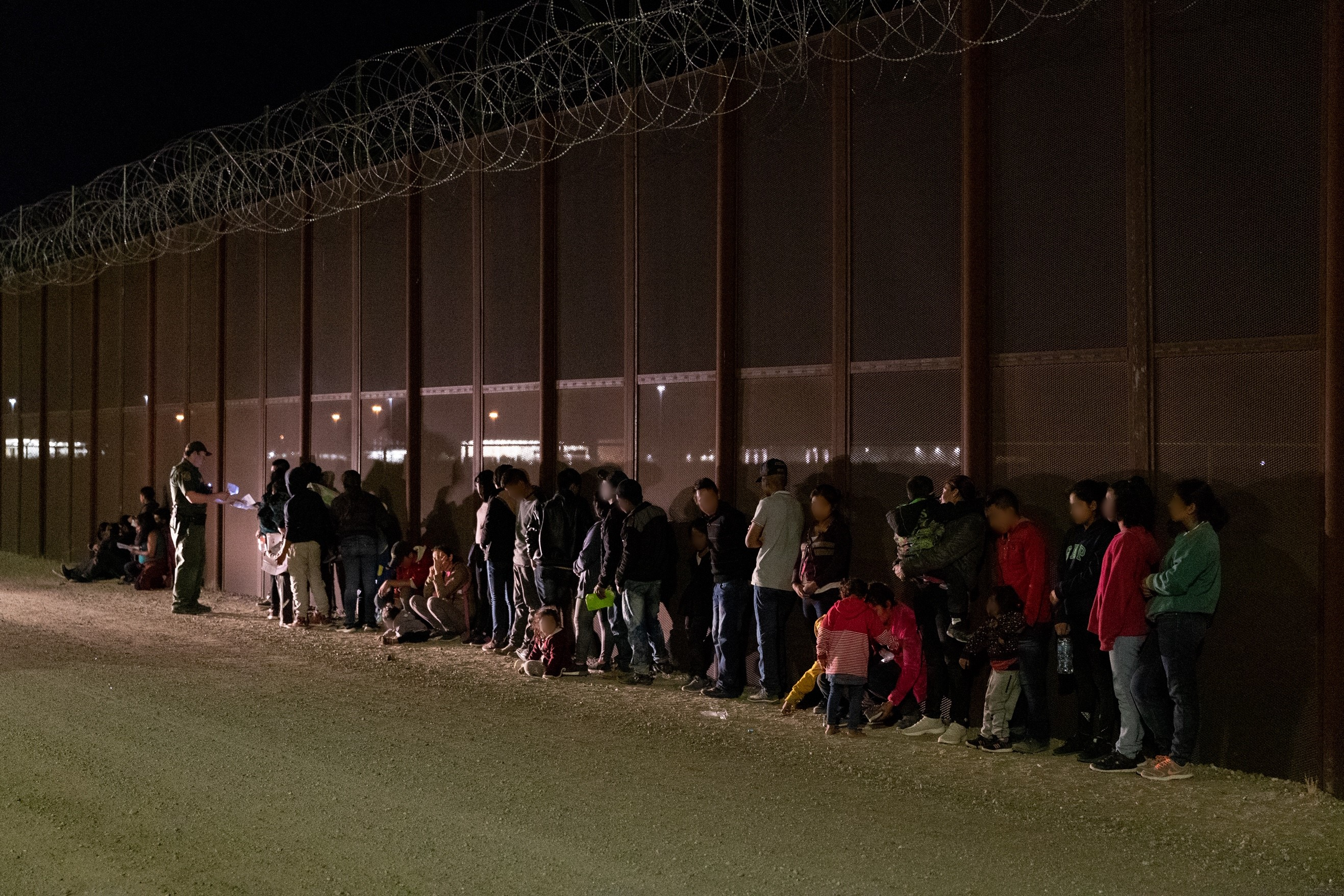
US Border Patrol agents review documents of individuals suspected of attempted illegal entry in 2019.

Federal law enforcement agencies, specifically US Immigration and Customs Enforcement (ICE), the United States Border Patrol (USBP), and US Customs and Border Protection (CBP), enforce the Immigration and Nationality Act of 1952 (INA), and to some extent, the United States Armed Forces, state and local law enforcement agencies, and civilians and civilian groups guard the border.

==== At workplace ====
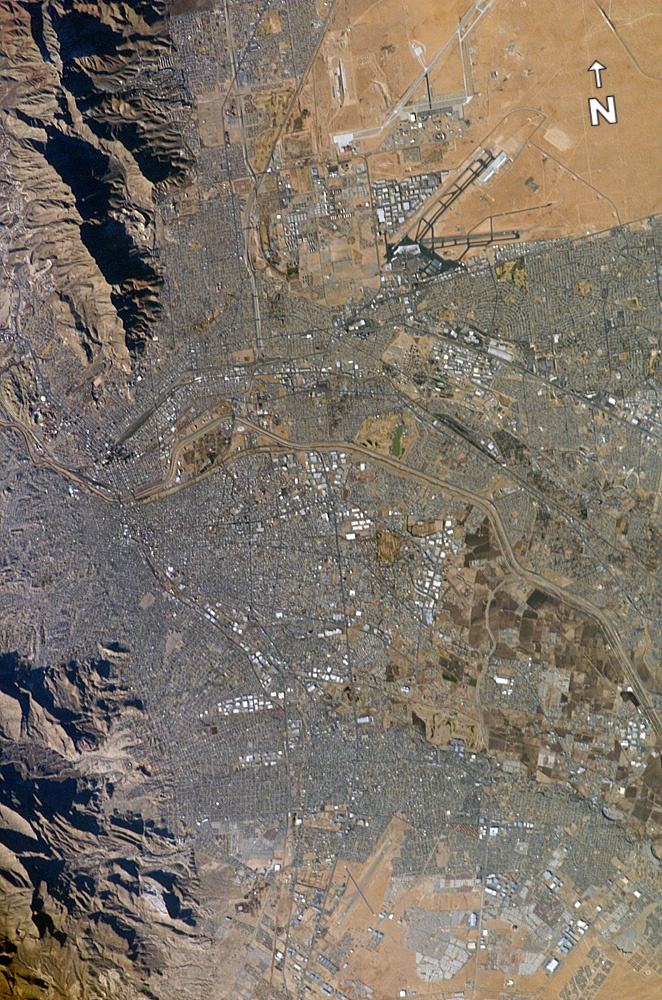
El Paso (top) and Ciudad Juárez (bottom) seen from earth orbit; the Rio Grande is the thin line separating the two cities through the middle of the photograph.

Before 2007, immigration authorities alerted employers of mismatches between reported employees' Social Security cards and the actual names of the card holders. In September 2007, a federal judge halted this practice of alerting employers of card mismatches. At times. illegal hiring has not been prosecuted aggressively. According to The Washington Post, between 1999 and 2003, "work-site enforcement operations were scaled back 95 percent by the Immigration and Naturalization Service.

Major employers of illegal immigrants included Walmart, Swift & Co., Tyson Foods, and Gebbers Farms. In 2005, Walmart agreed to pay $11 million to settle a federal investigation that found hundreds of illegal immigrants were hired by Walmart's cleaning contractors. In December 2006, in the largest such crackdown in American history, US federal immigration authorities raided Swift & Co. meat-processing plants in six US states, arresting about 1,300 illegal immigrant employees. Tyson Foods was accused of actively importing illegal labor for its chicken packing plants; at trial, the jury acquitted the company after evidence was presented that Tyson went beyond mandated government requirements in demanding documentation for its employees. In December 2009, US immigration authorities forced this Brewster, Washington, farm known for its fruit orchards to fire more than 500 illegal workers, mostly immigrants from Mexico. Some were working with false social security cards and other false identification.

=== Detention ===
About 31,000 people who are not US citizens are held in immigration detention on any given day, including children, in over 200 detention centers, jails, and prisons nationwide. The United States government held more than 300,000 people in immigration detention in 2007 while deciding whether to deport them.

=== Deportation ===
History of immigration enforcement actions, raw numbers as reported by the U.S. Department of Homeland Security

As a percent of US population, recent figures for enforcement actions are similar to those in several past decades.

Expulsions under 42 U.S.C. 265 (Title 42 expulsions) from the southwest U.S. border

Deportations of immigrants, which are also referred to as removals, may be issued when immigrants are found to be in violation of US immigration laws. Deportations may be imposed on a person who is neither native-born nor a naturalized citizen of the United States. Deportation proceedings are also referred to as removal proceedings and are typically initiated by the Department of Homeland Security. The United States issues deportations for various reasons which include security, protection of resources, and protection of jobs. Deportations from the United States increased by more than 60 percent from 2003 to 2008, with Mexicans accounting for nearly two-thirds of those deported.

Under the Obama administration, deportations have increased to record levels beyond the level reached by the George W. Bush administration with a projected 400,000 deportations in 2010, 10 percent above the deportation rate of 2008 and 25 percent above 2007. Fiscal year 2011 saw 396,906 deportations, the largest number in the history of US Immigration and Customs Enforcement; of those, about 55% had been convicted of crimes or misdemeanors, including: 44,653 convicted of drug-related crimes, 35,927 convicted of driving under the influence, 5,848 convicted of sexual offenses, and 1,119 convicted of homicide. By the end of 2012, as many people had been deported during the first four years of the Obama presidency as were deported during the eight-year presidency of George W. Bush; the number of deportations under Obama totalled 2.5 million by the end of 2015.

==== AEDPA and IIRIRA Acts of 1996 ====
Two major pieces of legislation passed in 1996 had a significant effect on illegal immigration and deportations in the United States: the Antiterrorism and Effective Death Penalty Act (AEDPA) and the Illegal Immigration Reform and Immigrant Responsibility Act (IIRIRA). These were introduced following the 1993 World Trade Center bombing and the 1995 Oklahoma City bombing, both of which were terrorist attacks that claimed American lives. These two acts changed the way criminal cases of lawful permanent residents were handled, resulting in increased deportations from the United States.

Before the 1996 deportation laws, there were two steps that lawful permanent noncitizen residents who were convicted of crimes went through. The first step determined whether or not the person was deportable. The second step determined if that person should or should not be deported. Before the 1996 deportation laws, the second step prevented many permanent residents from being deported by allowing for their cases to be reviewed in full before issuing deportations. External factors were taken into consideration such as the effect deportation would have on a person's family members and a person's connections with their country of origin. Under this system permanent residents were able to be relieved of deportation if their situation deemed it unnecessary. The 1996 laws issued many deportations under the first step, without going through the second step, resulting in a great increase in deportations.

One significant change that resulted from the new laws was the definition of the term aggravated felony. Being convicted of a crime that is categorized as an aggravated felony results in mandatory detention and deportation. The new definition of aggravated felony includes crimes such as shoplifting, which would be a misdemeanor in many states. The new laws have categorized a much wider range of crimes as aggravated felonies. The effect of this has been a large increase in permanent residents facing mandatory deportation from the United States without the opportunity to plea for relief. The 1996 deportation laws have received a lot of criticism for their curtailing of residents' rights.

==== Patriot Act ====
The Patriot Act was passed seven weeks after the terrorist attacks of September 11, 2001. The purpose of the act was to give the government more power to act upon suspicion of terrorist activity. The new governmental powers granted by this act included a significant expansion of the conditions in which illegal immigrants could be deported based on suspicion of terrorist activity. The act gave the government the power to deport individuals based not only on plots or acts of terrorism, but on affiliations with certain organizations. The Secretary of State designated specific organizations foreign terrorist organizations before the USA Patriot Act was implemented. Organizations on this list were deemed dangerous because they were actively involved in terrorist activity. The Patriot Act created a type of organization called designated organizations. The Secretary of State and Attorney General were given the power to designate any organization that supported terrorist activity on any level. The act also allows for deportation based on involvement in undesignated organizations that were deemed suspicious.

Under the USA Patriot Act the Attorney General was granted the power to "certify" illegal immigrants that pose a threat to national security. Once an illegal immigrant is certified they must be taken into custody and face mandatory detention which will result in a criminal charge or release. The Patriot Act has been criticized for violating the Fifth Amendment right to due process. Under the Patriot Act, an illegal immigrant is not granted the opportunity for a hearing before given certification.

==== Complications of birthright citizen children and illegal immigrant parents ====
Complications in deportation efforts ensue when parents are illegal immigrants, but their children are birthright citizens. Federal appellate courts have upheld the refusal by the Immigration and Naturalization Service to stay the deportation of illegal immigrants merely on the grounds that they have US-citizen, minor children. As of 2005, there were some 3.1 million United States citizen children living in families in which the head of the family or a spouse was an illegal immigrant; at least 13,000 children had one or both parents deported in the years 2005–2007.

=== DREAM Act ===
The DREAM Act (acronym for Development, Relief, and Education for Alien Minors) was an American legislative proposal for a multi-phase process targeting "unauthorized immigrants who came to the country at a young age" that would first grant conditional residency and upon meeting further qualifications, permanent residency. The bill was first introduced in the Senate on August 1, 2001, and has since been reintroduced several times but did not pass. It was intended to stop the deportation of people who had arrived as children and had grown up in the US. The Act would give lawful permanent residency under certain conditions which include: good moral character, enrollment in a secondary or post-secondary education program, and having lived in the United States at least 5 years. Those in opposition of the DREAM Act believe that it encourages illegal immigration.

Although the DREAM Act has not been enacted by federal legislation, a number of its provisions were implemented by a memorandum issued by Janet Napolitano of the Department of Homeland Security during the Obama administration. To be eligible for Deferred Action for Childhood Arrivals (DACA), one must show that they were under 31 years of age as of June 15, 2012; that they came to the United States before their 16th birthday; that they have continuously resided in the United States from June 15, 2007, until the present; that they were physically present in the United States on June 15, 2012, and at the time they applied for DACA; that they were not authorized to be in the United States on June 15, 2012; that they are currently in school, have graduated or obtained a certificate of completion from high school, have obtained a general education development (GED) certificate, or are an honorably discharged veteran of the Coast Guard or Armed Forces of the United States; and that they have not been convicted of a felony, significant misdemeanor, three or more other misdemeanors, and do not otherwise pose a threat to national security or public safety.

=== Deportation trends ===
==== 20th century ====
There have been two major periods of mass deportations in US history. In the Mexican Repatriation of the 1930s, through mass deportations and forced migration, an estimated 500,000 Mexicans and Mexican Americans were deported or coerced into emigrating, in what Mae Ngai, an immigration historian at the University of Chicago, has described as "a racial removal program". The majority of those removed were US citizens. Rep. Luis Gutierrez, D-Ill., cosponsor of a US House Bill that calls for a commission to study the "deportation and coerced emigration" of US citizens and legal residents, has expressed concerns that history could repeat itself, and that should illegal immigration be made into a felony, this could prompt a "massive deportation of US citizens".

In Operation Wetback in 1954, the United States and the Mexican governments cooperated to deport illegal immigrant Mexicans in the US to Mexico. This cooperation was part of more harmonious Mexico–United States relations starting in World War II. Joint border policing operations were established in the 1940s when the Bracero Program (1942–1964) brought qualified Mexicans to the US as guest workers. Many Mexicans who did not qualify for the program migrated illegally. According to Mexican law, Mexican workers needed authorization to accept employment in the US. As Mexico industrialized post-World War II in what was called the Mexican Miracle, Mexico wanted to preserve "one of its greatest natural resources, a cheap and flexible labor supply." Some illegal immigrants, in some cases along with their US born children (who are citizens according to US law), fearful of potential violence as police swarmed through Mexican American barrios throughout the southeastern states, stopping "Mexican-looking" citizens on the street and asking for identification, fled to Mexico.

In 1986, President Ronald Reagan signed the Immigration Reform and Control Act that gave amnesty to 3 million illegal immigrants in the country. A direct effect of the deportation laws of 1996 and the Patriot Act has been a dramatic increase in deportations. Prior to these acts deportations had remained at about an average of 20,000 per year. Between 1990 and 1995 deportations had increased to about an average of 40,000 a year. From 1996 to 2005 the yearly average had increased to over 180,000. In the year 2005 the number of deportations reached 208,521 with less than half being deported under criminal grounds. According to a June 2013 report published by the Washington Office on Latin America, dangerous deportation practices are on the rise and pose a serious threat to the safety of the migrants being deported. These practices include repatriating migrants to border cities with high levels of drug-related violence and criminal activity, night deportations (approximately 1 in 5 migrants reports being deported between the hours of 10 pm and 5 am), and "lateral repatriations", or the practice of moving migrants from the region where they were detained to areas hundreds of miles away. These practices increase the risk of gangs and organized criminal groups preying upon the newly arrived migrants.

==== 21st century ====
In 2013, deportation prioritization guidance used by Immigration and Customs enforcement, was extended to Customs and Border Protection, under the Obama Administration's prosecutorial discretion plan. Under the Obama administration, removals peaked in fiscal year (FY) 2012, when 409,849 persons were removed (about 55% of whom had a criminal conviction, with some additional number with a pending criminal charge). and FY 2013, when 438,421 persons were removed. Deportations thereafter declined while still remaining high: there were 414,481 deportations in FY 2014, 235,413 deportations in FY 2015, 240,255 deportations in FY 2016. Under the Trump administration, deportations rose but remained lower than the Obama-era peaks. There were 226,119 deportations in fiscal year 2017, and 256,085 deportations in FY 2018. In Obama's first three years in office, around 1.18 million people were deported, while around 800,000 deportations took place under Trump in his three years of presidency. In the final year of his presidency, Trump deported an additional 186,000 illegal immigrants, bringing his total to just under 1 million for his full presidency.

A study in 2005 by the Center for American Progress, a liberal think tank, estimated that the cost of forcibly removing most of the nation's illegal immigrants (then estimated to be about 10 million) would be $41 billion a year, more than the entire annual budget of the US Department of Homeland Security. The study estimated that the cost over five years would be between $206 billion to $230 billion, depending on how many departed voluntarily. A 2017 study published in the Journal on Migration and Human Security found that a mass-deportation program would create immense social and economic costs, including a cumulative GDP reduction of $4.7 trillion over a decade; damage to the US housing market (because an estimated 1.2 million mortgages are held by households that include one or more illegal immigrants); and a 47% drop in the median household income for the US's estimated 3.3 million "mixed-status" households (household that include at least one illegal immigrant and at least one US citizen), which would result in a major increase in poverty.

=== Military involvement ===
In 1995, the United States Congress considered an exemption from the Posse Comitatus Act, which generally prohibits direct participation of US soldiers and airmen (and sailors and marines by policy of the Department of the Navy) in domestic law enforcement activities, such as search, seizure, and arrests. In 1997, marines shot and killed 18-year-old US citizen Esequiel Hernández Jr while on a mission to interdict smuggling and illegal immigration near the border community of Redford, Texas. The marines observed the high school student from concealment while he was tending his family's goats in the vicinity of their ranch. At one point, Hernandez raised his .22-caliber rifle and fired shots in the direction of the concealed soldiers. He was subsequently tracked for 20 minutes then shot and killed. In reference to the incident, military lawyer Craig T. Trebilcock argues, "the fact that armed military troops were placed in a position with the mere possibility that they would have to use force to subdue civilian criminal activity reflects a significant policy shift by the executive branch away from the posse comitatus doctrine." The killing of Hernandez led to a congressional review and an end to a nine-year-old policy of the military aiding the Border Patrol.

After the September 11 attacks in 2001, the United States again considered placing soldiers along the U.S.-Mexico Border as a security measure. In May 2006, President George W. Bush announced plans to use the National Guard to strengthen enforcement of the US–Mexico border from illegal immigrants, emphasizing that Guard units "will not be involved in direct law enforcement activities". The American Civil Liberties Union (ACLU) called on the President not to deploy troops to deter illegal immigrants, and stated that a "deployment of National Guard troops violates the spirit of the Posse Comitatus Act". According to the State of the Union address in January 2007, more than 6,000 National Guard members had been sent to the border to supplement the Border Patrol, costing in excess of $750 million.

=== Sanctuary cities ===
Sanctuary cities in the United States (February 2017) State has legislation in place that establishes a statewide sanctuary for illegal immigrants County or county equivalent either contains a municipality that is a sanctuary for illegal immigrants, or is one itself All county jails in the state do not honor ICE detainers Alongside statewide legislation or policies establishing sanctuary for illegal immigrants, county contains a municipality that has policy or has taken action to further provide sanctuary to illegal immigrants *Map is based on data published by ICE in a February 2017 report outlining jurisdictions that have declined ICE detainers.

A map of US states colored by their policy on sanctuary cities. States colored red have banned sanctuary cities statewide. States highlighted in blue are pro-sanctuary states, whereas states colored gray are unknown to be either a pro- or anti-sanctuary state.

Several US cities have instructed their own law enforcement personnel and civilian employees not to notify the federal government when they become aware of illegal immigrants living within their jurisdiction. There is no official definition of "sanctuary city". Cities which have been referred to as "sanctuary cities" by various politicians include Washington, D.C.; New York City; Los Angeles; Chicago; San Francisco; San Diego; Austin; Salt Lake City; Dallas; Detroit; Honolulu; Houston; Jersey City; Minneapolis; Miami; Newark; Denver; Aurora, Colorado; Baltimore; Seattle; Portland, Oregon; and Portland, Maine have become "sanctuary cities", having adopted ordinances refraining from stopping or questioning individuals for the sole purpose of determining their immigration status. Most of these ordinances are in place at the state and county, not city, level. These policies do not prevent the local authorities from investigating crimes committed by illegal immigrants. In 2020, armed federal officers from CBP were to be sent to sanctuary cities across the country to perform routine immigration arrests.

=== Attacks on immigrants ===
According to a 2006 report by the Anti-Defamation League, white supremacists and other extremists were engaging in a growing number of assaults against legal and illegal immigrants and those perceived to be immigrants, including assault on migrants from Latin America.

=== Community-based involvement ===
The No More Deaths organization offers food, water, and medical aid to migrants crossing the desert regions of the American Southwest in an effort to reduce the increasing number of deaths along the border. In 2014, "Dreamer Moms" began protesting, hoping that President Obama will grant them legal status. On November 12, 2014, there was a hunger strike near the White House undertaken by the group Dreamer Moms. On November 21, 2014, Obama provided 5 million illegal immigrants legal status because he said that mass deportation "would be both impossible and contrary to our character." However, this decision was challenged in court during the Trump administration and then overturned. Other organizations and initiatives offer support to populations of illegal immigrants within the United States, such as Kichwa Hatari, a radio station in New York City that translates information from Spanish into the Kichwa language for broadcast to Ecuadorian illegal immigrants.

== Economic impact ==
Immigrants without a legal citizenship or residency increase the size of the US economy and contribute to economic growth. Unauthorized immigrant workers contribute to lower prices of US-produced goods and services, which benefits consumers. Economists estimate that legalization of the current unauthorized immigrant population would increase the immigrants' earnings and consumption considerably. A 2016 National Bureau of Economic Research paper found that "legalization would increase the economic contribution of the unauthorized population by about 20%, to 3.6% of private-sector GDP." Legalization is also likely to reduce untaxed labor in the informal economy.

A 2016 study found that Deferred Action for Childhood Arrivals (DACA), which allows unauthorized immigrants who migrated to the United States as minors to temporarily stay, increases labor force participation, decreases the unemployment rate and increases the income for DACA-eligible immigrants. The study estimated that DACA moved 50,000 to 75,000 unauthorized immigrants into employment. Another 2016 study found that DACA-eligible households were 38% less likely than non-eligible unauthorized immigrant households to live in poverty. A 2017 study in the Journal of Public Economics found that more intense immigration enforcement increased the likelihood that US-born children with illegal immigrant parents would live in poverty.

=== Native welfare ===
A number of studies have shown that illegal immigration increases the welfare of natives. A 2015 study found that "increasing deportation rates and tightening border control weakens low-skilled labor markets, increasing unemployment of native low-skilled workers. Legalization, instead, decreases the unemployment rate of low-skilled natives and increases income per native." A study by economist Giovanni Peri concluded that between 1990 and 2004, immigrant workers raised the wages of native born workers in general by 4%, while more recent immigrants suppressed wages of previous immigrants. In a 2017 literature review by the National Academy of Sciences, they explain the positive impact of illegal immigrants on natives in the following way:

The entry of new workers through migration increases the likelihood of filling a vacant position quickly and thus reduces the net cost of posting new offers. The fact that immigrants in each skill category earn less than natives reinforces this effect. Though immigrants compete with natives for these additional jobs, the overall number of new positions employers choose to create is larger than the number of additional entrants to the labor market. The effect is to lower the unemployment rate and to strengthen the bargaining position of workers.

According to Georgetown University economist Anna Maria Mayda and University of California, Davis economist Giovanni Peri, "deportation of undocumented immigrants not only threatens the day-to-day life of several million people, it also undermines the economic viability of entire sectors of the US economy." Research shows that illegal immigrants complement and extend middle- and high-skilled American workers, making it possible for those sectors to employ more Americans. Without access to illegal immigrants, US firms would be incentivized to offshore jobs and import foreign-produced goods. Several highly competitive sectors that depend disproportionately on illegal immigrant labor, such as agriculture, would dramatically shrink and sectors, such as hospitality and food services, would see higher prices for consumers. Regions and cities that have large illegal populations are also likely to see harms to the local economy were the illegal immigrant population removed. While Mayda and Peri note that some low-skilled American workers would see marginal gains, it is likely that the effects on net job creation and wages would be negative for the US as a whole.

A 2002 study of the effects of illegal immigration and border enforcement on wages in border communities from 1990 to 1997 found little impact of border enforcement on wages in US border cities, and concluded that their findings were consistent with two hypotheses, "border enforcement has a minimal impact on illegal immigration, and illegal immigration from Mexico has a minimal impact on wages in US border cities". A 2021 study in the American Economic Journal found that illegal immigrants had beneficial effects on the employment and wages of American natives. Stricter immigration enforcement adversely affected employment and wages of American natives. According to University of California, San Diego economist Gordon H. Hanson, "there is little evidence that legal immigration is economically preferable to illegal immigration. In fact, illegal immigration responds to market forces in ways that legal immigration does not. Illegal migrants tend to arrive in larger numbers when the US economy is booming (relative to Mexico and the Central American countries that are the source of most illegal immigration to the United States) and move to regions where job growth is strong. Legal immigration, in contrast, is subject to arbitrary selection criteria and bureaucratic delays, which tend to disassociate legal inflows from US labor-market conditions. Over the last half-century, there appears to be little or no response of legal immigration to the US unemployment rate."

=== Fiscal effects ===
Since the enactment of the Revenue Act of 1913, the US federal government has subjected noncitizens residing in the country to income tax in the same manner as US citizens, the Internal Revenue Code of 1986, further establishing the definition of 'resident alien' for tax purposes, these taxpayers contributing more in taxes than they cost in social services as demonstrated in the peer-reviewed journal Tax Lawyer from the American Bar Association These taxpayers are not eligible for most federally-funded safety net programs, and pay more in taxes than similar low-income groups because they are not eligible for the federal earned income tax credit. They are barred from receiving benefits from Medicare, non-emergency Medicaid, or the Children's Health Insurance Program (CHIP), and the Medicare program; they also cannot participate in health insurance marketplaces and are not eligible to receive insurance subsidies under the Affordable Care Act. Undocumented workers contribute up to $12 billion annually to the Social Security Trust Fund, but are not eligible to receive any Social Security benefits. Unless the illegal immigrants transition to legal status, they will not collect these benefits. According to a 2007 literature review by the Congressional Budget Office, "Over the past two decades, most efforts to estimate the fiscal impact of immigration in the United States have concluded that, in aggregate and over the long term, tax revenues of all types generated by immigrants—both legal and unauthorized—exceed the cost of the services they use."

While the aggregate fiscal effects are beneficial to the United States, unauthorized immigration has small but net negative fiscal effects on state and local governments. According to the 2017 National Academy of Science report on immigration, one reason for the adverse fiscal impact on state and local governments is that "the federal government reimburses state and local entities a fraction of costs to incarcerate criminal aliens, the remaining costs are borne by local governments." A 2016 study found that, over the period 2000–2011, illegal immigrants contributed $2.2 to $3.8 billion more to the Medicare Trust Fund "than they withdrew annually (a total surplus of $35.1 billion). Had unauthorized immigrants neither contributed to nor withdrawn from the Trust Fund during those 11 years, it would become insolvent in 2029—1 year earlier than currently predicted."

=== Mortgages ===
Around 2005, an increasing number of banks saw illegal immigrants as an untapped resource for growing their own revenue stream and contended that providing illegal immigrants with mortgages would help revitalize local communities, with many community banks providing home loans for illegal immigrants. At the time, critics complained that this practice would reward and encourage illegal immigration, as well as contribute to an increase in predatory lending practices. One banking consultant said that banks which were planning to offer mortgages to illegal immigrants were counting on the fact that immigration enforcement was very lax, with deportation unlikely for anyone who had not committed a crime.

== Crime and law enforcement ==
=== Relationship between illegal immigration and crime ===
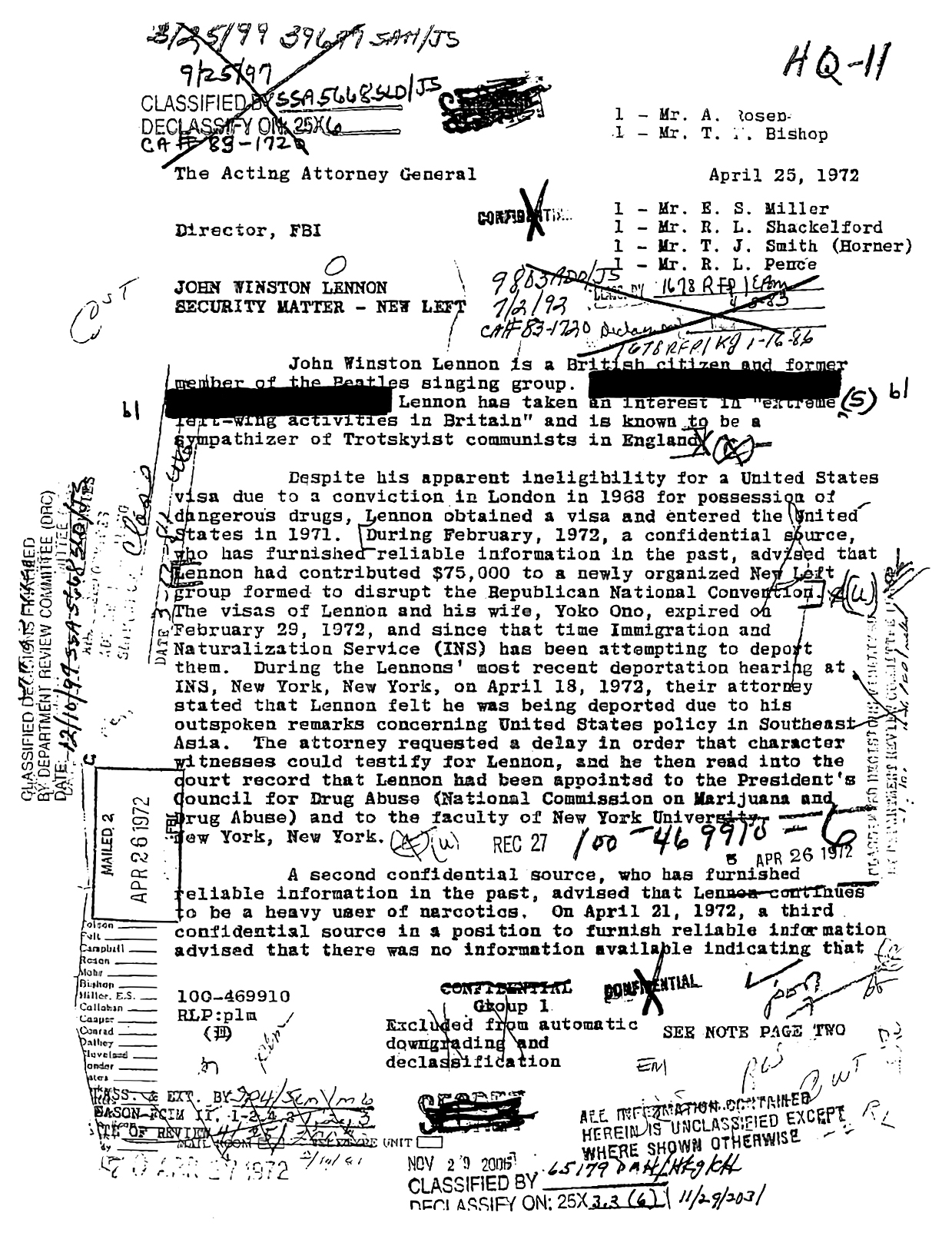
A 1972 FBI report on prior drug convictions of an immigrant issued a visa

Illegal immigrants are less likely to commit crimes than native-born citizens in the United States. Multiple studies have found that illegal immigration to the United States did not increase violent crime. A 2016 study found no link between illegal immigrant populations and violent crime, although there is a small but significant association between illegal immigrants and drug-related crime. A 2017 study found that "Increased undocumented immigration was significantly associated with reductions in drug arrests, drug overdose deaths, and DUI arrests, net of other factors." A 2017 study found that California's extension of driving licenses to unauthorized immigrants "did not increase the total number of accidents or the occurrence of fatal accidents, but it did reduce the likelihood of hit and run accidents, thereby improving traffic safety and reducing costs for California drivers ... providing unauthorized immigrants with access to driver's licenses can create positive externalities for the communities in which they live."

A 2018 study in the American Economic Journal: Economic Policy found that by restricting the employment opportunities for unauthorized immigrants, the Immigration Reform and Control Act of 1986 (IRCA) likely caused an increase in crime. A 2018 PLOS One study estimated that the illegal immigrant population in the United States was 22 million (approximately twice as large as the estimate derived from US Census Bureau figures); an author of the study notes that this has implications for the relationship between illegal immigration and crime suggesting the correlation is lower than previously estimated: "You have the same number of crimes but now spread over twice as many people as was believed before, which right away means that the crime rate among undocumented immigrants is essentially half whatever was previously believed." A 2019 analysis found no evidence that illegal immigration increased crime. A 2020 study found little evidence of a relationship between unauthorized immigration and terrorism.

=== Impact of immigration enforcement ===
Research suggests immigration enforcement deters unauthorized immigration but has no impact on crime rates. Immigration enforcement is costly and may divert resources from other forms of law enforcement. Tougher immigration enforcement has been associated with greater migrant deaths, as migrants take riskier routes and use the services of smugglers. Tough border enforcement may also encourage unauthorized immigrants to settle in the United States, rather than regularly travel across the border where they may be captured. Immigration enforcement programs have been shown to lower employment and wages among illegal immigrants, while increasing their participation in the informal economy.

Research finds that Secure Communities, an immigration enforcement program which led to a quarter of a million of detentions, had no observable impact on the crime rate. A 2015 study found that the 1986 Immigration Reform and Control Act, which legalized almost 3 million immigrants, led to "decreases in crime of 3–5 percent, primarily due to decline in property crimes, equivalent to 120,000–180,000 fewer violent and property crimes committed each year due to legalization".

A 2017 review study of the existing literature noted that the existing studies had found that sanctuary cities—which adopt policies designed to avoid prosecuting people solely for being an illegal immigrant—either have no impact on crime or that they lower the crime rate. A second 2017 study in the journal Urban Affairs Review found that sanctuary policy itself has no statistically meaningful effect on crime. The findings of the study were misinterpreted by Attorney General Jeff Sessions in a July 2017 speech when he claimed that the study showed that sanctuary cities were more prone to crime than cities without sanctuary policies. A third study in the journal Justice Quarterly found evidence that the adoption of sanctuary policies reduced the robbery rate but had no impact on the homicide rate except in cities with larger Mexican illegal immigrant populations which had lower rates of homicide. Two studies have found that local cooperation with ICE adversely affect public safety by reducing local reporting of crime by Latino communities.

According to a study by Tom K. Wong, associate professor of political science at the University of California, San Diego, published by the Center for American Progress, a progressive think tank: "Crime is statistically significantly lower in sanctuary counties compared to nonsanctuary counties. Moreover, economies are stronger in sanctuary counties—from higher median household income, less poverty, and less reliance on public assistance to higher labor force participation, higher employment-to-population ratios, and lower unemployment." The study also concluded that sanctuary cities build trust between local law enforcement and the community, which enhances public safety overall. The study evaluated sanctuary and non-sanctuary cities while controlling for differences in population, the foreign-born percentage of the population, and the percentage of the population that is Latino." A 2018 study found no evidence that apprehensions of illegal immigrants in districts in the United States reduced crime rates.

After the Obama administration reduced federal immigration enforcement, Democratic counties reduced their immigration enforcement more than Republican counties; a paper by a University of Pennsylvania PhD candidate found "that Democratic counties with higher non-citizen population shares saw greater increases in clearance rates, a measure of policing efficiency, with no increase in crime rates. The results indicate that reducing immigration enforcement did not increase crime and rather led to an increase in policing efficiency, either because it allowed police to focus efforts on solving more serious crimes or because it elicited greater cooperation of non-citizens with police." A 2003 paper by two Federal Reserve Bank of Dallas economists found "that while the volume of illegal immigration is not related to changes in property-related crime, there is a significant positive correlation with the incidence of violent crime. This is most likely due to extensive smuggling activity along the border. Border enforcement meanwhile is significantly negatively related to crime rates. The bad news is that the deterrent effect of the border patrol diminishes over this time period, and the net impact of more enforcement on border crime since the late 1990s is zero."

According to Cornell University economist Francine Blau and University of California at Berkeley economist Gretchen Donehower, the existing "evidence does not suggest that ... stepping up enforcement of existing immigration laws would generate savings to existing taxpayers." By complicating circular migration and temporary work by migrants, and by incentivizing migrants to settle permanently in the US, the 2017 National Academy of Sciences report on immigration notes that "it is certainly possible that additional costs have been created to the economy by the increased border enforcement, beyond the narrow costs of the programs themselves in the federal budget."

It has been argued that enhanced border enforcement drives illegal immigrants to cartels, which have the means to elude immigration authorities, such as trucks, with negative consequences including the rape, torture, and blackmail of the smuggled immigrants, and high profits for the cartels. "The militarization of the border has made it so difficult and so expensive for migrants to cross that the potential profits have incentivized international cartels.... Homeland Security Investigations estimates that cartel profits from smuggling migrants jumped from $500 million in 2018 to $13 billion today [in 2022]."

=== Document fraud ===
Illegal immigrants sometimes use Social Security numbers belonging to others in order to obtain fake work documentation. In 2009, the US Supreme Court ruled in the case of Flores-Figueroa v. United States that illegal immigrants cannot be prosecuted for identity theft if they use "made-up" Social Security numbers that they do not know belong to someone else; to be guilty of identity theft with regard to social security numbers, they must know that the social security numbers that they use belong to others.

== Education ==
Research shows that policies regarding tuition and admissions procedures impact students the most. As of October 2015, twenty states had given undocumented students' in-state resident tuition (ISRT) while five states had completely prohibited their enrollment. Although states grant undocumented students resident tuition, federal laws do not award undocumented immigrants financial aid. Without financial aid, students cannot afford higher education, making it difficult for this community to attain social mobility.

In 1982, Plyler vs Doe granted all students, regardless of status, the right to a public K-12 education. The ruling found that denying undocumented students access to public education outweighed the effects of not educating them, however states continued implementing policies that challenged the Supreme Court decision. In 1994, California implemented Proposition 187, prohibiting undocumented students from enrolling in schools and required educators to report students who they suspected were undocumented. Likewise, the state of Alabama in 2011, requiring administrators to report the status of recently enrolled students; which resulted in a 13% dropout rate that year.

Organizations such as the American Federation of Teachers have created guides for educators of immigrant and refugee students, urging schools to build policies that provide these students with protection from policies that would criminalize them. In 2014, Operation Border Guardians targeted illegal immigrants who had come to the United States as minors and recently turned 18 or were 16 with a criminal history. Federal immigration judges sent out court orders to apprehend students that were not currently appealing their cases. Immigration and Customs Enforcement (ICE) was detaining students on their way to school. When undocumented students turn eighteen, their youth status no longer protects them from immigration policies such as deportation. The National Education Association (NEA) and the National School Board Association (NSBA) in 2009, created guidelines for educators working with undocumented students, informing school personnel about their students' rights concerning immigration legislation as it transpires in the community. The American Federation of Teachers created a guideline specifically speaking to concern regarding deportation.

A case study conducted on Aurora Elementary examined how school personnel quickly developed boundaries to ensure the safety of their students when ICE appeared in the community. The study evaluated how educators' established school policies with limited knowledge regarding policies. In the study, 14 staff members of Aurora spoke about the fear it created in the community. The school was placed on an unofficial lockdown, and no one was to leave campus unless given permission. Days following the event, parents stopped sending their children to school. After speaking to the district's legal department, they informed her that they would not be able to do anything in their part, but that she could call families and inform them about the ICE raids. She worked with school personnel to create school policies that protected the students when immigration legislation transpired in the community. Further, aligning school policies with district goals to ensure that undocumented students' education is protected. Studies have shown that illegal immigrants are wary of disclosing their immigration status to counselors, teachers and mentors. In other words, undocumented students sometimes did not disclose their status to the very individuals that could help them find pathways to higher education.

== Harm to non-citizens without legal status ==
There are significant dangers associated with immigration including potential death when crossing the border. Since the 1994 implementation of an immigration-control effort called Operation Gatekeeper, immigrants have attempted to cross the border in more dangerous locations. Those crossing the border come unprepared, without food, water, proper clothing, or protection from the elements or dangerous animals; sometimes the immigrants are abandoned by those smuggling them. On 1 May 2025, the Inter-American Commission on Human Rights released a report which found the United States responsible for the killing, torture, and deprivation of liberty of Anastasio Hernández-Rojas by U.S. border agents violating articles I, XI, XVII and XXV of the American Declaration of the Rights and Duties of Man. Roxanna Altholz, co-director of UC Berkeley Law's Human Rights Law Clinic and Andrea Guerrero, executive director of Alliance San Diego also pursued border agents who had concealed, destroyed, and tampered with evidence to obstruct the investigation.

According to the US Border Patrol, there were 987 assaults on Border Patrol agents in 2007 and there were a total of 12 people killed by agents in 2007 and 2008. According to the Washington Office on Latin America's Border Fact Check site, Border Patrol rarely investigates allegations of abuse against migrants, and advocacy organizations say, "even serious incidents such as the shootings of migrants result in administrative, not criminal, investigations and sanctions."

=== Health ===
A 2017 Science study found that Deferred Action for Childhood Arrivals (DACA), which allows unauthorized immigrants who migrated to the United States as minors to temporarily stay, led to improved mental health outcomes for the children of DACA-eligible mothers. A 2017 Lancet Public Health study reported found that DACA-eligible individuals had better mental health outcomes as a result of their DACA-eligibility. Stringent immigration enforcement has been linked to worse mental health among Hispanic adolescent residents. Illegal immigrants often encounter challenges when trying to access healthcare because of their financial limitations, risk of deportation, and other difficulties.In addition to the challenges of accessing healthcare, illegal immigrants have higher risks of mental issues related to stress, discrimination, economic worries, and deportation fears.

Undocumented immigrants, particularly those living in parts of the United States with more restrictive policies, are less likely to access health services. If they do see a health care provider, they are less likely to be able to comply with their recommendations. Additionally, undocumented immigrants have higher rates of depressive symptoms than legal immigrants. More restrictive policies also negatively impact the likelihood that a pregnant immigrant will receive prenatal care. In contrast, a 2017 study found that extending Medicaid to unauthorised immigrants led to improvements in infant health and reductions in infant mortality. A quasi-experimental study found that after the Postville raid in Iowa in 2008, newborns were 24% more likely to be underweight at birth compared to the year before, adjusting for maternal risk factors and country of origin.

=== Exploitation by employers ===
Many Mexican immigrants have been trafficked by either their smugglers or the employers after they have gotten to the United States. According to research at San Diego State University, approximately 6% of illegal Mexican immigrants were trafficked by their smugglers while entering the United States and 28% were trafficked by their employers after entering the United States. Trafficking rates were particularly high in the construction and cleaning industries. They also determined that 55% of illegal Mexican immigrants were abused or exploited by either their smugglers or employers.

Indian, Russian, Thai, Vietnamese and Chinese women have been reportedly brought to the United States under false pretenses. "As many as 50,000 people are illicitly trafficked into the United States annually, according to a 1999 CIA study. Once here, they're forced to work as prostitutes, sweatshop laborers, farmhands, and servants in private homes." US authorities call it "a modern form of slavery". Many Latina women have been lured under false pretenses to illegally come to the United States and are instead forced to work as prostitutes catering to the immigrant population. Non-citizen customers without proper documentation that have been detained in prostitution stings are generally deported.

=== Death ===
Many Central American migrants are abducted or killed during their journey. A 2015 estimate suggested that as many as 120,000 migrants had disappeared within Mexico during the previous ten years. Thousands are killed or maimed riding the roofs of cargo trains in Mexico. Death by exposure to the elements—leading to hypothermia, dehydration, heat stroke, drowning, and suffocation—has been reported in the deserts, particularly during the hot summer season. Moreover, people may die or be injured when they attempt to avoid law enforcement, for example in high speed pursuits.

=== Workplace injury ===
Recent studies have found that illegal immigration status is perceived by Latino immigrant workers as a barrier to safety at work.

=== Criticisms of ICE Detention ===
ICE has come under scrutiny for its practices of separating families, including the separation of US citizen children from their parents. ICE has also been wrongfully assessing ages of unaccompanied children. The Department of Homeland Security rely on dental radiograph tests to ascertain the ages of those in custody. But these tests only determine an age range, often encompassing both minor and adult ages, resulting in many minors being placed in adult prisons. "This American Life" has reported on one wrongfully detained migrant arriving from Cambodia to meet her finance, whose dental tests said she was a minor. ICE tests to determine ages of detained migrants have proven at best faulty—and at worst unscientific. Additionally, activists and immigrant advocates have criticized the role of private prison companies in dealing with the detention of immigrants. Reports have detailed people in ICE custody being forced to work for nothing or a dollar-a-day cooking, doing laundry, and other essential tasks for these prisons. In late December 2017, the US Civil Rights Commission called on Congress and the Department of Homeland Security to investigate abusive labor practices of these private prisons, including other reports saying detainees had been paid less than a dollar a day in the facilities "Voluntary Work Program." In the report, the Commission specifically cited private prisons as a main concern, given the financial benefit of low-paid labor being used to "maximize profits."

== Celebrities and influencers ==
Celebrities who perform their normal paid duties may suddenly find themselves working illegally if they travel to the United States. (See § In the workforce.) This has become especially common with the increase in social media influencers. Because they are doing something many do without pay and are traveling with no more equipment than many travelers do every day, they may not be aware that they are breaking the 1986 Immigration Reform and Control Act (IRCA).

== Cultural references ==
A number of films and at least one novel tell stories based on the infamous voyage of the Golden Venture, a ship smuggling people from China that ran aground in New York Harbor in 1993, killing 10 persons. About half of the people were deported, minors were released, and the others obtained asylum at some point. The 1996 film Deadly Voyage treats the perils endured by would-be immigrants attempting to enter the United States illegally. How Democracy Works Now: Twelve Stories is a 12-part documentary film series that examines the American political system through the lens of immigration reform from 2001 to 2007, from filmmaking team Shari Robertson and Michael Camerini. Several films in the series contain a large focus on the issue of illegal immigration in the US and feature advocates from both sides of the debate. Since the debut of the first five films, the series has become an important resource for advocates, policymakers and educators.

== See also ==
- Angel Families
- Canada–United States border
- Illegal immigration to Canada
- Illegal immigration to Mexico
- Immigration reduction in the United States
- Immigration to the United States
- Inequality within immigrant families in the United States
- List of detention sites in the United States (migration-related sites)
- Mexican migration
- Mexico–United States border crisis
- Nativism (politics)
- Office of Victims of Immigration Crime Engagement
- Opposition to immigration
- United States Immigration and Customs Enforcement (ICE), a federal law enforcement agency that enforces United States immigration laws
