= Water station =

Water station may refer to:

- Water stop, a railroad facility for providing water to trains
- Water Station (organization), a California charitable organization
- Water Station, California, a former settlement in the Mojave Desert
