= El inmigrante =

- Directed by: David and John Eckenrode; John Sheedy
- Written by: John Eckenrdoe
- Starring: Jewel Robinson
- Release date: 2005
- Running time: 90 minutes
- Countries: United States; Mexico
- Languages: Spanish; English
- Budget: US$ 45,000

El inmigrante ("The Immigrant") is a 2005 documentary directed and written by brothers David and John Eckenrode along with John Sheedy, about immigrant deaths along the U.S.-Mexico border. The film documents the story of the fatal encounter between Mexican migrant Eusebio de Haro Espinosa and elderly Texan Sam Blackwood, close to Blackwood's property near the international border.

== Cast ==
- The de Haro family
- Brackettville (Texas) community members
- Vigilante border militias in Arizona
- The horseback border patrol in El Paso
- Migrants

== Awards ==
The film won the award of Best Documentary Film at the 2007 Byron Bay International Film Festival.
