= International Migration Review =

- Discipline: Sociology
- Language: English
- Edited by: Jamie Winders

Publication details
- Former name: International Migration Digest
- History: 1964-present
- Publisher: SAGE Publications on behalf of the Center for Migration Studies of New York
- Frequency: Quarterly
- Impact factor: 2.195 (2016)

Standard abbreviations
- ISO 4: Int. Migr. Rev.

Indexing
- ISSN: 0197-9183 (print); 1747-7379 (web)
- JSTOR: intemigrrevi
- OCLC no.: 422028304

Links
- Journal homepage; Online access; Online archive; Journal page at the Center for Migration Studies

International Migration Review is a quarterly peer-reviewed academic journal published by SAGE Publications on behalf of the Center for Migration Studies of New York. The journal was established in 1964 as International Migration Digest. The current editor-in-chief is Jamie Winders, professor of sociology at Syracuse University. The journal covers all aspects of international population movements, including human migration, ethnic group relations, and refugee movements.

According to the Journal Citation Reports, the journal has a 2016 Impact Factor of 2.195 and a five-year Impact Factor of 2.114.

== See also ==
- Human migration
- Migrant literature
- Repatriation
- Return migration
