= No More Deaths =

Humanitarian aid organization for undocumented immigrants near the US-Mexico border

No More Deaths is an advocacy group based in Tucson and Phoenix, Arizona, United States. The group's stated goal is to end the series of fatalities of undocumented immigrants crossing the desert regions near the Mexico–United States border. Volunteers for the organization provide food, water, and medical aid to people crossing the US-Mexico border through the Arizona desert and offer humanitarian aid to people in Mexico who have been deported from the US.

== History ==
No More Deaths was founded in 2004 by area religious leaders, including Catholic bishop Gerald Kicanas, Presbyterian minister John Fife, and leaders of the local Jewish community. The founders felt that there was a need for a constant presence on the border to aid migrants and end the increasing numbers of immigrant deaths. The Pima County Medical Examiner's Office recovered the bodies of an average of 160 migrants per year between 2000 and 2005, up from 14 per year in the 1990s. The founders of No More Deaths cite Operation Gatekeeper as a major cause of the spike in deaths.

The organization was structured as an umbrella group to consolidate and expand upon the humanitarian aid work already being provided by other groups like the Samaritans, Humane Borders, and various faith-based organizations and led by the Unitarian Universalist Church of Tucson. The group began by organizing driving patrols through the Sonoran Desert of Arizona to look for migrants who might be in need of water or medical attention. In the summer of 2004, the group also set up camps called "Arks of the Covenant" to provide a permanent presence during the hottest months of summer. The camps are staffed with volunteers who go on daily driving and foot patrols in areas known to be used by undocumented immigrants.

== Projects ==
=== Migrant centers ===
No More Deaths volunteers staff migrant centers in northern Mexico to provide aid to undocumented immigrants who have recently been deported or repatriated by the Border Patrol. The centers are located in Nogales and Agua Prieta, Sonora, just across the border from Nogales and Douglas, Arizona, respectively. Members of No More Deaths and the immigrant rights group Coalición de Derechos Humanos/Alianza Indígena Sin Fronteras signed an "agreement of hospitality" with the Mexican government in July 2006 that allows the groups to provide aid to migrants on the Mexican side of the border.

=== Compiling human rights violations ===
No More Deaths trains volunteers to document human rights violations by immigration officials. The group has noted that it often encounters migrants who have been denied food, water, and medical attention, have been separated from family members, and have suffered physical, emotional, or sexual abuse.

== Prosecution of No More Deaths volunteers ==
=== Daniel Strauss and Shanti Sellz ===
On July 9, 2005, two No More Deaths volunteers, Daniel Strauss and Shanti Sellz, were arrested by a Border Patrol agent while transporting three immigrants from the Arivaca "Ark" to Tucson for medical attention. The migrants were allegedly suffering from severe thirst and hunger due to vomiting as well as blisters that prevented them from walking. Sellz and Strauss were charged with transporting migrants and conspiring to transport migrants, both felonies under US federal law. If convicted, they would have each faced up to 15 years in prison and a $500,000 fine. Lawyers for the defendants argued that the aid workers were not transporting the immigrants "in furtherance" of their being in the country illegally, and therefore were not guilty of smuggling. US Magistrate Bernardo P. Velasco disagreed and refused to dismiss the case.

No More Deaths responded with a campaign called "Humanitarian Aid is Never a Crime" to raise awareness about the case and persuade Judge Raner C. Collins to overrule Velasco and drop all charges. They distributed hundreds of bumper stickers and yard signs to supporters, and over 5,600 people (including the Episcopal Bishop of Arizona) signed a petition in support of the two humanitarian aid workers.

Judge Collins dismissed all of the charges against Sellz and Strauss on September 1, 2006. The judge stated that at the time of their arrest, the two volunteers were following a protocol that had been previously established by the US Border Patrol and No More Deaths. Judge Collins stated that Sellz and Strauss had made an effort to ensure that their actions were lawful, and that “further prosecution would violate the Defendants’ due process rights.”

On April 22, 2007, Sellz and Strauss were awarded the Óscar Romero Award for Human Rights for their work with No More Deaths. The $20,000 award, presented by the Rothko Chapel in Houston, Texas, is "presented periodically to persons or organizations who distinguish themselves by their courage and integrity in defense of human rights." The two human rights workers each accepted $5,000 and gave the remaining $10,000 to No More Deaths.

=== Daniel Millis ===
On September 3, 2010, the littering conviction of Daniel Millis, for leaving water bottles in 2008 for immigrants crossing through a desert wildlife preserve was overturned by a 2-1 appeals court decision.

=== Scott Warren ===
In 2018 migrants were in the news as President Trump threatened to send the U.S. military to close the border and stop the Central American migrant caravans.

In January 2018, Scott Warren, a volunteer with No More Deaths, was arrested and charged with a felony for harboring migrants after Border Patrol allegedly witnessed him giving food and water to two migrants in the west desert near Cabeza Prieta. Warren was tried on three felony charges: two counts of harboring undocumented migrants and one count of conspiracy to transport and harbor them at a structure in Ajo at a staging area for humanitarian aid efforts called "The Barn." His arrest came only hours after No More Deaths published a report criticizing actions of Border Patrol and accusing them of destroying humanitarian supplies in the desert. Together with Warren, more volunteers were charged by the authorities.

At a trial in June 2019, the jury deadlocked after three days of deliberation. Federal prosecutors retried Warren, and in November 2019, Warren was acquitted on all charges.

== See also ==
- Water Station, a charitable organization providing water to people in Southern California desert areas
