= Migrant deaths along the Mexico–United States border =

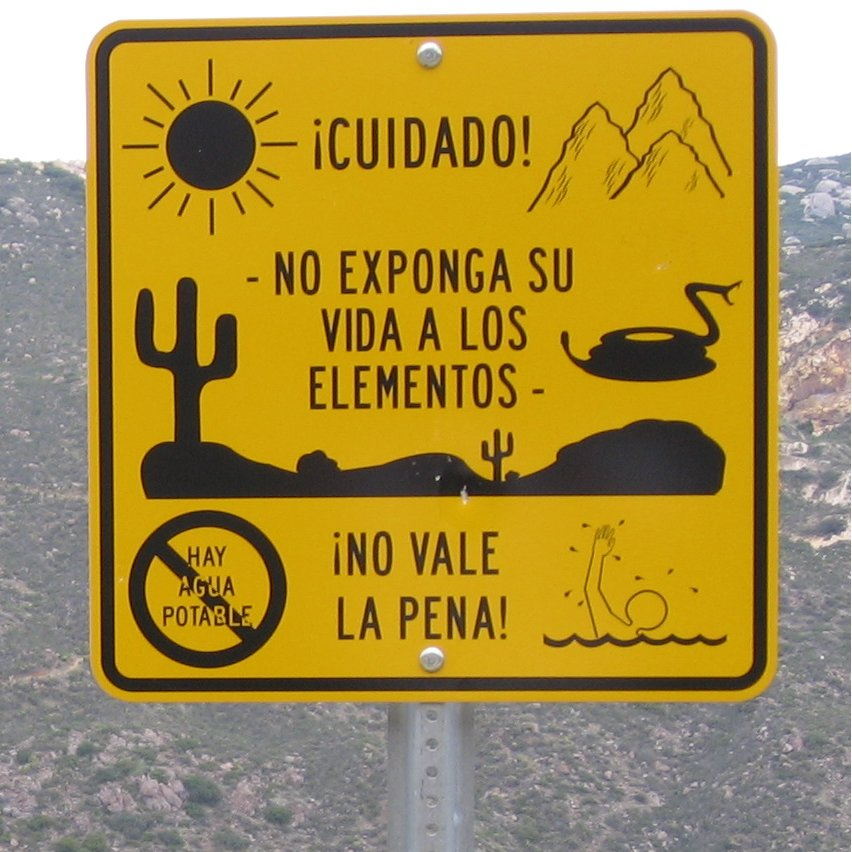
Border Patrol sign in Spanish, in California warning "Caution! Do not expose your life to the elements. It's not worth it!"

The United States border with Mexico is one of the world's "most lethal land borders". Hundreds of migrants die per year as they attempt to cross into the United States from Mexico illegally. The US Border Patrol reported 251 migrant deaths in the fiscal year 2015 (ending September 30, 2015), which was lower than any year during the period 2000–2014, and reported 247 migrant deaths in fiscal year 2020, lower than any year since 1998. Poverty, gang violence, poor governance, etc., are the main factors as to why migrants cross the US border. US Border Patrol recorded 557 southwest border deaths during fiscal year 2021 and 748 in the first 11 months of fiscal year 2022, the most deaths ever recorded. Exposure (including heat stroke, dehydration, and hyperthermia) were the leading causes.

The group Border Angels estimates that since 1994, about 10,000 people have died in their attempt to cross the border. According to the U.S. Customs and Border Protection, 8,050 people have died crossing the U.S–Mexico border between 1998 and 2020. In 2005, more than 500 died across the entire U.S.–Mexico border. The number of yearly border crossing deaths doubled from 1995 to 2005, and has since declined and then risen. The statistics reflect only known deaths and do not include estimates for those who have never been found. Some migrant deaths may go unreported even when they are brought to the attention of officials.

Mexico's Secretariat of Foreign Affairs has compiled data including deaths on the Mexican side of the border area during the period from 1994 to 2000. The data shows 87 deaths in 1996, 149 in 1997, 329 in 1998, 358 in 1999, and 499 in 2000. U.S. Border Patrol reported that 3,417 migrants were rescued in the fiscal year 2017.

== Data for Arizona ==
The Arizona Daily Star maintained a database daily of border deaths recorded by the Pima, Santa Cruz, Cochise, and Yuma County medical examiners between summer 2004 and September 2006. They stated, "With no official record-keeping system, the exact number of illegal entrants who have died along the Arizona stretch of U.S-Mexican border has never been known."

The number of dead border crossing migrants per year in Arizona increased from nine in 1990 to 201 in 2005; about 80% of the dead migrants were under 40 during 2000–2005, with an increasing number younger than 18 years of age.

== Trends ==
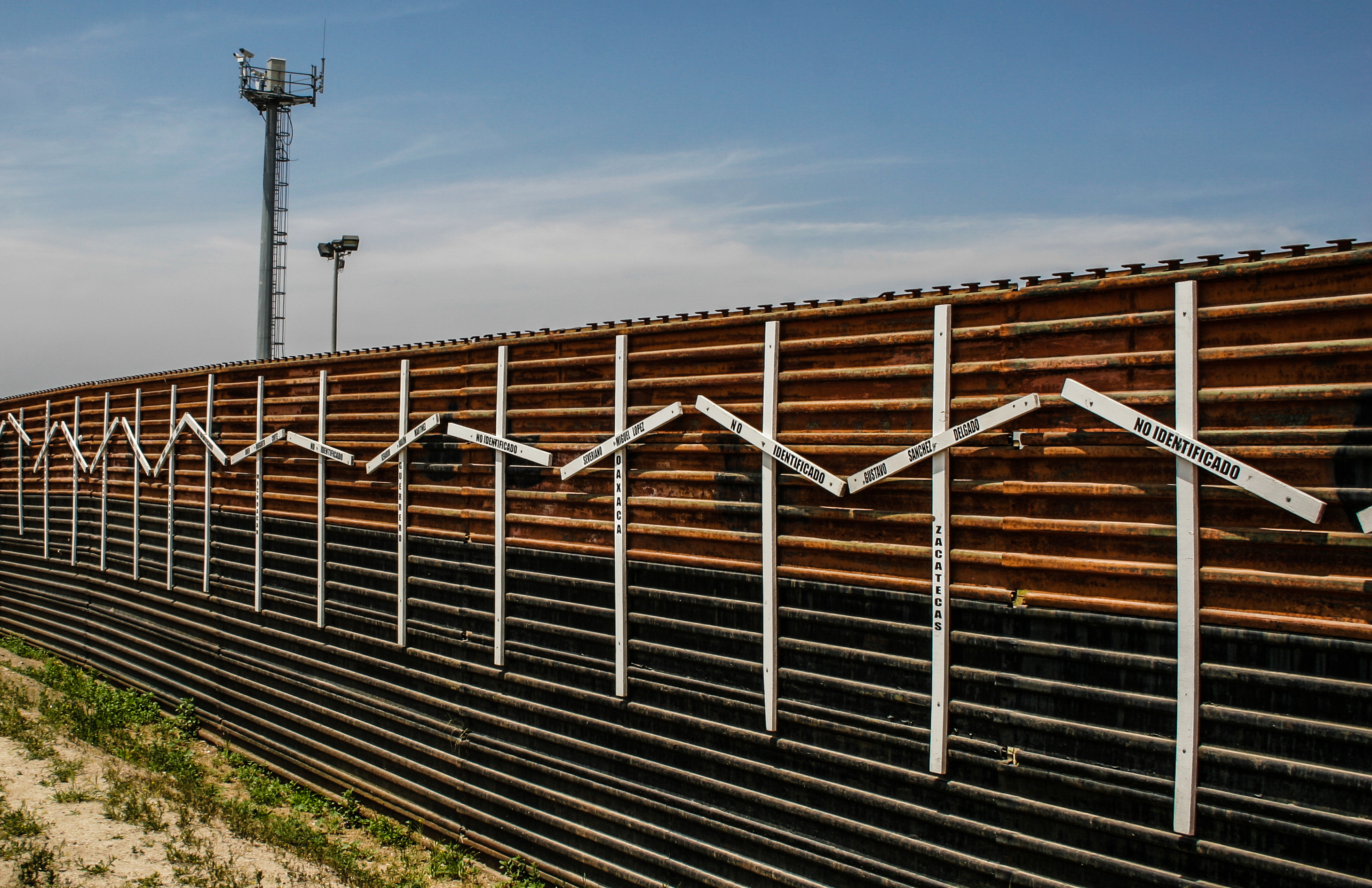
Mexico–United States barrier at the border of Tijuana, Mexico and San Diego, USA. The crosses represent migrants who have died in crossing attempts. Some who are identified, some not. Surveillance tower in the background.

A study by the Center for Immigration Research at the University of Houston found that, "In the late 1980s, the number of foreign transient deaths usually exceeded 300, and peaked in 1988 at 355. Thereafter, the number of deaths fell to 180 in 1993 and 1994. After 1994, the number of deaths started to increase again, peaking in 2000 at 370. Border Patrol counts for 2001 and 2002 show a small decrease in the number of deaths in those years compared to 2000."

The number of deaths of illegal immigrants along the border has increased on a regular, yearly basis since the mid-1990s, particularly in the state of Arizona. As of summer 2006, tighter enforcement in Arizona has likely led to fewer deaths there, but border-wide fatalities were approaching the record pace of 2005.

In 2012, the United States Border Patrol found the dead remains of 463 migrants in the U.S., of which 177 were discovered along the border section near Tucson, Arizona. The Rio Grande Valley of South Texas reported 150 migrant remains found, a jump from 2011 due to the increased numbers of Central American migrants.

An ethnographer by the name of Seth Holmes noted that there were 500 deaths in the Tucson region just in his second year of field studies. This shows how there was a high number of fatalities in a concentrated geographical area, suggesting that the overall total along the U.S.-Mexico border was higher.

=== Exposure ===
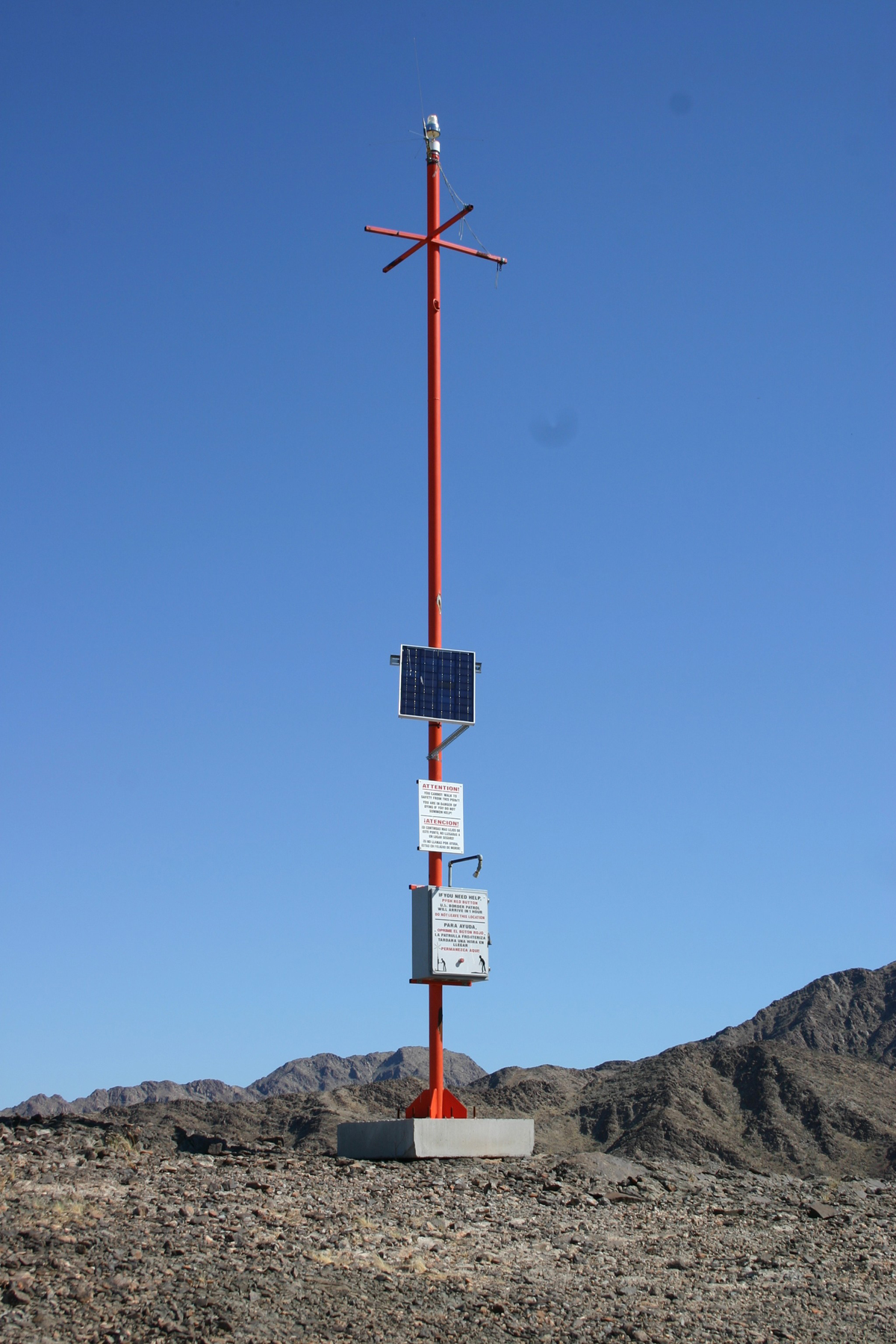
This rescue beacon states in English and Spanish: "Attention: You cannot walk to safety from this point! You are in danger of dying if you do not summon help! If you need help, push red button, U.S. Border Patrol will arrive in one hour, do not leave this location".

Hyperthermia is one of the most common causes of migrant deaths across the Mexico-U.S. border. There was a sharp rise in the number of people dying from heat related illnesses such as hyperthermia and dehydration from 1993 to 1997, as increased border enforcement diverted undocumented migration flows from urban crossing points to more remote areas where the risk of death was higher. On July 23, 2017, 10 illegal immigrants died of exposure in a tractor-trailer discovered at a Walmart in San Antonio.

On 25 June 2019, seven migrants, including a woman and three children, were found dead by U.S. Border Patrol Agents near the Rio Grande in South Texas. The death was reportedly due to heat exposure and dehydration. A 6-year-old Indian girl was also found dead in June 2019, from heat exposure in western Arizona, who was abandoned along with a group of migrants by the smugglers in a remote desert location.

On June 27, 2022, 53 people were discovered dead in and around a tractor-trailer near Lackland Air Force Base in San Antonio, Texas. The deaths were reportedly caused by heat exhaustion and asphyxiation during an apparent illegal migrant smuggling attempt across the US-Mexico border. It is described as the deadliest trafficking incident in the history of the United States.

=== Drowning ===
A common cause of immigrant border deaths is drowning in canals, ditches, and the Rio Grande. On January 14, 2024, a woman and two children drowned in the Rio Grande near Eagle Pass, Texas, as a result of a standoff between the Texas National Guard and U.S. Border Patrol. According to the Department of Homeland Security, border agents were made aware of a distress call from the Mexican government concerning a group of six, but were unable to assist them due to the Texas National Guard physically preventing them from doing so under the direction of Governor Greg Abbott.

=== Accidents ===
Significant numbers of undocumented immigrants die daily in car accidents and other accidental causes. According to a December 2006 cover story in the San Diego Reader, "...traffic fatalities involving immigrants have more than doubled since 2003 as coyotes, or polleros – the guides leading migrants across the border – try other methods. On August 7, nine migrants died in a crash in the Yuma sector when the driver of a Chevrolet Suburban – in which 21 Mexicans were 'stacked like cordwood' – lost control after crossing a Border Patrol spike strip at high speed. This year, the number killed in traffic accidents during illegal crossings is about 50."

In January 2003, two undocumented immigrant passengers died when their truck crashed on Interstate 8 while fleeing the Border Patrol, after a spike strip punctured a tire. A week after the accident, a third person, Elvia Rumbo Leyva, died in the hospital.

Close to one hundred undocumented immigrants were struck and killed on San Diego County freeways over five years in the late 1980s, prompting the creation of a highway safety sign to caution drivers about migrants crossing the road.

=== Border Patrol use of force Incidents ===
According to Rodolfo Acuña, Professor Emeritus of Chicano Studies at California State University, "Mexico's Ministry of Foreign Affairs reported 117 cases of human rights abuses by US officials against migrants from 1988 to 1990, including fourteen deaths. During the 1980s, Border Patrol agents shot dozens of people, killing eleven and permanently disabling ten."

On May 28, 1994, Martín García Martínez was shot by a Border Patrol agent at the San Ysidro port of entry. On 3rd July, he succumbed to his injuries.

In May 2000, an illegal immigrant was shot in the shoulder by a border patrolman near Brownsville, Texas, and died later from the wounds.

In January 2006, an eight-year veteran of the Border Patrol, fearful of stones which were being thrown at him shot Guillermo Martinez Rodriguez, a known people smuggler who had been detained 11 times prior. Rodriguez, with a gunshot to the back of his right shoulder, crossed back to Mexico and was taken to the Red Cross in Tijuana, where he died twenty-five and a half hours later from the injury. Under the Border Patrol's use-of-force guidelines, agents are permitted to employ lethal force against rock throwers if they pose a threat.

In January 2007, border patrol agent Nicholas Corbett shot and killed Francisco Javier Domínguez Rivera after the latter tried to smash his head with a rock according to the officer's lawyer. After the agent was acquitted of wrongdoing, a civil suit was filed on behalf of Rivera's parents. This civil suit claimed that the United States government was responsible for the wrongful death of Rivera because the agent was performing his official duty. Mexico lodged an official protest with the United States over the death, stating its "firm condemnation" and "serious concern over the recurrence of this type of incident." The protest demanded an exhaustive investigation. Though the incident was recorded by surveillance cameras, the recording was not very clear.

On May 28, 2010, Anastasio Rojas, a 42-year-old Mexican migrant worker, was tased and beaten at the San Ysidro border crossing by more than a dozen Customs and Border Protection officers. Rojas' death was featured on the PBS News Magazine "Need to Know" in April 2012, in which several civilian eyewitnesses gave their testimony and provided two amateur videos of the event. According to the witnesses, he was facedown on the ground and handcuffed while he was being tased and beaten, all the while being surrounded by twelve officers. His pleas for help are clearly audible on the amateur footage. In the hours before Rojas' death, he had tried to file a complaint against a Border Patrol officer for kicking his injured ankle. That officer and another officer would later drive Rojas to the border alone at night, soon after Rojas sustained fatal injuries. Since the initial broadcast of "Need to Know", 16 members of congress have demanded a justice department investigation into Anastasio Rojas' death while in Border Patrol's custody, which is currently under way. He leaves behind a wife and five children.

In June 2010, a 15-year-old Mexican citizen was shot to death on the Mexican side of the border near El Paso, Texas. The U.S. Border Patrol reported that the officers responded to a group of suspected illegal immigrants who were throwing rocks at them. President Felipe Calderón criticized the shooting by stating that "the use of firearms to repel attacks with stones represents disproportionate use of force". According to the data collected from No More Deaths from 2012 to 2015, there was at least 3586 gallons of water destroyed in the 800 square mile desert located near Arivaca, Arizona. This implies the intent of indirectly dehydrating migrants cause by U.S. border patrol agents.

On 14 September 2018, US media reported that Jacklyn, a 7-year-old from Guatemala had died while in custody of US Customs. In a letter from Fiona Danaher, a pediatrician at Massachusetts General Hospital, to the girl's parents wrote "Unfortunately, the Border Patrol agents at the forward operating base where Jakelin was apprehended did not conduct sufficient screening to identify her illness before the first bus left for the border patrol station." Jacklyn's family denied she did not have enough food to eat before being taken into Homeland Security custody.

=== Vigilante killings ===
According to Time Magazine, in the first half of 2000, three immigrants were killed and seven others wounded in showdowns on the U.S. side of the border.

In 2000, the United Nations opened an investigation into vigilante killings of migrants crossing Mexico's border with the U.S., dispatching a senior UN investigator to the border country close to where Sam Blackwood, a 74-year-old rancher, was charged with killing Eusebio de Haro, an unarmed Mexican he tried to subdue for the border patrol and shot in the back of the thigh, causing him to bleed to death after pursuing him a quarter mile down the road in his truck.

=== Intentional killings ===
On February 8, 2007, four gunmen of unknown nationality opened fire on a truck carrying illegal immigrants in the Ironwood Forest National Monument, killing two men and a 15-year-old girl.

== Impact on border communities ==
The impact of migrant deaths on border communities can be difficult for small towns on U.S. side, which have found themselves with hundreds of remains to identify and bury, at a cost of hundreds of thousands of dollars. In November 2013, the Office of the Medical Examiner in Pima County, Arizona, had 871 cases of unidentified remains dating as far back as the 1990s. Relief groups often aid migrants traveling along the border. A Mexican federal task force known as Grupos Betas protects migrants from crime while the migrants make the journey north. Other groups such as 'No More Deaths' provide migrants with humanitarian assistance and members participate in 'desert runs' to search for migrants in need of help.

== International consequences ==
The deaths have caused global tension between the United States and other countries, particularly Mexico and the countries of Central America, from where a majority of illegal immigrants who enter the United States through the Southwestern borders come. Foreign consulates across the Southwest United States, in particular those of Latin American nations, have condemned the deaths of illegal immigrants across the border.

== See also ==
- Mexico–United States border crisis
- Deaths along the Syria–Turkey border
- Deaths along the Bangladesh–India border
