= Water Station (organization) =

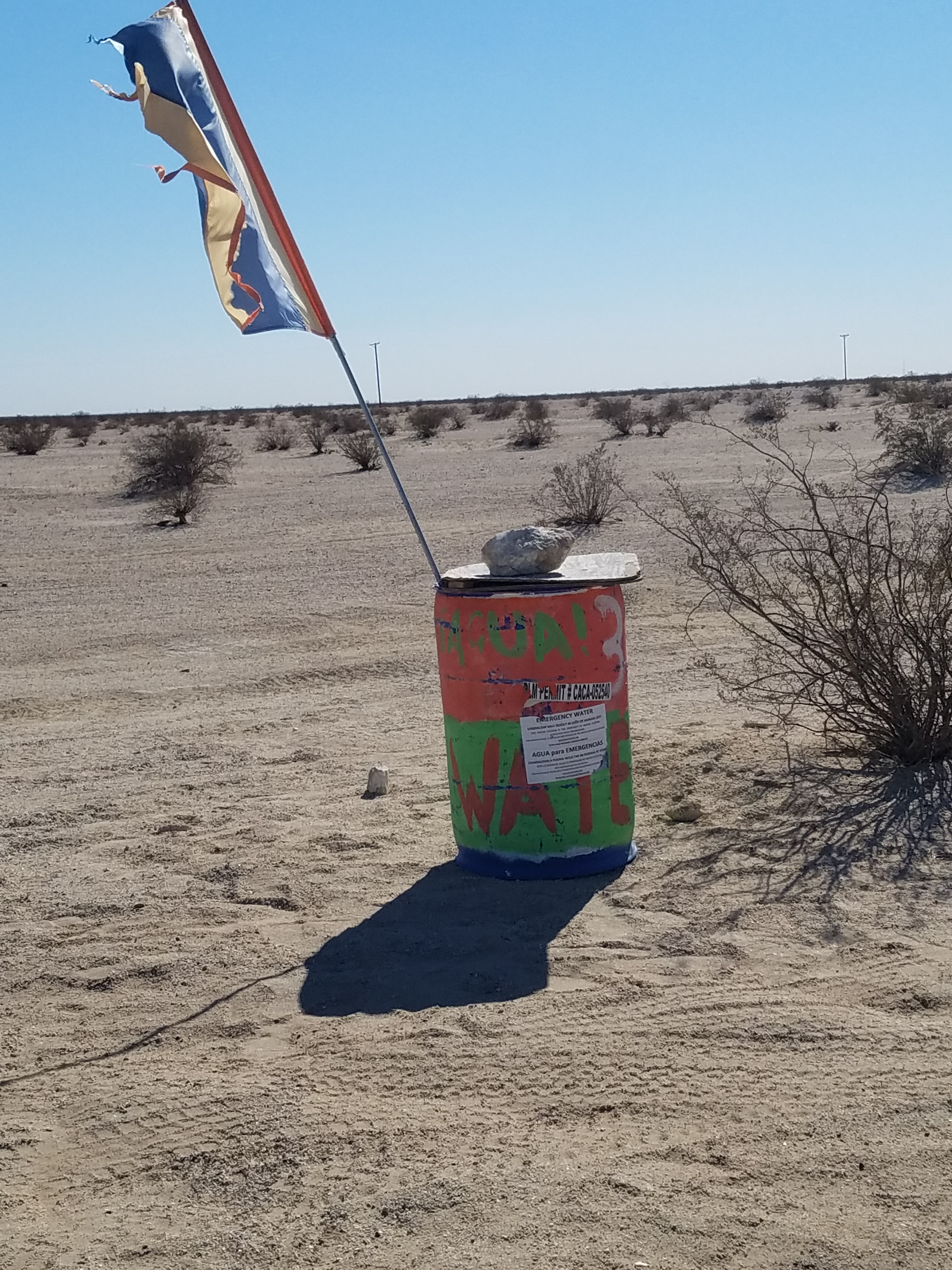
A Water Station water barrel and flag

Water Station is a charitable organization, founded in 2001 (24 years ago), that places water in remote locations throughout the Southern California desert where undocumented migrants are known to cross, in order to mitigate deaths that occur due to extreme heat exposure. It started as a project by John Hunter, a San Diego resident, to place water jugs and flags in the deserts around El Centro, California. The project later expanded to include additional volunteers maintaining hundreds of water stations. By 2013 KPBS described the organization as "the largest, most organized and most consistent group leaving water for migrants in California's brutal Imperial Valley". The charity operates primarily from April to October, and has permission from the Bureau of Land Management to place water and flags on public land.

== See also ==
- No More Deaths, a group providing aid to migrants crossing desert areas in Arizona
