= Center for Migration Studies of New York =

Educational institute and nonpartisan think tank

- Abbreviation: CMS
- Formation: 1964
- Type: Public policy think tank
- Headquarters: 307 East 60th Street
- Location: New York, New York
- Executive Director: Donald Kerwin
- Website: cmsny.org

The Center for Migration Studies of New York (CMS) is an educational institute and nonpartisan think tank based in New York City that studies domestic immigration and international migration issues. The organization is devoted to public policies that safeguard the dignity and rights of migrants worldwide. In recent years, CMS has been known for producing research addressing the U.S. immigrant detention system, the U.S. and global refugee protection systems, and data on the unauthorized immigrant population in the United States. CMS is a member of the Scalabrini International Migration Network, a global network of migrant shelters, service centers, and other institutions along migrant corridors and in border and destination communities.

== Publications ==
CMS publishes the International Migration Review, an interdisciplinary journal on migration, refugees, and ethnic group relations, as well as the Journal on Migration and Human Security, a peer-reviewed journal that publishes articles of policy-oriented research on the topic of migration.

== Archives ==
CMS has an extensive archive that is used widely for migration-related scholarship on immigration to the United States from the mid-19th to the 21st century, spanning (among movements to other geographic areas) immigrants to New England, the Midwest, the South, and the Pacific Northwest. Materials from the CMS archives have been featured in a variety of publications and media, including the 2014 PBS documentary series The Italian Americans.
