= Driver's licenses for illegal immigrants in the United States =

Undocumented immigrants can obtain driving licenses, permits, or similar documents. Undocumented immigrants cannot obtain driving licenses, permits, or similar documents. Data is up to date as of January 1, 2026.

As of January 2026, 19 U.S. states, the District of Columbia, and Puerto Rico issue driver's licenses or permits to some or all of the undocumented immigrant populations residing within their state or territory. State laws permitting this are on the books in California, Colorado, Connecticut, Delaware, Hawaii, Illinois, Maryland, Massachusetts, Minnesota, Nevada, New Jersey, New Mexico, New York, Oregon, Rhode Island, Utah, Vermont, Virginia, and Washington.

== California ==
In the state of California, obtaining a driver's license did not require proof of legal presence before the early 1990s. However, California blocked off this access in 1991 by asking all driver license applicants to provide proof of citizenship. Two years later, California explicitly committed to requiring proof of legal presence for state issued driver's licenses by passing Senate Bill 976. Under SB 976 anyone requesting a driver's license from the Department of Motor Vehicles (DMV) needed to provide proof of lawful presence in the United States.

The more stringent requirements did not sit well with some of California's state legislators. Gil Cedillo, for example, chipped away at SB 976, an attempt to remove the legal presence requirement in California for state issued driver's licenses. In 2003, one of Cedillo's proposals (Senate Bill 60) gained significant support in California's State legislature, was signed by former Governor Gray Davis, but did not become law. According to Tang (2018), Cedillo decided to scrap the bill because Governor Davis, who had signed the bill, was dealing with a gubernatorial recall election. Between 2006 and 2012, Cedillo continued the fight to remove the legal presence requirement. However, then-Governor Arnold Schwarzenegger vetoed efforts those bills supported by state legislators such as Cedillo during his term as governor (November 17, 2003 – January 3, 2011).

According to Andrea Silva, assembly member Luis Alejo joined the fight to license undocumented immigrants in California early on in 2013. Various progressive organizations such as the Coalition for Humane Immigrant Rights of Los Angeles (CHIRLA), the California Immigrant Policy Center (CIPC), the National Immigrant Law Center (NILC) and community activists rallied behind Alejo. However, not everyone was on board with the AB 60 law. For example, some groups such as Unlicensed to Kill and Californians for Population Stabilization resisted the measure. In the past, groups such as the Federation for American Immigration Reform have also supported requiring proof of legal presence to obtain California driver's licenses.

In 2013, California removed the proof of legal presence requirement to obtain a state issued driver licenses when California Governor Jerry Brown signed Assembly Bill 60 (AB 60) into law. Currently still known under its bill number, AB 60 removes the legal proof requirement in California to apply for a state issued driver's licenses. These driver's licenses are not REAL ID Act compliant. This means holders of these driver's licenses could not use this identification to board an airplane, vote, or enter federal facilities. Moreover, all applicants need to have their vehicles insured. However, some California residents who do not support the AB 60 law questions whether these safeties are enough.

The AB 60 law did not take effect until the beginning of 2015. In the first twelve months, a little over 600,000 people in California met all the eligibility requirements to obtain a driver's license. This number continued to increase in the following months. By mid 2017, a little over 900,000 people without proof of legal presence in California obtained a driver's license under the AB 60 law. With an increase in AB 60 driver's licenses, at least one study suggests there has been a decrease in hit-and-run incidents.

== New York ==
=== Prior to 2002 ===
Prior to 2002, obtaining a driver's license in New York did not require proof of legal presence.

=== Actions of the Pataki administration in 2002 and 2004 ===
In September 2002, Governor George Pataki issued an executive order directing the Department of Motor Vehicles to require a social security number before issuing a driver's license. The Pataki administration presented the measure as a "crackdown on license fraud and as the kind of national security measure demanded by the Sept. 11 attacks". In 2004, under a policy instituted by the Pataki administration, the Department of Motor Vehicles began putting "temporary visitor" marks on licenses issued to individuals with temporary visas, along with the date that those visas expired.

=== First attempts to restore access to drivers licenses for illegal immigrants ===
On September 21, 2007, Governor Eliot Spitzer issued an executive order directing that state offices allow illegal immigrants to be issued driver's licenses. The measure was supposed to be effective in December 2007. Eventually, the executive order was withdrawn. The effort by Eliot Spitzer was introduced as a legislative bill, which was defeated in the New York State Senate. Finally, the effort to restore access to driver's licenses was passed as an administrative measure through the Department of Motor Vehicles only to be withdrawn in the face of political opposition and criticism.

In 2017, New York began issuing "REAL ID"-compliant driver's licenses. The state now employs a multi-tier system, as permitted by federal law, and offers three licenses: (1) the "enhanced" license, (2) The "REAL ID" license, and (3) the "standard" license, which is used for identification purposes and for driving, but is not REAL ID-compliant. Displayed on its face are the words, "NOT FOR FEDERAL PURPOSES".

From 2002 to 2019, undocumented immigrants were not eligible for driver's licenses in New York. Although there is nothing in New York law that mandates legal status to acquire a standard driver's license, a 2002 executive order issued by then-Governor George Pataki established a regulation that effectively bars illegal immigrants and other individuals without a Social Security number from obtaining licenses.

=== Green Light New York Coalition ===
In 2016, renewed effort formed a new coalition: Green Light NY. The coalition was formed primarily by Justice for Migrant Families, Worker Justice Center of New York, Workers’ Center of Central New York Columbia County Sanctuary Movement, Nobody Leaves Mid Hudson, Neighbors Link, MinKwon Center for Community Action, New York Immigration Coalition, and Make the Road New York with the state-wide coordination of the New York Immigration Coalition and Nobody Leaves Mid Hudson.

In 2019, the coalition broadened and gained the critical support of many persons and organizations including: New York City Mayor, Bill de Blasio, Brooklyn District Attorney Eric Gonzalez, Bronx District Attorney Darcel Clark, Manhattan District Attorney Cy Vance, Jr. On February 13, 2019, the coalition secured a resolution form the New York City Council calling for state legislation addressing this matter. New York State Attorney General Letitia James also came out in support of the proposed legislation. Other social leaders came on board, including Rev. Al Sharpton who stated: "When routine traffic stops regularly lead to arrests and deportations of Black and Brown New Yorkers, something has to give, ... that's why the Green Light NY bill isn't just a public safety issue — it's a civil rights concern."

=== Political Issue in the 2018 New York State Elections ===
The issue gained increased attention during the 2018 New York gubernatorial election, particularly in the Democratic primary. Cynthia Nixon, a candidate in the primary, announced alongside Council Member Carlos Menchaca that, if elected, she would issue an executive order to immediately restore access to driver's licenses on her first day in office.

Governor Andrew Cuomo, the incumbent, consistently opposed restoring access through an executive order, arguing that history showed such attempts were destined to fail. Attorney Luis Gomez Alfaro and the Latinos for Cuomo Committee strongly supported full legislation instead, fearing that an executive order could be challenged by County Executives or County Clerks. Before the contested primary, Kathy Hochul reversed her opposition to restoring driver's licenses, aligning with her running mate, Gov. Andrew Cuomo, in supporting licenses for illegal immigrants. Cuomo decisively defeated Nixon in the Democratic primary and went on to win re-election.

=== Assembly vote ===
In 2019, Assemblyman Marcos Crespo introduced a bill A03675 named the "Driver's License Access and Privacy Act." On June 5, 2019, Speaker Carl Heastie announced that the Assembly would bring the bill to a vote and pass the bill, calling it "a critical step towards making our roads safer, boosting our state's economy and protecting hardworking New Yorkers and their families." On June 12, 2019, Bill A03675 passed the Assembly with 86 votes in favor and 47 votes against the bill.

=== Senate vote ===
In 2019, a version of the "Driver's License Access and Privacy Act", bill S1747. was introduced into the Senate by Luis Sepulveda. Unlike Speaker Heastie, Majority Leader Andrea Stewart-Cousins had not publicly omitted to schedule the bill for a vote before the end of the 2019 Legislative Session. On June 11, 2019, Deputy Majority Leader, Senator Mike Gianaris came in support of scheduling a vote for the bill stating “I wholeheartedly support this proposal and encourage all my colleagues to get behind this proposal before the legislative session ends.” After the vote had cleared the Transportation Committee, Governor Cuomo expressed last-minute fears that the federal government could use state-collected information for immigration enforcement and almost derailed the vote after asking Solicitor General Barbara Underwood to weigh in on the matter. On June 17, 2019, the Attorney General of New York, Letitia James answered the governor stating: "I support the Green Light bill, and the Office of Attorney General has concluded that it is constitutional." She added that "the legislation is well crafted and contains ample protections for those who apply for driver's licenses." She concluded that "If this bill is enacted and challenged in court, we will vigorously defend it.” Additionally, the Office of the Attorney General released a memo regarding the Green Light Bill, which put to rest any legal questions and allowed the bill to be put forward for a vote before the end of the 2019 Legislative Session. The Senate passed the bill on June 17, 2019, with 33 votes in favor and 29 votes against. The legislation was signed into law by Governor Cuomo the same night that it passed the Senate.

=== Reaction ===
Some county clerks said they would not comply with the law, stating that federal labor law prohibits employment of illegal immigrants. Monroe County Executive Cheryl Dinolfo said she was making plans to sue and called her county's legislature to craft a bill allowing a lawsuit challenging the constitutionality of the plan. Erie County Clerk Michael Kearns has stated that he will not enforce the law and that he's going to federal court. Attorney General of New York Letitia James said she would defend the law. She stated: “It is not an immigration bill. It's not going to dumb down our citizenship. It basically gives a privilege to individuals to drive to work and to school.”

Among the Democratic senators, seven opposed the Driver's License Access and Privacy Act: James Skoufis, Kevin Thomas, Monica R. Martinez, Todd Kaminsky, John E. Brooks, Anna M. Kaplan, and Jim Gaughran. This list includes all 6 senators from Long Island, including the three with the most recent immigrant heritage: Kevin Thomas, Anna M. Kaplan, and Monica R. Martinez. Of all Senators voting against the bill, Senator Monica R. Martinez faced the most criticisms as she had previously been a supporter of the effort to restore access to drivers licenses for illegal immigrants, but changed her position after becoming a New York State Senator.

== Oregon ==
Oregon now issues such licenses, following the passage of the Equal Access To Roads Act (HB 2015) in the Oregon legislature; governor Kate Brown signed the bill into law on August 9, 2019, and it became effective immediately. Oregon also previously issued such licenses in 2008 and from 2013 until the 2014 Oregon Ballot Measure 88.
