= SJL =

SJL may refer to:

- Sheila Jackson Lee
- St. John's Lutheran Church
- Sir John Lawes School
