= St. John's Lutheran Church =

St. John's Lutheran Church may refer to:

== United States ==
(by state, then city/town)

- St. John's Lutheran Church (Orange, California), listed on the National Register of Historic Places (NRHP) in Orange County
- St. John's Lutheran Church (Atlanta, Georgia), Sam Venable's home before being bought and converted into a church in 1959
- St. John's Lutheran Church (Wheaton, Illinois)
- St. John's Lutheran Church and School, Dillsboro, Indiana, listed on the NRHP in Dearborn County
- St. John's Lutheran Church (Ellettsville, Indiana)
- St. John's Lutheran Church (Goshen, Indiana), listed on the NRHP in Elkhart County
- St. John's Lutheran Church (Hampton, Iowa), listed on the NRHP in Franklin County
- St. John's Lutheran Church (Kalona, Iowa), listed on the NRHP in Johnson County
- St. John's Lutheran Church (Hagerstown, Maryland)
- St. John's Lutheran Church (Parkville, Maryland)
- Saint John's Lutheran Church (Adrian, Michigan), listed on the NRHP in Lenawee County
- St. John's Lutheran Church (Port Hope, Michigan), listed on the NRHP in Huron County
- St. John's Lutheran Church (Isanti, Minnesota), listed on the NRHP in Isanti County
- St. John's Lutheran Church (Northfield, Minnesota)
- St. John's Evangelical Lutheran Church (Corning, Missouri)
- St. John Lutheran Church (Ellisville, Missouri), (Missouri's second largest church according to membership)
- St. John's Lutheran Church Complex, Auburn, Nebraska, listed on the NRHP in Nemaha County
- St. John's Lutheran Church (Ancram, New York)
- St. John's Lutheran Church (Beekman Corners, New York), listed on the NRHP in Schoharie County
- St. John's Lutheran Church (Conover, North Carolina)
- St. John's Lutheran Church (Salisbury, North Carolina)
- South Wild Rice Church, near Galchutt, North Dakota, also known as St. John's Lutheran Church, listed on the NRHP in Richland County
- St. John's Lutheran Church (Dublin, Ohio), listed on the NRHP in Franklin County
- St. John's Lutheran Church (Petersburg, Ohio)
- St. John's Evangelical Lutheran Church (Stovertown, Ohio), listed on the NRHP in Muskingum County
- St. John's Lutheran Church (Zanesville, Ohio), listed on the NRHP in Muskingum County
- St John's Evangelical Lutheran Church (Erie, Pennsylvania)
- St. John's Lutheran Church (Pomaria, South Carolina), listed on the NRHP in Newberry County
- St. John's Lutheran Church (Walhalla, South Carolina), listed on the NRHP in Oconee County
- St. John's Lutheran Church (Knoxville, Tennessee), listed on the NRHP in Knox County
- St. John's Evangelical Lutheran Church (Wharton, Texas), listed on the NRHP in Wharton County
- St. John's Lutheran Church and Cemetery, Wytheville, Virginia, listed on the NRHP in Wythe County
- St. John's Lutheran Church (Spokane, Washington)
- St. John's Lutheran Church (Brookfield, Wisconsin)
- St. John's Lutheran Church (Evansville, Wisconsin), listed on the NRHP in Rock County

== Other countries ==
- St John's Lutheran Church, Bundaberg, Queensland, Australia
- St John's Lutheran Church, Geelong, Victoria, Australia

== See also ==
- St. John's Evangelical Lutheran Church (disambiguation)
