= Craig Bone =

United States Coast Guard admiral

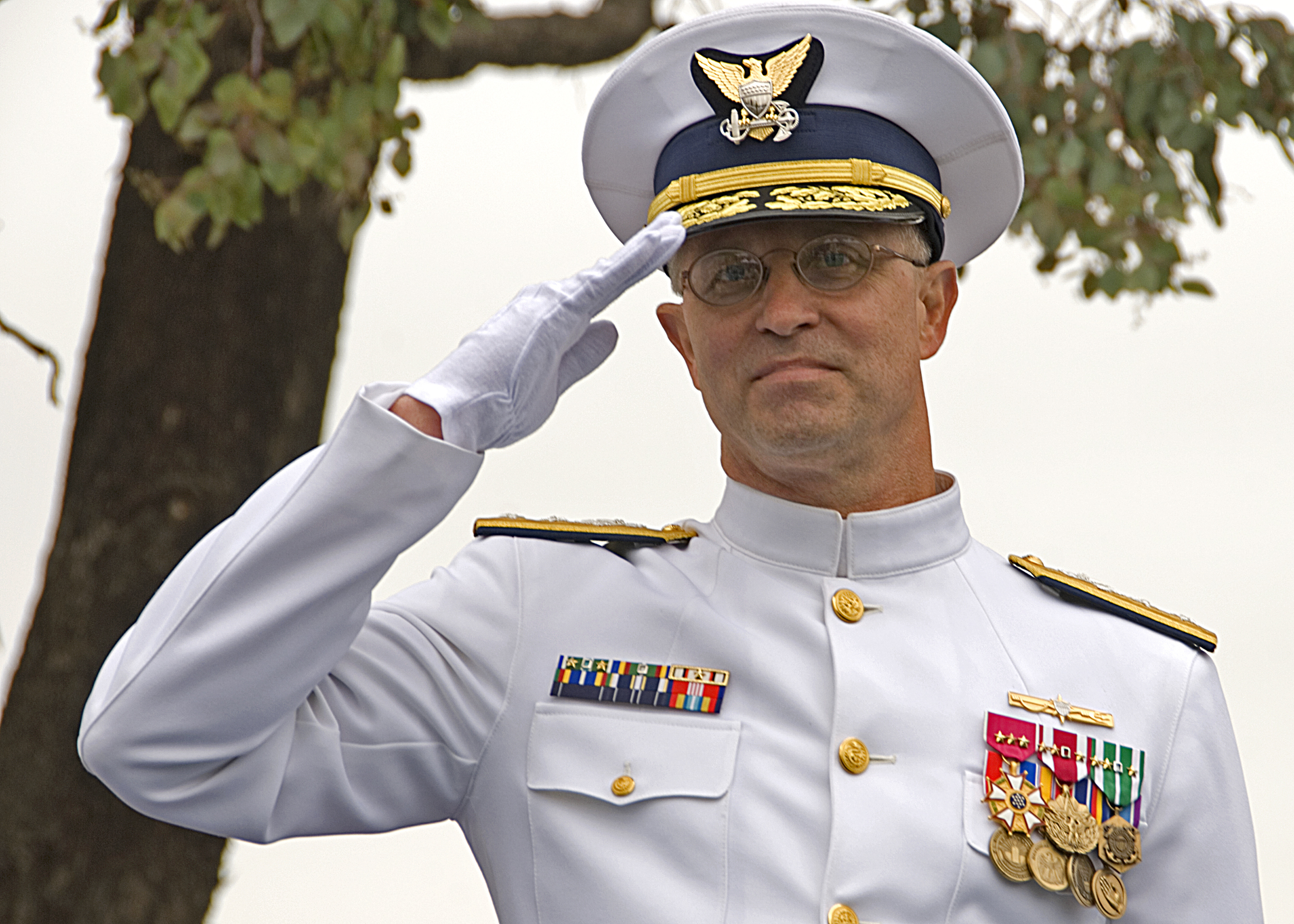
Rear Admiral Craig E. Bone U.S. Coast Guard

Rear Admiral Craig E. Bone is a former government executive under President George W. Bush, playing a key role in the forwarding of maritime domain awareness works, inter alia the container security initiative and implementation of the Maritime Transportation Security Act, as part of the wider Global Maritime Intelligence Integration Plan of this administration.

His last post involved services as director of inspection and compliance, U.S. Coast Guard. Bone retired as vice president of government operations at the American Bureau of Shipping in 2019.

== Cosco Busan ==
Bone came under heavy criticism for the slow-response and botched clean-up efforts of the U.S. Coast Guard in relation to the Cosco Busan oil spill, an incident whereby a container ship ran-into the San Francisco–Oakland Bay Bridge.

An on-site investigation by members of Congress took place in late 2007, inspired by media reports of the U.S. Coast Guard's slow response to the incident, and subsequent environmental damage resulting from the 58,000 gallon oil spill.

A hearing was held before the House Infrastructure and Transportation Committee's subcommittee on November 19, 2007 the U.S. Coast Guard's response to a 58,000 gallon oil spill on the San Francisco Bay in San Francisco, California. The ten-member congressional panel included House speaker Nancy Pelosi. Bone testified before Congress in relation to this event.

== National Security Maritime Strategy ==
The U.S. National Security Maritime Strategy (NSMS) is closely tied to the NSPD-41/HSPD-13 Presidential Directive of 2005.

In his presentation to the House Subcommittee on USCG and Maritime Transportation, Bone presented the Maritime Domain Awareness strategy as "the effective understanding of anything associated with the global maritime domain that could impact the security, safety, economy or environment of the United States."

Bone worked with U.S. Coast Guard's area maritime security committees which assessed specific port vulnerabilities and created plans to address those vulnerabilities. These plans evaluate the overall susceptibility of marine targets, their use to transport terrorists or terror materials, and their use as potential weapons.

The Global Maritime Intelligence Integration Plan uses existing capabilities to integrate all available intelligence regarding potential threats to U.S. interests in the Maritime Domain.

== Career ==
Bone served the Coast Guard for 31 years, in a series of very senior positions, most recently as commander of the Eleventh CG District on the Pacific coast. He is the former assistant commandant for marine safety, security and environmental protection, directing the agency's policy and programs for port, vessel and facility maritime safety and security management. He has led the US delegation to the International Maritime Organization (IMO) and spearheaded implementation of the Maritime Transportation Security Act and the development of international commercial vessel safety and security standards. He has served as captain of the port and officer in charge of marine inspection for the ports of New York/New Jersey and Savannah, Georgia as well as a breadth of ship construction and repair experience as a marine inspector serving in US ports and overseas shipyards.

A 1977 graduate of the U. S. Coast Guard Academy, Bone began his Coast Guard career as a deck watch officer aboard the Coast Guard Cutter Hamilton (WHEC 715) in Boston, Mass. He entered the marine safety field in 1979 serving in a variety of positions at Marine Safety Offices as well as Washington, D.C., and has served as an overseas marine inspector of U.S. flagged vessels under construction and operating in Japan, Singapore, Korea, and Hong Kong.

In 1994, he provided review and analysis support to the Department of Transportation budget and legislative efforts. Following this, he planned and executed all waterside security for the 1996 Olympics and served as the Coast Guard's 1996 Olympics Deputy Task Force Commander.

Previous posts include services as captain of the Port New York/New Jersey and commander of Coast Guard Activities New York. He has also served as chief, Officer Personnel Management Division, Coast Guard Personnel Command, Washington, D.C. Bone also served as the Office of Marine Safety, Security, and Environmental Protection chief, Office of Waterways Management, Planning and Policy. Previously Bone served as the director of port security.

== Education ==
Rear Admiral Bone holds an M.S. in national resource strategy from the National Defense University Industrial College, and a M.S. in information systems technology from George Washington University.
