= Essential Transportation Worker Identification Credential Assessment Act =

American legislation

- Long title: To require the Secretary of Homeland Security to prepare a comprehensive security assessment of the transportation security card program, and for other purposes.
- Announced in: the 113th United States Congress
- Sponsored by: Rep. Sheila Jackson Lee (D, TX-18)
- Number of co-sponsors: 2

Codification
- Acts affected: Intelligence Reform and Terrorism Prevention Act of 2004
- U.S.C. sections affected: 8 U.S.C. § 1365b, 46 U.S.C. § 70105
- Agencies affected: Government Accountability Office, Department of Homeland Security

Legislative history
- Introduced in the House as H.R. 3202 by Rep. Sheila Jackson Lee (D, TX-18) on September 27, 2013; Committee consideration by United States House Committee on Homeland Security, United States House Homeland Security Subcommittee on Border and Maritime Security, United States House Homeland Security Subcommittee on Transportation Security; Passed the House on July 28, 2014 (Roll Call Vote 456: 400-0)

The Essential Transportation Worker Identification Credential Assessment Act (H.R. 3202) is a bill that would direct the United States Department of Homeland Security to assess the effectiveness of the Transportation Worker Identification Credential (TWIC) program. The bill would require an independent assessment of how well the TWIC program improves security and reduces risks at the facilities and vessels it is responsible for. The evaluation would include a cost-benefit analysis and information on alternate technologies that could be used.

The bill was introduced into the United States House of Representatives during the 113th United States Congress.

== Background ==
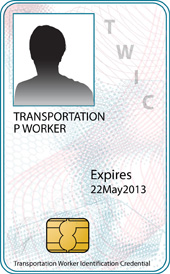
A sample Transportation Worker Identification Credential.

The Transportation Worker Identification Credential (TWIC) program is a Transportation Security Administration and U.S. Coast Guard initiative in the United States. The TWIC program provides a tamper-resistant biometric credential to maritime workers requiring unescorted access to secure areas of port facilities, outer continental shelf facilities, and vessels regulated under the Maritime Transportation Security Act of 2002, or MTSA, and all U.S. Coast Guard credentialed merchant mariners. As of May 2014, there were 2,999,058 people enrolled in the program.

Critics assert that the program has cost over $420 million and has little to show for it. A 2013 GAO report found the TWIC card reader pilot program results to be unreliable and questioned "the program's premise and effectiveness in enhancing security." Rep. John Mica (R-FL) has called them "at best no more useful than library cards.

== Provisions of the bill ==
This summary is based largely on the summary provided by the Congressional Research Service, a public domain source.

The Essential Transportation Worker Identification Credential Assessment Act would direct the United States Secretary of Homeland Security (DHS) to submit to Congress and the Comptroller General (GAO) a comprehensive assessment of the effectiveness of the transportation security card program at enhancing security or reducing security risks for maritime facilities and vessels.

The bill would direct the Secretary to issue a corrective action plan based on the assessment that responds to the findings of a cost-benefit analysis of the program and enhances security or reduces security risk for such facilities and vessels.

The bill would direct the Comptroller General, within 120 days after the Secretary issues the corrective action plan, to: (1) review the extent to which the submissions implement certain recommendations issued by the Comptroller General, and (2) inform Congress as to the responsiveness of the submission.

The bill would prohibit the Secretary from issuing a final rule requiring the use of transportation security card readers until: (1) the Comptroller General informs Congress that the submission is substantially responsive to the GAO recommendations, and (2) the Secretary issues an updated list of transportation security card readers that are compatible with active transportation security cards.

== Congressional Budget Office report ==
This summary is based largely on the summary provided by the Congressional Budget Office, as ordered reported by the House Committee on Homeland Security on June 11, 2014. This is a public domain source.

H.R. 3202 would direct the Secretary of Homeland Security to assess the effectiveness of the Transportation Worker Identification Credential (TWIC) program. That program was established under the Maritime Transportation Security Act (MTSA), which requires the Secretary of Homeland Security to provide a biometric security credential for personnel who require unescorted access to secure areas of MTSA-regulated facilities and vessels and to all mariners who hold credentials issued by the U.S. Coast Guard. Based on the findings of the proposed assessment, H.R. 3202 would direct the Secretary to identify and implement corrective actions necessary to improve the effectiveness of the TWIC program and require the Government Accountability Office (GAO) to report to the Congress on the status of those efforts. Finally, H.R. 3202 would specify conditions that would pertain to certain rulemakings related to the TWIC program.

Based on information from the Coast Guard and GAO, the Congressional Budget Office (CBO) estimates that implementing H.R. 3202 would cost about $1.5 million in 2015, assuming appropriation of the necessary amounts. That estimate is based on the historical cost of studies and analyses undertaken by those agencies that are similar in scope to those envisioned under the bill. Enacting H.R. 3202 would not affect direct spending or revenues; therefore, pay-as-you-go procedures do not apply.

H.R. 3202 contains no intergovernmental or private-sector mandates as defined in the Unfunded Mandates Reform Act and would impose no costs on state, local, or tribal governments.

== Procedural history ==
The Essential Transportation Worker Identification Credential Assessment Act was introduced into the United States House of Representatives on September 27, 2013 by Rep. Sheila Jackson Lee (D, TX-18). It was referred to the United States House Committee on Homeland Security, the United States House Homeland Security Subcommittee on Border and Maritime Security, and the United States House Homeland Security Subcommittee on Transportation Security. On July 17, 2014 it was reported (amended) alongside House Report 113-528. On July 28, 2014, the House voted in Roll Call Vote 456 to pass the bill 400-0.

== See also ==
- List of bills in the 113th United States Congress
