= SAFE Port Act =

Law regulating port security and online gambling

- Other short titles: Unlawful Internet Gambling Enforcement Act of 2006; Warning, Alert, and Response Network Act
- Long title: An Act to improve maritime and cargo security through enhanced layered defenses, and for other purposes.
- Acronyms (colloquial): SPA
- Nicknames: Security and Accountability For Every Port Act of 2006
- Enacted by: the 109th United States Congress
- Effective: October 13, 2006

Citations
- Public law: 109-347
- Statutes at Large: 120 Stat. 1884

Codification
- Acts amended: Maritime Transportation Security Act of 2002; Homeland Security Act of 2002; Tariff Act of 1930
- Titles amended: 6 U.S.C.: Domestic Security; 46 U.S.C.: Shipping
- U.S.C. sections created: 6 U.S.C. ch. 3 § 901 et seq.
- U.S.C. sections amended: 46 U.S.C. ch. 701, subch. I § 70101 et seq.

Legislative history
- Introduced in the House as H.R. 4954 by Dan Lungren (R-CA) on March 14, 2006; Committee consideration by House Homeland Security, House Transportation and Infrastructure; Passed the House on May 4, 2006 (421-2 Roll call vote 127, via Clerk.House.gov); Passed the Senate on September 14, 2006 (98-0 Roll call vote 249, via Senate.gov); Reported by the joint conference committee on September 29, 2006; agreed to by the House on September 30, 2006 (409-2 Roll call vote 516, via Clerk.House.gov) and by the Senate on September 30, 2006 (Agreed unanimous onsent); Signed into law by President George W. Bush on October 13, 2006

The Security and Accountability For Every Port Act of 2006 (or SAFE Port Act, Pub. L. 109–347 (text) (PDF)) was an Act of Congress in the United States covering port security and to which an online gambling measure was added at the last moment. The House and Senate passed the conference report on September 30, 2006, and President George W. Bush signed the Act into law on October 13, 2006.

== Port security provisions ==
The port security provisions were one of 20 bills introduced to Congress in the wake of the Dubai Ports World controversy that aimed to block Dubai Ports World acquiring P&O Ports, and more generally to stop key US ports falling into the hands of foreign owners by changing the Exon–Florio Amendment. The act codified into law a number of programs to improve security of U.S. ports, such as:

- Additional requirements for maritime facilities
- Creation of the Transportation Worker Identification Credential
- Establishment of Interagency Operations Centers for port security
- Port Security Grant Program
- Container Security Initiative
- Foreign port assessments
- Customs Trade Partnership against Terrorism

In addition, the Act created the Domestic Nuclear Detection Office within the Department of Homeland Security and appropriated funds toward the Integrated Deepwater System Program, a long-term U.S. Coast Guard modernization program.

== Internet gambling provisions ==
Title VIII of the Act is also known as the Unlawful Internet Gambling Enforcement Act of 2006 (or UIGEA). This title (found at 31 U.S.C. §§ 5361–5367) "prohibits gambling businesses from knowingly accepting payments in connection with the participation of another person in a bet or wager that involves the use of the Internet and that is unlawful under any federal or state law." The Economist noted that the UIGEA provisions were "hastily tacked onto the end of unrelated legislation".

== See also ==
- Maritime Transportation Security Act of 2002
- Port security
- Transportation Worker Identification Credential
