= Sheila Jackson Lee =

American lawyer and politician (1950–2024)

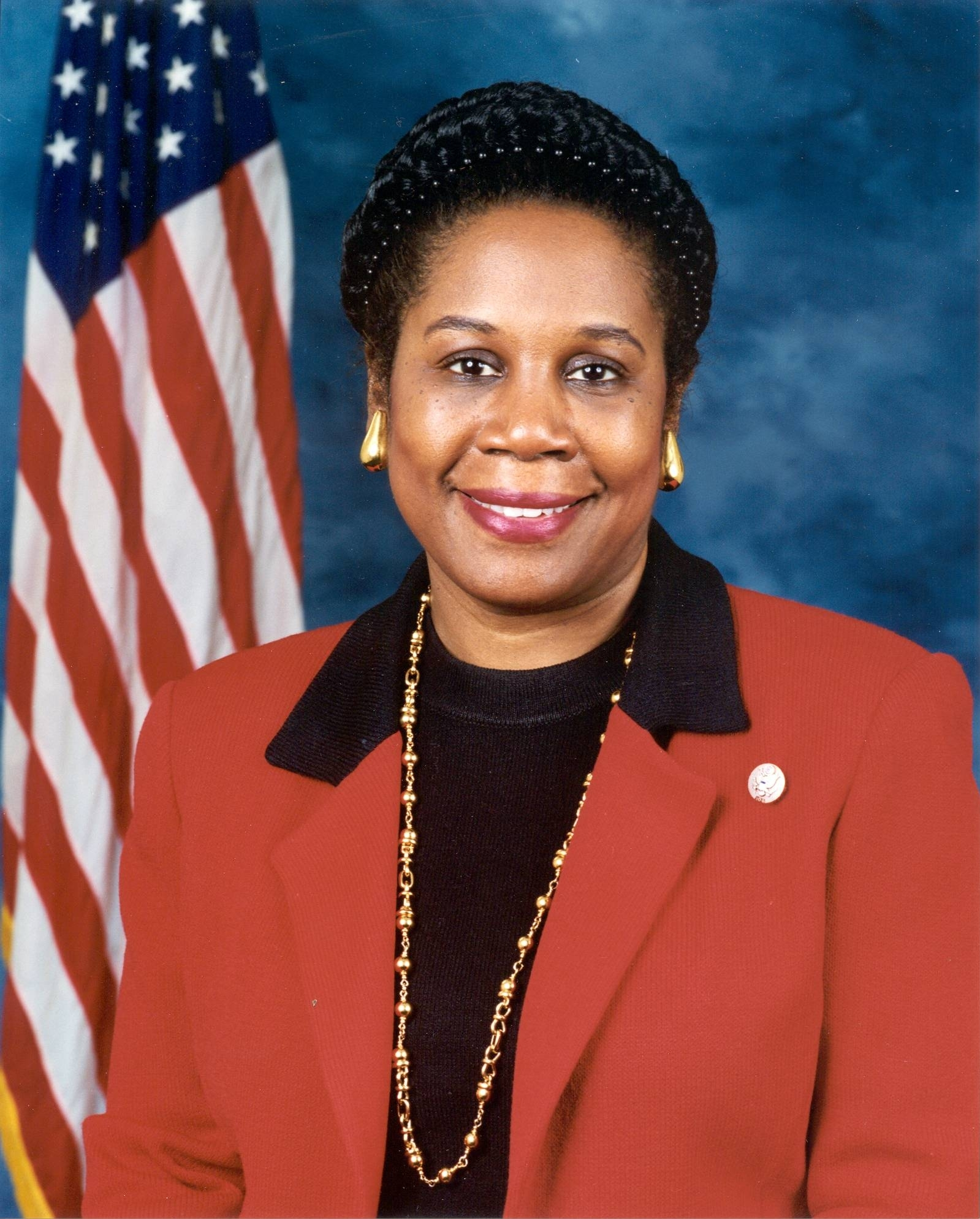

Member of the U.S. House of Representatives from Texas's 18th district
- In office January 3, 1995 – July 19, 2024
- Preceded by: Craig Washington
- Succeeded by: Erica Lee Carter

Member of the Houston City Council from the at-large district
- In office January 2, 1990 – January 3, 1995
- Preceded by: Anthony Hall
- Succeeded by: John Peavy

Personal details
- Born: Sheila Jackson; January 12, 1950 New York City, U.S.
- Died: July 19, 2024 (aged 74) Houston, Texas, U.S.
- Party: Democratic
- Spouse: Elwyn Lee (m. 1973)
- Children: 2, including Erica
- Education: New York University; Yale University (BA); University of Virginia (JD)
- Website: House website
- Jackson Lee's voice Jackson Lee supporting the Equal Rights Amendment; Recorded April 27, 2023

Sheila Jackson Lee (née Jackson; January 12, 1950 – July 19, 2024) was an American lawyer and politician who was the U.S. representative for Texas's 18th congressional district, from 1995 until her death in 2024. The district includes most of central Houston. She was a member of the Democratic Party and served as an at-large member of the Houston City Council before being elected to the House. She was also co-dean of Texas's congressional delegation.

Born in Queens, New York, Jackson Lee earned a scholarship for Black students at New York University before transferring to graduate with a Bachelor of Arts in political science from Yale University in 1972 and a Juris Doctor from the University of Virginia School of Law in 1975. In 1987, after she had moved to Houston, she was appointed as a municipal judge for the city by Kathy Whitmire. In 1989, Jackson Lee was elected to the Houston City Council. She served in the office until 1994, when she began a campaign for a seat in the U.S. Congress. In the Democratic primary, she defeated incumbent Craig Washington and went on to easily win the general election.

During her congressional tenure, Jackson Lee supported progressive policies such as gun control and Medicare for All. She introduced the Essential Transportation Worker Identification Credential Assessment Act in 2013 and the Sabika Sheikh Firearm Licensing and Registration Act in 2021. In 2019, Jackson Lee stepped down as chair of the Congressional Black Caucus Foundation and a subcommittee in the House Judiciary after a lawsuit filed by a former staffer claimed she was fired due to planned legal action against an alleged rape by a supervisor.

Jackson Lee announced her candidacy for the 2023 Houston mayoral election in March of that year. In the first round, she placed second behind state senator John Whitmire. However, as no candidate crossed the 50% threshold to win outright, a runoff election occurred on December 9, 2023. Despite several key endorsements, Jackson Lee lost the election to Whitmire. On December 11, she filed to run for re-election to her congressional seat and won the Democratic primary on March 5, 2024. In July 2024, she died in office after being diagnosed with pancreatic cancer.

== Early life and career in Texas ==
External videos
- Congresswoman Jackson Lee "Kneeling in Defense of 1st Amendment", speech in the House of Representatives, September 25, 2017

Sheila Jackson was born in the New York City borough of Queens on January 12, 1950. Her father, Ezra Clyde Jackson, who was born in Brooklyn, was a comic book artist and the son of Jamaican immigrants. Her mother, Ivalita Bennett Jackson, was a nurse, and came to New York at an early age from her birthplace of St. Petersburg, Florida.

Jackson graduated from Jamaica High School in Queens. She earned a Bachelor of Arts in political science from Yale University in 1972 and a Juris Doctor from the University of Virginia School of Law in 1975. She moved to Houston in 1987 when her husband, Elwyn Lee, accepted a position at the University of Houston. She got a job at Leon Jaworski's law firm. She made three previous unsuccessful attempts at local judgeships before becoming a Houston municipal judge, a position she held from 1987 to 1990. Kathy Whitmire, the mayor of Houston, appointed Jackson Lee to the position, along with Sylvia Garcia.

In 1989, Jackson Lee won the at-large position for a seat on the Houston City Council, serving until 1994. On the city council, she helped pass a safety ordinance that required parents to keep their guns away from children. She also worked for expanded summer hours at city parks and recreation centers as a way to combat gang violence.

== U.S. House of Representatives ==
=== 1994 run for office ===
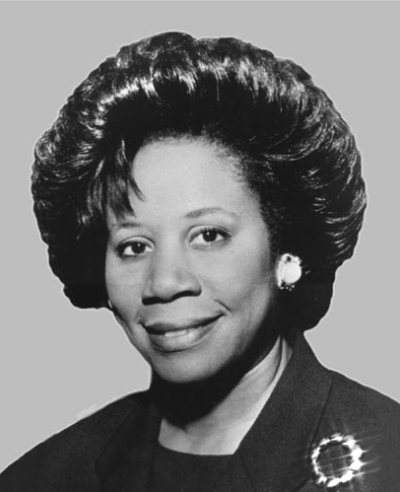
Lee in 1997

In 1994, Jackson Lee challenged four-term incumbent U.S. Representative Craig Washington in the Democratic primary. Washington had come under fire for opposing several projects that would have benefited the Houston area. Jackson Lee defeated Washington, 63% to 37%. The victory was tantamount to election in this heavily Democratic, black-majority district. In the general election, she defeated Republican nominee Jerry Burley, 73%–24%.

=== Tenure ===
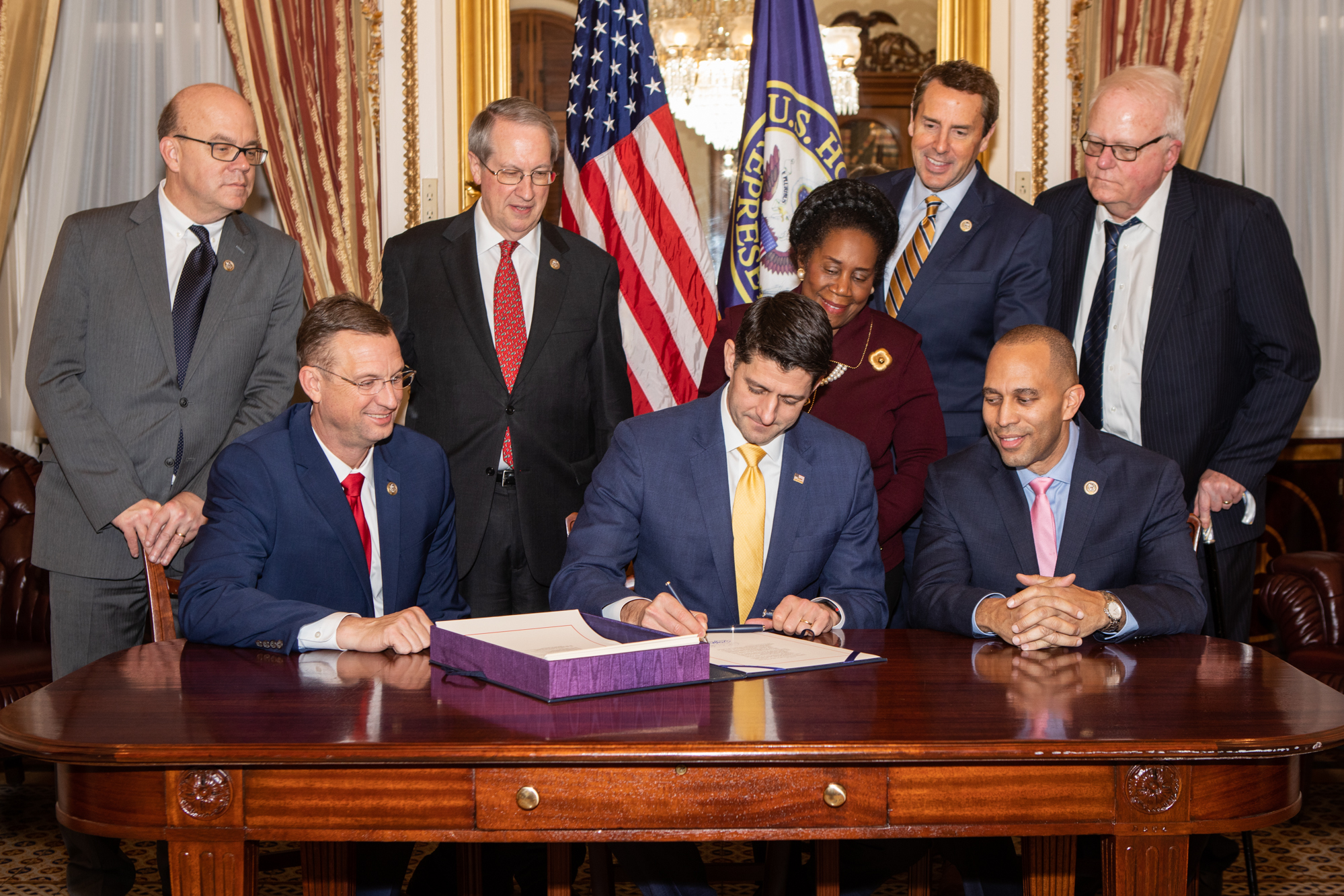
Jackson Lee watches as Paul Ryan signs the First Step Act of 2018.

Before the 110th Congress, Jackson Lee served on the House Science Committee and on the Subcommittee that oversees space policy and NASA. She was a member of the Congressional Black Caucus and a CBC whip.

On September 27, 2013, Jackson Lee introduced the Essential Transportation Worker Identification Credential Assessment Act (H.R. 3202; 113th Congress), a bill that would direct the United States Department of Homeland Security to assess the effectiveness of the Transportation Worker Identification Credential (TWIC) program. The bill would require an independent assessment of how well the TWIC program improves security and reduces risks at the facilities and vessels it is responsible for.

In January 2019, The New York Times reported that Jackson Lee planned to resign as chair of the Congressional Black Caucus Foundation. The move came in the wake of a lawsuit filed by a former staffer earlier in January that claimed the staffer was fired in retaliation for her planned legal action related to an alleged rape by a supervisor in 2015. The resignation came the day after the National Alliance to End Sexual Violence announced it would not support making Jackson Lee the lead sponsor of a law to reauthorize the federal Violence Against Women Act. She also stepped down from her chairmanship of the House Judiciary subcommittee.

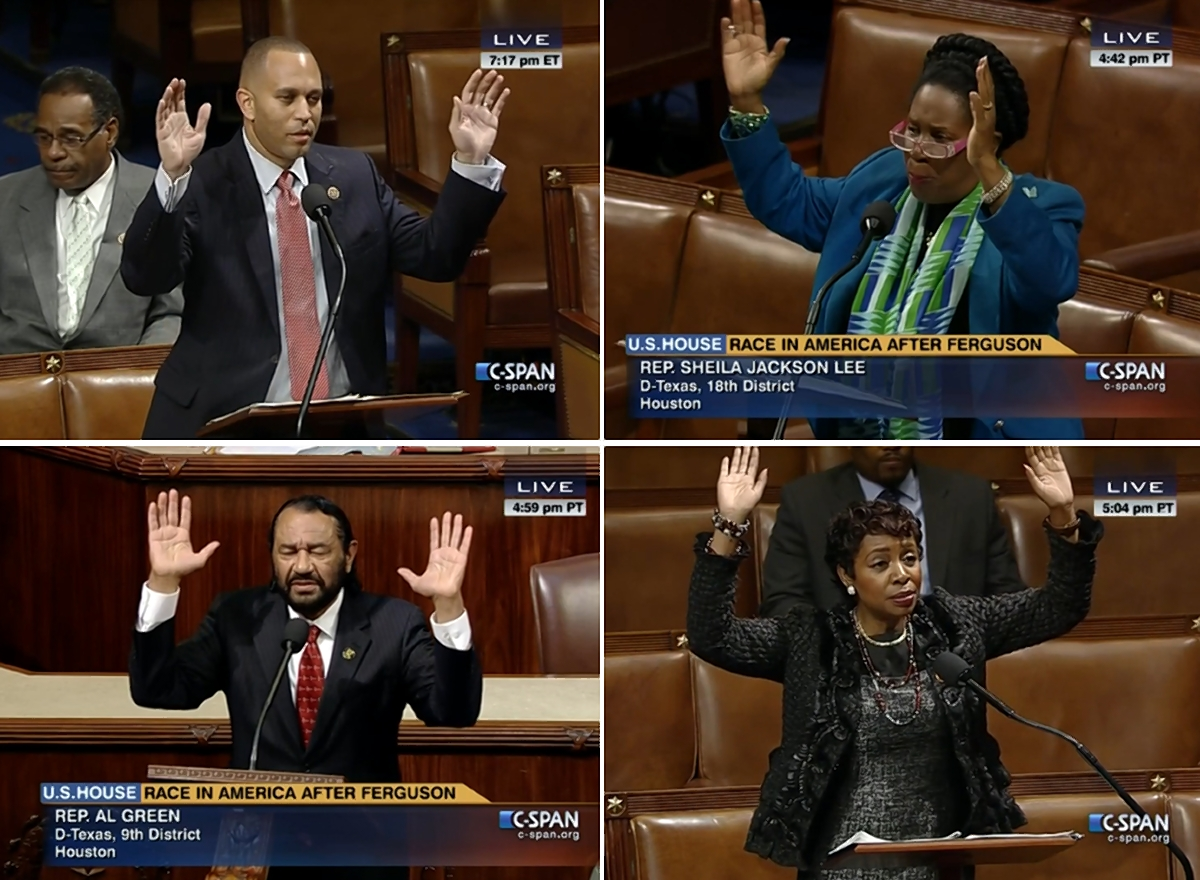
Jackson Lee and others using the "hands up don't shoot" gesture in recognition of the Ferguson, Missouri police shooting

On January 4, 2021, Jackson Lee introduced the Sabika Sheikh Firearm Licensing and Registration Act (H.R. 127; 117th Congress), a bill that expanded requirements for firearm licensing to every firearm and banned any ammunition of .50 caliber BMG or larger.

In the 117th Congress (2021–2023), Jackson Lee voted with United States President Joe Biden's stated position 100 percent of the time, according to a FiveThirtyEight analysis. Jackson Lee and Representative Lloyd Doggett became co-deans of Texas's congressional delegation in January 2023 after the retirement of Eddie Bernice Johnson.

=== Staffing issues ===
In 1998, The Houston Press reported that five of Jackson Lee's staffers had quit that spring. The paper quoted her former Capitol office executive assistant and events scheduler, Rhiannon Burruss, as saying that "the congresswoman's abrasive ways not only drove off staff members but irritated Continental Airlines staffers to the point where one suggested she fly on a competitor instead." In 2011, Jackson Lee was reported to have one of the highest staff turnover rates in Congress. The Huffington Post and the Houston Chronicle reported that she had gone through eleven chiefs of staff in eleven years. A 2013 report concluded that "the veteran Texas Democrat had the highest turnover rate for all of Congress over the [previous] decade." Washingtonian magazine named Jackson Lee as the "meanest Democratic Congress member" in both 2014 and 2017. In 2018, LegiStorm reported that Jackson Lee's annual turnover rate, at 62%, was the highest in Congress.

In 2023, during her Houston mayoral run, an unverified audio leaked of Jackson Lee berating her staffers with profanity. The recording was about a minute and half in length, where Jackson Lee allegedly tells a staffer she wants him to have a "fuckin' brain" and that "nobody knows a Goddamn thing in my office — nothing." She then describes a different staffer as a "fat-ass stupid idiot" and that both of them are "fuck-ups" and that they are "two Goddamn big-ass children, fuckin' idiots who serve no Goddamn purpose." Her mayoral campaign refused to verify the authenticity of the recording and alleged that "these attacks have originated from extremely conservative blogs and political operatives backing John Whitmire." (Note: John Whitmire is a Democratic state senator who was Jackson Lee's primary opponent in the mayoral election.) Whitmire's campaign stated they had no involvement with the recording. Jackson Lee responded to the release of the recording by saying, "I am regretful and hope you will judge me not by something trotted out by a political opponent ... but from what I've delivered to Houstonians over my years of public service" and said that "everyone deserves to be treated with dignity and respect, and that includes my own staff."

=== Committee assignments ===
- Committee on the Judiciary
  - Subcommittee on Crime, Terrorism, and Homeland Security
  - Subcommittee on Immigration and Border Security
- Committee on Homeland Security
  - Subcommittee on Cybersecurity, Infrastructure Protection, and Security Technologies
  - Subcommittee on Counterterrorism and Intelligence
- Committee on the Budget

=== Caucus memberships ===
Jackson Lee was a member of several caucuses, including:

- Black Maternal Health Caucus
- Congressional Caucus on Global Road Safety
- Congressional Human Rights Caucus
- Congressional Pakistan Caucus
- US-Afghan Caucus
- Veterinary Medicine Caucus
- Congressional Progressive Caucus
- House Baltic Caucus
- Congressional Arts Caucus
- Congressional Friends of Norway Caucus
- Afterschool Caucuses
- Interstate 69 Congressional Caucus
- Congressional NextGen 9-1-1 Caucus
- Congressional Songwriters' Caucus
- Congressional Ukraine Caucus
- Congressional Taiwan Caucus
- Congressional Wildlife Refuge Caucus
- United States Congressional International Conservation Caucus
- U.S.-Japan Caucus
- Medicare for All Caucus
- United States–China Working Group
- Congressional Caucus on Turkey and Turkish Americans

== 2023 Houston mayoral run ==
On March 27, 2023, Jackson Lee announced her candidacy for the mayor of Houston in the 2023 election. Jackson Lee garnered endorsements from notable political figures such as outgoing Houston mayor Sylvester Turner, former House speaker Nancy Pelosi, and former presidential candidate Hillary Clinton. On November 7, 2023, Jackson Lee came in second place in the election, behind Democratic state senator John Whitmire. However, none of the 18 candidates who ran managed to surpass the required 50 percent threshold.

Jackson Lee and Whitmire advanced to a runoff election on December 9, 2023. Jackson Lee was ultimately defeated by Whitmire, who won with nearly 65 percent of the vote. Following her loss, Jackson Lee filed for re-election to her U.S. House seat on December 11, 2023.

== Political views and statements ==
=== Foreign policy ===
In 2000, Jackson Lee favored permanently normalizing trade status for the People's Republic of China and argued that it would aid both human rights and Houston's economy.

Jackson Lee traveled to the 2001 World Conference against Racism in South Africa, and backed sanctions against Sudan. Jackson Lee voted against the Authorization for Use of Military Force Against Iraq Resolution of 2002 that authorized the Iraq War. On April 28, 2006, along with four other members of Congress and six other activists, she was arrested for disorderly conduct in front of Sudan's embassy in Washington DC. They were protesting the role of Sudan's government in ethnic cleansing in Darfur.

Jackson Lee urged for better relations between the U.S. and Venezuela, which she described as a friendly nation. She said the U.S. should reconsider its ban on selling F-16 fighter jets and spare parts to Venezuela. The United States Department of State bans such sales due to the alleged "lack of support" for counter-terrorist operations and Venezuela's relations with Iran and Cuba.

In May 2015, Jackson Lee took a trip to Azerbaijan, paid by the Azerbaijani government.

Jackson Lee condemned the President of Turkey Recep Tayyip Erdoğan's wide-ranging purges following a failed July 2016 coup in Turkey.

After the Iranian retaliatory strikes in April 2024 following the Israeli bombing of the Iranian embassy in Damascus, Jackson Lee posted on Twitter that "Iran is a terrorist nation." and that the nation had "launched a disproportionate terrorist attack against our ally Israel."

=== Domestic policy ===
Jackson Lee was active on immigration issues. She had proposed increasing border security and increasing opportunities for legalization among those living in the U.S. She opposed a guest worker program, saying that the idea "connotate[s] 'invite, come,' and, at the same time, it misleads because you ask people to come for a temporary job of three to six years and they have to leave if they don't have another job and I would think that they would not."

Jackson Lee opposed repealing the Patient Protection and Affordable Care Act.

At a March 2011 Homeland Security Committee hearing on radical Muslims in the U.S., Jackson Lee said that Peter King's hearings were helping al-Qaeda and "going the same route as Arizona." She complained that the hearings were scaring Muslim Americans and called them "an outrage".

Following Debbie Wasserman Schultz's resignation as chair after the 2016 Democratic National Committee email leak, Jackson Lee campaigned with her and traveled the districts African American churches with Wasserman Schultz for her primary campaign against Tim Canova.

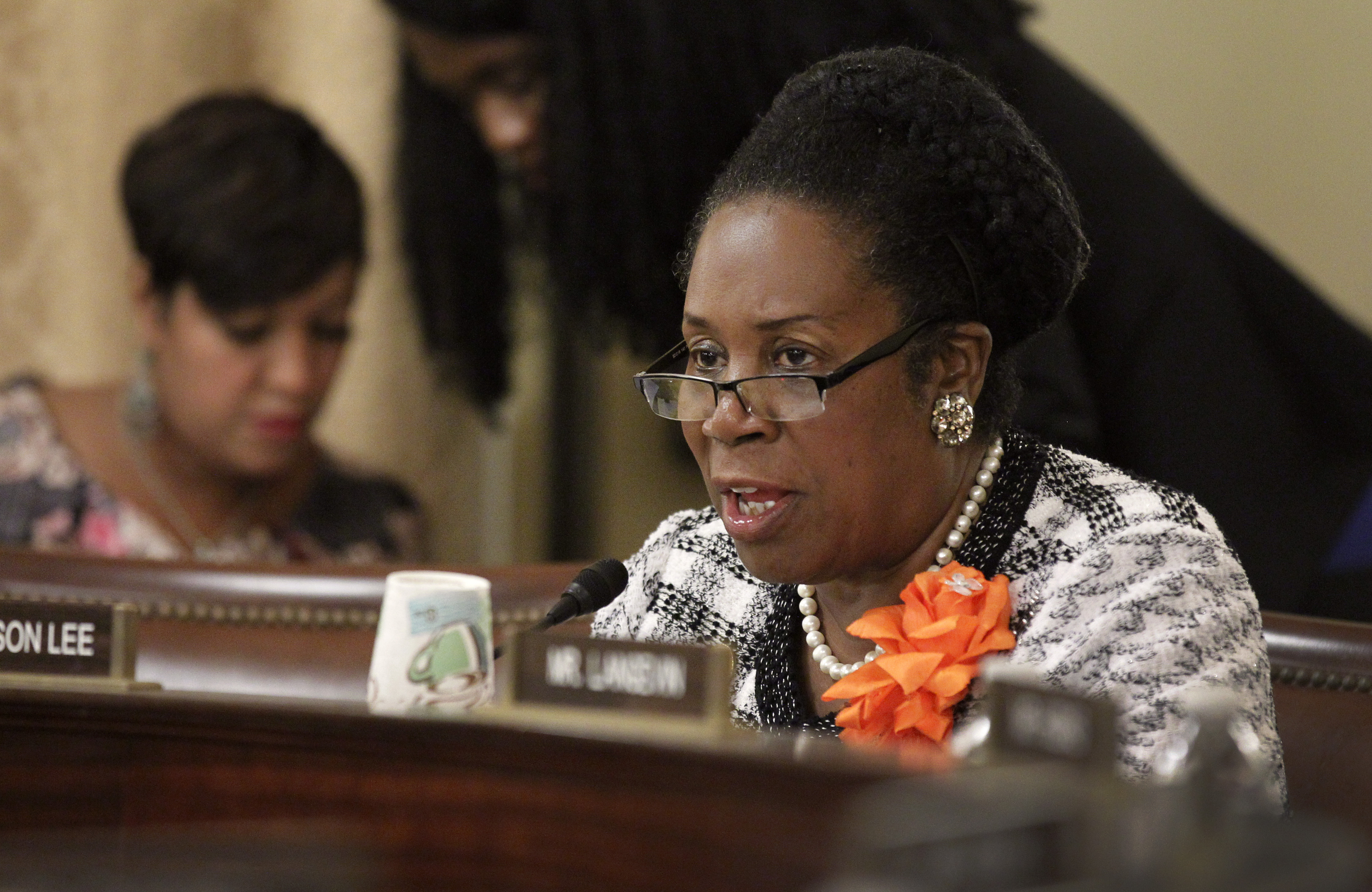
Rep. Sheila Jackson Lee questions U.S. Customs and Border Protection Deputy Commissioner Kevin K. McAleenan during testimony in a 2016 House Committee on Homeland Security hearing.

In August 2022, Jackson Lee voted for the Inflation Reduction Act. Jackson Lee was one of three Democrats that abstained from voting in the successful formal censure of congresswoman Rashida Tlaib proposed by Rich McCormick.

=== LGBT rights ===
Jackson Lee voted "present" on the Defense of Marriage Act of 1996. In 2009, she voted for the Matthew Shepard and James Byrd Jr. Hate Crimes Prevention Act, a bill that expanded the federal hate crime law to cover crimes biased by the victim's sexual orientation or gender identity. In 2010, she voted in favor of the Don't Ask, Don't Tell Repeal Act that allowed gay, lesbian, and bisexual people to serve openly in the U.S. military.

In 2019, Jackson Lee voted for the Equality Act, which expanded the federal Civil Rights Act of 1964 to ban discrimination based on sexual orientation and gender identity. Jackson Lee criticized Republican representatives who opposed the legislation on religious grounds.

=== Racial issues ===
In 2003, Jackson Lee suggested changing the naming practices for tropical cyclones and hurricanes, saying that "all racial groups should be represented" and that meteorological organizations should "try to be inclusive of African American names."

Speaking at the July 2010 NAACP national convention, Jackson Lee compared the Tea Party movement to the Ku Klux Klan, saying that "all those who wore sheets a long time ago have now lifted them off". Jackson Lee's remarks were criticized by conservatives, including Tea Party Caucus founder Michele Bachmann (R-MN).

In December 2017, Jackson Lee was accused of having been given preferential treatment by United Airlines by a passenger who claimed a first-class seat ticket she had purchased had been given to the congresswoman. United Airlines had claimed that the woman who purchased the first-class seat had cancelled her ticket and later apologized for the incident. Jackson Lee claimed she was accused because of her race.

Jackson Lee was one of the leading lawmakers behind the effort to have Juneteenth recognized as an American federal holiday. Recognition was achieved in 2021.

Following the death of Rep. John Conyers in 2019, Jackson Lee also became the lead sponsor for H. R. 40, the bill that Conyers had introduced since 1989 to establish a Commission to Study and Develop Reparation Proposals for African-Americans. In 2019, on June 19, or Juneteenth, Jackson Lee presided over a House Judiciary Committee hearing about the bill. Two years later, the committee voted to report the bill to the House.

=== Presidential election objections ===
In 2001, Jackson Lee and other House members objected to counting Florida's electoral votes, which George W. Bush narrowly won after a contentious recount in the 2000 presidential election. Because no senator joined the objection, it was dismissed by Senate President Al Gore.

In 2005, Jackson Lee was one of the 31 House Democrats who voted not to count Ohio's electoral votes in the 2004 presidential election. Without Ohio's electoral votes, the election would have been decided by the U.S. House of Representatives, with each state having one vote in accordance with the Twelfth Amendment to the United States Constitution.

During the 2017 United States Electoral College vote count, Jackson Lee objected to counting North Carolina, South Carolina, and Wyoming's electoral votes in the 2016 presidential election. Because no senator joined her objections, they were dismissed.

=== COVID-19 ===
During the COVID-19 pandemic in Texas, Jackson Lee appealed to city officials in Houston for free and reduced-price parking at the George Bush Intercontinental Airport. This reduced the number of bus riders by about 1000 employees per day and increased social distancing. Jackson Lee also supported airline workers at United Airlines that were targeted for furloughs after the airline had accepted billions of dollars in taxpayer funds through the CARES Act and the Paycheck Protection Program.

=== Gaffes ===
According to The Daily Beast, Jackson Lee had a "history of wild statements" and political gaffes. These include incorrectly stating that the U.S. Constitution was 400 years old; mistakenly criticizing Wikipedia instead of WikiLeaks; incorrectly calling the Moon a "planet" that is made "mostly of gases"; and saying that North Vietnam and South Vietnam were, in 2010, still separate countries.

The Hill reported that during a 1997 visit to the Mars Pathfinder operations center, Jackson Lee asked whether the Pathfinder rover had taken a picture of the U.S. flag planted by Neil Armstrong; the flag had been planted on the Moon, not Mars. Jackson Lee was at the time a member of the Subcommittee on Space and Aeronautics of the House Science Committee. In response, Jackson Lee's deputy chief of staff accused the newspaper of racial bias without disputing the story's accuracy. The Hill denied the allegations and stood by its reporting.

In July 2014, Jackson Lee said that "we did not seek an impeachment" of President George W. Bush. Jackson Lee was one of 11 co-sponsors of the 2008 U.S. House bill H. Res. 1258, which sought to impeach Bush for "deceiving Congress with fabricated threats of Iraq WMDs". Jackson Lee's spokesperson later said that she "misspoke".

A campaign advertisement for Jackson Lee in the 2023 Houston mayoral election instructed viewers to vote on the wrong date. Jackson Lee's spokesperson attributed the error to an external advertising agency.

== Personal life ==
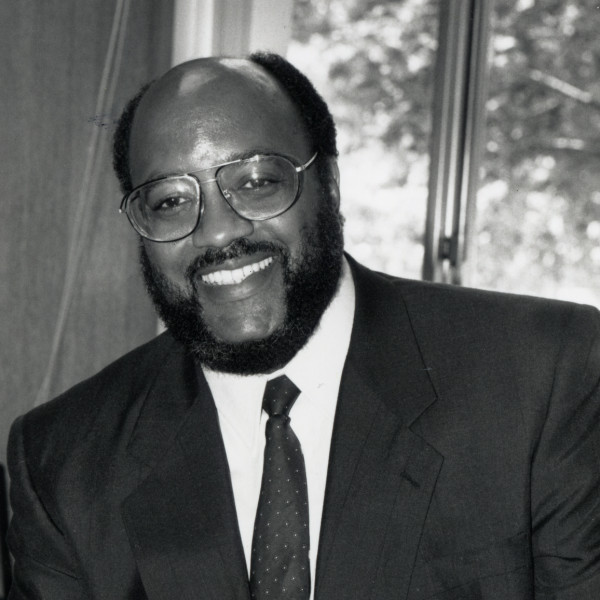
Elwyn Lee in 2011

In 1973, Jackson Lee married Elwyn Lee, who has served as a law professor and vice president of student affairs at the University of Houston. The couple had two children, including her daughter Erica Lee Carter who replaced her in Congress. Her son Jason would become the senior advisor to Chicago mayor Brandon Johnson and would gain considerable influence over Johnson's policymaking, with the Chicago Sun-Times even describing Jason as Chicago's "shadow mayor" in January 2025. Jackson Lee was a Seventh-day Adventist. She was a member of the Alpha Kappa Alpha sorority as well as The Links organization.

=== Illness and death ===
Jackson Lee previously had breast cancer, but was declared cancer-free in 2012.

On June 2, 2024, Jackson Lee announced that she had been diagnosed with pancreatic cancer, and was receiving treatments. She died at a hospital in Houston on July 19, 2024, at the age of 74.

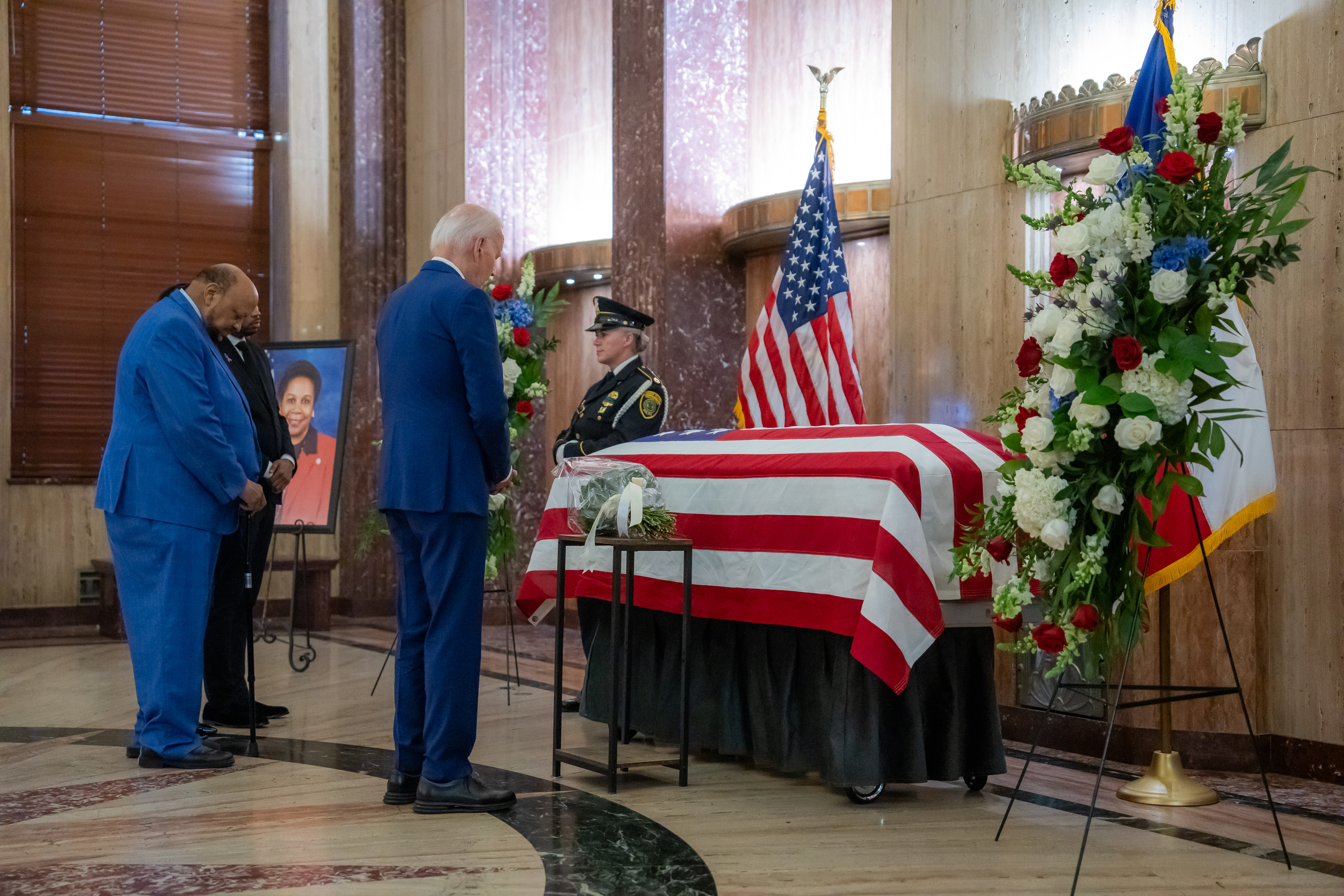
President Joe Biden paying his respects to Jackson Lee on July 29, 2024

Vice President Kamala Harris delivering the eulogy at the memorial service for Jackson Lee, August 1, 2024

President Joe Biden arrived in Houston on Monday, July 29, 2024, to pay respects to Jackson Lee. Jackson Lee would be the second person to ever lie in state at Houston City Hall. During Jackson Lee's funeral service at Houston's Fallbrook Church on August 1, 2024, Vice President Kamala Harris gave the eulogy. Speakers included Bill Clinton, his wife and former Secretary of State Hillary Clinton, and U.S. House Minority Leader Hakeem Jeffries.

== Awards and recognition ==
- Hilal-i-Pakistan (Crescent of Pakistan) Award (the highest civil award of Pakistan) from the President of Pakistan in 2020, recognizing her services to Pakistan.

== Electoral history ==
Texas's 18th congressional district, 1994
Party	Candidate	Votes	%
Democratic	Sheila Jackson Lee	84,790	73.5
Republican	Jerry Burley	28,153	24.4
Independent	J. Larry Snellings	1,278	1.1
Libertarian	George Hollenbeck	1,169	1.0
Total votes		115,390	100.0
Democratic hold			

Texas's 18th congressional district, 1996
Party	Candidate	Votes	%
Democratic	Sheila Jackson Lee (incumbent)	106,111	77.1
Republican	Larry White	13,956	10.1
Republican	Jerry Burley	7,877	5.7
Republican	George Young	5,332	3.9
Democratic	Mike Lamson	4,412	3.2
Total votes		137,688	100.0
Democratic hold			

Texas's 18th congressional district, 1998
Party	Candidate	Votes	%
Democratic	Sheila Jackson Lee (incumbent)	82,091	89.9
Libertarian	James Galvan	9,176	10.1
Total votes		91,267	100.0
Democratic hold			

Texas's 18th congressional district, 2000
Party	Candidate	Votes	%
Democratic	Sheila Jackson Lee (incumbent)	131,857	76.5
Republican	James Galvan	38,191	22.2
Libertarian	Colin Nankervis	2,330	1.4
Total votes		172,378	100.0
Democratic hold			

Texas's 18th congressional district, 2002
Party	Candidate	Votes	%
Democratic	Sheila Jackson Lee (incumbent)	99,161	76.9
Republican	Phillip Abbott	27,980	21.7
Libertarian	Brent Sullivan	1,785	1.4
Total votes		128,926	100.0
Democratic hold			

Texas's 18th congressional district, 2004
Party	Candidate	Votes	%
Democratic	Sheila Jackson Lee (incumbent)	136,018	88.9
Independent	Tom Bazan	9,787	6.4
Libertarian	Brent Sullivan	7,183	4.7
Total votes		152,988	100.0
Democratic hold			

Texas's 18th congressional district, 2006
Party	Candidate	Votes	%
Democratic	Sheila Jackson Lee (incumbent)	65,936	76.6
Republican	Ahmad Hassan	16,448	19.1
Libertarian	Patrick Warren	3,667	4.3
Total votes		86,051	100.0
Democratic hold			

Texas's 18th congressional district, 2008
Party	Candidate	Votes	%
Democratic	Sheila Jackson Lee (incumbent)	148,617	77.3
Republican	John Faulk	39,095	20.3
Libertarian	Mike Taylor	4,486	2.3
Total votes		192,198	100.0
Democratic hold			

Texas's 18th congressional district, 2010
Party	Candidate	Votes	%
Democratic	Sheila Jackson Lee (incumbent)	85,108	70.2
Republican	John Faulk	33,067	27.3
Libertarian	Mike Taylor	3,118	2.6
Write-in	Charles Meyer	28	0.0
Total votes		121,321	100.0
Democratic hold			

Texas's 18th congressional district, 2012
Party	Candidate	Votes	%
Democratic	Sheila Jackson Lee (incumbent)	146,223	75.0
Republican	Sean Seilbert	44,015	22.6
Libertarian	Christopher Barber	4,694	2.4
Total votes		194,932	100.0
Democratic hold			

Texas's 18th congressional district, 2014
Party	Candidate	Votes	%
Democratic	Sheila Jackson Lee (incumbent)	76,097	71.8
Republican	Sean Seibert	26,249	24.8
Independent	Vince Duncan	2,362	2.2
Green	Remington Alessi	1,302	1.2
Total votes		106,010	100.0
Democratic hold			

Texas's 18th congressional district, 2016
Party	Candidate	Votes	%
Democratic	Sheila Jackson Lee (incumbent)	150,157	73.5
Republican	Sean Seibert	48,306	23.6
Green	Remington Alessi	5,845	2.9
Total votes		204,308	100.0
Democratic hold			

Democratic Primary for Texas's 18th congressional district, 2018
Party	Candidate	Votes	%
Democratic	Sheila Jackson Lee (incumbent)	34,514	86.0
Democratic	Vince Duncan	5,604	14.0
Total votes		40,118	100.0

Texas's 18th congressional district, 2018
Party	Candidate	Votes	%
Democratic	Sheila Jackson Lee (incumbent)	138,704	75.2
Republican	Ava Pate	38,368	20.8
Libertarian	Luke Spencer	4,067	2.2
Independent	Vince Duncan	3,193	1.7
Total votes		184,332	100.0
Democratic hold			

Democratic Primary for Texas's 18th congressional district, 2020
Party	Candidate	Votes	%
Democratic	Sheila Jackson Lee (incumbent)	49,729	77.1
Democratic	Marc Flores	5,353	8.3
Democratic	Bimal Patel	2,456	3.8
Democratic	Jerry Ford Sr.	2,417	3.7
Democratic	Stevens Orozco	2,180	3.4
Democratic	Michael Allen	1,672	2.6
Democratic	Donovan Boson	709	1.1
Total votes		64,516	100.0

Texas's 18th congressional district, 2020
Party	Candidate	Votes	%
Democratic	Sheila Jackson Lee (incumbent)	180,952	73.3
Republican	Wendell Champion	58,033	23.5
Libertarian	Luke Spencer	4,514	1.8
Independent	Vince Duncan	3,396	1.2
Total votes		246,895	100.0
Democratic hold			

Texas's 18th congressional district, 2022
Party	Candidate	Votes	%
Democratic	Sheila Jackson Lee (incumbent)	110,511	70.7
Republican	Carmen Maria Montiel	40,941	26.2
Independent	Vince Duncan	2,766	1.8
Libertarian	Phil Kurtz	20,050	1.3
Total votes		156,268	100.0
Democratic hold			

Houston mayoral general election, 2023
Party	Candidate	Votes	%
Nonpartisan	John Whitmire	107,410	42.5
Nonpartisan	Sheila Jackson Lee	90,093	35.6
Nonpartisan	Gilbert Garcia	18,220	7.2
Nonpartisan	Jack Christie	17,364	6.9
Nonpartisan	Lee Kaplan	6,645	2.6
Nonpartisan	Robert Gallegos	2,679	1.1
Nonpartisan	M.J. Khan	2,478	1.0
Nonpartisan	Annie Garcia	1,979	0.8
Nonpartisan	Julian Martinez	1,813	0.7
Nonpartisan	Roy Vasquez	1,083	0.4
Nonpartisan	M. Griffin	674	0.3
Nonpartisan	Kathy Lee Tatum	532	0.2
Nonpartisan	David Lowy	368	0.1
Nonpartisan	Chanel Mbala	356	0.1
Nonpartisan	Naoufal Houjami	352	0.1
Nonpartisan	Gaylon Caldwell	331	0.1
Nonpartisan	B. Ivy	287	0.1
Nonpartisan	Robin Williams	95	0.0
Total votes		252,759	100.0

Houston mayoral runoff election, 2023
Party	Candidate	Votes	%
Nonpartisan	John Whitmire	129,495	64.4
Nonpartisan	Sheila Jackson Lee	71,523	35.6
Total votes		201,018	100.0

== See also ==
- List of African-American United States representatives
- List of members of the United States Congress who died in office (2000–present)
- Politics of Houston
- Women in the United States House of Representatives

== Notes ==
U.S. House of Representatives
Preceded by Craig Washington	Member of the U.S. House of Representatives from Texas's 18th congressional district 1995–2024	Succeeded by Erica Lee Carter
