= St. John's Evangelical Lutheran Church =

St. John's Evangelical Lutheran Church may refer to:

- St. John's Evangelical Lutheran Church (Ann Arbor, Michigan)
- St. John's Evangelical Lutheran Church (Corning, Missouri)
- St. John's Evangelical Lutheran Church (Passaic, New Jersey)
- St. John's Evangelical Lutheran Church (Livingston, New York)
- St. John's Evangelical Lutheran Church (Manhattan, New York)
- St. John's Evangelical Lutheran Church (Dola, Ohio)
- St. John's Evangelical Lutheran Church (Springfield, Ohio)
- St. John's Evangelical Lutheran Church (Stovertown, Ohio)
- St. John's Evangelical Lutheran Church (Culp, Pennsylvania)
- St. John's Evangelical Lutheran Church (Wharton, Texas)
- St. John's Evangelical Lutheran Church (Milwaukee, Wisconsin)

== See also ==
- Saint John Evangelical Lutheran Church (New Fane, Wisconsin)
