= Sharon, New York =

- Town
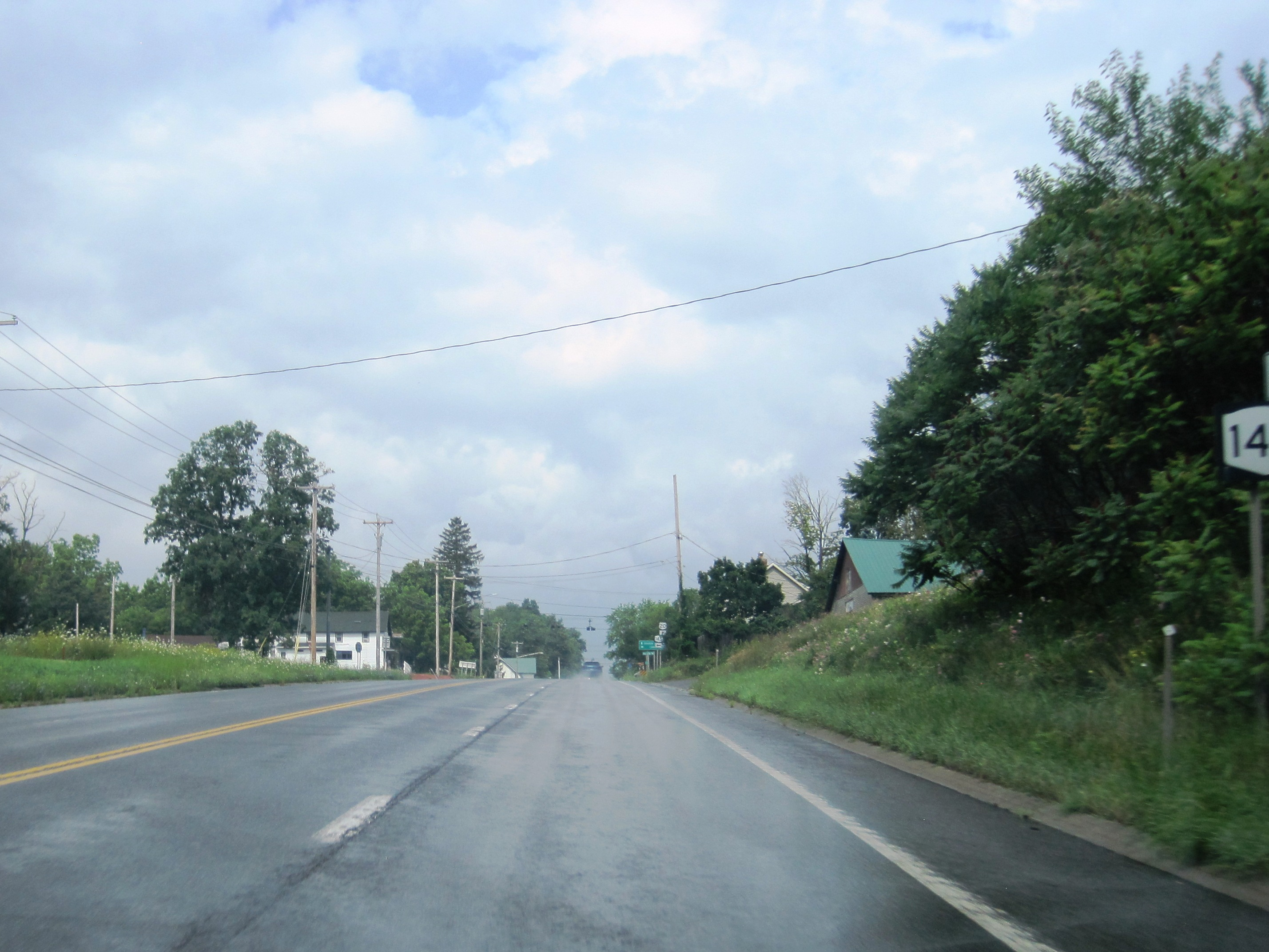
- US 20 westbound in the town and hamlet of Sharon

- Location in Schoharie County and the state of New York.
- Coordinates: 42°46′13″N 74°36′8″W
- Country: United States
- State: New York
- County: Schoharie

Area
  - Total: 39.16 sq mi (101.43 km^{2})
  - Land: 39.06 sq mi (101.17 km^{2})
  - Water: 0.097 sq mi (0.25 km^{2})
- Elevation: 1,470 ft (448 m)

Population (2020)
  - Total: 1,697
- Time zone: UTC-5 (Eastern (EST))
  - Summer (DST): UTC-4 (EDT)
- FIPS code: 36-66641
- GNIS feature ID: 0979485

Sharon is a town in Schoharie County, New York, United States. The population was 1,697 at the 2020 census. The town is named after a location in Connecticut, whence some early settlers came. The town of Sharon is in the northwestern corner of the county and is southwest of Amsterdam.

== History ==
The town was first settled around 1780. It was called "New Dorlach" from a location in Germany known to the early settlers while still in Otsego County.

In 1781 during the American Revolution, the Battle of Sharon was fought in the town between small contingents of colonial forces and Tories.

Sharon was created in 1797 from the town of Schoharie during the early organization of Schoharie County.

The opening of the Erie Canal in 1825 reduced road traffic on a major east-west turnpike through the town, leading to the decline of several early communities.

Sharon Springs was set apart from the town in 1871 through incorporation as a village.

== Geography ==
According to the United States Census Bureau, the town has a total area of 39.2 square miles (102 km^{2}), of which 39.1 square miles (101 km^{2}) is land and 0.1 square miles (0.26 km^{2}) (0.23%) is water.

The northern town line is the border of Montgomery County and the western town boundary is the border of Otsego County.

U.S. Route 20 is an east-west highway in the town. New York State Route 10, a north-south highway, intersects US-20 in Sharon Springs. New York State Route 145 has its northern terminus at US-20 in Sharon hamlet.

== Demographics ==
Historical population
Census	Pop.	Note	%±
1820	3,982		—
1830	4,247		6.7%
1840	2,520		−40.7%
1850	2,632		4.4%
1860	2,754		4.6%
1870	2,048		−25.6%
1880	2,591		26.5%
1890	2,202		−15.0%
1900	2,058		−6.5%
1910	1,825		−11.3%
1920	1,494		−18.1%
1930	1,319		−11.7%
1940	1,476		11.9%
1950	1,463		−0.9%
1960	1,405		−4.0%
1970	1,566		11.5%
1980	1,915		22.3%
1990	1,892		−1.2%
2000	1,843		−2.6%
2010	1,846		0.2%
2020	1,697		−8.1%
U.S. Decennial Census

As of the census of 2000, there were 1,843 people, 678 households, and 484 families residing in the town. The population density was 47.2 inhabitants per square mile (18.2/km^{2}). There were 838 housing units at an average density of 21.4 per square mile (8.3/km^{2}). The racial makeup of the town was 98.21% White, 0.60% African American, 0.16% Native American, 0.11% Asian, 0.16% from other races, and 0.76% from two or more races. Hispanic or Latino of any race were 1.25% of the population.

There were 678 households, out of which 33.0% had children under the age of 18 living with them, 57.2% were married couples living together, 9.0% had a female householder with no husband present, and 28.6% were non-families. 23.0% of all households were made up of individuals, and 10.9% had someone living alone who was 65 years of age or older. The average household size was 2.64 and the average family size was 3.10.

In the town, the population was spread out, with 27.4% under the age of 18, 6.8% from 18 to 24, 27.0% from 25 to 44, 22.5% from 45 to 64, and 16.3% who were 65 years of age or older. The median age was 38 years. For every 100 females, there were 99.5 males. For every 100 females age 18 and over, there were 90.6 males.

The median income for a household in the town was $36,413, and the median income for a family was $40,417. Males had a median income of $31,167 versus $25,972 for females. The per capita income for the town was $18,639. About 10.8% of families and 15.1% of the population were below the poverty line, including 20.8% of those under age 18 and 10.2% of those age 65 or over.

== Communities and locations in Sharon ==
- Argusville – A hamlet northeast of Sharon village, located on County Roads 5A and 5B.
- Beekman Corners – A location by the southern town line at County Road 5 and NY-10. It was one of the prominent communities in the early history of Sharon. The St. John's Lutheran Church is listed on the National Register of Historic Places.
- Engleville-- A location in the southwestern corner of the town, earlier "Engles Mills."
- Engleville Pond – A small lake north of Engleville.
- Gilbert Corners – A hamlet in the northeastern part of the town on County Road 34.
- Leesville – A location west of Sharon Springs, located on US-20. It was formerly a major business center in the town.
- Rockville – A former hamlet, now part of Sharon Springs.
- Sharon Springs – The Village of Sharon Springs is on NY-10, north of its intersection with US-20 in the western part of the town.
- Sharon – A hamlet near the eastern town line at the junction of routes US-20 and NY-145. It was once called "Moaks Hollow."
- Sharon Airport (K31) – A general aviation, turf-runway airport near Sharon Center.
- Sharon Center – A hamlet southeast of Sharon Springs located at the junction of US-20 and County Road 34.
- Staleyville – A location north of Sharon Springs on NY-10.
