= Stovertown, Ohio =

Unincorporated community in Ohio, U.S.

Coordinates: 39°50′29″N 81°59′12″W

Stovertown is an unincorporated community in Muskingum County, in the U.S. state of Ohio.

== History ==
Stovertown was laid out in 1832 by Samuel Stover, and named for him. A post office called Stovertown operated between 1850 and 1902.

St. John's Evangelical Lutheran Church in Stovertown is listed on the National Register of Historic Places.
