= Sabika Sheikh Firearm Licensing and Registration Act =

Proposed US law

- Long title: To provide for the licensing of firearm and ammunition possession and the registration of firearms, and to prohibit the possession of certain ammunition.
- Announced in: the 117th United States Congress
- Number of co-sponsors: 0

Legislative history
- Introduced in the House of Representatives as H.R. 127 by Sheila Jackson Lee (D–TX) on January 4, 2021; Committee consideration by United States House Committee on the Judiciary

The Sabika Sheikh Firearm Licensing and Registration Act is a proposed United States law that would require every firearm in the US to be licensed, insured, and accounted for at all times. The law would also impose a ban on any ammunition that is larger than .50 caliber (AE, BMG) The law expands US Code Title 18, Chapter 44.

The act is named in honor of Sabika Sheikh, a 17-year exchange student from Pakistan who was killed in the Santa Fe High School shooting.

== Background ==
The bill brings together some features of other gun control legislation, some merely proposed, and some implemented in other states. For example, the registration of firearms and the requirement for background checks to purchase ammunition are both features of California gun regulation.

== Legislative history ==
As of January 2, 2026:

Congress	Short title	Bill number(s)	Date introduced	Sponsor(s)	# of cosponsors	Latest status
116th Congress	Sabika Sheikh Firearm Licensing and Registration Act	H.R. 4081	July 26, 2019	Sheila Jackson Lee (D-TX)	0	Died in Committee
116th Congress	Sabika Sheikh Firearm Licensing and Registration Act	N/A	N/A	N/A	N/A	No bill introduced in the Senate
117th Congress	Sabika Sheikh Firearm Licensing and Registration Act	H.R. 127	January 4, 2021	Sheila Jackson Lee (D-TX)	0	Died in Committee.
117th Congress	Sabika Sheikh Firearm Licensing and Registration Act	N/A	N/A	N/A	N/A	No bill introduced in the Senate

== Provisions ==
=== Gun licensing requirements and paraphernalia restrictions ===
This bill establishes a process for the licensing and registration of firearms. It also prohibits the possession of certain ammunition and large capacity ammunition feeding devices.

First, the Bureau of Alcohol, Tobacco, Firearms and Explosives must establish (1) a licensing system for the possession of firearms or ammunition, and (2) a registration system for firearms.

In addition, the Department of Justice (DOJ) must establish and maintain a publicly available database of all registered firearms.

Thirdly, the bill generally prohibits and penalizes the possession of a firearm or ammunition unless the individual complies with licensing and registration requirements. Further, it prohibits the transfer of a firearm or ammunition to an unlicensed person.

Finally, it generally prohibits and penalizes (1) the possession of ammunition that is 0.50 caliber or greater, and (2) the possession of a large capacity ammunition feed device.

=== Insurance ===
The bill requires that a policy, be issued by the Attorney General that insures the person against liability for losses and damages resulting from the use of any firearm by the person during a 1-year policy period. The fees for a policy amount to $800 a year.

=== Licensing requirements ===
For a general license, the pursuant must:

1. Attain 21 years of age;
2. Undergo a criminal background check;
3. Undergo a psychological evaluation;
4. Successfully complete a training course, in the use, safety, and storage of firearms, that includes at least 24 hours of training;
5. Obtain an insurance policy issued by the Attorney General of the United States;

== See also ==
- List of bills in the 116th United States Congress
- List of bills in the 117th United States Congress
- Brady Handgun Violence Prevention Act
- Gun Control Act of 1968
- National Firearms Act
