= St. John's Lutheran Church (Beekman Corners, New York) =

Historic church in New York, United States

- U.S. National Register of Historic Places
- Location within New York Location within the United States
- Location: 6569 NY 10, Beekman Corners, New York
- Coordinates: 42°44′28″N 74°35′8″W
- Area: less than one acre
- Built: 1860
- Architectural style: Greek Revival
- NRHP reference No.: 08000864
- Added to NRHP: September 12, 2008

St. John's Lutheran Church, also known as Zion St. John's Lutheran Church, is a historic Lutheran church in Beekman Corners in Schoharie County, New York. It is a rectangular, gable roofed, timber-framed structure with narrow clapboard siding in the vernacular Greek Revival style. It was built in 1860 and features an open belfry with plan Tuscan columns that surmount the staged bell tower above the roof ridgeline. It was listed on the National Register of Historic Places in 2008.

The congregation had been founded in 1745, making it the oldest in the county. The first church was completed around 1787. The new church was completed in 1861 from material salvaged from the original church, with a belfry and bell added about 10 years later. The congregation dwindled in the late 20th century and was consolidated with that of Zion Church of Seward in 1997; the last service was held July 10, 2011. In 2016 the bell was donated to the Sharon Historical Society, and is now on display outside its museum complex.
