= Transportation Worker Identification Credential =

Identification card

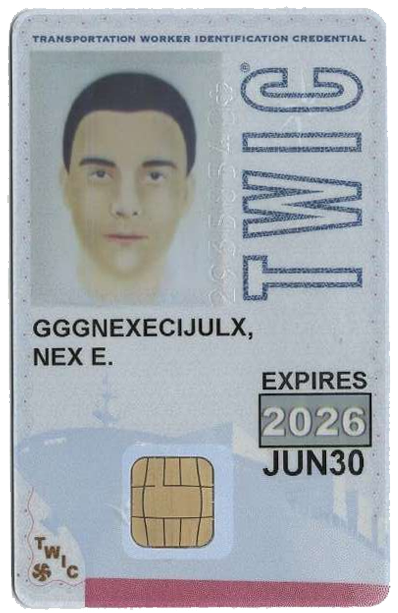
A sample NEXGEN TWIC card

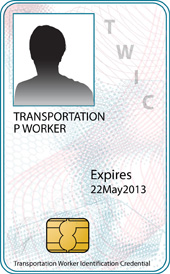
A sample Transportation Worker Identification Credential.

The Transportation Worker Identification Credential (or TWIC) program is a Transportation Security Administration (TSA) and U.S. Coast Guard initiative in the United States. The TWIC program provides a tamper-resistant biometric credential to maritime workers requiring unescorted access to secure areas of port facilities, outer continental shelf facilities, certain manufacturing facilities, and vessels regulated under the Maritime Transportation Security Act of 2002, or MTSA, and all U.S. Coast Guard credentialed merchant mariners. As of May 2014, there were 2,999,058 people enrolled in the program. Those seeking unescorted access to secure areas aboard affected vessels, and all Coast Guard credentialed merchant mariners, must obtain a TWIC. The new measures were fully implemented on April 15, 2009. To obtain a TWIC, an individual must provide biographic and biometric information such as fingerprints, sit for a digital photograph and successfully pass a security threat assessment conducted by TSA.

The issued card contains a computer chip, known as an Integrated Circuit Chip (ICC), which stores the holder's information and biometric data. The chip can be read by inserting it into a reader or holding it near a "contactless" reader. There is also a magnetic strip (similar to a credit card) and a linear barcode on the back as alternative reading methods.

== Maritime sector ==
While the TWIC may be implemented across other transportation modes in the future, the TWIC Final Rule, published in the Federal Register on January 25, 2007, sets forth regulatory requirements to implement this program in the maritime mode first.

The program's goals are:

- Positively identify authorized individuals who require unescorted access to secure areas of the nation's maritime transportation system;
- Determine the eligibility of an individual to be authorized unescorted access to secure areas of the maritime transportation system;
- Enhance security by ensuring that unauthorized individuals are denied unescorted access to secure areas of the nation's maritime transportation system; and,
- Identify individuals who fail to maintain their eligibility qualifications after being permitted unescorted access to secure areas of the nation's maritime transportation system and revoke the individual's permissions.

Workers required to obtain a TWIC include credentialed merchant mariners, port facility employees, longshoremen, truck drivers, and others requiring unescorted access to secure areas of security-regulated maritime facilities and vessels.

== Other transportation sectors ==
In addition to the maritime sector, the TWIC may be required in the future for other security-sensitive transportation sectors, such as airports, railroads, chemical plants, and refineries. One chemical manufacturing industry representative says it's only a matter of time before the entire manufacturing industry requires workers to have TWIC cards.

== Security threat assessment ==
Each TWIC applicant undergoes a security threat assessment. The assessment considers convictions, arrest warrants, and indictments for certain offenses and other background information. In the case of arrests that do not indicate the disposition, the applicant will be notified by TSA, and the applicant must provide TSA with written proof that the arrest did not result in conviction for the offense.

=== Permanent disqualifying criminal offenses ===
An applicant is permanently disqualified if convicted of the following felonies: Espionage, sedition, treason, terrorism, (Note: As defined in 18 U.S.C. § 2332b(g)) a crime involving a transportation security incident, (Note: A transportation security incident is a security incident resulting in a significant loss of life, environmental damage, transportation system disruption, or economic disruption in a particular area, as defined in 46 U.S.C. 70101. The term "economic disruption" does not include a work stoppage or other employee-related action not related to terrorism and resulting from an employer-employee dispute.) improper transportation of hazardous material, unlawful acts involving explosives, murder, bomb threats, serious racketeering offenses, or attempts/conspiracy to commit these acts.

=== Interim disqualifiying criminal offenses ===
An applicant is disqualified for a period of time for other convictions, if the applicant was convicted in the past seven years and/or released from incarceration resulting from conviction within the past five years, for: Unlawful acts involving firearms, extortion, fraud (does not include welfare fraud and passing bad checks), bribery, smuggling, immigration violations, drug distribution/importation, arson, kidnapping, rape, assault with intent to kill, robbery, fraudulent entry into a seaport, and lesser racketeering offenses, or attempts/conspiracy to commit these acts.

=== Other parts of the security threat assessment ===
In addition to criminal offenses, TSA will determine immigration status and look for records indicating mental incapacity. TSA may conduct other analyses, including searching international databases, terrorist watchlists, National Crime Information Center (NCIC), other databases, and may search to see if other extensive foreign or domestic criminal convictions exist.

== Issues ==
=== Loopholes ===
Due to U.S. Coast Guard Policy, persons can still gain access to facilities and vessels without possessing a TWIC card, for up to 30 days, if their employer applies to the TSA (Online) for such a temporary exemption. The employee then carries a print out of their approval along with State issued ID such as a drivers license. There is no provision for validation of this printed document but the employee is required to have "Escorted Access" which allows entry but prohibits them from certain areas without another employee escorting them.

=== Rollout ===
The Government Accountability Office has said the TWIC program has suffered from lack of oversight and poor coordination. Delays regarding developing and implementing card reader technology have meant that for the initial period TWIC cards will not be used in card readers. Additionally, a number of organizations have complained at the financial impact the program will have on already highly regulated industries. As of Jan 2016 vessels and waterfront facilities were still not required to possess TWIC card readers due to delays in the rule making for the devices and therefore a person with an invalidated TWIC card may still be able to gain un-escorted access to facilities and vessels due to an inability to verify cards on site.

=== Delays to applicants ===
According to a report by the National Employment Law Project, some TWIC applicants have experienced significant delays. Specifically, many applicants that receive initial denials based on background check returns face waits of six to eight months to complete the process to obtain a TWIC. Over 10,000 applicants out of the 1.5 million port workers could not work for an average of 69 days because they had not obtained a TWIC by the implementation date.

=== Faulty TWIC Cards ===
In November 2011, the TSA announced that approximately 26,000 TWIC cards issued before April 5, 2011 would not work when inserted into a TWIC card reader. Each card contains a Federal Agency Smart Credential Number (FASC-N), which uniquely identifies each card in Federal databases, encoded on its ICC. On the faulty cards, the FASC-N has not been fully encoded, causing the readers to view the card as an invalid card.

The agency has posted a list online with the serial numbers of affected cards. They say that they will replace the faulty cards at no further cost to the affected individual.

=== Criticism ===
Critics assert that the program has cost over $420 million and has little to show for it. A 2013 GAO report found the TWIC card reader pilot program results to be unreliable and questioned "the program's premise and effectiveness in enhancing security." Rep. John Mica (R-FL) has called them "at best no more useful than library cards.

=== Legislation ===
On July 28, 2014, the United States House of Representatives passed the Essential Transportation Worker Identification Credential Assessment Act (H.R. 3202; 113th Congress), a bill that would direct the United States Department of Homeland Security to assess the effectiveness of the TWIC program. The bill would require an independent assessment of how well the TWIC program improves security and reduces risks at the facilities and vessels it is responsible for. The evaluation would include a cost-benefit analysis and information on alternate technologies that could be used.

== See also ==
- Maritime Transportation Security Act of 2002
- Merchant Mariner Credential
- SAFE Port Act
- Common Access Card - A similar card for the US DOD
