= Maritime Transportation Security Act of 2002 =

United States Law

- Long title: An act to amend the Merchant Marine Act, 1936, to establish a program to ensure greater security for United States seaports, and for other purposes.
- Enacted by: the 107th United States Congress

Citations
- Public law: Pub. L. 107–295 (text) (PDF)

Codification
- Acts amended: Merchant Marine Act of 1936
- Titles amended: 5, 14, 16, 19, 26, 31, 33, 46, 49, 50

Legislative history
- Introduced in the Senate by Fritz Hollings (D‑SC) on July 20, 2001; Passed the Senate on Dec. 20, 2001 (voice vote); Passed the House of Representatives on June 4, 2002 (without objection); Signed into law by President George W. Bush on Nov. 25, 2002

The Maritime Transportation Security Act of 2002 (MTSA) is an Act of Congress enacted by the 107th United States Congress to address port and waterway security. It was signed into law by President George W. Bush on November 25, 2002.

This law is the U.S. implementation of the International Ship and Port Facility Security Code (ISPS). Its full provisions came into effect on July 1, 2004. It requires vessels and port facilities to conduct vulnerability assessments and develop security plans that may include passenger, vehicle and baggage screening procedures; security patrols; establishing restricted areas; personnel identification procedures; access control measures; and/or installation of surveillance equipment. The Act creates a consistent security program for all the nation's ports to better identify and deter threats.

Developed using risk-based methodology, the MTSA security regulations focus on those sectors of maritime industry that have a higher risk of involvement in a transportation security incident, including various tank vessels, barges, large passenger vessels, cargo vessels, towing vessels, offshore oil and gas platforms, and port facilities that handle certain kinds of dangerous cargo or service the vessels listed above.

MTSA also required the establishment committees in all the nation's ports to coordinate the activities of all port stakeholders, including other federal, local and state agencies, industry and the boating public. These groups, called Area Maritime Security Committees, are tasked with collaborating on plans to secure their ports so that the resources of an area can be best used to deter, prevent and respond to terror threats.

The U.S. Coast Guard issued regulations to enact the provisions of the Act and to align domestic regulations with the maritime security standards of SOLAS and the ISPS Code. The regulations are found in Title 33 of the Code of Federal Regulations, Parts 101 through 107. Part 104 contains vessel security regulations, including some provisions that apply to foreign ships in U.S. waters.

== Background and History ==
Prior to September 11, 2001, maritime security, while being considered as a necessary element of the management of the maritime community, was a relatively small priority in actual application. Historically, the two major exceptions to this statement were the two World Wars, where port security and vessel protection were major concerns because of the substantial role the maritime community had in prosecuting the war effort. However, the terrorist attacks in 2001 altered the maritime security culture in the country by making maritime security a part of the normal operating environment.

Among the first laws applied to maritime security was the Espionage Act of 1917. This was a broad brush law that extended far beyond the maritime realm to encompass any and all acts of sedition against the United States, and came at the height of World War I. Also during World War I, the U. S. Coast Guard first designated officers as Captains of the Port. Most were senior officers who oversaw the loading of cargoes, particularly dangerous ones such as munitions. Over time and with the threats and actual attacks of World War II and the Cold War environment, maritime security became better defined. Much of the increased responsibility for maritime security and clarification of roles resided in the Coast Guard's Captains of the Port.

The Safety of Naval Vessels Act of 1941 authorized them to control the anchorage and movement of any vessel in the navigable waters of the United States to ensure the safety and security of any U. S. naval vessel. The Magnuson Act and Executive Order 10173 provided broad power to order vessel movements, place guards on vessels and even take possession of those vessels in United States internal and territorial waters. This Act authorized the Coast Guard to conduct duties it had carried out during both World Wars to ensure the security of U.S. ports "from subversive or clandestine attacks". Other laws over the next fifty years further refined and broadened the authorities of the Captain of the Port to include routine port and shipping controls and management, and pollution response.

In many cases, these acts were modified over time to address security concerns. As an example, the Port and Tanker Safety Act of 1978, which later became known as the Ports and Waterways Safety Act, was enacted to improve the navigation and vessel safety and protection of the marine environment brought about by increased commercial traffic and poorly maintained tankships. It authorized increased inspections of vessels and required compliance with enhanced safety standards coming into effect at that time. It also contained language that addressed planning and protective measures for the nation's ports, waterways and marine environment.

In 1986, additional language through amendments were implemented in the Omnibus Diplomatic Security and Anti-Terrorism Act of 1986, which authorized the Coast Guard to carry out or require measures, including "the establishment of security and safety zones...to prevent or respond to acts of terrorism" against a person, vessel, or structure that is 1)subject to the jurisdiction of the United States and located within or adjacent to the marine environment or 2) a vessel of the United States or an individual on board that vessel. It also authorized the Coast Guard to recruit and train regular and reserve members in the techniques of preventing and responding to acts of terrorism. Not by coincidence, the hijacking of the passenger ship ACHILLE LAURO had occurred the previous year. Concerns for maritime terrorism rose and fell rather quickly.

There is both a history and reasonably extensive library of laws that have recognized the threat of maritime terrorism, typically from a well-identified enemy, and fairly complete set of authorities to prosecute action against it. However, all said, the general concern for maritime security is that it is still a small and not usually conscious portion of the operational management of the maritime community, and that threats to the United States ports and vessel traffic are reasonably inconsequential.

== See also ==
- Federal Maritime Security Coordinator
- Port security
- SAFE Port Act
- Transportation Worker Identification Credential
