= St. John's Evangelical Lutheran Church (Stovertown, Ohio) =

Historic church in Ohio, United States

- U.S. National Register of Historic Places
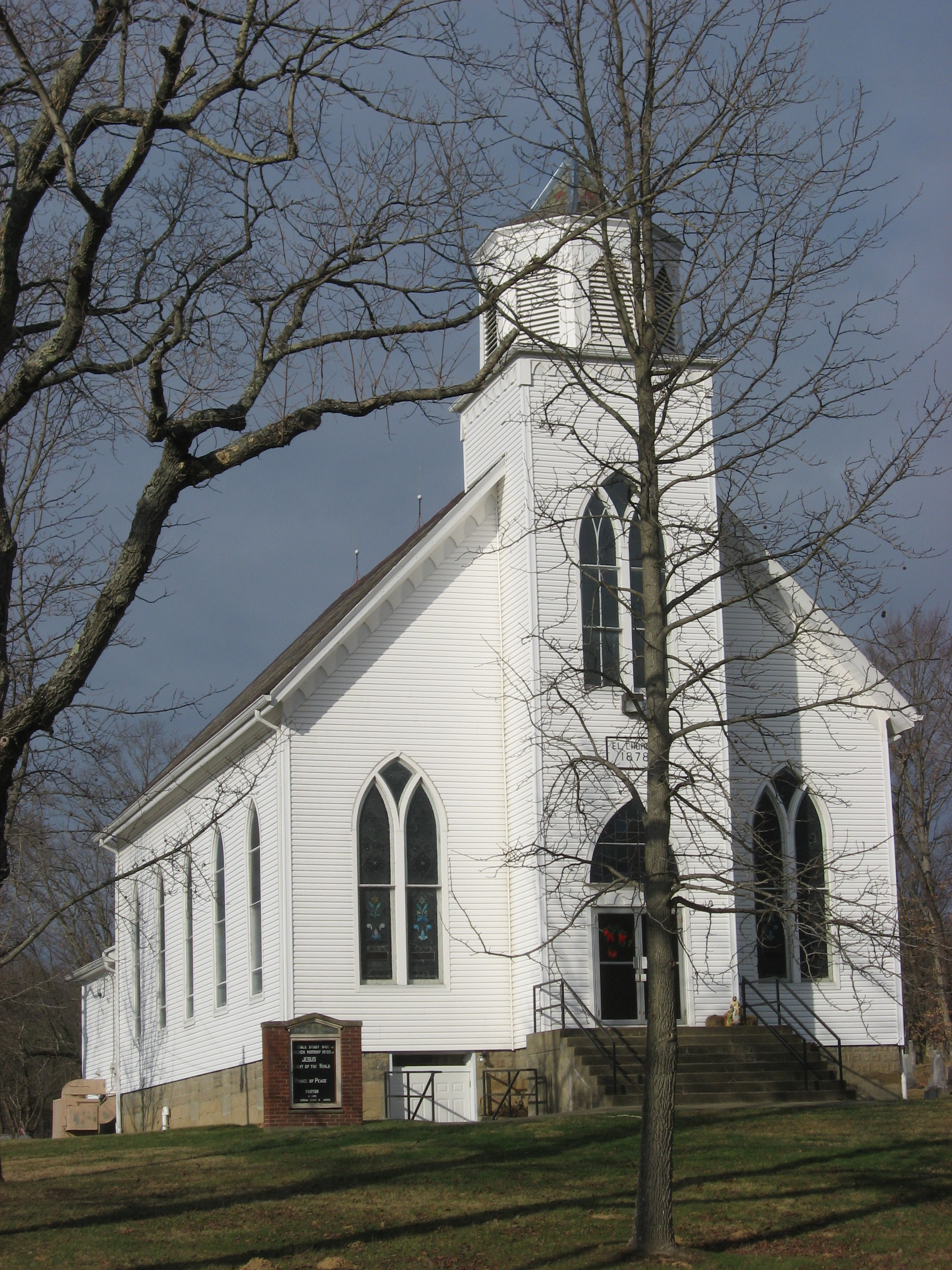
- Front and southern side

- Location within Ohio Location within the United States
- Nearest city: Stovertown, Ohio
- Coordinates: 39°49′58″N 81°59′16″W
- Area: 1.9 acres (0.77 ha)
- Built: 1878
- Architect: Walter, George W.
- Architectural style: Gothic
- NRHP reference No.: 80003189
- Added to NRHP: January 3, 1980

St. John's Evangelical Lutheran Church is a historic church in Stovertown, Ohio.

== History ==
In 1819, a church was constructed on John George Swingle's land by William Foster, Traveling pastor. This church was utilized until 1831, when a new church was constructed half a mile south of Stovertown at its present location. A simple, neat frame chapel was constructed for $1,000 in 1851. The current church was constructed in 1878 and is still in use today. It was added to the National Register in 1980
