= QMS =

QMS may refer to:

== Arts ==
- "QMS", a song by T-Love on Ninja Tune's 2000 compilation album Xen Cuts
- Quicksilver Messenger Service, an American psychedelic rock band, formed in 1965
  - Quicksilver Messenger Service (album), released 1968
- "Queen Mary's Song" by Edward Elgar in 1889
- Quest for the Mighty Sword (AKA Ator III: The Hobgoblin, Troll 3), a 1990 Italian film by Joe D'Amato
- The Queen of My Self: Stepping Into Sovereignty in Midlife, a 2005 book by Donna Henes

== Business ==
- Quality management system
- Queue management system
- Quota Management Service, a product of the International Business and Economic Research Center
- Quota Management System, a method of regulating catch in a fishery
- Quarry Management System, developed by Tamil Nadu Minerals Limited

== Government ==
- Quality Meat Scotland
- Quartermaster Sergeant, a type of appointment in the British Army and Royal Marines
- Brazilian Portuguese: Qualificações Militares de Sargentos, the military qualifications for warrant officers and sergeants in the Brazilian Army

== Media ==
- QMS Media, an Australian advertising company, owner of MediaWorks New Zealand, and owned by Nine Entertainment
- CKKQ-FM § The Q Morning Show

== People ==
- Qays ibn Musahir al-Saidawi, an envoy of Husayn ibn Ali
- Qi-Man Shao (Chinese: 邵启满; born 1962), Chinese statistician
- Qiane Matata-Sipu (born 1985 or 1986), New Zealand community worker, public speaker, and journalist

=== Politicians ===
- Quintus Mucius Scaevola (disambiguation), Roman Republic
- Qutbuddin Mubarak Shah (Qutb-ud-din Mubarak Shah I; c. 1299 – 1320), 15th Sultan of Delhi
- Queen Mary of Scots (disambiguation), Scotland, present-day United Kingdom
- Quhtan Muhammad al-Sha'bi (Arabic: قحطان محمد الشعبي; 1920–1981), first President of the People's Republic of South Yemen

== Places ==
- Qalʽeh-ye Mirza Shah, a village in Badakhshan province, Afghanistan
- Qila Mihan Singh, a town in Gujranwala district, Punjab province, Pakistan
- Qalaat al-Madiq Subdistrict (Arabic: ناحية قلعة المضيق), a nahiyah in al-Suqaylabiyah district, Hama governorate, Syria
- Quide Millath Street, Melapalayam, Tirunelveli City, Tamil Nadu, India

=== Iranian villages ===
- Qaleh-ye Mirza Soleyman (Persian: قلعه ميرزاسليمان, romanized: Qal‘eh-ye Mīrzā Soleymān), Kharqan rural district, Bastam district, Shahrud county, Semnan province
- Qeshlaq-e Moqaddam Shabandeh (Persian: قشلاق مقدم شابنده, romanized: Qeshlāq-e Moqaddam Shābandeh), Garamduz rural district, Garamduz district, Khoda Afarin county, East Azerbaijan province
- Qeshlaq-e Mir Soltanlu (Persian: قشلاق ميرسلطانلو), Arshaq-e Markazi rural district, Arshaq district, Meshgin Shahr county, Ardabil province

== Schools ==
- Harold L. Qualters Middle School, grades 6–8, Mansfield, Massachusetts, United States
- Queensborough Middle School, grades 5–8, School District 40 New Westminster, British Columbia, Canada
- Queen Margaret's School, ECE (preschool) – grade 12, Independent Day & Boarding school, Duncan, British Columbia, Canada
- Quartermaster School — see United States Army Quartermaster Corps
- Queen Mary School (disambiguation)

== Science and technology ==
- Quadrupole mass spectrometer, a scientific instrument
- Quantitative mass spectrometry (qMS)
- Quantum Markov semigroup, mathematical structure that describes the dynamics in a Markovian open quantum system
- Quick Media Switching in HDMI
- qeep messaging service

=== Tech companies ===
- Quality Micro Systems, founded in 1979 and merged with Minolta's printer division in 2000 to form Minolta-QMS
- Quantitative Micro Software, developed the EViews statistical package

== Sports ==
- Queen Mary Stakes, a horse race in Great Britain
- QMS Sport, the Back Bottom Sponsor of the Manly Warringah Sea Eagles in 2018

== Structures ==
- Quezon Memorial Shrine (Filipino: Pambansang Pang-alaalang Dambana ni Quezon), in Quezon City, Philippines
- QMS Top Tower, Đại Mỗ ward, Hà Đông district, Hanoi, in the list of tallest buildings in Vietnam

== Transportation ==
- Qatar Motor Show, a trade show
- Quantock Motor Services, a bus operator in England
- Qods (Malek Shahr) Metro Station (Isfahan), in Iran
- Queen Mary's Shallop, a British royal barge
- Kurdish: QMŞ (Arabic: قامشلو, Syriac: ܩ ܡ ܫ ܐ), the code for Qamishli District on vehicle registration plates of Syria § AANES (Rojava)

== Other uses ==
- Qazi–Markouizos syndrome (AKA dysharmonic skeletal maturation-muscular fiber disproportion syndrome, Puerto Rican infant hypotonia syndrome), a medical condition
- Ugaritic: qms, lit. 'garment', a cognate of English "chemise", speculatively included in the list of English words of Semitic origin

== See also ==
- QM (disambiguation)
