= Secure Freight Initiative =

The Secure Freight Initiative (SFI) is a Department of Homeland Security (DHS) program and part of the SAFE Port Act of 2006. It uses non-intrusive Inspection (NII) and radiation detection technology. It also gathers data to measure trade activity for risk-management and protection of United States international trade. The Secure Freight Initiative builds on the current partnership between the Container Security Initiative (CSI) and the Department of Energy's Megaports Initiative.

The two sides of the Secure Freight Initiative are: the Container Security Initiative, also known as the International Container Security scanning project and the Importer Security Filing Program. A third pillar was to have been the Global Trade Exchange (GTX), a data acquisition program which was funded as part of the Homeland Security Budget for 2008 and 2009, but is delayed and remains under study.

The Secure Freight Initiative was kicked off in end-April 2007, with the commencement of the International Container Security project. The ICS is in pilot phases and is working to develop appropriate means to verify the safety of transport containers, using scanning technology including radiation portal monitors, non-intrusive imaging equipment, and optical character recognition systems. ICS is being implemented in foreign ports; Southampton (United Kingdom), Port Qasim (Pakistan), and Puerto Cortez (Honduras) will become the first seaports to implement the Secure Freight Initiative (SFI) in October 2007. These ports began by scanning all maritime containers destined for the United States for nuclear or other radiological materials. Data from these systems is then provided to U.S. officials at U.S. Customs and Border Protection's National Targeting Center for analysis.

A second leg of the SFI came to light vis-a-vis the new Importer Security Filing (ISF) program, also known as "10+2,". The ISF, "10+2" program was put forth as a risk-management program, part of the DHS strategy to assess and identify high-risk U.S.-bound maritime transport shipments.
