= James Giermanski =

American security specialist

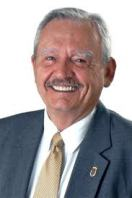
- Military career
- Commands: Director, Office of Naval Intelligence
- Other work: Specialist in supply chain security and container shipping programs

James Giermanski is a specialist in supply chain security and container shipping programs of the U.S. Department of Homeland Security. He is a former U.S. Air Force Office of Special Investigations (Col. ret.) and a former FBI agent.

== Biography ==
Giermanski is an expert focused on security operations in the global supply chain, who is concerned with respective contributions of governmental and nongovernmental stakeholders to this worldwide concern. Global Supply Chain Security explores the potential impact of port-related catastrophic events in the United States and their effects worldwide, concentrating, in particular, on the United States' contribution to global container security.

A former military officer, and FBI agent, Giermanski is a frequent commentator on container security issues and weapons defense matters, particularly such as concerns border and customs work on supply chain security. Giermanski taught at Texas A&M University, serving as Regents Professor and as an adjunct graduate faculty member at the University of North Carolina at Charlotte. He was Director of Transportation and Logistics Studies, Center for the Study of Western Hemispheric Trade at Texas A&M International University.

Giermanski serves a visiting scholar at the Air Force Doctrine Development and Education Center, an Air Force think tank at Maxwell Air Force Base.

== Education ==
- Master, University of North Carolina
- Master, Florida International University
- Doctorate, University of Miami
- Graduate, U.S. Air Command and Staff College

== See also ==
- Automated Targeting System
- U.S. Customs and Border Protection
- Global Trade Exchange
- Denise Krepp
