= World Customs Journal =

- Language: English

Publication details
- History: 2007–present
- Publisher: Centre for and Excise Studies, University of Münster, International Network of Customs Universities
- Frequency: Biannually

Standard abbreviations
- ISO 4: World Cust. J.

Indexing
- ISSN: 1834-6707

Links
- Journal homepage

The World Customs Journal is a peer-reviewed academic journal that is published twice a year. It was launched at the World Customs Organization's second annual PICARD conference, held in Brussels on 27-28 March 2007.

The World Customs Journal covers all aspects of the roles and responsibilities of customs. Special issues have covered the topics of supply chain security and trade facilitation.

The journal is published by the Centre for and Excise Studies, Charles Sturt University, Australia, and the University of Münster, Germany, in association with the International Network of Customs Universities.

== Special issues ==
- Security: Volume 1, Number 2, September 2007
- Trade Facilitation: Volume 2, Number 1, April 2008
- Capacity building: Volume 2, Number 2, October 2008
- The use of information and communications technology (ICT) in the cross-border environment: Volume 3, Number 1, April 2009
