= Jon D. Glassman =

American diplomat (born 1944)

Jon David Glassman
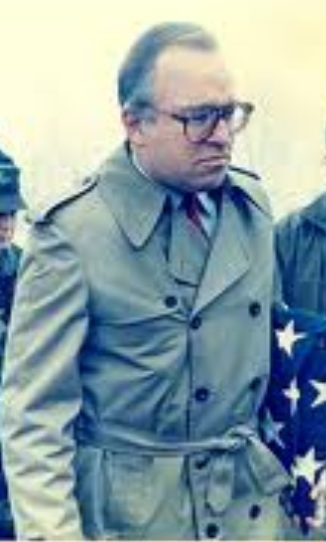
- Glassman in 1989
- Born: January 8, 1944 (age 82); New York City, New York, U.S.
- Known for: U.S. State Department official who authored the white paper on Communist intervention in El Salvador; also Chargé d'Affairs during U.S. Embassy closing in Kabul, Afghanistan, 1989.

Jon David Glassman (born January 8, 1944) is a former U.S. State Department official. He is best known for having authored the "White Paper" on Communist intervention in El Salvador published by the U.S. State Department in 1981. Glassman also served as Deputy National Security Advisor for former vice president Dan Quayle.

Glassman currently works as Director of Government Operations, at Northrop Grumman Corporation.

== Biography ==
Glassman was born in New York City on January 8, 1944. He graduated from the University of Southern California (B.F.S., 1965) and Columbia University (M.A., 1968; Ph.D., 1976).

=== White Paper on El Salvador ===
On February 23, 1981, the U.S. State Department released Communist Interference in El Salvador: Documents Demonstrating Communist Support of the Salvadoran Insurgency, also known as "the White Paper". The document was used as justification for U.S. intervention in Nicaragua. Critics charged that the technique deployed by the White Paper was to correlate events in El Salvador into alleged examples of Soviet and Cuban military involvement. The White Paper was claimed to be part of a propaganda effort to diverting attention from U.S. support for a repressive regime by creating a false threat of communist insurgency. Glassman was the principal architect of the White Paper.

On June 9, 1981, Wall Street Journal reporter Jonathan Kwitny published an article based on a three-hour interview with Glassman. In the article, Glassman admitted "mistakes and guessing" by the government's intelligence analysts who translated and explained the guerrilla documents. The White Paper, supposedly based on nineteen captured guerrilla documents, was accepted as fact by the American press, with myriad U.S. government follow-up reports of plans for countering the activities alleged in the report. Yet Kwitny noted that a closer reading of the documents in the White Paper indicates that they were not written by guerrilla leaders. In the interview with Kwitny, Glassman admitted that most of the statistics cited in the document were extrapolated, and most of the information put forth in the documents wasn't in the purportedly captured documents at all. Kwitny noted that "A close reading of the white paper indicates… that its authors probably were making a determined effort to create a 'selling' document, no matter how slim the background material".

Other press-reports soon followed with negative assessments of the White Paper. The State Department countered by defending the conclusions of the report; Glassman refused to provide further interviews to the press.

Notwithstanding criticism of the documents, the U.S. Congress presented a position very similar to the White Paper in 1982. This led critics to count the White Paper as one of the more devastatingly success examples of U.S. officially run propaganda-based manipulation.

=== U.S. Chargé d'Affaires, Kabul ===
Glassman was chargé d'affaires at the U.S. Embassy in Kabul, when it closed its doors when the Russians pulled out of Afghanistan in 1989.

Glassman had been head of a small group of diplomats who remained in the embassy during the last day of fighting between the Mujahadeen and the Soviet-backed Afghan régime. In February 1989, Secretary of State James Baker decided to withdraw this small group of diplomats, so that they did not become hostages, and to otherwise protect them from harm.

Glassman had long been a supporter of arming Arab countries as a policy tool in the context of the Cold War. He had published a book on the topic in 1975.

=== U.S. Ambassador, Paraguay ===
Glassman was named by George H.W. Bush as Ambassador to Paraguay on January 10, 1991. He was recalled to the U.S. by the State Department for what was cited as his 'abrasive style'.

=== U.S. Justice Department Investigation ===
On July 6, 2001, Glassman received $10,000, as part of a civil settlement to resolve allegations that he violated the post-employment conflict of interest law applicable to federal employees.

Prior to the violation, Glassman had served as the deputy for international coordination of the Task Force for Military Stabilization in the Balkans (Task Force), of the U.S. Department of State. At the time of the violation, Glassman was working for Northrop Grumman and was promoting air defense radar systems.

=== Cargo terrorism ===
In the post 9/11 era, Glassman, in his role at Northrop Grumman, promoted defense and national security projects. Some of these involved collecting data from maritime shipments, in lieu of 100 per cent scanning of containers, this, a policy enshrined in the Container Security Initiative (CSI).

One cargo terrorism sub-projects Glassman promoted was the Global Trade Exchange which Glassman promoted at various counterterrorism seminars in the Latin American (CICTC) and Asian (ASEAN) contexts. In February 2008, the Global Trade Exchange was presented by Northrop Grumman in Jordan, as a viable pilot project.

The Global Trade Exchange was funded as part of the Implementing Recommendations of the 9/11 Commission Act of 2007 as a project funded under the budget for the Department of Homeland Security.

=== Missile defense ===
Glassman has been instrumental in forwarding missile defense systems through the NATO and European area, as well as Africa, in his role with Northrop Grumman, in conjunction with the U.S. National Defense University.

=== 2020 U.S. Presidential Election ===
In 2020, Glassman, along with over 130 other former Republican national security officials, signed a statement that asserted that President Trump was unfit to serve another term, and "To that end, we are firmly convinced that it is in the best interest of our nation that Vice President Joe Biden be elected as the next President of the United States, and we will vote for him."

== See also ==
- Propaganda in the United States

Diplomatic posts
Preceded by James Maurice Ealum; Acting	U.S. ambassador to Afghanistan; Acting; 1983– 1986	Succeeded by Ryan Crocker; Acting; 2002
Preceded by Timothy Lathrop Towell	United States ambassador to Paraguay; 1991–1994	Succeeded by Robert Edward Service
