= Jetmate =

Jetmate or JetMate may refer to:

- NEC Jetmate, a series of NEC thermal inkjet printers in the 1980s
- Transcend JetMate, a laser printer driver to render Chinese characters by Transcend in ca. 1988
