= Open Trusted Technology Provider Standard =

The Open Trusted Technology Provider Standard (O-TTPS) (Mitigating Maliciously Tainted and Counterfeit Products) is a standard of The Open Group that has also been approved for publication as an Information Technology standard by the International Organization of Standardization and the International Electrotechnical Commission through ISO/IEC JTC 1 and is now also known as ISO/IEC 20243:2015. The standard consists of a set of guidelines, requirements, and recommendations that align with best practices for global supply chain security and the integrity of commercial off-the-shelf (COTS) information and communication technology (ICT) products. It is currently in version 1.1. A Chinese translation has also been published.

== Background ==
The O-TTPS was developed in response to a changing landscape and the increased sophistication of cybersecurity attacks worldwide. The intent is to help providers build products with integrity and to enable their customers to have more confidence in the technology products they buy. Private and public sector organizations rely largely on COTS ICT products to run their operations. These products are often produced globally, with development and manufacturing taking place at different sites in multiple countries. The O-TTPS is designed to mitigate the risk of counterfeit and tainted components and to help assure product integrity and supply chain security throughout the lifecycle of the product.

The Open Group's Trusted Technology Forum (OTTF) is a vendor-neutral international forum that uses a formal consensus based process for collaboration and decision making about the creation of standards and certification programs for information technology, including the O-TTPS. In the forum, ICT providers, integrators and distributors work with organizations and governments to develop standards that specify secure engineering and manufacturing methods along with supply chain security practices.

The Implementation Guide to Leveraging Open Trusted Technology Providers in the Supply Chain provides mapping between The National Institute of Standards and Technology (NIST) Cybersecurity Framework and related organizational practices listed in the O-TTPS. NIST referenced O-TTPS in their NIST Special Publication 800-161 "Supply Chain Risk Management Practices for Federal Information Systems and Organizations" that provides guidance to federal agencies on identifying, assessing, and mitigating ICT supply chain risks at all levels of their organizations.

== Purpose ==
The standard, developed by industry experts within the Forum, specifies organizational practices that provide assurance against maliciously tainted and counterfeit products throughout the COTS ICT product lifecycle. The lifecycle described in the standard encompasses the following phases: design, sourcing, build, fulfillment, distribution, sustainment, and disposal.

== Measurement and Certification ==
Organizations can be certified for their conformance to the standard through the Open Group's Trusted Technology Provider Accreditation Program. Conformance to the standard is assessed by Recognized third party Assessors. Once an organization has been successfully assessed as conforming to the standard then the organization is publicly listed in the Open Group's Accreditation Register. The third party assessment process is governed by the Accreditation Policy and Assessment Procedures.

== History ==
The effort to build the standard began in January 2010 with a meeting organized by The Open Group and including major industry representatives and the United States Department of Defense and NASA. The Open Trusted Technology Forum was formally launched in December 2010 to develop industry standards and enhance the security of global supply chains and the integrity of COTS ICT products.

The first publication of the Forum was a whitepaper describing the overall Trusted Technology Framework in 2010. The whitepaper was broadly focused on overall best practices that good commercial organizations follow while building and delivering their COTS ICT products. That broad focus was narrowed during late 2010 and early 2011 to address the most prominent threats of counterfeit and maliciously tainted products resulting in the O-TTPS which focuses specifically on those threats.

The first version of O-TTPS was published in April 2013. Version 1.1 of the O-TTPS standard was published in July 2014. This version was approved by ISO/IEC in 2015 as ISO/IEC 20243:2015.

The O-TTPS Accreditation Program began in February 2014. IBM was the first company to achieve accreditation for conformance to the standard.

The standard and accreditation program have been mentioned in testimony delivered to the US Congress regarding supply chain risk and cybersecurity. The National Defense Authorization Act for Fiscal Year 2016 Section 888 (Standards For Procurement Of Secure Information Technology And Cyber Security Systems) requires that the United States Secretary of Defense conduct an assessment of O-TTPS or similar public, open technology standards and report to the Committees on Armed Services of the US Senate and the US House of Representatives within a year.

== See also ==
- Supply chain security
- Counterfeit electronic components
- International Organization for Standardization
- Commercial off-the-shelf
- Information and communications technology
