= Lee Kee Group =

Hong Kong metal supplier

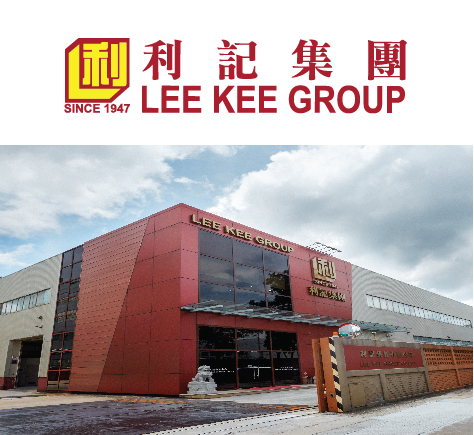
- Headquarters of Lee Kee Group
- Traded as: Stock code： 0637
- Founded: 15 June 1947
- Headquarters: 16 Dai Fat Street, Tai Po Industrial Estate, New Territories, Hong Kong
- Area served: Provides non-ferrous metals, customized alloy, assurance and testing services, technical consultancy
- Key people: Mr. Chan Chak Hong (founder); Mr. Chan Shu Cheong; Mr. Chan Pak Chung (chair); Ms. Chan Yuen Shan, Clara (vice-chair & CEO)
- Products: Base metals zinc, aluminium, nickel, copper as well as zinc alloy, aluminium alloy, stainless steel, electroplating chemicals and a variety of non-ferrous metals likes lead-free solder wire
- Subsidiaries: Lee Kee Metal Company Ltd. (HK); Lee Fung Metal Company Ltd. (HK); Lee Sing Materials Company Ltd. (HK); Lee Yip Metal Products Company Ltd. (HK); Essence Metal (Asia) Company Ltd. (HK); Promet Metals Testing Laboratory Ltd. (HK); Promet Consultancy Company Ltd. (HK); LKG Elite (Shenzhen) Company Ltd. (PRC); LKG Elite (Wuxi) Company Ltd. (PRC); LKG Elite (Guangzhou) Company Ltd. (PRC); Genesis Alloy (Ningbo) Ltd. (PRC); Mega International Resources Company Ltd. Taiwan Branch (Taiwan); LKG Singapore (Private) Ltd. (Singapore); LKG (Malaysia) SDN. BHD.
- Website: http://www.leekeegroup.com

Lee Kee Group Limited (HKEx: 0637), commonly referred to as Lee Kee, is a prominent supplier of non-ferrous metals based in Hong Kong that operates across Asia, established in 1947 by Chan Chak Hong. On 4 October 2006, Lee Kee was listed on the Main Board of the Hong Kong Stock Exchange. A major zinc alloy importer to China, Lee Kee was the first company in Greater China to be admitted as a Category 5 Associate Trade Member of the London Metal Exchange (LME).

Lee Kee offers metals including base metals zinc, aluminium, nickel, and copper as well as zinc alloy, aluminium alloy, stainless steel, electroplating chemicals and a variety of non-ferrous metals like lead-free solder wire. Apart from producing and distributing metals, Lee Kee's businesses include assurance and testing, and technical consultancy.

== History ==
=== 1940s–1950s ===
In 1942, Mr. Chan Chak Hong, grandfather of Mr. PC Chan, founded Lee Kee as a metal scrap trading company on Reclamation Street, Mong Kok. Lee Kee was formally registered in 1947. In late 1950s, Hong Kong's light industries bloomed, and so did the demand for molds. Lee Kee set up its alloying workshop to produce Lee Kee's own brand of zinc alloy.

=== 1960s–1970s ===
Lee Kee initiated and began trading with an Australian alloy producer, thus becoming one of first zinc alloy importers in the region.

=== 1980s ===
Lee Kee expanded the range of products, including zinc ingot, zinc alloy, aluminium ingot, aluminium alloy, magnesium, lead, copper, nickel, electroplating chemical and precious metals.

=== 1990s ===
Lee Kee established logistics centers to provide 'Just in Time' services to customers. A technical team was also set up to provide professional consulting services on mold design, failure analysis, efficiency optimization, and cost control.

=== 2000s ===
In 2001, Lee Kee established Genesis Alloys (Ningbo) Ltd., the first zinc alloy manufacturing plant in China that utilizes overseas alloying skills and technologies, providing support to Lee Kee's development in Eastern China.

In 2006, Lee Kee was successfully listed on the Main Board of the Hong Kong Stock Exchange (stock code: 0637).

In 2007, Lee Kee introduced stainless steel in its product range and offered cutting, slitting and shearing services.

In 2008, Lee Kee relocated its headquarters to Tai Po Industrial Estate, where daily operations, R&D center and supply chain services were centralized.

In 2009, Promet Metals Testing Laboratory, the first laboratory in Hong Kong accredited in Metals and Metallic Alloys category by The Hong Kong Laboratory Accreditation Scheme (HOKLAS) was established.

=== 2010–present ===
In 2014, Lee Kee became the first company in Greater China to be admitted as a Category 5 Associate Trade Member of London Metal Exchange (LME). In addition, Lee Kee was accredited as Tier 2 of Authorized economic operator (AEO) by the Hong Kong Customs and Excise Department. Genesis Alloys (Ningbo) Ltd. became wholly owned by Lee Kee, upholding the international standards of production and operation management for producing zinc alloys as always

In 2015, Lee Kee expanded its market reach to Taiwan, setting up Mega International Resources Company Limited (MIRC). Responding to the sudden surge of market demand of lead-free solder wire for copper pipes soldering in Hong Kong's construction industry, Lee Kee upgraded the production equipment and produced lead-free solder wire which was approved by Hong Kong Water Supplies Department and obtained Q-Mark certificate.

In 2017, Lee Kee established LKG Singapore (Private) Limited to provide alloys and services to customers in Southeast Asia.

In 2019, Lee Kee established LKG (Malaysia) SDN. BHD. to provide alloys in Southeast Asia.

== Alloy production ==
Fully owned by the Group, Genesis Alloys (Ningbo) Ltd. is the zinc alloy production plant in Ningbo, China and its brand name product "Genesis / GZ" is one of the zinc alloys in the local market.

Lee Kee has experience in developing specialized zinc and aluminium alloys together with manufacturers and brand owners in order to meet new product design or application requirements .

== Metals testing and analysis ==
Promet Metals Testing Laboratory (Promet) is qualified to conduct CS2 tests for the construction industry and a Samsler and Assayer (LSA) for pure zinc, aluminium and aluminium alloys.

== Overseas business ==
Lee Kee's overseas business network extends from Greater China to countries in The Belt and Road Initiative, with established sales centers in Shenzhen, Guangzhou, Wuxi, Taiwan, Singapore and Malaysia.
