= Transcend Information =

Taiwanese company

Transcend Information, Inc.

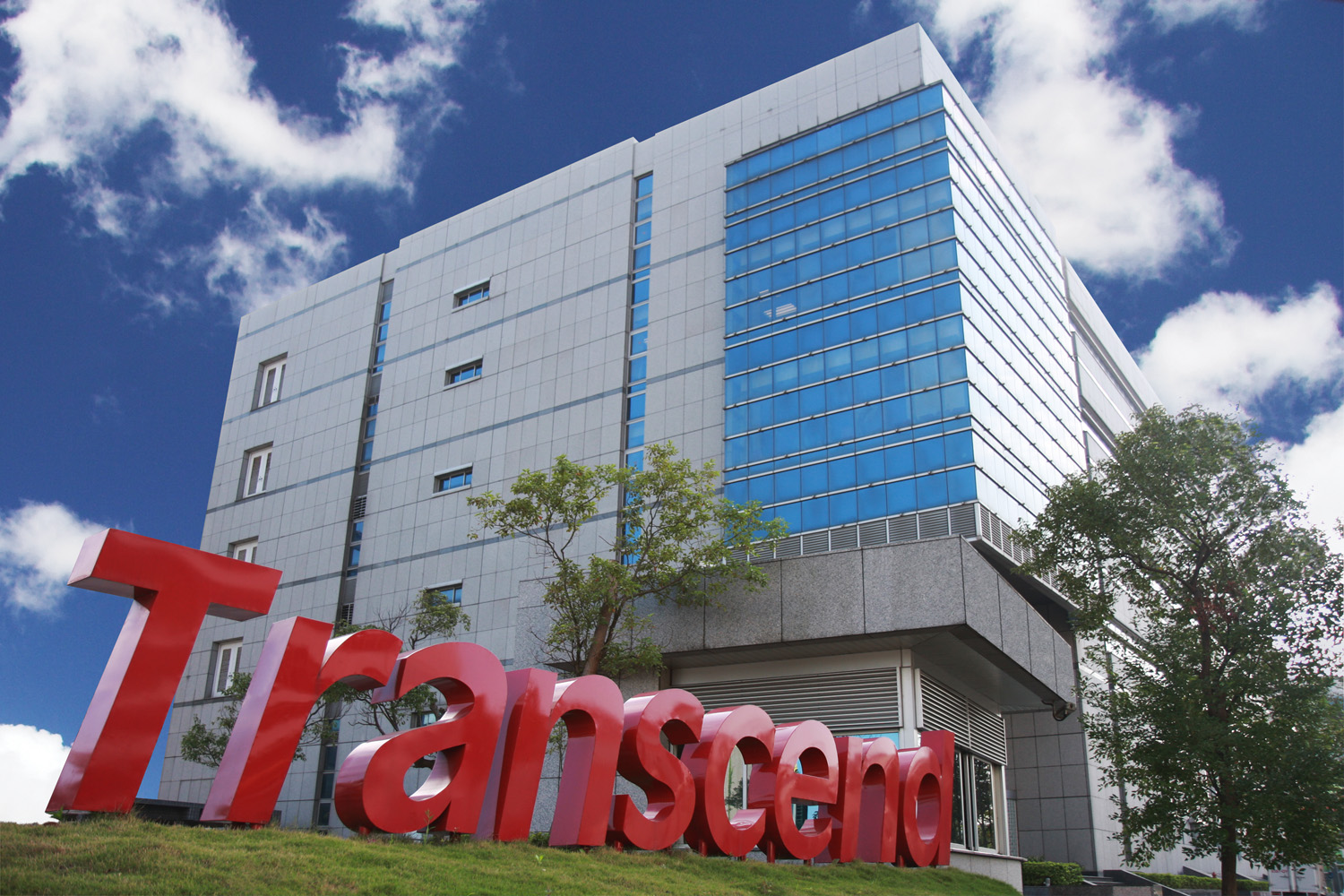
- Transcend headquarters in Taipei, Taiwan
- Native name: 創見資訊股份有限公司
- Type: Public
- Traded as: TWSE: 2451
- Industry: Storage devices, Semiconductors
- Founded: 1989; 37 years ago
- Founder: Chung-Won Shu
- Headquarters: Taipei, Taiwan
- Area served: Worldwide
- Key people: Chung-Won Shu (Chairman)
- Products: Embedded Solutions; Enterprise SSDs; Embedded SSDs; Embedded DRAM Modules; Embedded Memory Cards; Embedded Flash Solutions; Embedded Camera Modules Consumer Products; Internal SSDs; Portable SSDs; External Hard Drives; Dashcams; Body Cameras; Memory Cards; USB Flash Drives; DRAM Modules; Card Readers, DVD Writer & Accessories
- Number of employees: 1,100
- Website: www.transcend-info.com

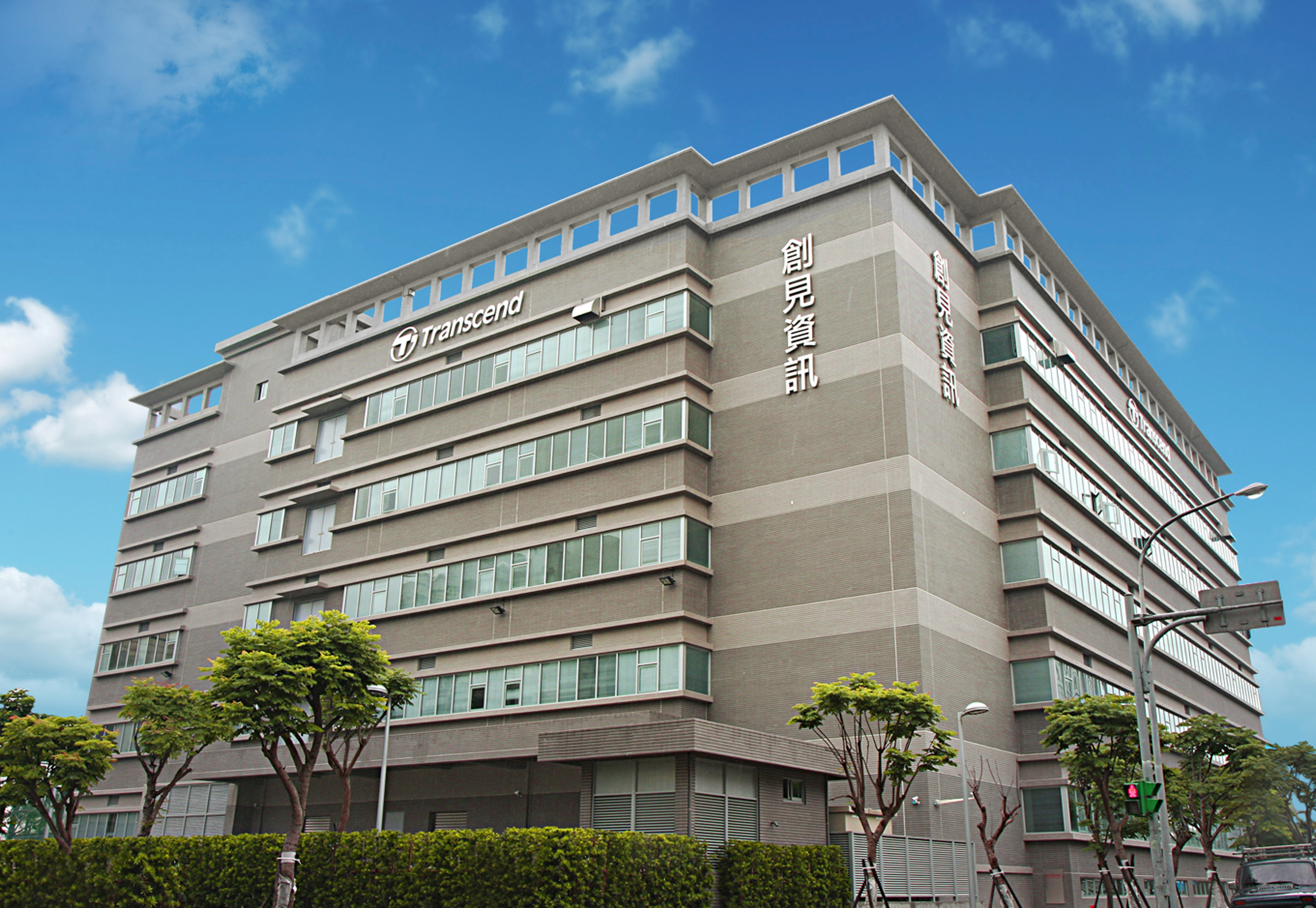
Taiwan factory

Transcend Information, Inc. (Chinese: 創見資訊股份有限公司; pinyin: Chuàngjiàn Zīxùn Gǔfèn Yǒuxiàn Gōngsī) is a Taiwanese manufacturer of memory and storage products headquartered in Taipei, Taiwan. The company was founded in 1989 by Chung-Won Shu (Peter Shu) and develops, manufactures, and markets memory modules, flash memory, and storage devices for consumer, embedded, and enterprise applications.

The company's product portfolio includes memory modules, solid-state drives (SSDs), memory cards, USB flash drives, portable storage devices, and embedded storage solutions. Its products are used in a variety of sectors, including consumer electronics, industrial automation, embedded systems, medical equipment, transportation, and other professional applications.

Transcend manages product research and development, design, manufacturing, and global sales. The company operates offices in Asia, North America, and Europe, providing sales, technical support, and customer service in multiple regional markets.

Transcend obtained ISO9001 certification for its Quality Management System in 1997 and has subsequently implemented additional management systems, including ISO14001 (Environmental Management System) and QC080000 (Hazardous Substance Process Management System). In 2024, the company was certified as an Authorized Economic Operator (AEO) by Taiwan Customs.

Since 2007, Transcend has been included in the Best Taiwan Global Brands rankings. Its products have also received the Taiwan Excellence Award and other international design awards.

== History ==
Founded in 1989, Transcend Information initially focused on the development of Chinese-language drivers for laser printers, printer controllers, and memory products. The company later expanded into the computer memory module market and began developing and manufacturing memory products.

During the 1990s, Transcend established overseas offices in the United States, Germany, the Netherlands, and Japan. In 1997, the company obtained ISO9001 certification for its Quality Management System.

Transcend was listed on the Taiwan Stock Exchange (TWSE: 2451) in 2001. In 2002, the company introduced the JetFlash series of USB flash drives, followed by the StoreJet series of external storage devices.

In 2003, Transcend relocated its headquarters to the Neihu Technology Park in Taipei.

In 2008, Transcend introduced a new corporate brand identity and expanded its product lineup to include solid-state drives (SSDs), dashcams, wearable cameras, Mac upgrade solutions, and personal cloud storage devices.

Since 2018, Transcend has introduced products based on technologies including 3D NAND flash, PCIe, and DDR5. The company has also expanded its industrial, enterprise, and embedded storage product lines for applications such as industrial automation, smart manufacturing, medical equipment, transportation, edge computing, and artificial intelligence.

== Product and services ==
Transcend develops and manufactures enterprise and embedded storage solutions and consumer storage products. Its products are used in applications including industrial automation, embedded systems, medical equipment, transportation, enterprise computing, and personal data storage.

=== Embedded solutions ===
Transcend's embedded product portfolio includes:

- Enterprise SSDs
- Embedded SSDs
- Embedded DRAM Modules
- Embedded Memory Cards
- Embedded Flash Solutions
- Embedded Camera Modules

These products are designed for applications including industrial automation, smart manufacturing, medical equipment, transportation, surveillance systems, edge computing, and artificial intelligence.

=== Consumer products ===
Transcend's consumer product portfolio includes:

- Internal SSDs
- Portable SSDs
- External Hard Drives
- Dashcams
- Body Cameras
- Memory Cards
- USB Flash Drives
- DRAM Modules
- Card Readers, DVD Writers & Accessories

These products are designed for a variety of applications, including desktop and laptop computers, mobile devices, digital content creation, and personal data storage.

== Awards and recognition ==
=== Brand recognition ===
Since 2007, Transcend has been included in Interbrand's Best Taiwan Global Brands ranking and has been listed among Taiwan's top 25 international brands.

=== Product awards ===
Transcend products have received Taiwan Excellence Awards across multiple product categories, including solid-state drives, memory modules, embedded storage products, and imaging devices. The company's products have also received international design awards, including the Good Design Award (Japan), the iF Design Award (Germany), and the Red Dot Design Award (Germany).

=== Sustainability ===
Transcend has been included in the FTSE4Good TIP Taiwan ESG Index, which evaluates companies based on environmental, social, and governance (ESG) criteria.

=== Quality and supply chain management ===
Transcend has obtained certifications including ISO9001 (Quality Management System), ISO14001 (Environmental Management System), and QC 080000 (Hazardous Substance Process Management System). In 2024, the company was certified as an Authorized Economic Operator (AEO) by Taiwan Customs.

== Corporate social responsibility ==
Transcend's corporate social responsibility activities include sports sponsorship, youth education, and support for arts and cultural programs.

=== Sports development and youth education ===
Since 2012, Transcend has sponsored the Chinese Taipei School Sport Federation (CTSSF). The sponsorship covers several nationwide high school sports competitions organized by the federation, including the High School Basketball League (HBL), High School Volleyball League (HVL), and High School Football League (HFL). The company has also received the Sports Promoter Award from Taiwan's Sports Administration, Ministry of Education, for more than ten consecutive years.

Since 2015, Transcend has sponsored the World Baseball Softball Confederation (WBSC) U-12 Baseball World Cup in 2015, 2017, and 2025.

Also in 2015, the company launched the Rural Baseball Seed Program to support youth baseball in rural areas of Taiwan. According to the company, the program has expanded to 13 cities, 30 schools, and more than 800 students.

=== Arts and cultural activities ===
From 2023 to 2026, Transcend sponsored concerts by the OneSong Orchestra as part of its arts and cultural initiatives.

== See also ==
- List of companies of Taiwan
