= Denise Krepp =

Denise R. Krepp
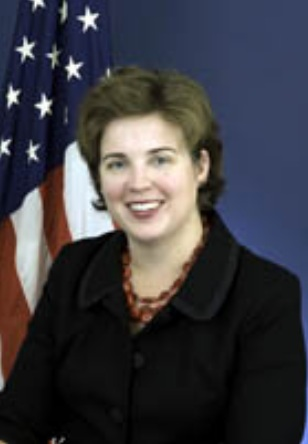
- Born: Atlanta, Georgia, U.S.
- Education: Elliott School of International Affairs (BA); University of Miami School of Law (JD)
- Occupations: (former) Chief Counsel, U.S. Maritime Administration(MARAD)

Kathryn Denise Rucker Krepp is an American lawyer, who formerly served as the Chief Counsel for U.S. Maritime Administration (MARAD) which operated under the United States Department of Transportation.

Before her political appointment by President Obama, Krepp served in the United States Coast Guard for two years and worked as a United States Congressional staffer for seven years. Krepp left government service in February 2012.

Krepp was a critic of Obama administration maritime and USAID policies after leaving government service.

== Education ==
Bachelor of Arts, International Affairs, Elliott School of International Affairs of The George Washington University, 1995

Juris Doctor, University of Miami School of Law, 1998

== Biography ==
Krepp is a lawyer specialized in a homeland security, transportation and energy. She is a former Chief Council for U.S. Maritime Administration (MARAD) which operated under the Department of Transportation, who has also served as a senior counsel to the House of Representatives' Committee on Homeland Security. Ms. Krepp began her career as an active duty U.S. Coast Guard officer in 1998.

In 2001, Krepp was a member of the team that created the U.S. Department of Homeland Security and Transportation Security Administration.

In 2005, Krepp joined the House of Representatives' Committee on Homeland Security as senior counsel under the chairmanship of Bennie G. Thompson of Mississippi. There, she drafted the maritime and surface transportation sections of the Implementing Recommendations of the 9/11 Commission Act of 2007, part of which involved the enshrinement into legislation the Container Security Initiative, Global Trade Exchange ports data gathering initiatives.

In 2009, Krepp was appointed by the President to serve as chief counsel at the U.S. Maritime Administration and special counsel to the general counsel at the U.S. Department of Transportation.

In February 2012, Krepp abruptly left her role as chief counsel.

Post-2012, Krepp works as a private consultant. She was a professor at the George Washington University and Pennsylvania State University.

In 2015, in an editorial in a local D.C. blog, Krepp claimed her "great-great-great father" was Howell Cobb, President of the Provisional Confederate Congress.

== Criticism of Obama administration ==
Since her departure from government service, Krepp has increasingly criticized the Obama administration's management of the maritime sector, making negative remarks about USAID's transition to international direct food aid from distribution of through the merchant marine. Krepp has also been critical of USAID management.

In a series of 2013 op-eds, Krepp has claimed Obama administration policies decrease U.S. jobs by debilitating the U.S. merchant marine.

Krepp also criticized her former boss, MARAD administrator David Matsuda, as unqualified to have managed the U.S. Maritime Administration, calling him an "inexperienced outsider" and "a former Senate staffer who did not have a maritime background".

Krepp also attacked 2013 Congressional agriculture-related legislation (i.e. the "Farm Bill"),

In 2014 Krepp was critical of the handling of sexual assaults by both the military as well as at the U.S. Merchant Marine Academy. She also served as a member of Response Systems to Adult Sexual Assault Crimes Panel, calling the lack of Open hearings the panels recommendations and testimony a "whitewash".

== See also ==
- Supply Chain Security
- U.S. Coast Guard
- Container Security Initiative
- Global Trade Exchange
- The International Convention for the Safety of Life at Sea (SOLAS Convention)
- Transportation Security Administration
- U.S. Coast Guard Judge Advocate General
- United States House Committee on Homeland Security
