= Customs =

Government agency which regulates the flow of goods and collects duties

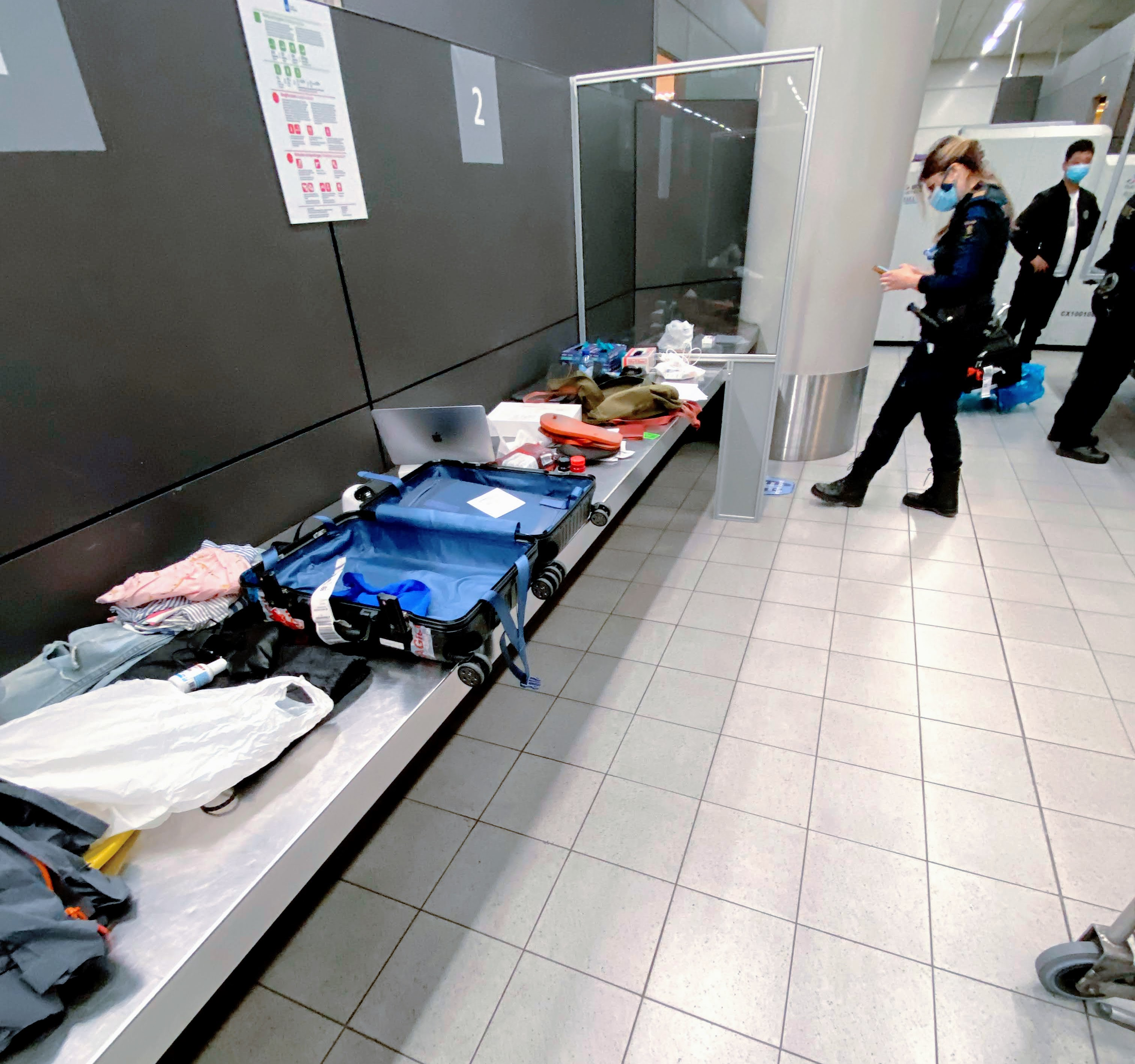
A customs officer in Amsterdam Airport Schiphol checks the luggage of an incoming traveler.

Vienna Convention road sign for customs

Customs is an authority or agency in a country responsible for collecting tariffs and for controlling the flow of goods, including animals, transports, personal effects, and hazardous items, into and out of a country. Traditionally, customs has been considered as the fiscal subject that charges customs duties (i.e. tariffs) and other taxes on import and export. In recent decades, the views on the functions of customs have considerably expanded and now covers three basic issues: taxation, security, and trade facilitation.

Each country has its own laws and regulations for the import and export of goods into and out of a country, enforced by their respective customs authorities; the import/export of some goods may be restricted or forbidden entirely. A wide range of penalties are faced by those who break these laws.

== Overview ==
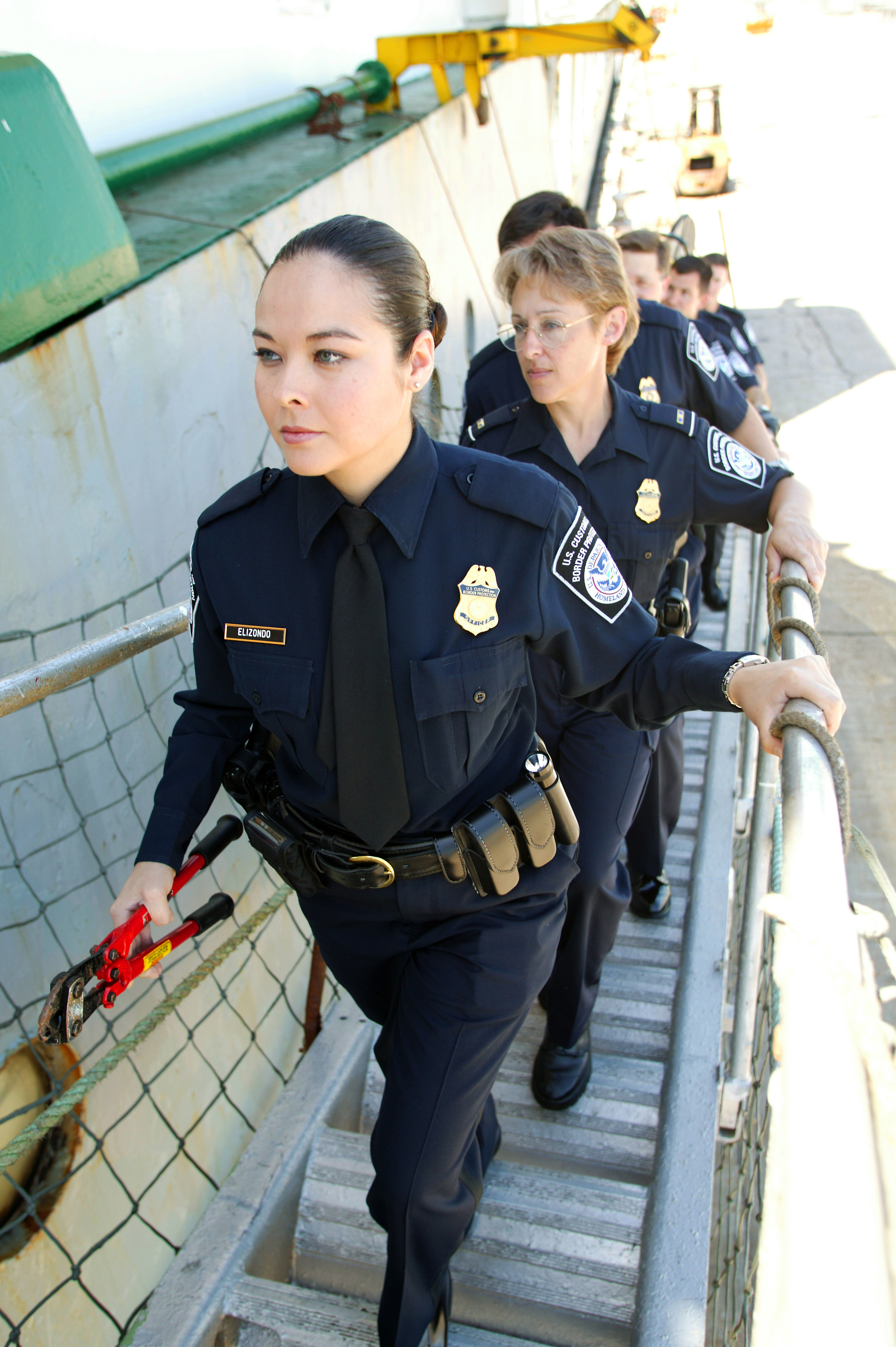
Officers from US Customs and Border Protection boarding a ship

=== Taxation ===
Customs taxes are considered an important form of indirect taxation in both developed and developing countries because they are primarily imposed on producers and passed on to consumers, who ultimately bear the tax burden. They are levied on imports, exports, or goods in transit, depending on their nature. Customs taxes play an important role in regulating foreign trade, promoting domestic products, and restricting the importation of certain goods. They can also be used to monitor goods entering the domestic market and restrict the entry of substandard products. In addition, they do not directly affect investment but can serve as an instrument for encouraging domestic industry. When properly applied, they are difficult to evade.

Customs taxes are defined as a type of indirect tax collected by the state on products when they cross national borders by sea, air, or land, whether entering or leaving the country. Consequently, customs duties can be defined as financial charges imposed by countries on imported or exported goods when they cross national borders.

=== Trade facilitation ===
International trade facilitation involves simplifying customs procedures, improving import and export documentation, and ensuring compliance with destination-country regulations. Customs clearance costs, which include clearance fees and trade facilitation measures, are a component of cross-border e-commerce transaction costs. Countries and regions such as Singapore, the United States, and the European Union have relatively low customs clearance costs associated with cross-border e-commerce. This can benefit domestic consumers and facilitate the entry of foreign products into their markets through cross-border e-commerce channels.

Electronic commerce platforms have also contributed to the facilitation of cross-border trade by connecting international buyers and sellers and supporting the processing of transactions, payments, and deliveries. Platforms enable businesses, including small enterprises, to access international markets. These platforms may also participate in delivery and fulfilment arrangements, helping to coordinate the movement of goods across borders. Some provide additional customs-related services. However, customs authorities remain responsible for regulating the entry of goods and collecting applicable duties and taxes.

In parts of Asia, Africa, and South America, customs clearance costs are generally higher, reflecting factors such as higher tariff and indirect tax rates and fewer mutual recognition agreements under the Authorized Economic Operator (AEO) programme.

=== Security ===
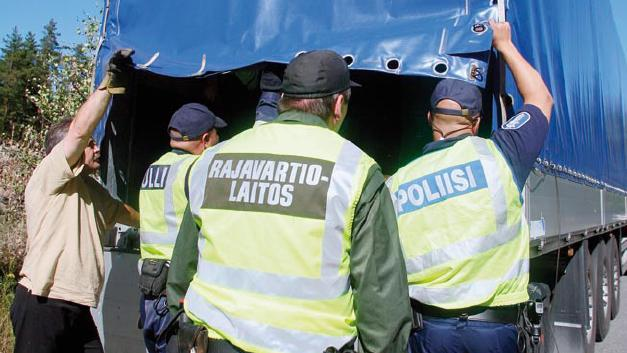
The Finnish police, customs and border guard working together in 2006

The September 11, 2001 terrorist attacks in the United States has become the cardinal factor in prompting a significant strengthening of the security component of modern customs operations, after which security-oriented control measures for supply chains have been widely implemented for the aims of identifying security risks.

At airports today, customs functions as the point of no return for all passengers; once passengers have cleared customs, they cannot go back. Anyone arriving at an airport must also clear customs before they can officially enter a country. Those who breach the law will be detained by customs and likely returned to their original location. The movement of people into and out of a country is normally monitored by migration authorities, under a variety of names and arrangements. Border control authorities normally check for appropriate documentation, verify that a person is entitled to enter the country, apprehend people wanted by domestic or international arrest warrants, and deny the entry of people deemed dangerous to the country.

The most complete guidelines for customs security functions implementation are provided in the World Customs Organization Framework of Standards to Secure and Facilitate Global Trade (SAFE), which has had five editions, in 2005, 2007, 2010, 2012, and 2018.

== Privatization of customs ==
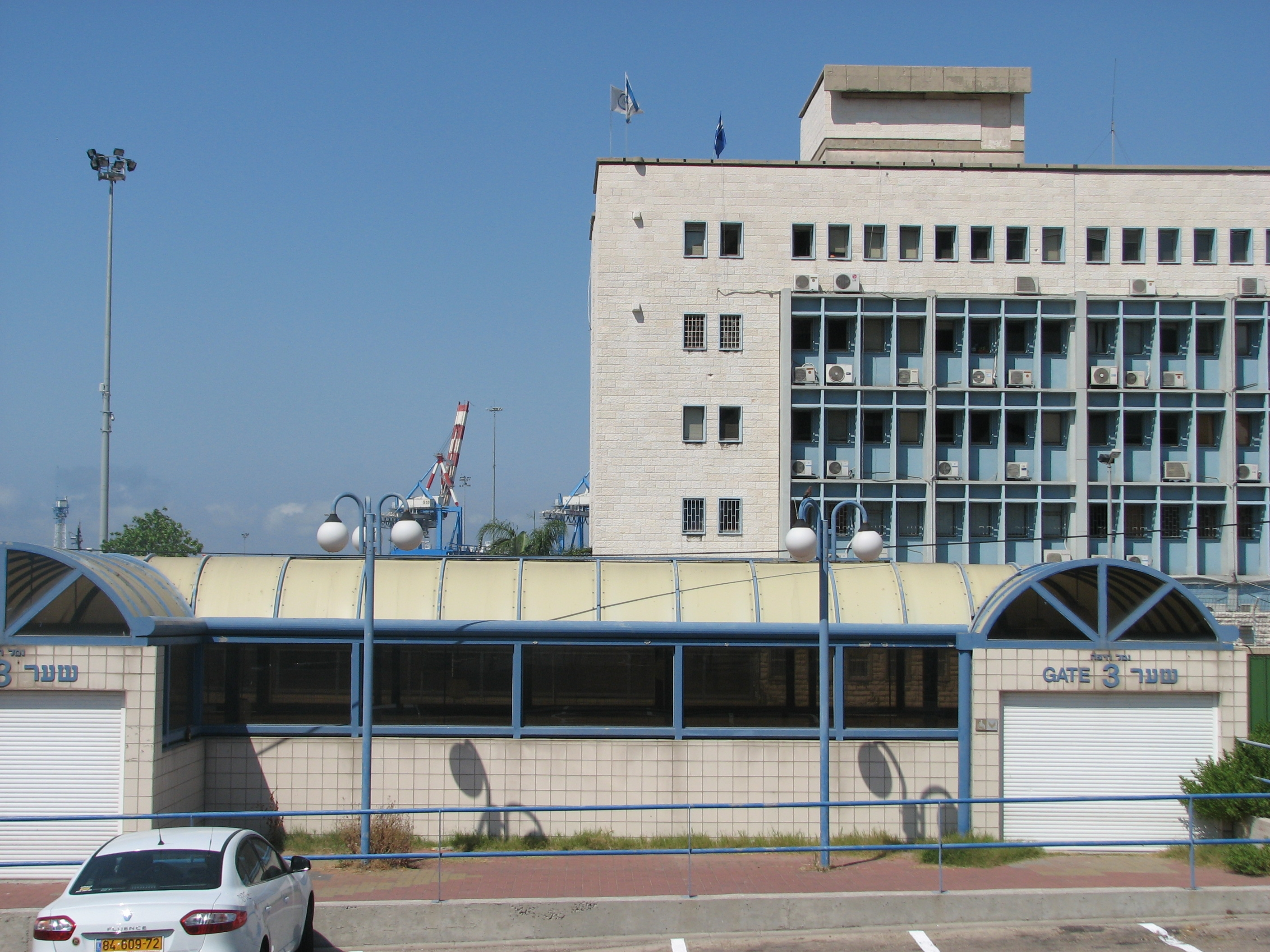
The customs-and-duty house at the port of Haifa, Israel

Customs is part of one of the three basic functions of a government, namely: administration; maintenance of law, order, and justice; and collection of revenue. However, in a bid to mitigate corruption, many countries have partly privatised their customs. This has occurred by way of contracting pre-shipment inspection agencies, which examine the cargo and verify the declared value before importation occurs. The country's customs is obliged to accept the agency's report for the purpose of assessing duties and taxes at the port of entry.

While engaging a pre-shipment inspection agency may appear justified in a country with an inexperienced or inadequate customs establishment, the measure has not been able to plug the loophole and protect revenue. It has been found that evasion of customs duty escalated when pre-shipment agencies took over. It has also been alleged that involvement of such agencies has caused shipping delays. Privatization of customs has been viewed as a fatal remedy. In many countries, import and export data are issued on the basis of national laws (Transparency Laws / Freedom of Information Act).

There have, however, been some speed bumps when transitioning customs over from the public to private sector. Factors such as an incompetent private sector, government's reluctance to change the traditional roles of customs, neglecting priority-setting and lack of transparency in the transition process have slowed the rate at which the public to private transition has taken place.

== Red and green channels ==
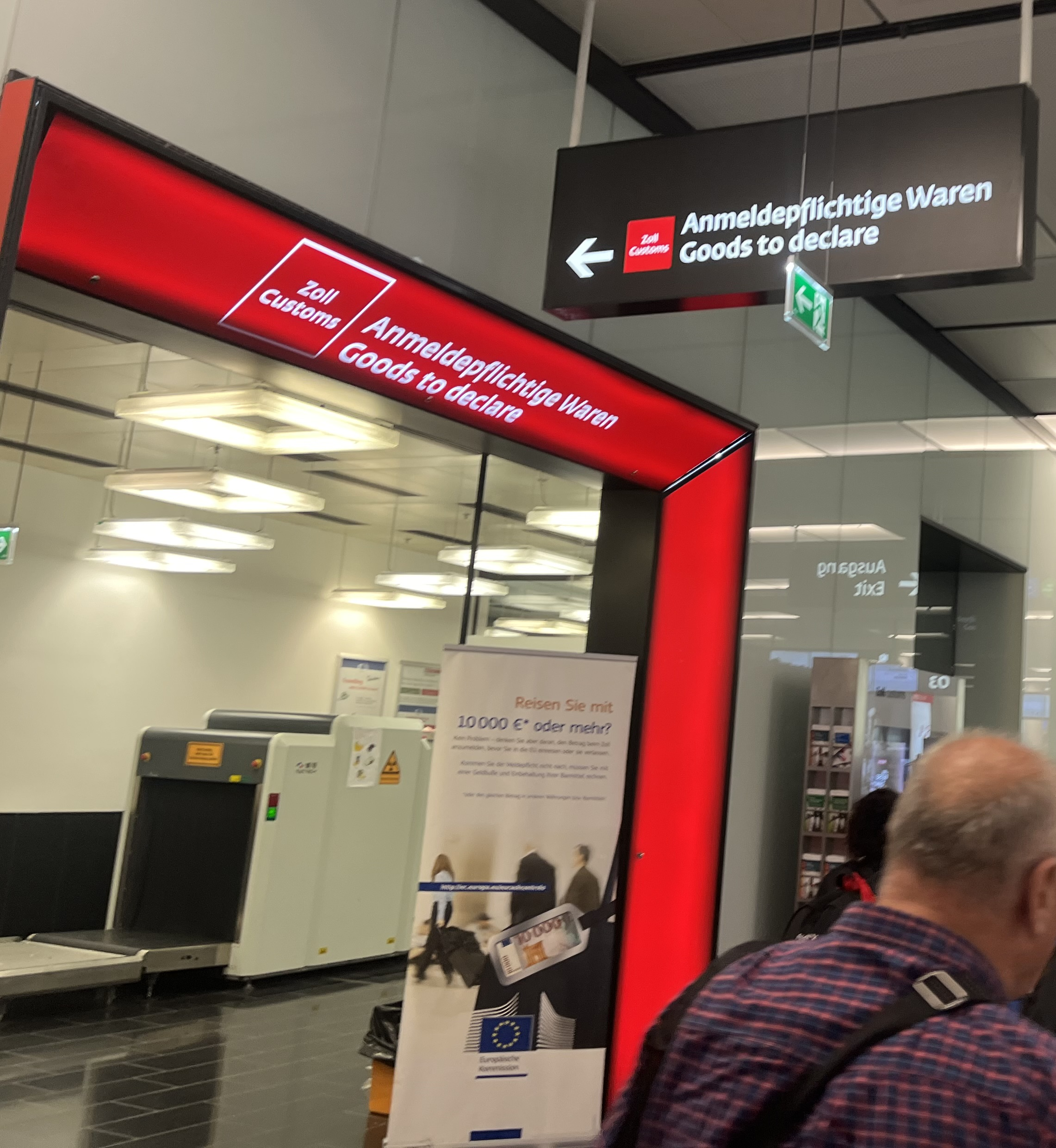
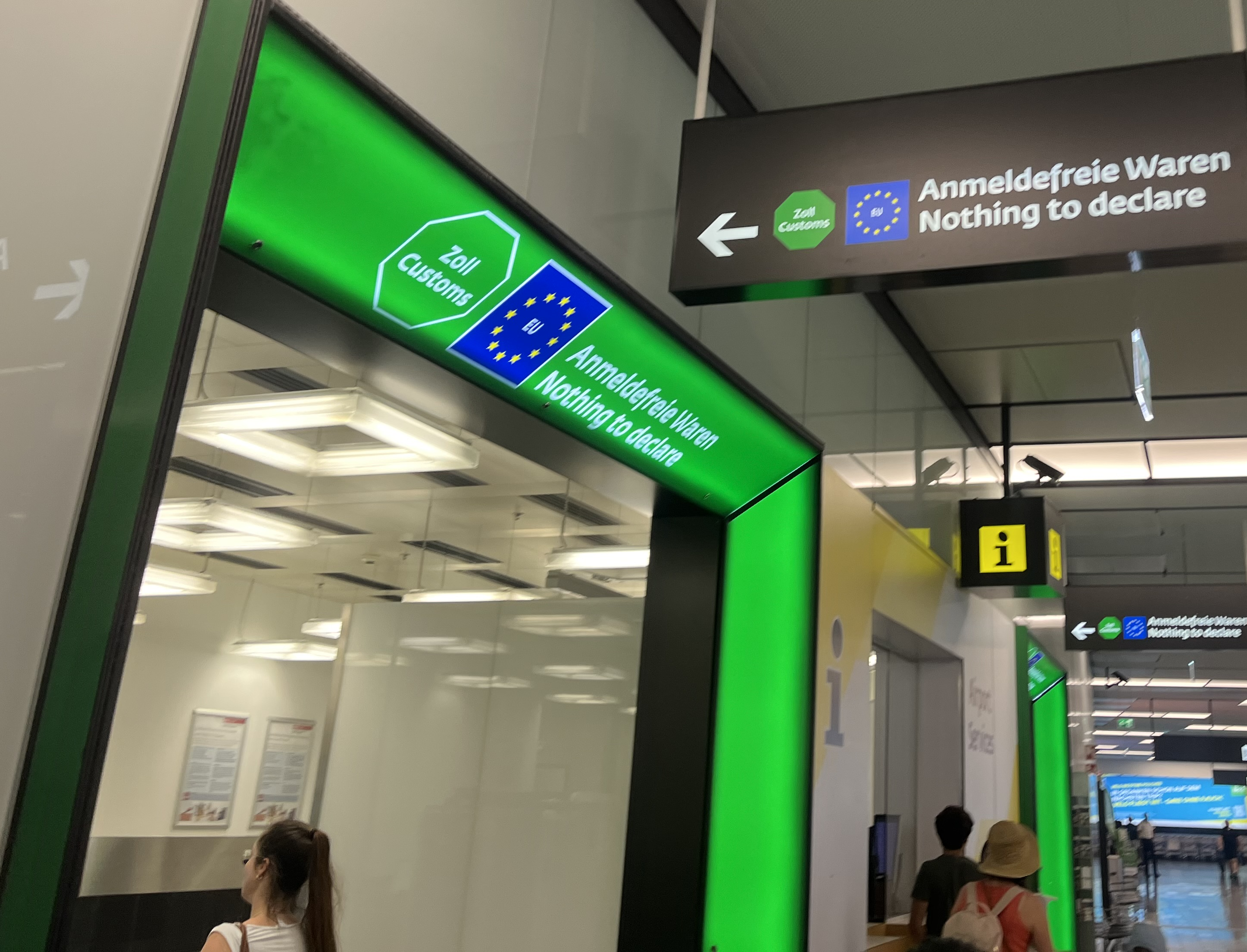
The red (left) and green (right) channels at Vienna International Airport, August 2025; the green channel also doubles as a blue channel for flights within the European Union (tantamount to domestic).

In most countries, customs procedures for arriving passengers at major international airports, ports and some road crossings are separated into red and green channels.

Passengers with goods to declare (carrying goods above the permitted customs limits and/or carrying prohibited items) go through the red channel, which houses the full-scale customs facilities, while passengers with nothing to declare (carrying goods within the permitted customs limits and not carrying prohibited items) go through the green channel, which only houses a one-way gate. However, entry into a particular channel constitutes a legal declaration, so if a passenger goes through a green channel and is found to be in possession of a prohibited item, or failure to declare dutiable items the passenger will be treated as a smuggler and can be subject to a fine, the item being seized, and in some cases result in an arrest and criminal prosecution. Each channel is a point of no return, once a passenger has entered a particular channel, they cannot go back to baggage claim; however, there is a connecting corridor between the two channels, to allow customs officials to redirect passengers to the appropriate channel (for example, passengers with an abnormally large amount of luggage may be redirected from the green channel to the red, where they will be inspected to ensure their luggage contains nothing above customs limits).

The use of this channel systems enables having a common baggage claim area for domestic and international flights; since domestic passengers, by definition, do not have goods which require a customs declaration, they exit the baggage claim via the green channel, while passengers connecting from an international flight to a domestic one will undergo customs inspection in their final destination, rather than the layover airport.

Australia, Canada, New Zealand, and the United States do not officially operate a red and green channel system, but some airports have adopted this layout. However, since this implementation is only unofficial, it lacks components of the "full" red/green channel system, such as a single baggage claim for domestic and international flights and customs inspections at the final destination.

=== Blue channel ===
Airports in EU countries also have a blue channel. As the EU is a customs union, travellers between EU countries do not have to pay customs duties. Value-added tax (VAT) and excise duties may be applicable if the goods are subsequently sold, but these are collected when the goods are sold, not at the border. Passengers arriving from other EU countries go through the blue channel, where they may still be subject to checks for prohibited or restricted goods. Luggage tickets for checked luggage travelling within the EU are green-edged so they may be identified.

In the recent years usage of the blue channel for customs purposes has become limited mostly to flights between the Schengen Area member states of the EU and the remainder of EU member states, while flights which cross the border of neither the customs union nor the Schengen Area are in practice treated as domestic, and therefore, the people travelling on them do not go through customs procedure at all, only passing through the physical facility housing the customs channel to exit the baggage claim. For this reason, the blue channel does not have its own facilities, but uses those of the green channel.

=== Red point phone ===
All airports in the United Kingdom operate a channel system; however, some airports do not have a red channel, instead having a red point phone which serves the same purpose.

== Summary of basic customs rules ==
=== Europe ===
The basic customs law is harmonized across Europe within the European Union Customs Union. This includes customs duties and restrictions. Customs tax typically applies from €22 to €150. For more information, see regulations of each member state. For customs declarations in the EU and in Switzerland, Norway and Iceland, the "Single Administrative Document" (SAD) is used as a basis.

==== Germany ====
Up to €22, there are no taxes. From €22 up to €150, it is necessary to pay VAT (EUSt in Germany), which is 7% or 19% depending on the goods. From €150 it is necessary to pay VAT and customs.

==== Romania ====
Customs may be very strict, especially for goods shipped from anywhere outside the EU. Up to €10 goods/package.

==== Italy ====
Customs in Italy takes additional 22% VAT (Value-added tax) for goods imported from outside the European Union even if the VAT is already paid to the origin country sender.

==== Czech Republic and Slovakia ====
Up to €22, there are no taxes. From €22 up to €150, it is necessary to pay VAT (DPH in Czech/Slovak), which is 21%. From €150, it is necessary to pay VAT and customs. Customs may range from zero to 10% depending on the type of imported goods.

==== Ukraine ====
Ukraine has had 5 reforms of its customs authorities. The recent one, in 2019, reorganized State Fiscal Service into the State Customs Service. The reform attempt seeks to digitize customs procedures, get market-level wages, innovate customs checkpoints, integrate into EU customs community, open reference database of customs inspections.

=== The Americas ===
==== Canada ====
In 2003, Canada replaced the Canada Customs and Revenue Agency with the current Canada Border Services Agency (CBSA). The CBSA performs searches at Canadian ports of entry and detains illegal immigrants, along with preventing contraband from entering the country. Tariffs are administered under Canada's Customs Tariff Act.

==== United States ====
Predicted US customs revenue
| Year | Predicted revenue (billion USD) |
|---|---|
| 2017 | 35 |
| 2018 | 38 |
| 2019 | 41 |
| 2020 | 43 |
| 2021 | 46 |
| 2022 | 47 |
| 2023 | 49 |
| 2024 | 51 |
| 2025 | 52 |
| 2026 | 54 |
| 2027 | 56 |
| 2028 | 58 |

Every person arriving at a US port of entry is subject to inspection by Customs and Border Protection (CBP) officers for compliance with immigration, customs and agriculture regulations. This public service is administered on almost a million visitors who enter the US daily. Travelers are screened for a number of prohibited items including; gold, alcoholic beverages, firearms and soil. A wide range of penalties face those non-compliers.

The United States imposes tariffs or "customs duties" on imports of goods, being 3% on average. The duty is levied at the time of import and is paid by the importer of record. Individuals arriving in the United States may be exempt from duty on a limited amount of purchases, and on goods temporarily imported (such as laptop computers) under the ATA Carnet system. Customs duties vary by country of origin and product, with duties ranging from zero to 81% of the value of the goods. Goods from many countries are exempt from duty under various trade agreements. Certain types of goods are exempt from duty regardless of source. Customs rules differ from other import restrictions. Failure to comply with customs rules can result in seizure of goods and civil and criminal penalties against involved parties. The CBP enforces customs rules. All goods entering the United States are subject to inspection by CBP prior to legal entry.

==== Uruguay ====
Uruguayan Customs place a cap on the importation of personal packages to up to 3 packages of a nominal value of no more than US$200 which can be entered into the country without extra charge. For a package to be included in the 3 free slots, the addressee must register the package with the Uruguayan Postal Service linking the tracking code, their address, national ID number phone and email address. Should a package arrive prior to registration the package must pay the 60% tax and no less than US$10. Any personal package worth more than US$200 or after the 3 free packages, must pay a 60% tax. This severely limits the public's ability to buy products online. Due to Uruguay's small population and market, many popular and specialty products are unavailable in the regular marketplace, forcing Uruguayans to strategically pool several purchases together and max each one of their free slots.

==== Argentina ====
Customs may be very strict. Goods valued up to US$500 brought in by plane and up to US$300 by sea or land are free of duties and taxes, cellphones and laptop computers are duty free regardless of their value only one per passenger, clothing and other personal use items are free of taxes. Above those values, tax is 50% of the value of all acquired goods summed up.

=== Asia ===
==== Indonesia ====
Direktorat Jenderal Bea dan Cukai (abbreviated Bea Cukai or DJBC), works under the Ministry of Finance (Indonesia) and performs various duties relating to the traffic of goods entering or leaving the Customs Area such as the collection of import/export duties, monitoring prohibition and restriction of certain goods, collecting excise and other state levies based on legislation apply. DJBC envisions itself as "The leading customs and excise institution globally" and has three missions:

- to facilitate trade and industry;
- to protect the border and the community from smuggling and illegal trade; and
- to optimize state revenue in the field of customs and excise

== International Customs Day ==
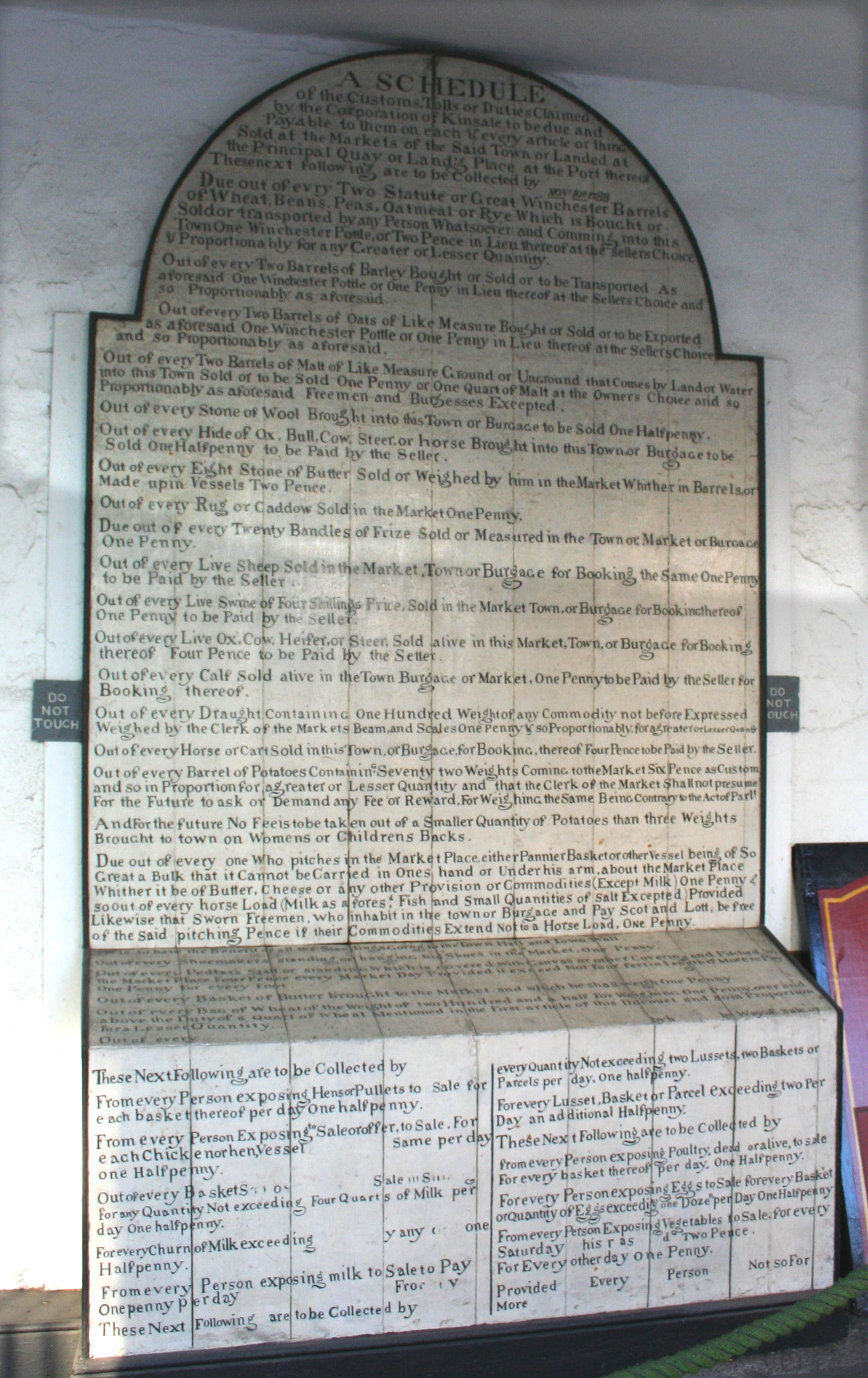
Customs, Tolls or Duties of the Corporation of Kinsale (1788)

International Customs Day recognizes the role of agencies and customs officials in maintaining border security around the world. It focuses on the workers and their working conditions as well as the challenges that some customs officers face in their job. Custom agencies hold employee appreciation events where custom officers are recognized for their work. Several agencies also hold events for the public where they explain their jobs and responsibilities in a transparent manner.

Each year, at the end of January is celebrated the International Customs Day with a particular theme, as follows:

- 2024, the chosen theme was 'Customs Engaging Traditional and New Partners with Purpose'.
- 2023, the chosen theme was 'Nurturing the Next Generation: Promoting a Culture of Knowledge-sharing and Professional Pride in Customs'.
- 2022, the chosen theme was 'Customs Digital Transformation by Embracing a Data Culture and Building a Data Ecosystem'.
- 2021, the chosen theme was 'Customs bolstering Recovery, Renewal and Resilience for a sustainable supply chain'.
- 2020, the chosen theme was 'Customs fostering Sustainability for People, Prosperity and the Planet'.
- 2019, the chosen theme was 'SMART borders for seamless Trade, Travel and Transport'.
- 2018, the chosen theme was 'A secure business environment for economic development'.
- Chosen theme for previous editions 2009 - 2018.

== See also ==
- Customs broker
- Customs officer
- Customs Trade Partnership against Terrorism
- Duty (economics)
- Port authority
- World Customs Journal
- World Customs Organization
