= Queen Mary School =

Queen Mary School may refer to:

- Queen Mary Elementary School, Vancouver, Canada
- Queen Mary School, Mumbai, India
- Queen Mary School, Lytham St Annes, Lancashire, England
- Queen Mary's School, Yorkshire, England
- Queen Mary's School for Boys, Basingstoke, England
