= European Customs Information Portal =

EU Import/Export information service

The European Customs Information Portal (ECIP) is an importing and exporting service provided by the EU for business operators of the member states of the European Union.

== European Customs Information Portal (ECIP) background ==
The European Customs Information Portal (ECIP) is a service for business operators, in particular SMEs, in all member states importing goods into and exporting goods from the European Union, such as carriers, forwarders, importers and exporters. It was launched by the European Commission and provides information on the rules to follow for EU imports, exports and transit. The first stage of ECIP focuses on the Safety and Security Amendment to the Community Customs Code which entered into force on 1 July 2009.

The customs portal constitutes a single point of access to relevant and practical information on transporting goods into and out of the EU and includes animated scenarios to explain each step of the import, export and transit procedures. It also outlines the legal framework for such procedures and covers information (such as policy information, databases and assistance services) taken from Commission and Member States’ customs websites. In addition, business operators can find useful links to online business databases like the online customs tariff TARIC and the VAT Information Exchange System (VIES), eLearning courses, as well as Member State helpdesk services.

ECIP was developed together with Member States and representatives from trade associations and will be further extended in the future to cover other areas and provide more in-depth information on customs procedures.
