= Authorized economic operator =

World customs organization standard

According to the World Customs Organization (WCO), an authorized economic operator (AEO) is

"a party involved in the international movement of goods in whatever function that has been approved by or on behalf of a national Customs administration as complying with WCO or equivalent supply chain security standards. Authorized Economic Operators include inter alia manufacturers, importers, exporters, brokers, carriers, consolidators, intermediaries, ports, airports, terminal operators, integrated operators, warehouses and distributors"

The growth of global trade and increasing security threats to the international movement of goods have forced customs administrations to shift their focus more and more to securing the international trade flow and away from the traditional task of collecting customs duties. Recognizing these developments, the WCO, drafted the WCO Framework of Standards to Secure and Facilitate global trade (SAFE). In the framework, several standards are included that can assist Customs administrations in meeting these new challenges. Developing an Authorized Economic Operator programme is a core part of SAFE.

== The WCO framework of standards to secure and facilitate global trade ==
The AEO concept is one of the main building blocks within the WCO SAFE Framework of Standards (SAFE). The latter is part of the future international Customs model set out to support secure trade. SAFE sets out a range of standards to guide international Customs Administrations towards a harmonized approach based on Customs to Customs cooperation and Customs to Business partnership.

SAFE is based on four core elements:

1. harmonization of the advance electronic cargo information
2. each country that joins SAFE commits to employing a consistent risk management approach to address security threats
3. at the request of the Customs administration of the receiving nation, the customs administration of the sending nation will perform an outbound inspection of high-risk containers and cargo.
4. definition of benefits that Customs will provide to businesses that meet minimal supply chain security standards and best practices.

The essence of the AEO-concept can be found in the Customs-to-Business partnerships. Operators can be accredited by Customs as AEOs when they prove to have high quality internal processes that will prevent goods in international transport from being tampered with. I.e.:

- Ensure the integrity of the information, i.e. what is said to be in a container, really is in the container and nothing else, more, or less;
- Ensure the integrity of its employees, that they will not put goods in container that should not be there; and
- Secure access to its premises, to prevent unauthorized persons from putting goods in the container.

As a result, customs will trust the operator and perform less or no inspections on goods imported or exported by or via the AEO. This benefits the mover of the goods as goods are available more quickly, which means lower transport costs. Customs benefits as scarce inspection capacity can be targeted better at the cargo of unknown and potentially unsafe operators.

== Different AEO programmes ==
Most members of WCO have acceded to the SAFE framework, and it is expected that in the next few years, the majority of customs administrations will introduce AEO-programmes. The 2020 edition of the Compendium identified 77 operational AEO programmes worldwide, a further 17 due to be launched, and 31 operational customs compliance programmes. According to the 2014 edition of the Compendium of Authorized Economic Operator Programmes, published by the World Customs Organization, the following countries had either fully operational or pilot AEO programmes at that time:

- Algeria (AEO Import/Export type);
- Andorra (AEO Import/Export type);
- Argentina, under the name of Customs System of Reliable Operators (SAOC) - export type launched in 2006, import/export type, since 2012 only for CUSE System which is a programme recently incorporated by the Federal Administration of Public Revenues of Argentina involving courier service providers;
- Australia, under the name of Australian Trusted Trader (ATT)
- Canada, under the name of Partners in Protection (PIP) - export/import type, launched in 1995 and Customs Self-Assessment (CSA) -Import type, since 2001;
- Chile (AEO Export type), since 2012;
- China, under the name of Classified Management of Enterprises - import/export type, since 2008;
- Colombia (AEO Import/Export type), since 2011;
- Costa Rica, under the name of Customs Facilitation Programme for Reliable Trade (PROFAC) - export type, since 2011;
- Dominican Republic (AEO Import/Export type), since 2012;
- European Union (AEO Import/Export type), since 2008;
- El Salvador (AEO Import/Export type), since 2014;
- Guatemala (AEO Import/Export type), since September 2011;
- Hong Kong, China, under the name of Hong Kong AEO Programme - import/export type, since 2012;
- India (AEO Import/Export type), since 2012;
- Israel (AEO Import/Export type), since 2011;
- Japan (AEO Import/Export type), since 2007;
- Jordan, under the name of Golden List Programme- import/export type, since August 2005;
- Kenya (AEO Import/Export type), since November 2010;
- Korea (AEO Import/Export type), since 2009;
- Malaysia (AEO Import/Export type), since 2010;
- Mexico, under the name of Authorized Economic Operator - import/export type, since January 2012;
- Morocco (AEO Import/Export type), since 2006 (two programmes: AEO Customs Simplification and AEO Security and Safety);
- New Zealand, under the name of Secure Export Scheme (SES) - export type, since 2004;
- Norway (AEO Import/Export type), since 2009;
- Peru, under the name of Certified Customs User (UAC - OEA) - export type, since October 2012;
- Singapore, under the name of Secure Trade Partnership (STP)- import/export type, since 2007;
- Switzerland (AEO Import/Export type), since 2011;
- Taiwan (AEO Import/Export type);
- The United States, under the name of C-TPAT (Customs-Trade Partnership against Terrorism), since November 2001;
- Thailand (AEO Import/Export type), import since 2011 and export since 2013;
- Tunisia (AEO Import/Export type), since 2010 as a pilot programme;
- Turkey (AEO Import/Export type), since 2013;
- Uganda (AEO Import/Export type), since March 2012;
- Uruguay (AEO Import/Export type), since 2014;
- Zambia, under the name of Customs Accredited Clients Programme (CACP) - import type.

At the end of 2014, Brazil has also launched its AEO Programme by the name of “Operador Econômico Autorizado” (OEA) which will be implemented in three phases: OEA-Segurança - export type with focus on security, launched in December 2014 (certification based on compliance with a range of safety requirements), OEA-Conformidade - import type expected to be launched by December 2015 (certification will be based on compliance with customs regulations and procedures through the expansion and revision of the Blue Line Programme) and OEA-Integrado in which other public entities such as the Brazilian Health Agency (ANVISA) and the International Agricultural Surveillance System (VIGIAGRO) will be integrated into the AEO programme with the goal of further streamlining and integrating international trade controls - expected to be launched by December 2016.

On 1 July 2016, Australia launched its AEO program – Australian Trusted Trader (ATT). ATT accredits eligible entities supply chain security and trade compliance standards. ATT is open to all importers, exporters and service providers, via both air and sea cargo.

Although all these programmes find their roots in the SAFE framework of standards, the approaches differ, e.g. the USA only allows importers to participate in C-TPAT, whereas the European AEO programme is open to all operators in the supply chain. The European AEO programme differs from the other programmes as that it has a wider scope, as it encompasses customs simplified procedures next to security and with that relates to compliance with all customs legislation, including customs duties.

== Mutual recognition ==
The importance of coordinated, similar, programmes lies in the fact that the ultimate goal is to get all national programmes mutually recognized, meaning that AEO accreditations have the same value everywhere. As a result, secure supply chains can be established, as all parts of the chain from origin (place of stuffing of the container) to destination (place of unpacking of the container) are deemed to be safe, albeit under different AEO programmes. This would greatly facilitate global trade. By July 2008 the United States , had signed mutual recognition agreements with New Zealand, Canada and Jordan. Several other countries and trade blocks are starting their negotiations about it, e.g. the US and the European Union

Recently, The EU and China have decided to facilitate trade between their economic operators by mutually recognising their respective programmes for Authorised Economic Operators (AEO).

== See also ==
- ATA Carnet
- Supply chain security
- European Customs Information Portal (ECIP)
