= Quintus Mucius Scaevola =

Quintus Mucius Scaevola may refer to one of the following politicians of the Roman Republic:

- Quintus Mucius Scaevola (praetor 215 BC), governor of Sardinia
- Quintus Mucius Scaevola (consul 174 BC), believed to be the son of the praetor in 215 BC
- Quintus Mucius Scaevola Augur (c. 159 – 88 BC), consul 117 BC
- Quintus Mucius Scaevola Pontifex (140–82 BC), consul 95 BC
