= Container Security Initiative =

Security program by the U.S. CBP

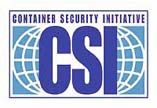

The Container Security Initiative (CSI) was launched in 2002 by U.S. Bureau of Customs and Border Protection (CBP), an agency of the Department of Homeland Security. Its purpose was to increase security for container cargo shipped to the United States. As the CBP puts it, the intent is to "extend [the] zone of security outward so that American borders are the last line of defense, not the first".

== Rationale ==
Containerized shipping is a critical component of international trade. According to the CBP:

- About 90% of the world's trade is transported in cargo containers.
- Almost half of incoming U.S. trade (by value) arrives by containers on board ships.
- Nearly seven million cargo containers arrive on ships and are offloaded at U.S. seaports each year.

As terrorist organizations have increasingly turned to destroying economic infrastructure to make an impact on nations, the vulnerability of international shipping has come under scrutiny. Under the CSI program, the screening of containers that pose a risk for terrorism is accomplished by teams of CBP officials deployed to work in concert with their host nation counterparts.

== CSI core elements ==
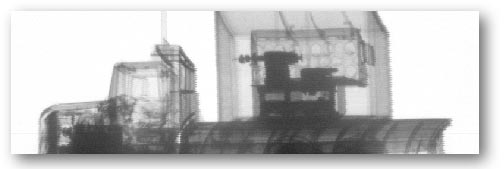
Gamma-ray image of a truck with cargo container

CSI consists of four core elements:

- Using intelligence and automated information to identify and target containers that pose a risk for terrorism.
- Pre-screening those containers that pose a risk at the port of departure before they arrive at U.S. ports.
- Using detection technology to quickly pre-screen containers that pose a risk.
- Using smarter, tamper-evident containers.

The initial CSI program has focused on implementation at the top 20 ports shipping approximately two-thirds of the container volume to the United States. Smaller ports, however, have been added to the program at their instigation, and participation is open to any port meeting certain volume, equipment, procedural, and information-sharing requirements. Future plans include expansion to additional ports based on volume, location, and strategic concerns.

Much of the original idea behind the CSI program stemmed from the work of James Giermanski, who was an early proponent of Supply Chain Security.

== Global impact ==
The CSI program offers its participant countries the reciprocal opportunity to enhance their own incoming shipment security. CSI partners can send their customs officers to major U.S. ports to target ocean-going, containerized cargo to be exported from the U.S. to their countries. Likewise, CBP shares information on a bilateral basis with its CSI partners. Japan and Canada are currently taking advantage of this reciprocity.

CSI has also inspired and informed global measures to improve shipping security. In June 2002, the World Customs Organization unanimously passed a resolution that will enable ports in all 161 of the member nations to begin to develop programs along the CSI model. On 22 April 2004, the European Union and the U.S. Department of Homeland Security signed an agreement that calls for the prompt expansion of CSI throughout the European Community.

== Participating ports ==
=== U.S. ports ===
- NOTE: Information is needed here on ports participating in reciprocal agreements.

=== Foreign ports ===
47 foreign CSI ports are operational as of 2006-09-29. They include:

- Halifax, Montreal, and Vancouver, Canada (March 2002)
- Rotterdam, The Netherlands (2002-09-02)
- Le Havre, France (2002-12-02)
- Marseille, France (2005-01-07)
- Bremerhaven, Germany (2003-02-02)
- Hamburg, Germany (2003-02-09)
- Antwerp, Belgium (2003-02-23)
- Zeebrugge, Belgium (2004-10-29)
- Singapore (2003-03-10)
- Yokohama, Japan (2003-03-24)
- Tokyo, Japan (2004-05-21)
- Hong Kong, China (2003-05-05)
- Gothenburg, Sweden (2003-05-23)
- Felixstowe, United Kingdom (UK) (2003-05-24)
- Liverpool, Thamesport, Tilbury, and Southampton, UK. (2004-11-01)
- Genoa, Italy (2003-06-16)
- La Spezia, Italy (2003-06-23)
- Livorno, Italy (2004-12-30)
- Naples, Italy (2004-09-30)
- Gioia Tauro, Italy (2004-10-31)
- Pusan, Korea (2003-08-04)
- Durban, South Africa (2003-12-01)
- Port Klang, Malaysia (2004-03-08)
- Tanjung Pelepas, Malaysia (2004-08-16)
- Piraeus, Greece (2004-07-27)
- Algeciras, Spain (2004-07-30)
- Nagoya and Kobe, Japan (2004-08-06)
- Laem Chabang, Thailand (2004-08-13)
- Dubai, United Arab Emirates (UAE) (2005-03-26)
- Shanghai, China (2005-04-28)
- Shenzhen, China (2005-06-24)
- Kaohsiung, Republic of China (Taiwan) (2005-07-25)
- Santos, Brazil (2005-09-22)
- Colombo, Sri Lanka (2005-09-29)
- Buenos Aires, Argentina (2005-11-17)
- Lisbon, Portugal (2005-12-14)
- Port Salalah, Oman (2006-03-08)
- Puerto Cortes, Honduras (2006-03-25)
- Caucedo, Dominican Republic (2006)
- Kingston, Jamaica (2006)
- Freeport, Bahamas (2006)

There are currently 58 foreign ports participating in the Container Security Initiative, accounting for 85 percent of container traffic bound for the United States, according to the U.S. Department of Homeland Security.

Currently Operational Ports

In the Americas

- Montreal, Vancouver, and Halifax, Canada (March 2002)
- Santos, Brazil
- Buenos Aires, Argentina
- Puerto Cortes*, Honduras
- Caucedo, Dominican Republic
- Kingston, Jamaica
- Freeport, The Bahamas
- Balboa, Colon, and Manzanillo, Panama
- Cartagena, Colombia

In Europe:

- Rotterdam, The Netherlands (2002-09-02)
- Bremerhaven and Hamburg, Germany
- Antwerp and Zeebrugge, Belgium
- Le Havre and Marseille, France
- Gothenburg, Sweden
- La Spezia, Genoa, Naples, Gioia Tauro, and Livorno, Italy
- Felixstowe, Liverpool, Thamesport, Tilbury, and Southampton, United Kingdom (U.K.)
- Piraeus, Greece
- Algeciras, Barcelona, and Valencia, Spain
- Lisbon, Portugal

In Asia and the Middle East

- Singapore*
- Yokohama, Tokyo, Nagoya, and Kōbe, Japan
- Hong Kong
- Busan* (Pusan), South Korea
- Port Klang and Tanjung Pelepas, Malaysia
- Laem Chabang, Thailand
- Dubai, United Arab Emirates (UAE)
- Shenzhen and Shanghai
- Kaohsiung and Chi-Lung
- Colombo, Sri Lanka
- Port Salalah*, Oman
- Port Qasim, Pakistan
- Ashdod, Israel
- Haifa, Israel

In Africa:

- Alexandria, Egypt
- Durban, South Africa

== See also ==
- Supply Chain Security
- List of seaports
- Port security
- SAFE Port Act 2006 (H.R. 4954)
- Ship transport
- Global Trade Exchange
- Denise Krepp
- James Giermanski
