= 10 + 2 =

The Importer Security Filing (ISF) also referred to as 10+2, is a customs import requirement of the United States Customs and Border Protection (CBP); which requires containerized cargo information, for security purposes, to be transmitted to the agency at least 24 hours (19 CFR section 149.2(b) before goods are loaded onto an ocean vessel headed to the U.S. (i.e. mother vessel, not feeder vessel) for shipment into the U.S. 10+2 is pursuant to section 203 of the SAFE Port Act, and requires importers to provide 10 data elements to CBP, as well as 2 more data documents (Container Status Messages and the vessel's Stow Plan)from the carrier.

ISF filing is exempted for bulk cargo and a few identified breakbulk cargo. The filing should be done for the rest of the commodities. including containerized cargo.

The new rule, published on November 26, 2008, went into effect on January 26, 2009. CBP is taking a phased-in approach in terms of implementation and enforcement. During the first 12 months, importers will be warned of infractions instead of being fined, with the hope that the importers will establish a filing system. All ISF filings are required to be submitted electronically via the Automated Broker Interface (ABI) or the Automated Manifest System (AMS). For shipments on the water on or after June 30, 2016, CBP had ended the phased-in approach and ISF compliance is in full effect. If compliance is not met, liquidated damages penalties up to $5,000 may be issued by the local port for each violation.

The ISF needs to be submitted at the lowest bill of lading level (i.e., house bill or regular bill) that is transmitted into the Automated Manifest System (AMS). The bill of lading number is the only common “link” between the ISF and the customs manifest data. The following 10 data elements are required from the importer:

1. Manufacturer (or supplier) name and address
2. Seller (or owner) name and address
3. Buyer (or owner) name and address
4. Ship-to name and address
5. Container stuffing location
6. Consolidator (stuffer) name and address
7. Importer of record number/foreign trade zone applicant identification number
8. Consignee number(s)
9. Country of origin
10. Commodity Harmonized Tariff Schedule number to six digits

From the carrier, 2 data elements are required:

1. Vessel stow plan
2. Container status messages

The above information is required for the Department of Homeland Security to "push out" U.S. borders.

== Automation ==
An automated 10+2 solution takes electronic data, sent from supply chain partners, and maps it to the requested data elements required by CBP. The filing of this information is known by CBP as the Importer Security Filing. With an automated solution, importers utilize the software to:

- Load data from electronic files or allow for manual entry of data
- Notify users automatically when work needs to be completed for filing purposes
- Connect to CBP, allowing the importer to file the ISF
- Validate classification data for all filings before transmitting to CBP
- Designate fields to automatically populate with consistent data across all filings for a company
- Track the events of a shipment and coinciding ISF data elements triggered by those events

The importer is ultimately responsible for filing the required data elements or trusting a third party, such as a broker or a Freight forwarder, to submit the appropriate product information, or using an automation system provided by companies which offer ERP system to help manage electronic filing requirements of customs of other countries, such as Integration Point, SAP, Amber Road, to submit the appropriate product information.
