= Qeep =

Social network released in 2006

qeep
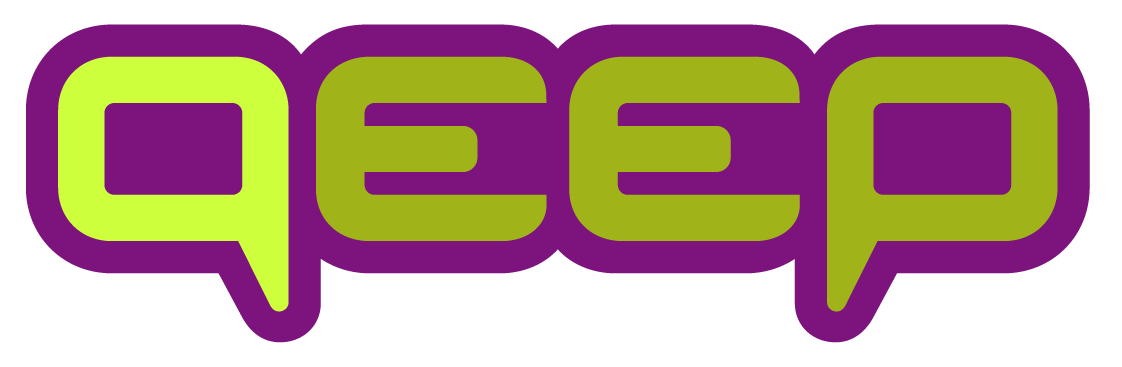
- Developer: K2 Interactive GmbH
- Stable release: Android: 4.2.15; iOS: 3.1.8
- Written in: Java,
- Operating system: iOS; Android
- Available in: English, German, Russian, Spanish, Portuguese, French, Turkish, Italian
- Type: Mobile social network
- License: Proprietary
- Website: https://www.qeep.net/

qeep is a social network for mobile phones. A license-free application, qeep was first released in beta in 2006. Initially meant for Java mobile owners only, in 2011 the mobile social network launched an Android version. As of fall 2015 there is also a client for the iPhone available.

qeep can be downloaded free via the website. In addition, qeep's Android version is available for free at the Google Play Store (formerly known as Android Market) and for iOS at the Apple App Store. Any internet-ready mobile phone that supports at least Java MIDP 2.0, Android 2.3 or iOS 8 is qeep compatible. The application can work on over 1,000 different model phones and is available in 7 different languages: English, German, Spanish, Portuguese, French, Russian and Turkish since July 2012.

== History ==
Blue Lion mobile GmbH, qeep's parent company, was founded in the summer of 2006 for the specific purpose of developing and marketing qeep. In June 2007, Blue Lion mobile received a seven-figure Series-A funding package from Bertelsmann Digital Media Investments to further develop and distribute the product. Funding was also earmarked for increasing the number of handsets on which the program functions and to launch in additional key European markets. Bertelsmann's support of qeep is an example of their efforts to compete with social networking giants, such as News Corp's MySpace.

In January 2014 qeep has hit the 25 million user mark. In February this number already increased to 26 million with an estimated 30,000 new users joining every day.

In May 2012 Qeep was awarded 3rd prize in the Emotional Closeness category of Nokia's Create for Millions 2012 developer contest.

== Features ==
Qeep essentially operates as a self-contained software bundle of interactive features.

=== QMS ===
The qeep messaging service is a short message service internal to the qeep network. Message content is compressed by a proxy server system and exchanged via GPRS or UMTS within the mobile application. This greatly reduces the expense of sending messages, essentially leaving the accompanying data transfer rate as the only remaining cost. However, with the exception of invitations sent to new members, QMS cannot be sent to mobile phones outside of qeep's network, nor can those messages be read outside of the qeep program.

=== Photoblogging ===
While qeep does not offer any sort of digital photography software, it does permit mobile phones with built-in camera to take and store pictures within the qeep database. These photos are organized in individual user's photoblogs, which are preserved in the qeep database rather than on the mobile itself. Rather than sharing their pictures through individual – and expensive – picture messages, users can display daily adventures in their photoblogs, which are linked to their qeep profiles. This simultaneously offers the user near-limitless storage space while also limiting photo access to within the qeep program. Thus the qeep photoblog system operates along a similar model to online photo sharing networks.

=== Games ===
As of December 2009, qeep's application package includes a range of turn-based live games. The games on qeep can all be played solo or in real time against another qeep user. "Battleships," the first game released on qeep, is based upon the classic game of similar name, while "Quadrix" is a Connect Four equivalent. A specialized version of Tic-tac-toe was introduced in October 2008. In March 2009, qeep released Crazy 8's, a strategic card game, as its fourth game. FlipChip, a Reversi equivalent, is qeep's fifth game and was released in December 2009.

In May 2012 three new games were added to the Android portfolio of qeep mobile games: Gangs of Crime City and Jewels Island. All three are developed by the Berlin-based mobile entertainment company Softgames, which became qeep's first third-party game partner, unlocking an audience of over 13 million registered users worldwide.

=== Sound attacks ===
Sound Attacks are mp3 audio files built into the qeep network. Users send messages to one another's phones, activating the appropriate sound on the recipient's handset. The sound file is then played on the recipient's phone automatically. Since a number of these sounds are meant to be humorously vulgar or inappropriate, this unprovoked sound is essentially an "attack" on the recipient's phone. Additional listings have also been included for special occasions, such as the Christmas season.
