= White Paper on El Salvador =

1981 US document

On February 23, 1981, the U.S. State Department released a document titled "Communist Interference in El Salvador: Documents Demonstrating Communist Support of the Salvadoran Insurgency", also known as "the White Paper". The document was used as justification for U.S. intervention in Nicaragua. Critics charged that the technique deployed by the White Paper was to correlate events in El Salvador into alleged examples of Soviet and Cuban military involvement. The White Paper was claimed to be part of a propaganda effort to divert attention from U.S. support for a repressive regime by creating a false threat of communist insurgency.

The White Paper was authored by U.S. State Department official Jon D. Glassman.

== Reception and subsequent criticism ==
The basic premise of the White Paper—that El Salvador was a victim of "indirect armed aggression by Communist powers"—was initially accepted by both the American press and congressional leaders. The "White Paper" used a variety of intelligence sources, including captured Salvadoran guerrilla documents, to show a flow of material support to the rebels from Nicaragua, Cuba, and a variety of other Communist countries, including the Soviet Union and Vietnam.

On May 18, 1981, The Washington Star published an op-ed, "Scarcely A Soviet Shadow in Salvador White Paper", by Jerome M. Segal, who worked on foreign aid issues in the U.S. Agency for International Development. Segal compared the claims in the White Paper with respect to the Soviet role with the text of captured documents released by the State Department as the basis for the White Paper. He showed that on the core assertion of Soviet involvement, the documents show a rather different picture. He focused on the trip report by Shafik Handal, Secretary General of the El Salvador Communist Party, relating the distinct lack of enthusiasm and commitment he received when he went to Moscow seeking military and financial support for his insurgency.

Segal's account, which was followed by a similar analysis in The Washington Post on June 9, was cited by independent journalist I.F. Stone when he addressed the National Press Club, and called attention to several important critiques. Stone himself was well known for his critique of the White Paper on Vietnam issued by the State Department in the 1960s.

On June 8, 1981, The Wall Street Journal reporter Jonathan Kwitney published "Apparent Errors Cloud US 'White Paper' on Reds in El Salvador", an article based on a three-hour interview with Glassman. In the article, Glassman admitted "mistakes and guessing" by the government's intelligence analysts who translated and explained the guerrilla documents. The White Paper, based on 19 captured guerrilla documents, was accepted as fact by the American press, with myriad U.S. government follow-up reports of plans for countering the activities alleged in the report. Yet Kwitney noted that a closer reading of the documents in the White Paper indicates that they were not written by guerrilla leaders. In the interview with Kwitney, Glassman admitted that most of the statistics cited in the document were extrapolated, and most of the information put forth in the documents wasn't in the purportedly captured documents at all. Kwitney noted, "A close reading of the white paper indicates ... that its authors probably were making a determined effort to create a 'selling' document, no matter how slim the background material."

After The Wall Street Journal article was released, Mr. Glassman declined further interviews to the press. Other news reports soon followed with negative assessments of the White paper. The State Department countered by defending the conclusions of the report.

== Legacy ==
Despite the criticism and apologetics, the White Paper was subsequently deemed "based on fairly solid intelligence" given the evidence available at the time. While a few journalists found some errors in the paper (e.g. Jonathan Kwitny in the Wall Street Journal), most of the claims have been substantiated, using declassified U.S. government documents, exfiltrated KGB documents, and other sources. In the estimation of historian William LeoGrande, the initial impact was more significant than the subsequent criticism:

"When the White Paper was fully dissected four months later and its core arguments thrown into doubt, it hardly mattered. The White Paper had done its job by helping to smooth the way for a policy change, and once the new policy was established, no after-the-fact debunking of the White Paper could turn back the clock."

== See also ==
- Cold War
- CIA activities in Nicaragua
- Jonathan Kwitny
- Jon D. Glassman
- Propaganda in the United States
