= Counterfeit electronic component =

Counterfeit electronic components are electronic parts whose origin or quality is deliberately misrepresented. Counterfeiting of electronic components can infringe on the legitimate producer's trademark rights. The marketing of electronic components has been commoditized, making it easier for counterfeiters to make it out into the supply chain.

== Trends ==
According to a January 2010 study by the US Department of Commerce Bureau of Industry and Security, the number of counterfeit incidents reported grew from 3,868 in 2005 to 9,356 in 2008. 387 respondents to the survey cited the two most common types of counterfeit components: 'blatant' fakes and used products re-marked as higher grade. The World Semiconductor Trade Statistics estimate that the global total addressable market (TAM) for semiconductors is in excess of $200 billion.

This increase in instances of counterfeit products entering the supply chain is characterized by globalization and the industries in China. On December 11, 2001, China was admitted to the WTO, which lifted the ban on exports by non-government owned and controlled business entities. In late 1989, the Basel Convention was adopted in Basel, Switzerland. Most developed countries have adopted this convention, with the major exception of the US. During this period, the United States has primarily exported its e-waste to China, where e-waste is recycled.

== Counterfeiting techniques ==
The alteration of existing units is done through sanding and re-marking, blacktopping and re-marking, or similar methods of concealing the original manufacturer. Other strategies involve device substitution and die salvaging, where cheaper or used components are passed off as new or more expensive ones. Manufacturing rejects may also be repurposed and sold as new, and component leads may be re-attached to give the illusion of a new, unused product. Packaging can also be relabeled.

== Avoidance strategies ==
Some known counterfeiting-detecting strategies include:

- DNA marking – Botanical DNA as developed by Applied DNA Sciences and required by the DoD's Defense Logistics Agency for certain 'high-risk' microcircuits.
- X-ray inspection
- X-RF inspection
  - X-ray fluorescence spectroscopy can be used to confirm RoHS status.
- Decapsulation – By removing the external packaging on a semiconductor and exposing the semiconductor wafer, microscopic inspection of brand marks and trademarks, and laser die etching.
- SAM (scanning acoustic microscope)
- Parametric testing, a.k.a., curve tracing
- Leak testing (gross leaks and fine leaks) of hermetically sealed components
- Stereo microscope, metallurgical microscope
- Solderability testing

For military products:

- QPL – Qualified Product List
- QML – Qualified Manufacturers List
- QSLD – Qualified Suppliers List of Distributors
- QTSL – Qualified Testing Suppliers List

=== Policies ===
The formation of the G-19 Counterfeit Electronic Components Committee was introduced. In April 2009, SAE International released AS5553 Counterfeit Electronic Parts; Avoidance, Detection, Mitigation, and Disposition.

AS6081 was issued in November 2012 and adopted by the DoD. AS6081 requires the purchased products to go through external visual inspections and radiological examinations. Originally implemented in January 2013, AS5553A was expanded.

== See also ==
- Capacitor plague
- Counterfeit consumer goods
- Supply-chain security
