= Global Trade Exchange =

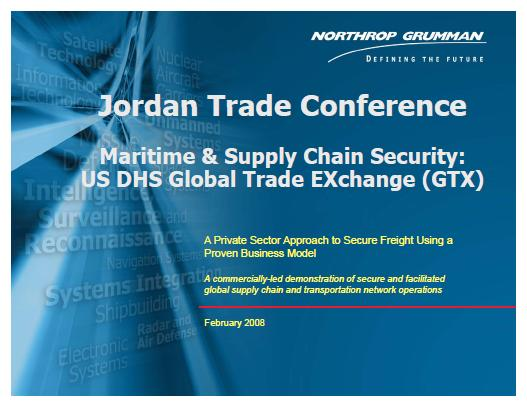
Global Trade Exchange (GTX) as presented by Northrop Grumman, at a U.S. Government-sponsored Trade and Investment Seminar, Amman, Jordan, 2008

The Global Trade Exchange (GTX) is, or was, a controversial homeland security intelligence project, related to cross-border trade financial data, being one of three pillars of the Safe Ports Act-related Secure Freight Initiatives. The Global Trade Exchange idea originated in 2004 from the Department of Homeland Security Intelligence and Analysis office, and between 2007 and 2008 was avidly promoted by the U.S. intelligence community, yet in March 2008 was suddenly placed in an "on hold" status. Described as a ready-to-buy, commercially available database, the GTX was rush-funded by Congress as part of and championed relentlessly by then-United States Secretary of Homeland Security Michael Chertoff in evident disregard of objections of confused and frustrated U.S. private sector trade groups.

The Global Trade Exchange was discussed in October 2007 in the House Homeland Security Meeting on Maritime Terrorism and the "Safe Ports Act". In the October 30, 2007 House Homeland Security Meeting on Maritime Terrorism meeting, Customs Commissioner Thomas Winkowski reported to House Representative Henry Cuellar that the Global Trade Exchange was a "data warehouse" about which a "series of meetings have been held", and that "our lawyers are trying to get our arms around it".

After a year-long spate of official support, media hype, and after award of Congressional funding of $13 million, the GTX was put "on hold for further study by the [U.S.] Navy" on April 2, 2008., for reasons still yet to-be explained. Touted by senior U.S. officials and Congress in 2007 as an anti-terrorism database for tracking long-haul shipping containers, the Global Trade Exchange's principal focus appears to have a different focus, notably advance trade-finance information for market-making purposes.

== DHS Intelligence Trade Data Project ==
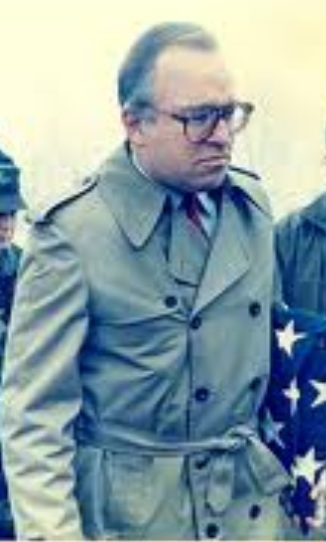
Jon D. Glassman, former State Department Official, currently Vice President for Government Affairs at Northrop Grumman, forwarded the Global Trade Exchange in the Asia-Pacific and Middle-East regions.

In Spring of 2007 DHS Secretary Michael Chertoff began to actively promote the Global Trade Exchange to the media and trade community as a commercial off-the-shelf (COTS) database, able to provide unique and vital national security protection from 'all hazards' threats. Senior DHS Customs officials described the GTX as a repository of corporate data, and transportation shipping data. Congress noted the GTX description as a COTS tool and placed it into the July 2007 Homeland Security Appropriations budget bill; this done above the vociferous objections of the U.S. private sector. Three major U.S. trade consortia gave written and spoken testimony to Congress, expressing concerns about the sudden arrival of this new tool and the secrecy surrounding it, and posed questions as to why the U.S. Government would be sharing collected corporate data with foreign governments, such as Secretary Chertoff described.

== Ports-related "Financial Services Data Warehouse" ==
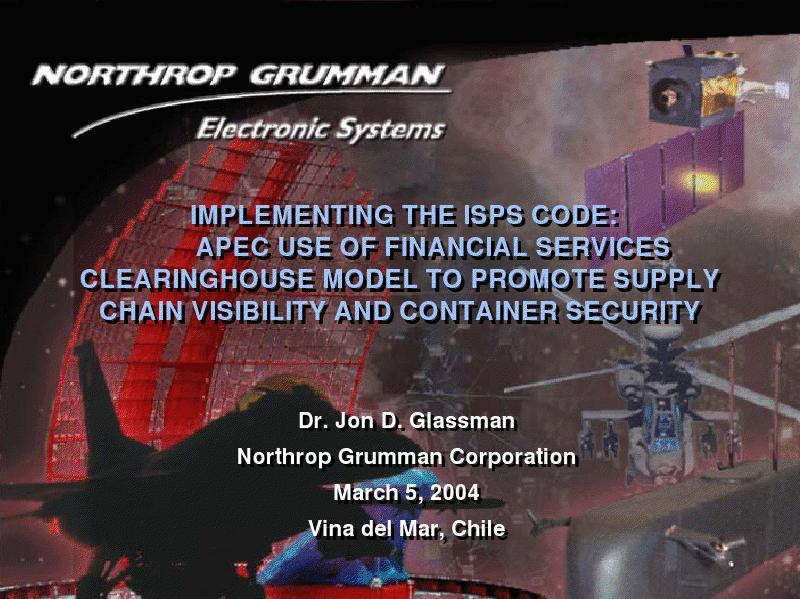
Financial Services Data Warehouse. The early version of the Global Trade Exchange, presented at APEC seminar, Chile 2004

ISPS Financial Services Data Warehouse for APEC Meeting 2004, Chile

GTX was championed by former State Department official Jon D. Glassman most famous for having drafted the White Paper on El Salvador and for serving as Chargé des Affairs in the U.S. Embassy in Afghanistan during CIA operations to support the Mujahadeen. Between 2004 and 2007, Mr. Glassman championed the Global Trade Exchange at various APEC counter-terrorism meetings and intergovernmental meetings in the Middle East, as a means of foregoing U.S. Congressional requirements for 100 per cent scanning of shipping containers.

As early as 2004, Ambassador Glassman proposed, at various APEC counter-terrorism seminars, the Global Trade Exchange as an unregulated financial exchange using port-shipping manifest data, i.e. as a Northrop Grumman-led Financial Services Data Warehouse. A relationship to stock-trading was clear, but the relationship to counter-terrorism not. Many U.S. financial services sector presented this kind of tool for hedge-fund risk management.

== 2007: DHS Secretary Chertoff spearheads project ==
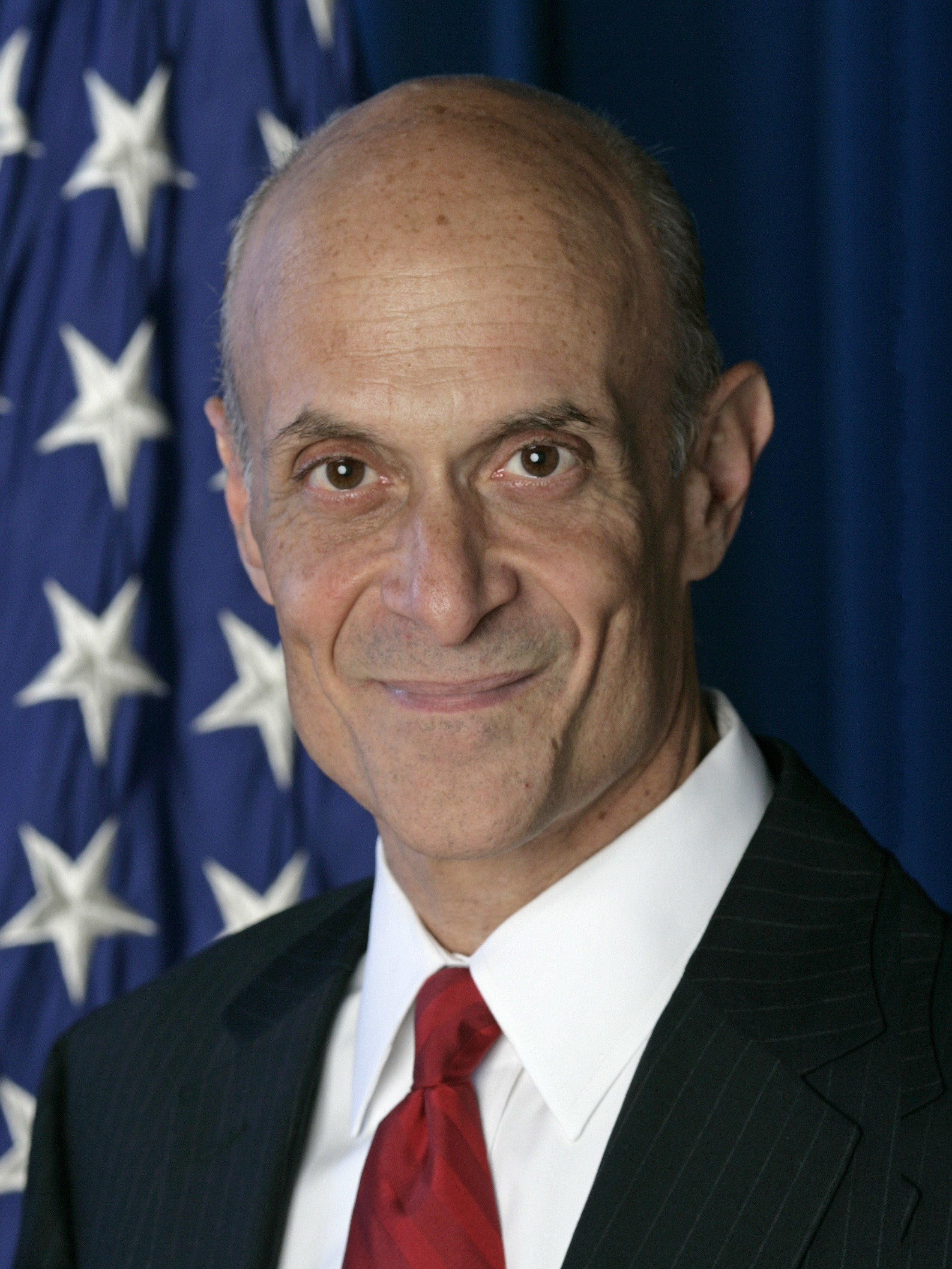
Michael Chertoff spearheaded the Global Trade Exchange as a DHS joint project with the DOD and ODNI.

Although never fully explained in terms of content, the Global Trade Exchange was noted as being one of the three pillars of the U.S. Customs and Border Protection (CBP) strategy for trade data-gathering.

Global Trade Exchange (GTX) was touted as a valuable DHS intelligence project which was "OTS" (off the shelf) and ready to acquire from a private-sector company in cooperation with foreign governments; data was to have been obtained on a voluntary basis by companies. On July 26, 2007 Senator Patty Murray added the GTX to the Department of Homeland Security Appropriations budget, by adding Amendment (S.2499) to another bill of Senator Robert Byrd and Senator Thad Cochran into H.R. 2638.

== Controversy about secrecy ==
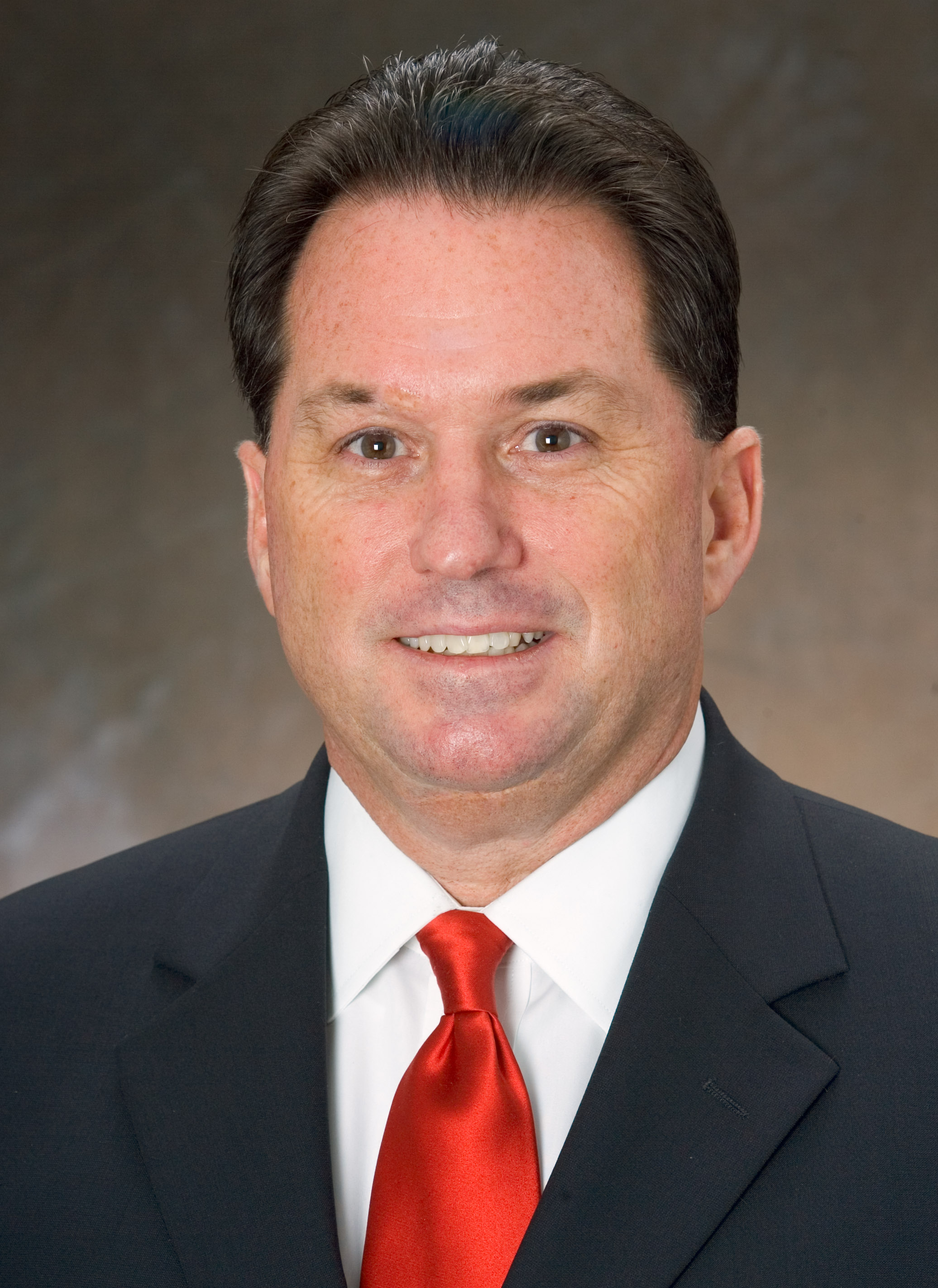
CBP Ahern presented the Global Trade Exchange at a Maritime Security Expo, November 2007.

U.S. trade groups expressed strong displeasure at the sudden implementation of the new project, as well as with the general lack of transparency, public interaction, and disclosure about GTX. These groups found the lack of information regarding justification for, and modalities such as were related to, data-sharing with foreign governments, particularly disturbing.

These U.S. trade groups provided formal complaints and testimony to various Federal agencies, as well as various Congressional Committees and Subcommittees. These communications noted concerns that they didn't know the business-reporting sources of data nor what the data were; these groups were normally very involved with such definitions. Also, DHS mentions of using the GTX to share private sector data with foreign governments caused US industry to express concerns about business data confidentiality. In December 2007, a request for quote and statement of work were put forth by the DHS.

== Congressional funding awarded in July 2007 ==
Despite the controversy, Global Trade Exchange was allocated $13 million as part of the DHS section of the 2008 Consolidated Appropriations Budget, in January 2008. Northrop Grumman presented the GTX in late February as part of wider DOD supply-chain "GEX" data-warehousing projects.

== "U.S. Attorneys involved in appropriating the database in October 2007 ==
On 30 October 2007, Deputy Commissioner of Customs Thomas S. Winkowski testified to Rep. Henry Cuellar that U.S. Attorneys were still trying to "go around the legal challenges that [the U.S. government] had in obtaining the database and that Customs was "Still trying to get our arms around" the Global Trade Exchange, so that they could "know what's inside it".

== Discussed by the Senate Finance Committee in March 2008 ==
On March 13, 2008, the Global Trade Exchange was discussed in the Senate Finance Committee, as part of the data-gathering program framework of the Homeland Security Department. The topic was presented by Mr. Sam Banks, Executive Vice President of Sandler and Travis Trade Advisory Services, the firm which won the no-bid award for the GTX in January 2008. Sandler, Travis and Rosenberg is a customs law and international trade consultancy firm known for management of the IBERC database used under the GATT textiles agreement, the Multifibre arrangement (MFA).

== Global Trade Exchange project ==
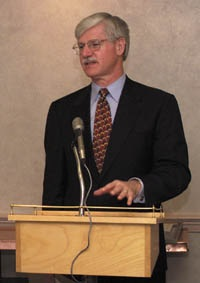
Sam Banks, a former Deputy Commissioner, U.S. Customs Authority working for U.S. trade law firm Sandler, Travis and Rosenberg, forwarded the Global Trade Exchange.

Despite that the GTX was, in principle, a ready-to-purchase database of corporate data which was collected, the actual content of the global trade exchange was never fully presented to either the media nor to U.S. trade groups. Clues to the premise of the project can be found in the GTX statement of work, provided in the 2008 request for quote, released to a small select group of companies, in December 2008.

The commercial transaction data was to have been run by a private company information broker performing the following functions:

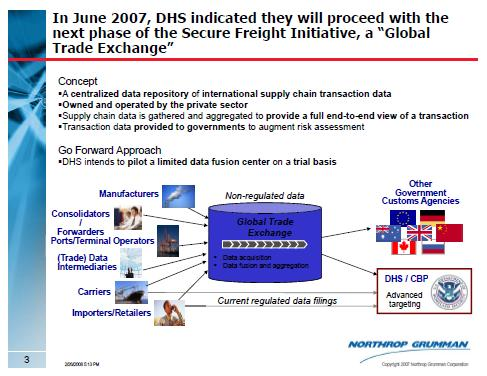
Global Trade Exchange (GTX) as presented by Northrop Grumman, at a U.S. Government-sponsored Trade and Investment Seminar, Amman, Jordan, 2008

- Collection, integration, and transmission of data and images from multiple sources;
- Coordinating the participation of all supply chain parties (e.g. foreign host governments & shippers) providing information to GTX;
- Establishing and maintaining all necessary communications and interfaces;
- Ensuring protection of all collected and/or transmitted by the GTX;
- Transmitting data to participating foreign government systems in compliance with foreign government requirements.

== March 2008: GTX on hold for further study ==
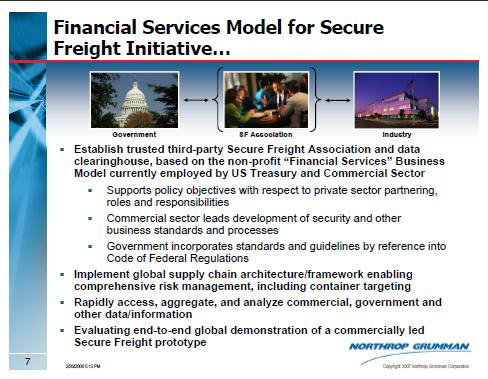
Global Trade Exchange (GTX) as presented by Northrop Grumman, at a U.S. Government-sponsored Trade and Investment Seminar, Amman, Jordan, 2008

Three weeks after public presentations at U.S. trade conferences, and two months after funding was awarded by Congress, DHS customs official Jayon Ahern announced publicly that the project was premature, and would be delayed for further study.; it remained delayed as from Basham's departure, yet is again part of the 2009 DHS appropriations budget and remains under study for future implementation. In the U.S. House, House Homeland Security Appropriations Chairman David Price (D-NC) has repeatedly expressed wishes for results on the project. As late as May 1, 2009 Commissioner Ahern was providing explanations to Congressman David Price about the DHS ongoing pursuit to find the commercially available COTS database.

== See also ==
- Chemical, biological, radiological, and nuclear
- Container Security Initiative
- Global Initiative to Combat Nuclear Terrorism
- Nuclear proliferation
- Proliferation Security Initiative
- United States House Committee on Homeland Security
