= International Business and Economic Research Center =

The International Business and Economic Research Corporation (IBERC) was a company which provided advice, research and analysis on a variety of trade related issues including trade preference programs, sourcing strategies and trade agreement negotiations, principally in the area of textiles and apparel. IBERC's principal products comprised a Quota Management Service (QMS) and consulting capabilities to help users to make use of the data. IBERC clients included principally US apparel and textile importers, retailers and designers as well as producing nation governments.

== Overview ==
IBERC's QMS was founded in the 1980s by lawyer, and former U.S. Army officer, Michael P. Daniels. In 1986, the chief executive, Walter Lenahan, a recently retired United States Department of Commerce official, was investigated 1986 by the U.S. Department of Justice for alleged activities on behalf of the Government of Israel in violation of the U.S. Foreign Agents Registration Act. No charges were ever made against Lenahan.

The principal use of IBERC's quota management system was by US apparel importers and retailers as well as apparel exporting country governments, dealing with the Multi Fibre Arrangement (MFA) which was managed under the GATT (General Agreement on Tariffs and Trade), i.e. principal clients were either textile/apparel manufacturers in these countries, US importing entities as well as the governments which were contracting-parties to the GATT. The IBERC database is currently owned and managed by firm Sandler, Travis and Rosenberg.

== House Subcommittee investigation of IBERC ==
In 1986, the House Subcommittee On Commerce, Consumer, And Monetary Affairs Of The Government Operations Committee investigated IBERC Vice President Walter Lenahan, verifying his compliance with ethics laws.

Lenahan was the former U.S. assistant secretary of Commerce for textiles and apparel, in relation to his move from the Commerce Department (International Trade Centre) to working with IBERC. The House Subcommittee investigated at that time if Lenahan had violated “conflict of interest” laws, “post employment” laws, “FARA-laws” (Foreign Agent Registration Act) laws and the subject of former U.S. ITA (International Trade Agency) officials who left-office to represent foreign governments was examined. The subcommittee concluded that Lenahan may have violated a conflict of interest provision of 18 U.S.C. 208. No charges were ever made against Lenahan.

== IBERC Continuing Operations ==
In the context of the House, and a Department of Justice investigation, certain IBERC executives (themselves also former US-ITA, U.S. Department of Commerce officials) left the firm, possibly taking certain intellectual property, including computer programs and created a new firm, International Development Systems, Inc. Still IBERC flourished and was a leader in the industry for decades.

== IBERC database and Sandler, Travis and Rosenberg ==
In 2003, IBERC was acquired by the firm Sandler, Travis and Rosenberg P.A.
