= Customs-Trade Partnership Against Terrorism =

Supply-chain security program

The Customs-Trade Partnership Against Terrorism (C-TPAT or CTPAT) is a voluntary supply-chain security program led by U.S. Customs and Border Protection (CBP) focused on improving the security of private companies' supply chains with respect to terrorism. The program was launched in November 2001 with seven initial participants, all large U.S. companies. As of December 1, 2014, the program had 10,854 members. The 4,315 importers in the program account for approximately 54% of the value of all merchandise imported into the U.S.

Companies who achieve C-TPAT certification must have a documented process for determining and alleviating risk throughout their international supply chain. This allows companies to be considered low risk, resulting in expedited processing of their cargo, including fewer customs examinations.

== Companies eligible to become CTPAT Certified ==
- US importers of record
- US Exporters
- US/Canada and US/Mexico cross-border highway carriers
- Mexico long-haul highway carriers
- Rail carriers
- Sea carriers
- Air carriers
- US marine port authority and terminal operators
- Consolidators (US air freight consolidators, ocean transportation intermediaries and non-vessel operating common carriers)
- Mexican manufacturers
- Canadian manufacturers
- Certain invited foreign manufacturers
- Licensed US customs brokers
- Third-party logistics providers
- Customs House Agent(CHA)providers

== CTPAT mutual recognition ==
Mutual recognition (MR) refers to those activities relates with the signing of a document between foreign customs administration that allows an exchange of information aiming to improve supply-chain security. The signed document, or MR, indicates that security requirements or standards of the foreign partnership program, as well as its validation procedures are similar. The essential concept of a mutual recognition agreement (MRA) is that CTPAT and the foreign program are compatible in both theory and practice so that one program will recognize the validation findings of the other program.

The following programs have mutual recognition with CTPAT:

- New Zealand Customs Service – Secure Export Scheme Program (SES) – June 2007
- Canada Border Services Agency – Partners in Protection Program (PIP) – June 2008
- Jordan Customs Department – Golden List Program (GLP) – June 2007
- Japan Customs and Tariff Bureau – Authorized Economic Operator Program (AEO) – June 2009
- Korean Customs Service – AEO Program – June 2010
- European Union – AEO Program – May 2012
- Taiwan – General of Customs, Taiwan Ministry of Finance’s – AEO Program.* – November 2012
- Israel – June 2014
- Mexico – October 2014
- Singapore – December 2014
- Peru – 2018
- *Note: This MRA is signed between the American Institute in Taiwan (AIT) and the Taipei Economic and Cultural Representative Office (TECRO) in the United States. C-TPAT and Taiwan AEO are the designated parties responsible for implementing the MRA.

Through this initiative, CBP is asking businesses to ensure the integrity of their security practices and communicate and verify the security guidelines of their business partners within the supply chain.

== Trusted Trader Program ==
When customs administrations offer tangible to businesses that meet minimum security standards and follow best practices, those businesses are known as “trusted traders.” This concept is internationally accepted and is entrenched in protocols such as the World Customs Organization SAFE Framework of Standards.

In North America, both CBP agency and the Canada Border Services Agency (CBSA) offer “trusted trader” programs, CBP’s Customs-Trade Partnership Against Terrorism (CTPAT) and the CBSA’s Partners In Protection (PIP) programs as well as the bi-national Free And Secure Trade (FAST) program. Efforts are underway to Harmonize the application process and the administration of such partner accounts.

In the US, CBP and the trade have been collaborating for some time to create a design for a holistic, integrated Trusted Trader Program that includes both security and compliance requirements. This approach will enable CBP to provide additional incentives to participating low risk partners, while benefiting from additional efficiencies of managing both supply chain security (CTPAT) and compliance (ISA) in one partnership program.

== See also ==
- Supply-chain security
- U.S. Customs and Border Protection
