= Freedom.gov =

Planned American state-controlled web portal

Freedom.gov is a planned web portal developed by the United States Department of State. The website's address was registered on 12 January 2026, with the intended purpose of providing internet users in Europe, China and other unspecified countries with VPN access to content, that may be censored by their country's respective governments. As of late September 2026, the web portal has not been publicly launched yet and its status remains unknown.

== Background ==
A State Department-run program called Internet Freedom, which funded grassroots groups that built technologies to circumvent Internet restrictions in countries such as the PRC, Iran and Venezuela, had its funding cut under DOGE initiatives in the second Trump administration.

Vice President JD Vance has criticized Europe for media censorship and content moderation.

== Overview ==
The portal is under development by the United States Department of State, with hosting on the servers of the Cybersecurity and Infrastructure Security Agency (CISA). Its stated goal is to give people from Europe and elsewhere, VPN access to content blocked by their governments, including content classified as hate speech and terrorism. Anonymous sources reported that the portal will have a built-in VPN that will allow users to disguise their traffic as coming from the United States. Other sources reported that activity of the portal's users will not be tracked and that it was made to "counter censorship".

Users, upon visiting the site, will see a motto: "Information is power. Reclaim your human right to free expression. Get ready". The website also features a logo depicting a ghostly horse galloping above the Earth. The creation of the portal was supposed to be announced at the Munich Security Conference in February 2026 but was delayed for unknown reasons. The development of the portal's website is overseen by Under Secretary of State for Public Diplomacy Sarah B. Rogers.

== Reception ==
In 2026, The Guardian reported that Madhu Gottumukkala, the [former] acting director of CISA had said: "The Cybersecurity and Infrastructure Security Agency (CISA) manages the .gov registrar to ensure that only verified U.S. Government organizations receive these trusted domains".

The disbanded Disinformation Governance Board, Executive Director (who resigned after 3 weeks) Nina Jankowicz called the website a "propaganda tool", criticizing its ties with CISA, and said it would help Europeans access hate speech, pornography, and child sexual abuse material.

Aisha Down of The Guardian said that the censorship the website claims to counter are restrictions on hate speech, outlined in the European Union's Digital Services Act and the United Kingdom's Online Safety Act, as opposed to "actual" internet censorship, such as in Iran and China. Some experts said that the future launch of the portal may escalate U.S.–Europe tensions.

Others see the move as a response primarily to internet censorship in China and Iran.
