= Airman's coin =

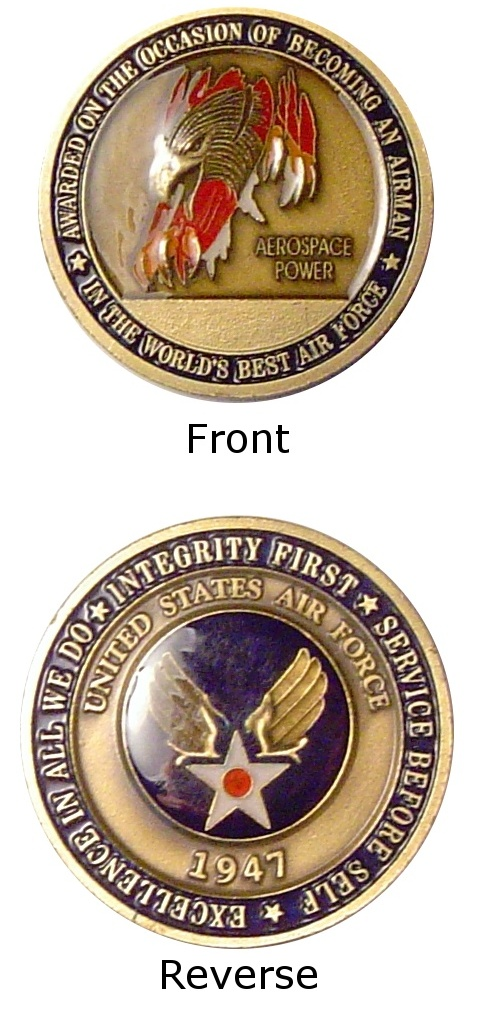
Original USAF Airman's Coin.

The Airman's coin is a challenge coin that is awarded to United States Air Force enlisted Airmen upon completion of Basic Military Training at Lackland AFB, Texas. After the award of the coin the individual is no longer referred to as "trainee," but as "airman," marking the successful completion of the first phase of training in becoming an airman in the United States Air Force.

== Award criteria and meaning ==
The Airman's coin is used to welcome new junior enlisted into the United States Air Force as well as to give the newest members a link to the heritage of the Air Force. The Airman's coin is awarded near the end of Basic Military Training and marks the transition from trainee to airman. It is usually awarded by a Wing Commander or Command Chief Master Sergeant, but may also be awarded by other personnel such as the Chief Master Sergeant of the Air Force or even the trainee's own military training instructor. The Airman's coin typically is the first challenge coin awarded to airmen and is the foundation for an airman's unique challenge coin collection.

== Description ==
The original version of the Airman's coin features on one side an eagle clawing its way out of the coin with the words "Aerospace Power" underneath it. The entire image is circled with the sentence "Awarded on the occasion of becoming an airman in the world's best Air Force". The reverse of the coin has a white star with a red dot in the center, known as a Hap Arnold star, flanked by a pair of wings. The symbol recalls the Air Force's roots in the Army Air Corps. The symbol is surrounded by the text of the Core Values of the Air Force: Integrity First, Service Before Self, Excellence In All We Do.

The currently issued Airman's coin replaces the eagle completely, having the new United States Air Force Symbol in its place in dark blue, itself based on the Hap Arnold star on the reverse.

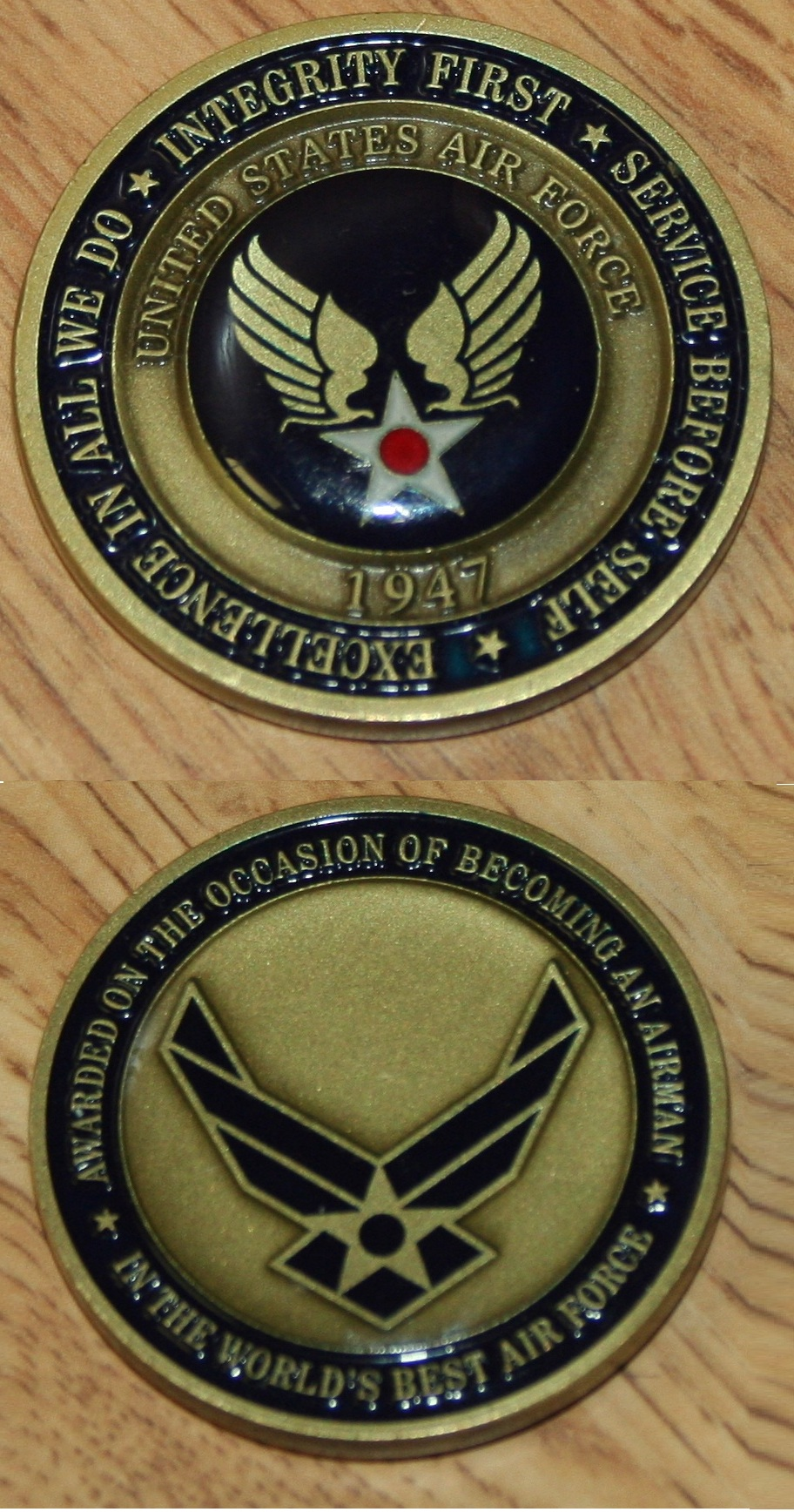
Current USAF Airman's coin.

== Other coins ==
Similar challenge coins are awarded to commissioned officers upon completion of their accessions training, such as successful completion of the Reserve Officers' Training Corps curriculum or Officer Training School (OTS), or graduation from the Air Force Academy.

As of 2021, the OTS challenge coin design consists of the Air Force prop and wings on the front, with the words "awarded on the occasion of becoming an officer in the world's greatest air force" surrounding. Two Hap Arnold stars break the words. The reverse contains the OTS crest, with the words "Officer Training School" and "Always with Honor" surrounding. Two Air Force symbols break the words.
