= Challenge coin =

Coin or medallion bearing an organization's insignia or emblem

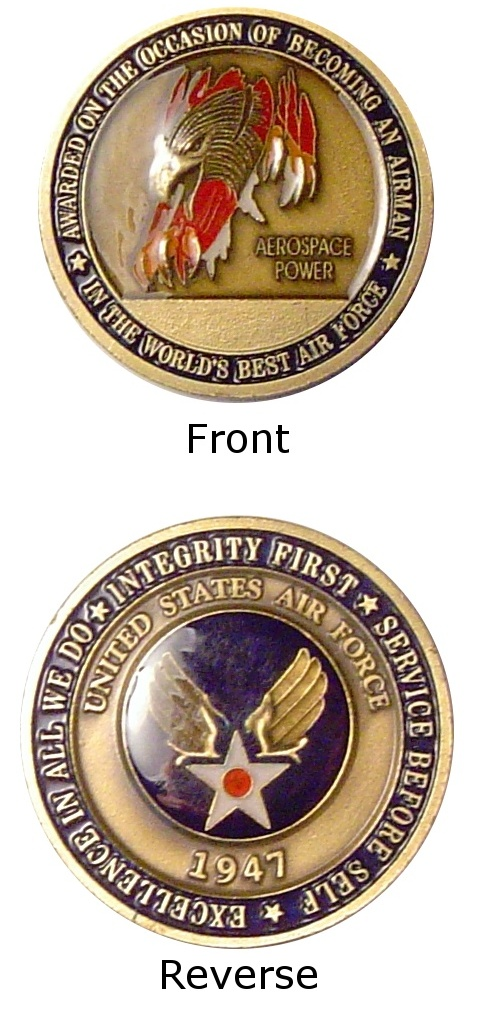
Original United States Air Force Airman's coin.

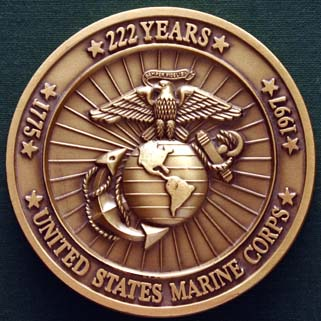
The front of a U.S. Marine Corps birthday ball medallion

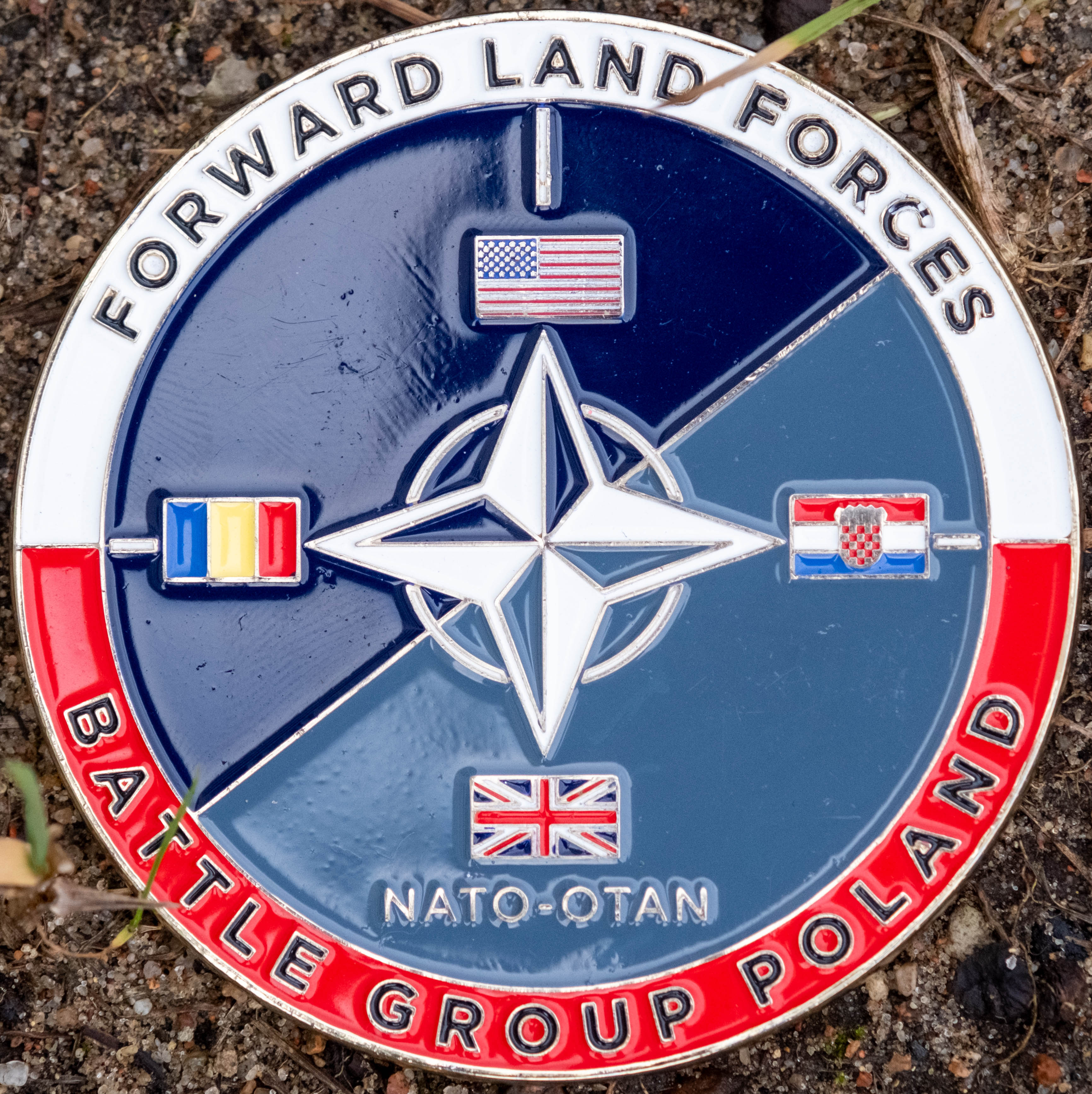
NATO challenge coin awarded during the 2024 Norwegian Foot March at Bemowo Piskie Training Area, Poland

A challenge coin, also known as military coin, unit coin, memorial coin, or commander's coin, is a small coin or medallion, bearing an organization's insignia or emblem and carried by the organization's members. Traditionally, they might be used to prove membership to the issuing organization when asked (the "challenge") or as a commemorative award. Historically, challenge coins have been presented by unit commanders in recognition of special achievement by a member of the unit, or the unit as a whole. They have also been exchanged in recognition of visits to an organization.

Modern challenge coins are made in a variety of shapes and sizes and often include pop-culture references, including superheroes and other well-known characters.

== Origins ==
There are several stories detailing the origins of the challenge coin, however the historicity of these stories is unclear.

=== Pre World War One ===
The Roman Empire rewarded soldiers by presenting them with coins to recognize their achievements. In Roman armies, if soldiers excelled in battle one day, they would receive their typical day's wages along with a separate bonus coin each. According to some accounts, these bonus coins were specially minted, featuring the marks of the legions from which they came. As a result, some soldiers apparently kept their coins as mementos, instead of spending them.

Coins known as "Portrait Medals" during the Renaissance were often used to commemorate specific events involving royalty, nobility, or other individuals. The medals would be given as gifts or awards, and people also exchanged them with friends and associates. The most common format was for one side to depict the patron while the other showed something that represented that individual's family, i.e.: the family's coat of arms.

The first instance of using a coin as a response to an actual challenge may come from the 17th-century religious wars in France. Following King Louis XIV's 1685 revocation of the Edict of Nantes, French Protestants began to suffer persecution by the state for their religion. Many Protestants fled France to find religious freedom elsewhere. Among those who chose to remain in France were some from a Protestant group known as Huguenots who were forced to conduct their religious services in secret. In order to avoid infiltration by state spies, the Huguenots began to carry their méreau communion coin. When challenged while trying to gain entry to Protestant church services, the Huguenot would produce his méreau coin as a token to show allegiance with the Protestant Church and be admitted entry.

=== Post World War One ===
According to one story, challenge coins originated in American volunteer flying squadrons during World War I.

In one squadron, a wealthy lieutenant ordered medallions struck in solid bronze and presented them to his unit. One young pilot placed the medallion in a small leather pouch that he wore about his neck. Shortly after acquiring the medallion, the pilot's aircraft was severely damaged by ground fire. He was forced to land behind enemy lines and was immediately captured by a German patrol. In order to discourage his escape, the Germans took all of his personal identification, but left the small leather pouch around his neck. Managing to escape German custody, he ended up being discovered by French forces in a nearby town. Suspected of being a saboteur and with no way to prove his identity, he was able to show them the medallion which contained his squadron insignia. This eventually led to his identification. Back at his squadron, it then became tradition to ensure that all members carried their medallion or coin at all times.

Another story states that the tradition started during the Vietnam War, when an infantry-run bar tried to keep non-infantrymen away by forcing "outsiders" to buy drinks for the whole bar if they couldn't prove they had been in combat. The "proof" started with enemy bullets, then got a little out of control with grenades, rockets and unexploded ordnance. So, a coin-sized item emblazoned with the unit's insignia became the accepted form of proof. In another story, challenge coins were created to prove identity to the 10th Special Forces Group, as so many soldiers were claiming to belong to the elite group that presenting the "challenge coin" became the only way to know for sure.

Despite the number of "origins" for challenge coins, the oldest surviving challenge coin belongs to the 17th Infantry Regiment, which were minted by then-Colonel William "Buffalo Bill" Quinn during 1950 to 1958 to mark the end of the military tour.

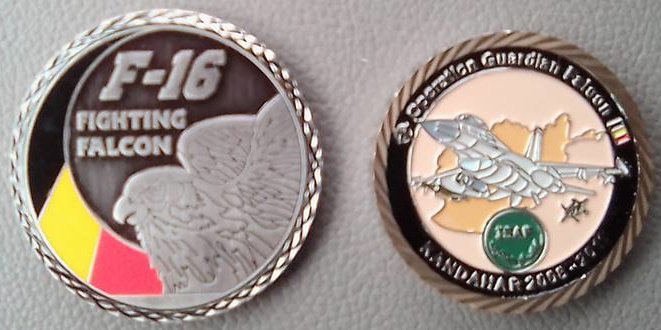
Two coins issued by various units of the Belgian Air Component

The challenge coin tradition eventually spread to other US military units, in all branches of service, and even to non-military organizations as well such as the United States Congress, which produces challenge coins for members of Congress to give to constituents.

== Challenging ==
The tradition of a "challenge" is connected to the history of challenge coins, and is used as a way to prove identification or affiliation through the presenting of the necessary coin. There are no formal rules of how a challenge may occur, or the punishment for not being able to present a coin, and often vary between organizations. The act of challenging is sometimes called a "coin check".

The challenge, which can be usually be made at any time, is most often associated with drinking establishments like bars. Everyone being challenged must immediately produce the coin for their organization and the usual punishment for failing to do so is buying a round of drinks for the challenger and everyone else who has their challenge coin.

Traditionally, rules of a challenge also include a prohibition against defacing the coin, especially if it makes it easier to carry at all times. In these instances, challenge coins usually no longer qualify as a challenge coin for the purposes of a challenge.

== Within the United States ==
Most units within the United States Military have their own challenge coin that they issue to members. Coins are also issued by military bases, or to mark certain commemorative events such as operations or missions, anniversaries, or meetings with important leaders. They, therefore, are an important part of US military and veteran culture. Military officials occasionally give them to non-military personnel for outstanding service or rewards, like the case of student athletes at Northeastern University.

In the Air Force, military training instructors award an airman's coin to new enlisted personnel upon completion of their United States Air Force Basic Military Training and to new officers upon completion of the Air Force Officer Training School.

=== U.S. presidents ===
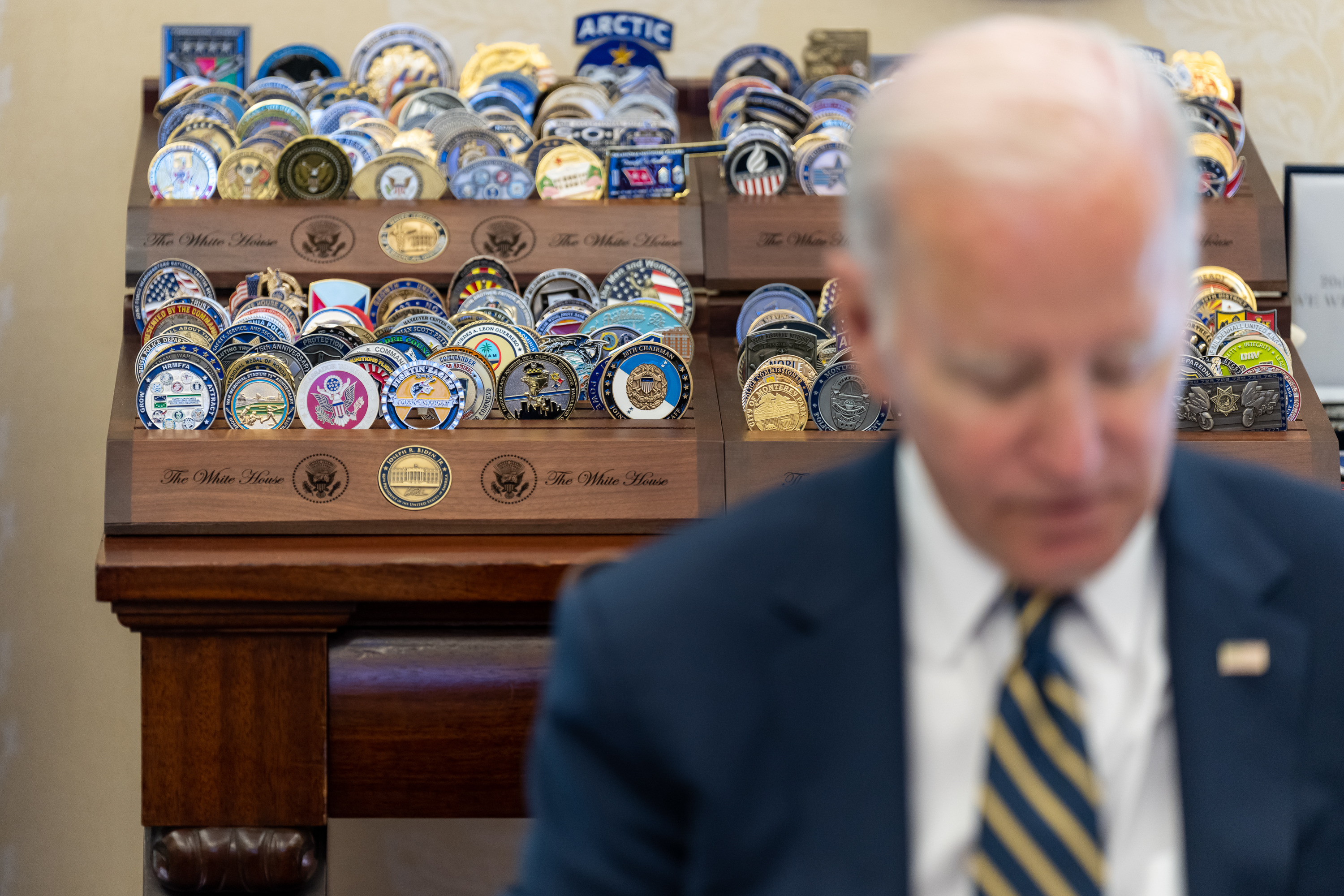
President Joseph Biden and his extensive challenge coin collection in the White House in 2023

Challenge coins issued by US presidents date back to the late 1990s. Separately, the White House Communication Agency (WHCA) has issued challenge coins for foreign heads and military during presidential visits. In May 2018, controversy arose when WHCA released a coin featuring President Donald Trump and North Korean dictator Kim Jong-un ahead of peace talks scheduled for June 2018 in Singapore.

President Bill Clinton displayed several racks of challenge coins, which had been given to him by U.S. service members, on the credenza behind his Oval Office desks. These coins are currently on display at the Clinton Library. The challenge coins appear in the background of his official portrait, now hanging in the White House.

President Barack Obama, in addition to handing challenge coins to U.S. service members, would leave coins on the memorial graves of dead soldiers.

President Donald Trump's coin broke with tradition, omitting the presidential seal, the motto "E pluribus unum" and the thirteen arrows representing the thirteen original states. His campaign slogan "Make America Great Again" appears on both sides. It features a banner at the bottom, which also serves as a base allowing the coin to stand upright.

President Joe Biden's coin depicts his home state of Delaware and "261st" for the 261st Theater Tactical Signal Brigade of the Delaware Army National Guard, his late son Beau Biden's unit.

=== Outside the military ===
Challenge coins are also exchanged outside the military. NASCAR, the NFL, members of the Civil Air Patrol, Eagle Scouts, Canine Companions, and World Series of Poker all have their own challenge coins. They are also becoming popular with police departments, fire departments, labor unions, and fraternal organizations. The obverse of a fire department coin usually uses the classic image of a firefighter, while the engraving on the reverse uses the prayer text. In 2007, the Utah Symphony and Opera gave challenge coins to all of its staff and musicians, making it the first symphony organization in America to do so. Franklin Public School in Ontario has a coin that is given to graduates, featuring its mascot 'Frankie'. Many non-profits, especially those with connections to the military, give challenge coins to donors to acknowledge their support of the organization. The FBI's Crisis Response unit was the first unit in the FBI to issue coins to unit members in late 1980s. Memorial coins can be used to commemorate fallen officers. An "unofficial" coin with mocking imagery and wording was distributed within United States Border Patrol following the 2021 Haitian migrant whip controversy.

==== New York City Police Department ====
Coins have been created by the Police Benevolent Association for NYPD precincts. One of these coins, which was used as a fundraiser dedicated to an officer in the 67 Pct. who was injured in the line of duty, has been criticized for containing racist imagery despite the officer being of Afro American West Indian descent.

==== Motorcycle clubs ====
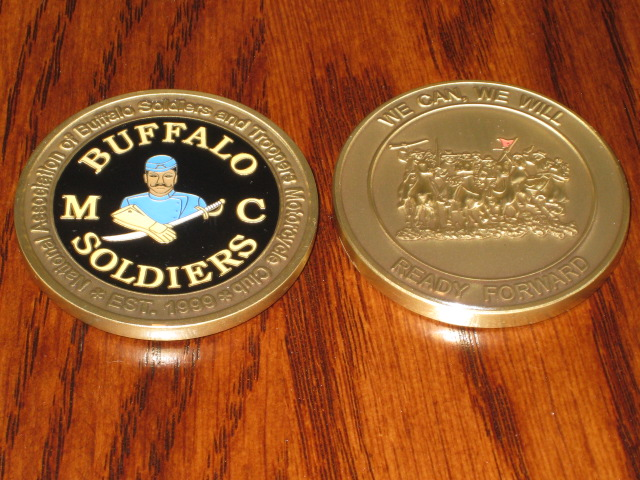
Members of the National Association of Buffalo Soldiers and Troopers Motorcycle Club must earn their challenge coin.

Another organization in which challenge coins have gained popularity is the "National Association of Buffalo Soldiers and Troopers Motorcycle Club" (NABSTMC), which has over 85 chapters totaling over 2,000 members. The coin must be earned by the members for a noteworthy accomplishment.

In 2009, the Harley Owners Group (HOG) created and made available its own challenge coin to Harley-Davidson motorcycle owners.

==== Media, business, and education ====
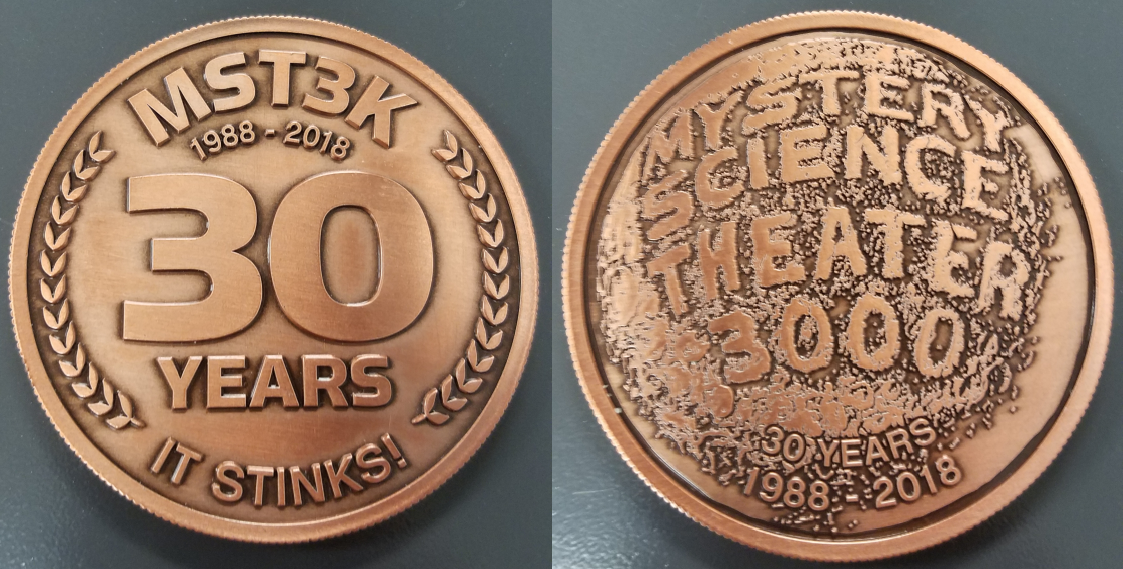
Front and back of the 30th Anniversary Commemorative MST3K Challenge Coin from the 2018 "Watch Out For Snakes!" Live Tour

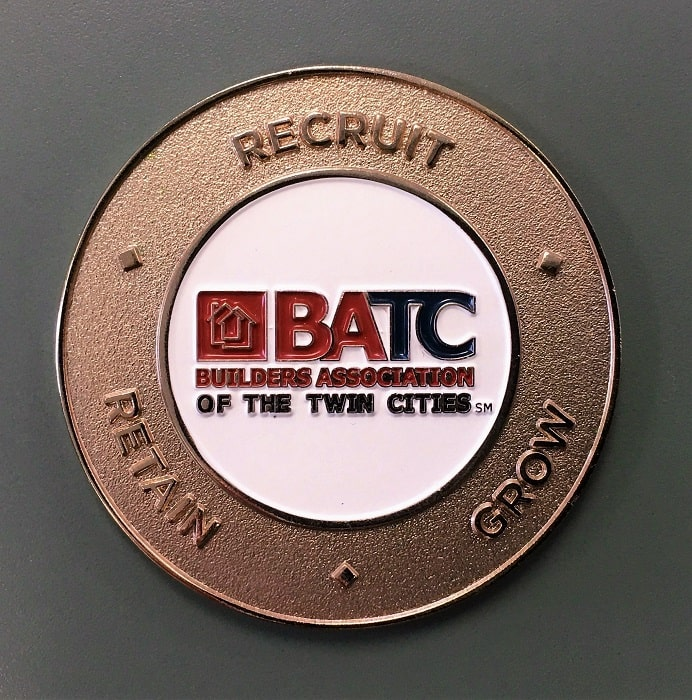
Challenge coin

Numerous examples illustrate challenge coins handed out in the media industry:

In 2020, a challenge coin went viral when America's largest challenge coin retailer released a coin about an incident that occurred with Connecticut state trooper Matthew Spina.

In 2020, the secretary of the State of Virginia sent a cease and desist to Louis "Uncle Louie" Gregory regarding a challenge coin he created.

In 2022, the president of the United States announced that the U.S. Government would investigate the origins of a Border Patrol Challenge coin. The coin was later debated on the House Floor by the U.S. Congress.

In his audio commentary for the DVD release of Iron Man 2, film director Jon Favreau notes that he had Iron Man 2 challenge coins made to distribute to United States Air Force personnel as a gesture of thanks for their cooperation while the production (and its predecessor, Iron Man) filmed on location at Edwards Air Force Base.

Bill Prady, executive producer of The Big Bang Theory, gave the Big Bang Theory "executive producer's challenge coin" to the crew of the last space shuttle.

On the "Rockets" episode of Lock N' Load with R. Lee Ermey, R. Lee (Gunny) Ermey presents a challenge coin to Second Lieutenant Carr as a reward for being the "top gun" in his class with the Javelin Portable Rocket Launching System.

Members of the American Radio Relay League who are volunteer examiners may carry the VEC (volunteer examiner coordinator) challenge coin. These members are responsible for administering Federal Communications Commission sanctioned examinations that allow successful applicants to qualify as amateur radio operators in the three different license categories of: technician, general, and amateur extra.

The crew of Breaking Bad were given challenge coins designed by show creator Vince Gilligan for each new season. Another challenge coin was also included in the Blu-ray set of the entire series of the show.

Video game companies like Treyarch gave these coins with certain packages for the release of Black Ops 2.

The crowdfunded movie Lazer Team gave challenge coins to its backers as an optional perk of funding the movie.

Meanwhile, examples can also be found in the realms of business and education. Many businesses are using corporate coins to recognize staff achievements, improve employee morale and reduce turnover,

==== Labor unions ====
Many labor unions, including the International Brotherhood of Electrical Workers and the International Association of Firefighters, have adopted the practice of selling and/or disseminating challenge coins.

== Canada ==
The challenge coin for Royal Canadian Sea Cadets Corps LONGUEUIL

One of the first appearance of a challenge coin within the Canadian Forces was that of the Canadian Airborne Regiment. Although conceptualized in the early 1970s, it was not officially adopted until the regiment returned from Cyprus in 1974.

Recognized as an "Americanism", the widespread use of challenge coins is new to the Canadian Forces and was introduced by General Rick Hillier as the Canadian Army began to work more closely with the US military. While many regiments and military establishments purchase them as 'challenge coins', most branches and schools within the Canadian Forces use them for presentation purposes.

The first Royal Canadian Air Force coin belonged to 427 Squadron. Back in the Second World War, 427 and the film studios Metro-Goldwyn-Mayer (MGM) shared the lion as their respective symbol. During a ceremony held on 27 May 1943, a bronze statuette of a lion was presented to the squadron as were MGM's coins for the squadron members. These coins granted free access to the MGM's theaters in Britain and were popular with aircrew and ground crew alike. In 1982, the custom was reintroduced by Lieutenant-Colonel Hugh Cunnigham, then the squadron commanding officer; it has since expanded widely within the RCAF tactical aviation community.

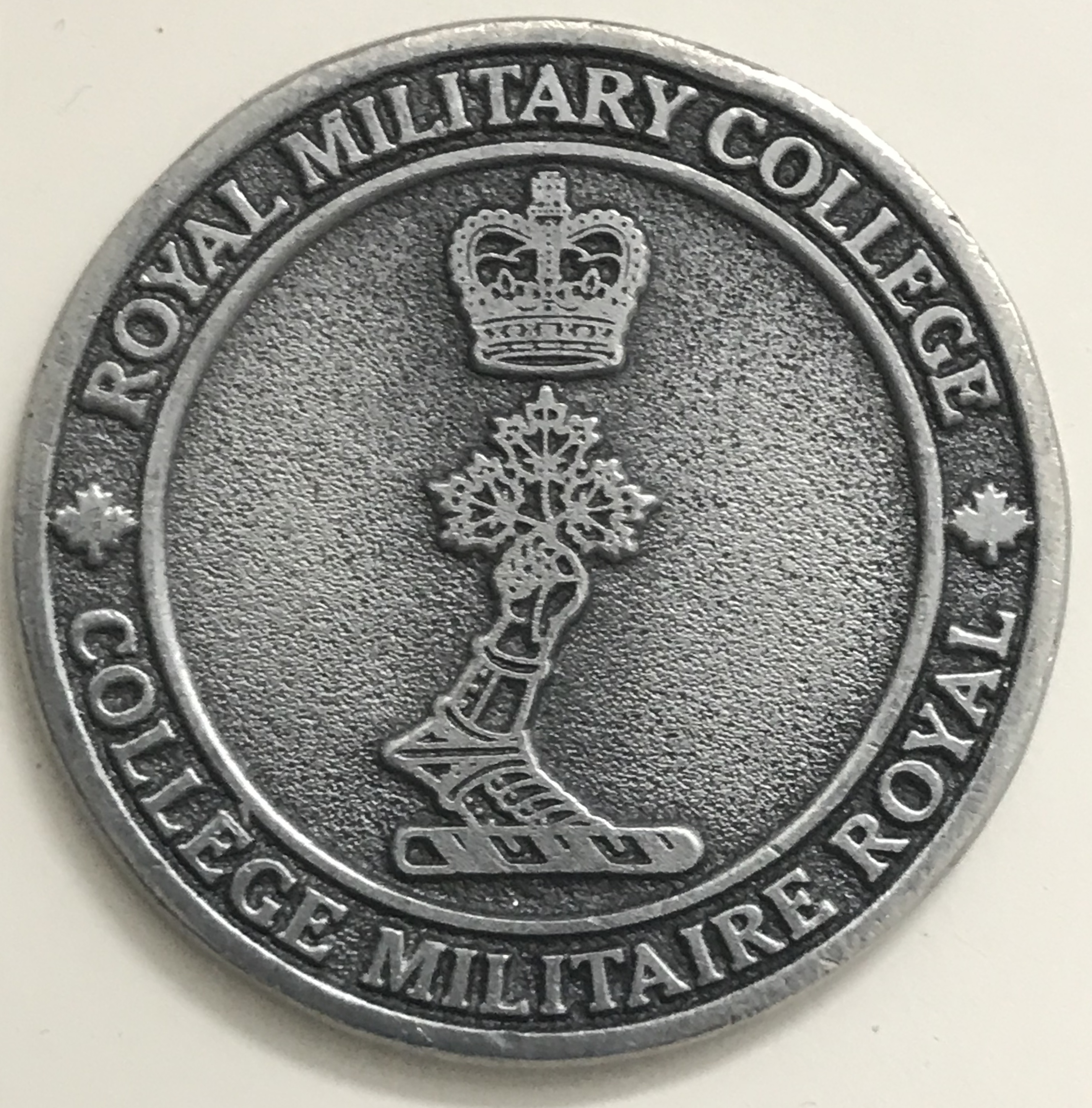
(obverse)

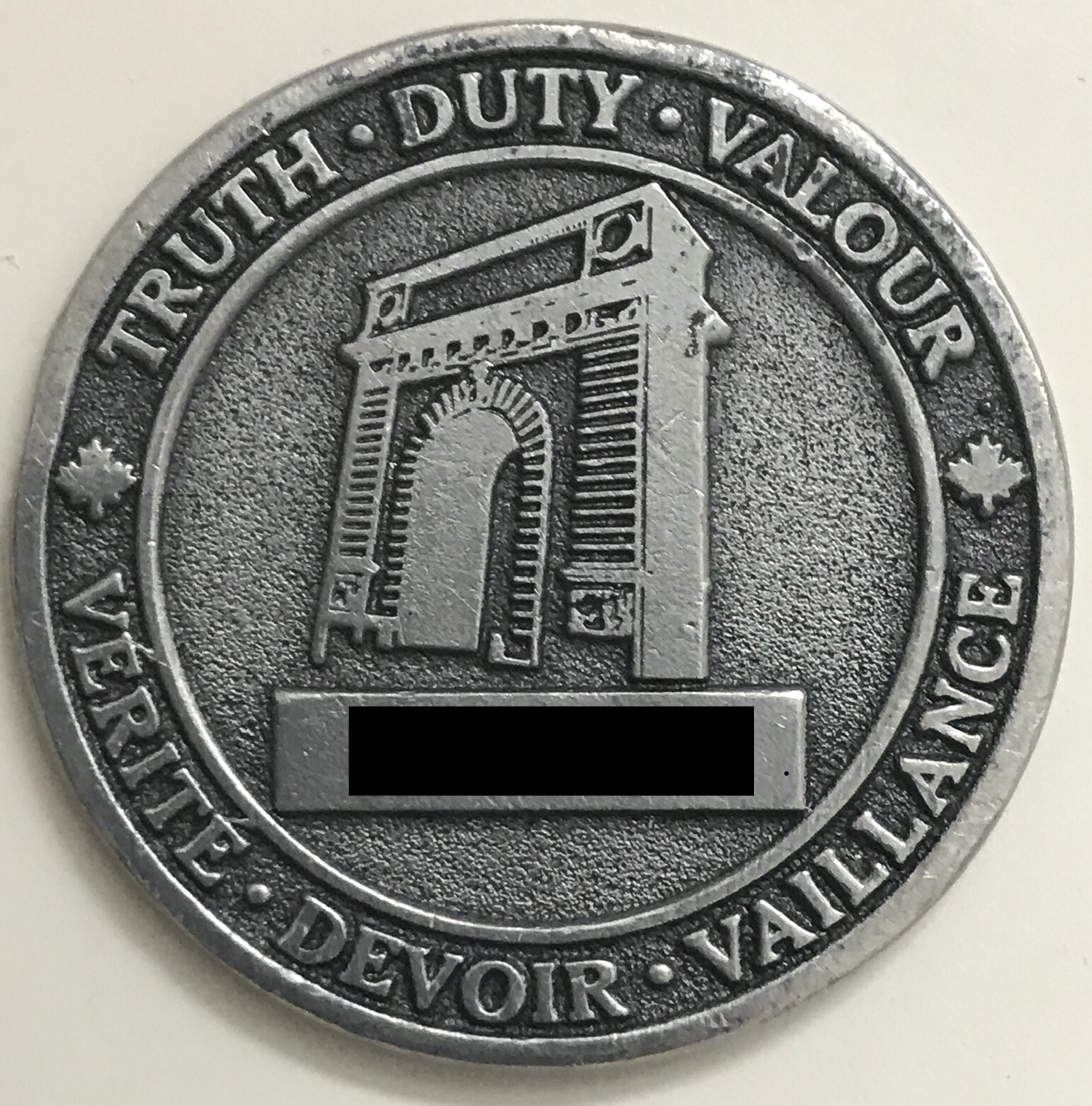
(reverse)

Challenge Coin, Royal Military College of Canada

Every new officer cadet at the Royal Military College of Canada in Kingston, Ontario, is issued a challenge coin upon completion of First-Year Orientation Period. The coin is engraved with the name of the college in French and English surrounding the college's coat of arms on the obverse. The cadet's college number and the Memorial Arch is on the reverse surrounded by the motto in both languages.

Members of the Corps of Royal Canadian Electrical and Mechanical Engineers (RCEME) Fund are issued challenge coins with the current RCEME badge and the member's branch fund membership number on the obverse side, and the original pre-unification RCEME badge and branch motto on the reverse side. Usually, these are issued to craftsmen at the Canadian Forces School of Electrical and Mechanical Engineering, in Borden, Ontario, where branch fund membership is first offered.

The coin from Commander Canadian Special Operations Forces Command is a dull colour, but distinct by its pierced sections.

Many of the CF training centres and staff colleges have a distinct coin—some available for the students to purchase, others available only by presentation by the establishment or the commandant for exemplary achievement while attending the facility. General (retired) Walter Natynczyk, when he was Chief of the Defence Staff, and the Canadian Forces Chief Warrant Officer often presented their personalized coins to deserving soldiers.

Police, corrections, security and fire departments have embraced the concept, and have found coins to be an excellent means of team building and creating a sense of brotherhood or belonging. Many feature a patron saint, badge or representative equipment.

== Switzerland ==
The challenge coin tradition was introduced into the Swiss Armed Forces by American officers on training missions and other assignments for the Organization for Security and Co-operation in Europe, of which Switzerland is a member. Coins are not issued, but rather ordered and paid for by Swiss officers of various branches within the Army.

== Australia and New Zealand ==
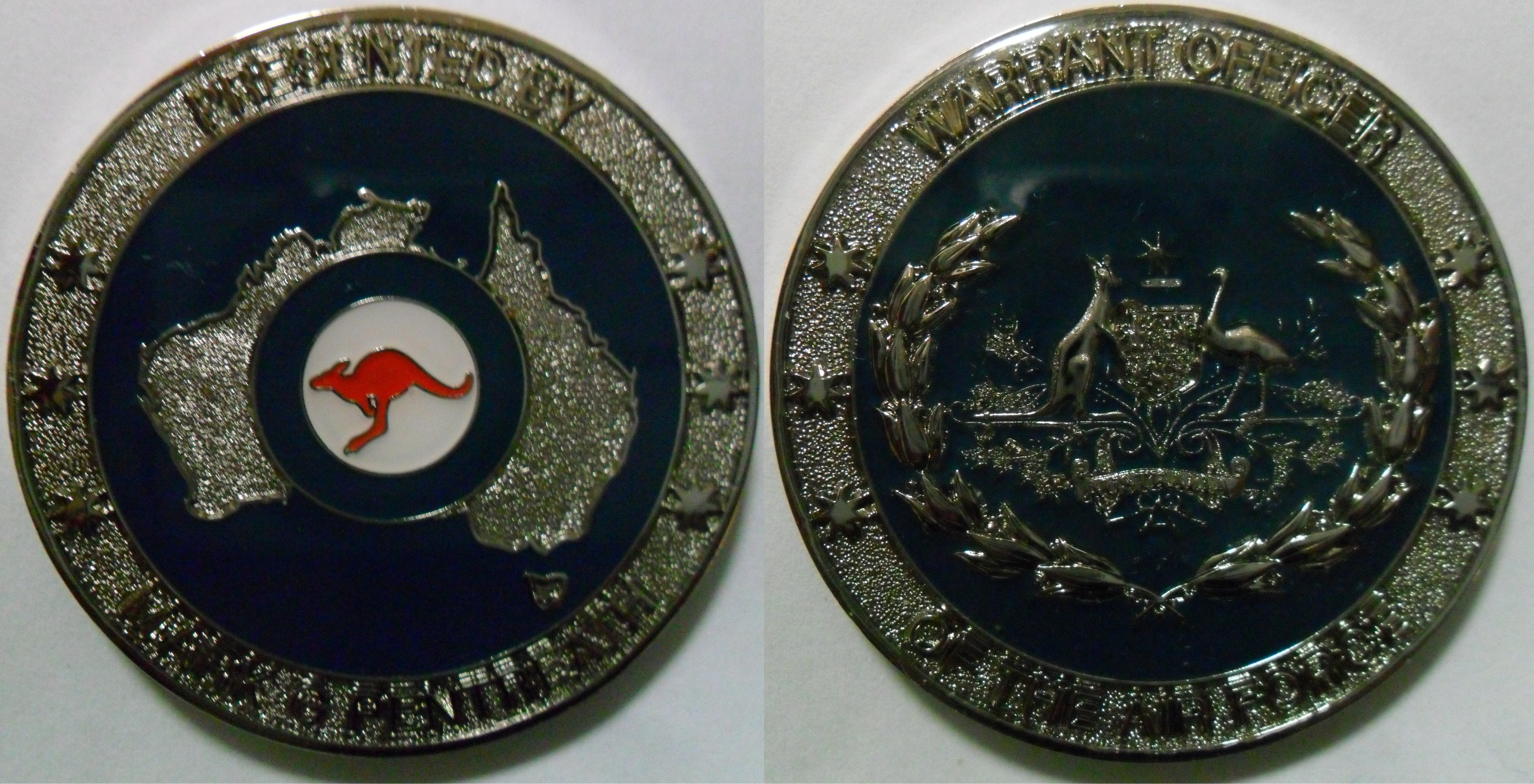
Challenge coin of the Warrant Officer of the Air Force, Royal Australian Air Force, specifically, WOFF-AF Mark Pentreath (7th WOFF-AF)

Coins have come into use by various Australian and New Zealand political leaders, senior officers and NCOs, under the influence of presentations from American personnel. Several hundred types of New Zealand challenge coins have been produced in recent decades.

== United Kingdom ==
Exchange officers and British military visitors to US units and formations in recent decades have often been presented with challenge coins. The British Army has had challenge coins for recruiting purposes since the mid-2000s, for example the Special Air Service and Royal Engineer units have such challenge coins. British military medical units also discovered the tradition while working with American units in Iraq and Afghanistan. The Department of Military Anesthesia and Critical Care has been issuing a coin since 2006.

Tradition dictates that challenge coins are shown within social environments (see above) with the loser of the "coin check" purchasing drinks for those others involved. Following a turbulent period of change within the British Military, commanders have tightened restrictions on the consumption of alcohol and any activity that encourages drinking, leaving the traditional challenge coin as a collection item.

== See also ==
- Airman's coin
- Medal
- Awards and decorations of the United States Armed Forces
