= Jennifer Daskal =

American lawyer

Jennifer C. Daskal
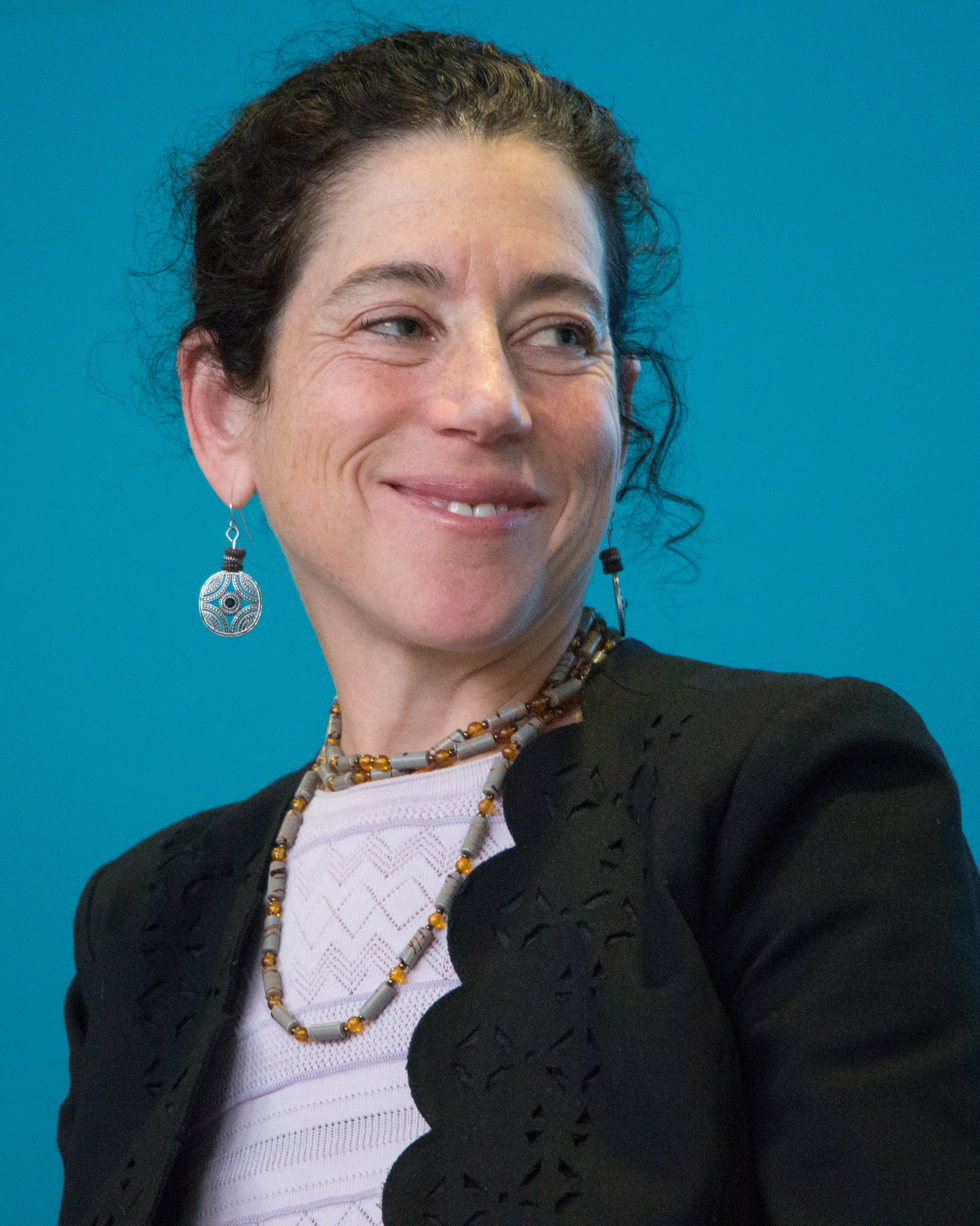
- Daskal in January 2018
- Born: 1972 (age 53–54)
- Education: Harvard Law School; University of Cambridge; Brown University
- Occupation: lawyer
- Known for: senior counsel for Human Rights Watch

Jennifer C. Daskal (born 1972) is a professor of law and faculty director of the Tech, Law, Security Program at the Washington College of Law at American University in Washington, D.C. Her work focuses on terrorism, national security, and criminal law.

She previously served as senior counsel for Human Rights Watch, where she focused on similar issues. She also worked in the U.S. Department of Justice during the Obama administration, which was seeking to prosecute terror suspects through the criminal justice system instead of through military tribunals.

== Career ==
A graduate of Harvard Law School, the University of Cambridge, and Brown University and a Marshall Scholar, Daskal garnered attention after traveling to the countries to which Guantanamo detainees had been released to verify that those countries were abiding by the undertakings they made to the U.S. federal government to respect the returned detainees' human rights.

Daskal is a professor of law at American University.

In April 2022, Daskal was announced as a member of the Disinformation Governance Board for the U.S. Department of Homeland Security. Daskal co-led the Disinformation Governance Board immediately after it was constituted, and Daskal co-developed the Disinformation Governance Board Charter.
