= Taylor Lorenz =

American journalist (born 1984/85)

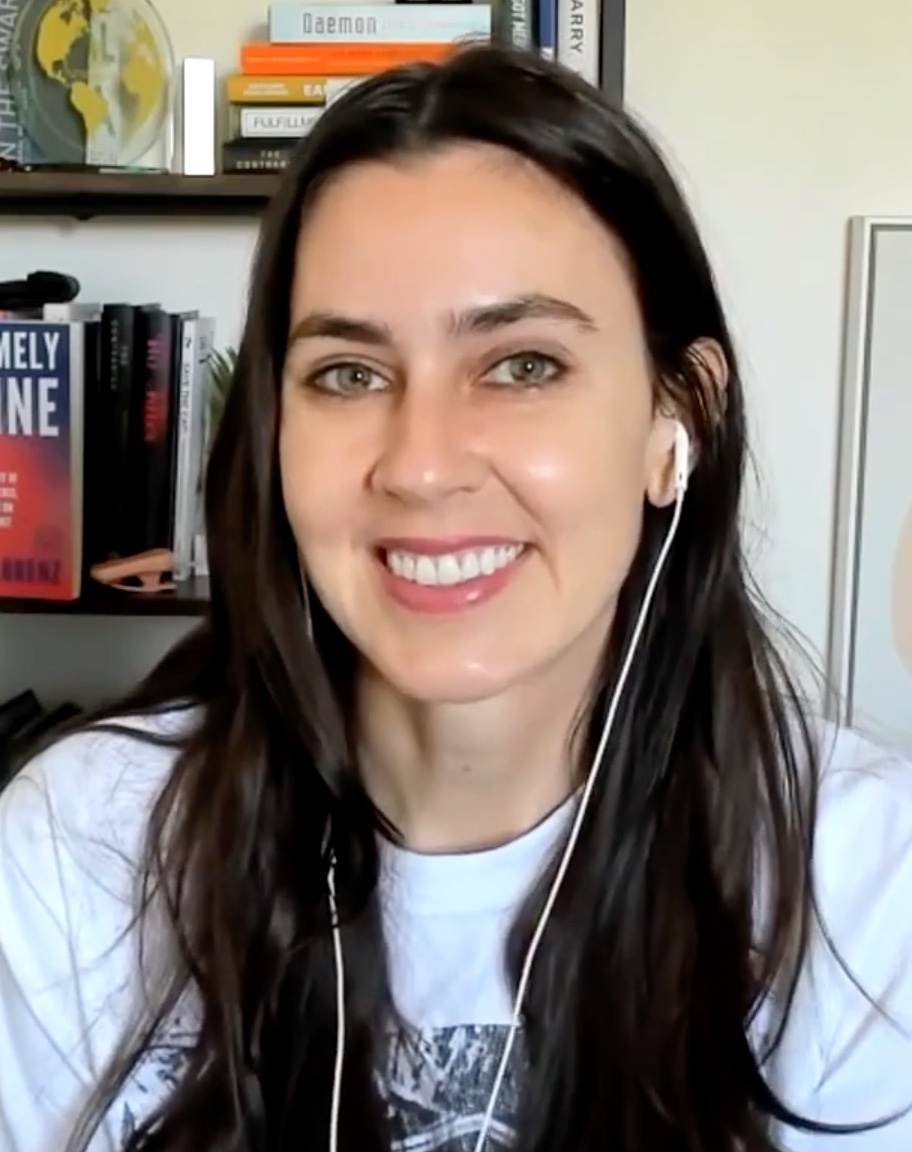
- Lorenz in 2023
- Born: 1984 or 1985 (age 41–42); New York City, New York, U.S.
- Education: University of Colorado, Boulder (attended); Hobart and William Smith Colleges (BA)
- Website: Official website

Taylor Lorenz (born 1984 or 1985) is an American journalist and technology columnist who covers Internet culture. She has written for The Washington Post, The New York Times, The Daily Beast, Business Insider, and The Daily Mail, and has since left legacy media for independent, alternative media. In 2023, she published a book called Extremely Online: The Untold Story of Fame, Influence, and Power on the Internet. In 2024, Lorenz left The Washington Post after posting an image on Instagram labeling then-U.S. president Joe Biden as a "war criminal", which sparked an internal investigation. She then began a newsletter, User Mag, and a podcast, Power User. Lorenz has been a frequent target of online harassment. In 2025, she garnered criticism after describing the killing of Brian Thompson by Luigi Mangione as a moral good.

== Early life and education ==
Lorenz grew up in Old Greenwich, Connecticut, and attended Greenwich High School. She attended college at the University of Colorado Boulder and later transferred to Hobart and William Smith Colleges, where she graduated with a degree in political science in 2007. While attending Colorado, Lorenz was a member of the Alpha Phi sorority. She has said the social media site Tumblr caused her to become interested in Internet culture.

== Career ==
According to The Caret, Lorenz's reporting frequently concerns "Silicon Valley venture capitalists, marketers and ... anyone curious about how the internet is shaping the ways in which humans express themselves and communicate". Fortune named her to its "40 Under 40" list in 2020, saying that she had "cemented herself as a peerless authority" whose name became "synonymous with youth culture online" during her time at The Daily Beast and The Atlantic. The same year, Adweek included her on its list of "Young Influentials Who Are Shaping Media, Marketing and Tech", saying that she "contextualizes the internet as we live it". Reason magazine credited her with popularizing the term "OK boomer" in a story declaring "the end of friendly generational relations".

Lorenz worked as a social media editor for the Daily Mail from 2011 to 2014, becoming its head of social media. After a short stint writing for The Daily Dot in 2014, she was a technology reporter for Business Insider from 2014 to 2017. In 2017, she wrote briefly for The Hill's blog section, and was assaulted by a counter-protester while covering the Unite the Right rally in Charlottesville, Virginia. From 2017 to 2018, she worked as a technology reporter for The Daily Beast. In 2019, she was a visiting fellow at Harvard University's Nieman Foundation for Journalism, where she studied how Gen Z interacts with news on Instagram.

=== 2019–2022: The New York Times ===
From 2019 to 2022, Lorenz was a technology reporter for The New York Times. According to TheWrap, "since her time at the Times, she's attracted an inordinate amount of online criticism, particularly from those in the right-wing media". While at the Times, she broke the story that the Bloomberg 2020 presidential campaign was paying Instagram meme accounts to post ads in the form of fake direct messages.

In 2021, Lorenz posted on social media in support of International Women's Day and discussed online harassment she had faced while urging others to support women going through similar experiences. Subsequently, Tucker Carlson criticized her on his show in a segment about "powerful people claiming to be powerless", which led to further harassment. In the First Amendment Law Review, Lili Levi wrote, "this kind of publicity is effectively a call to arms for further harassment by members of Carlson's audience." The New York Times and the International Women's Media Foundation issued statements in support of Lorenz that condemned Carlson's actions. The Times wrote "Lorenz is a talented New York Times journalist doing timely and essential reporting. Journalists should be able to do their jobs without facing harassment", and called Carlson's actions a "cruel and calculated tactic". Fox News and Carlson released statements defending Carlson's criticism of Lorenz, with Fox News writing, "No public figure or journalist is immune to legitimate criticism of their reporting, claims or journalistic tactics."

=== 2022–2024: The Washington Post ===
In March 2022, Lorenz left the Times and joined The Washington Post as a technology and online culture columnist. In April 2022, she wrote an article for the Post that publicized the identity of Chaya Raichik as the owner of the far-right Twitter account Libs of TikTok. The details were retrieved from early iterations of the account, as well as previous reporting. Raichik argued that Lorenz had doxxed her. Lorenz countered that Raichik's identity had already been publicly available. According to The Times of London, "supporters of Lorenz meanwhile pointed out that Raichik's followers were only too enthusiastic about doxing when it came to teachers being smeared as paedophiles". In a tweet, Lorenz said that her "whole family was doxed again this morning [...] trolls have now moved on to doxing and stalking any random friends I've tagged on Instagram". Lorenz later interviewed Raichik for an article in February 2024.

In May 2022, Lorenz published a report in the Post about the Joe Biden administration "pausing" the newly created Disinformation Governance Board within the Department of Homeland Security. Lorenz described a campaign of online harassment and highly critical coverage from right-wing media outlets toward the board's director, Nina Jankowicz, who resigned from the post shortly afterward. In the article, Lorenz argued that Jankowicz had been "set up to fail" by the administration, describing how Jankowicz had become the victim of attacks by online right-wing influencers and conservative media personalities, including threats of physical violence.

In June 2022, the Post published an article by Lorenz about online influencers covering the Depp v. Heard trial. The article said two YouTubers mentioned in the article were contacted for comment, but the Post later issued a correction saying only one had been contacted. The YouTuber said the request for comment only came after the article was published. In a Twitter thread reviewed by Lorenz's editors and management of the Post, Lorenz said the error was due to a miscommunication with her editor.

In December 2022, Twitter owner Elon Musk temporarily suspended Lorenz's Twitter account, tweeting that the suspension was for "prior doxxing action". Lorenz said she was suspended after asking Musk for comment on a story. The suspension followed a series of suspensions of journalists under Musk's new ownership of Twitter.

In coverage of the 2024 Democratic National Convention, Lorenz highlighted social media influencers credentialed by the DNC.

In August 2024, the Post began an internal investigation for evidence of bias after Lorenz shared an image on a private Instagram story depicting President Joe Biden with the caption "war criminal :(", a phrase criticizing United States support for Israel in the Gaza war that had previously been applied to Barack Obama. Lorenz initially denied making the post, and later said that a friend created the captioned picture, which Lorenz shared. According to NPR, four people with direct knowledge of the post confirmed its authenticity. Lorenz never published another article for The Post, which did not announce any findings of its investigation. In October 2024, she announced she was leaving the Post to start a newsletter on Substack. Lorenz told The New Yorker that her decision to leave the Post was not a direct result of the incident and that "every single President that I've ever seen in my lifetime is a war criminal".

=== 2024–present: User Mag ===
In October 2024, Lorenz announced she was leaving The Washington Post to run a Substack publication called "User Mag". Substack co-founder Hamish McKenzie told The Hollywood Reporter that she is an "accomplished reporter with deep experience covering internet trends and culture" whom the platform thinks "will thrive [...] with the direct support of her audience."

In 2025, it was announced that Lorenz would contribute a column to Mehdi Hasan's Zeteo on the influence of Silicon Valley tech billionaires.

Lorenz drew criticism, particularly from conservative politicians, for saying during an April 2025 CNN interview about the killing of health insurance CEO Brian Thompson that his alleged killer, Luigi Mangione, was "morally good". She later said, "To see these millionaire media pundits on TV clutching their pearls about someone stanning a murderer when this is the United States of America, as if we don't lionize criminals [and] stan murderers of all sorts, and we can give them Netflix shows".

=== Other works ===
In October 2023, her book Extremely Online: The Untold Story of Fame, Influence, and Power on the Internet was published by Simon & Schuster. The book focuses on various aspects of internet culture, including mommy blogs, YouTube, and Vine. Lorenz discusses how influencers struggle to monetize their content and how prominent women such as Julia Allison are often targets of online harassment and misogyny.

In February 2024, it was announced that Lorenz would launch a podcast called Power User in partnership with Vox Media. In December 2024, Semafor reported that her distribution partnership would not be renewed, a claim Lorenz denied, saying she retains full ownership of the show and is continuing to publish episodes independently.

== As a target of harassment ==
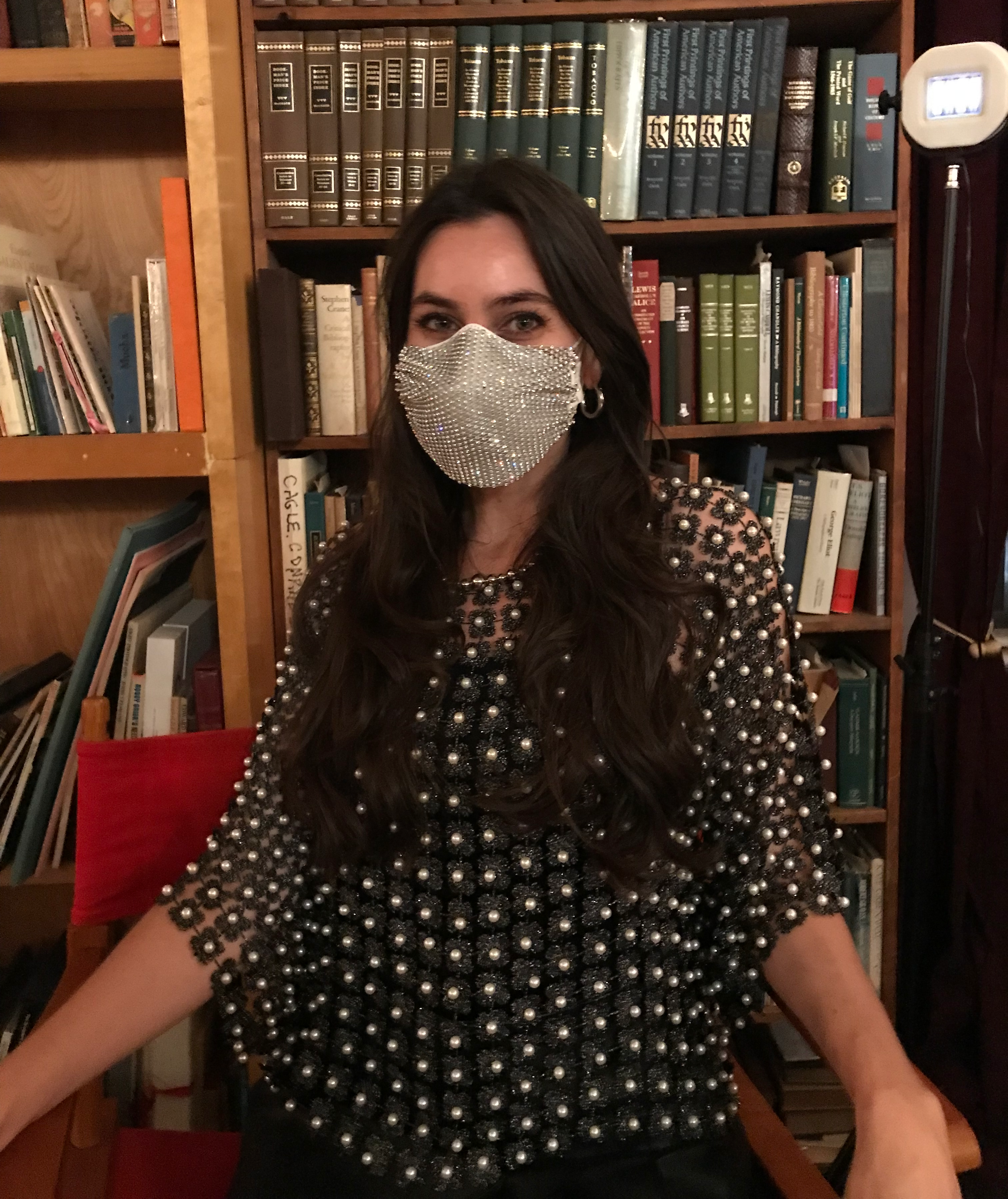
Lorenz regularly wears a facial mask in public, citing a compromised immune system.

Lorenz has been the subject of online harassment, which multiple sources have described as coordinated or orchestrated. According to the International Center for Journalists, such harassment often escalates after signals from political figures or media personalities. Commentators like Nina Jankowicz have characterized the abuse as indirectly incited by critical media coverage rather than explicit calls to action.

Much of the harassment has originated from right-wing online spaces. The Independent wrote, "Lorenz is a regular target of attacks from the right online, with comments she makes frequently blowing up and feeding an arguably disingenuous outrage culture, so much so that she has been called 'the most harassed technology journalist in America' and her career recommended for study to fellow reporters". Lorenz has said the abuse included graphic threats, doxing, stalking, and swatting, affecting both her and her family. Reports have highlighted that the tactics used against her reflect broader misogynistic patterns, both online and offline.

== Personal life ==
Lorenz described herself in interviews as vegan until 2021, later saying she had added chicken and fish to her diet for health reasons. She said she was immunocompromised in an interview with the Society of Professional Journalists' magazine Quill.

== Selected publications ==
- Lorenz, Taylor (October 3, 2023). Extremely Online: The Untold Story of Fame, Influence, and Power on the Internet. Simon & Schuster. ISBN 978-0-7535-6079-2.
