= Alejandro Mayorkas =

American government official (born 1959)

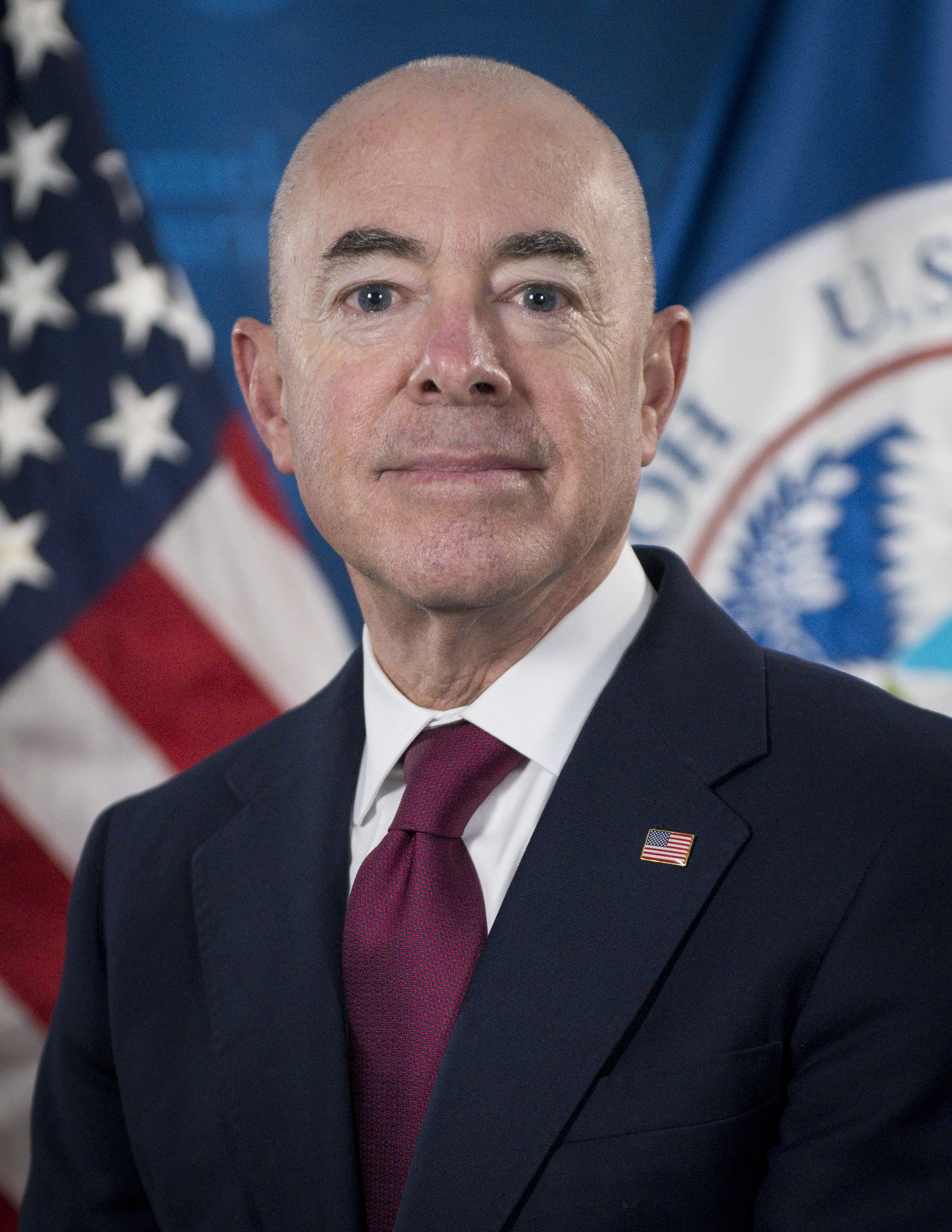
- Official portrait, 2021

7th United States Secretary of Homeland Security
- In office February 2, 2021 – January 20, 2025
- President: Joe Biden
- Deputy: John Tien; Kristie Canegallo (acting)
- Preceded by: Kirstjen Nielsen
- Succeeded by: Kristi Noem

6th United States Deputy Secretary of Homeland Security
- In office December 23, 2013 – October 28, 2016
- President: Barack Obama
- Preceded by: Jane Holl Lute
- Succeeded by: Elaine Duke

Director of United States Citizenship and Immigration Services
- In office August 12, 2009 – December 23, 2013
- President: Barack Obama
- Preceded by: Jonathan Scharfen (acting)
- Succeeded by: Lori Scialabba (acting)

United States Attorney for the Central District of California
- In office December 21, 1998 – April 20, 2001
- President: Bill Clinton; George W. Bush
- Preceded by: Nora Margaret Manella
- Succeeded by: Debra Wong Yang

Personal details
- Born: Alejandro Nicholas Mayorkas; November 24, 1959 (age 66) Havana, Cuba
- Party: Democratic
- Spouse: Tanya Mayorkas
- Children: 2
- Education: University of California, Berkeley (BA); Loyola Marymount University (JD)
- Mayorkas's voice Mayorkas answering questions about vetting Afghan refugees. Recorded November 16, 2021

Alejandro Nicholas Mayorkas (born November 24, 1959) is an American attorney and government official who was the seventh United States Secretary of Homeland Security, serving from 2021 until 2025. A member of the Democratic Party, Mayorkas previously served as the director of United States Citizenship and Immigration Services from 2009 to 2013, and the sixth deputy secretary of homeland security from 2013 to 2016.

Mayorkas was born in Havana, Cuba. Shortly after the Cuban Revolution, his family fled to Florida and later settled in California. He graduated from UC Berkeley in history with honors, subsequently earning his J.D. from Loyola Marymount University. After law school, Mayorkas worked as an assistant United States attorney and as the United States attorney for the Central District of California in Los Angeles from 1998 to 2001. In 2009, Mayorkas was a member of the presidential transition team for Barack Obama, leading the team responsible for the U.S. Department of Justice's Criminal Division. He was appointed by President Obama as the director of U.S. Citizenship and Immigration Services. As USCIS director, Mayorkas implemented the Deferred Action for Childhood Arrivals (DACA) process in 60 days. He led U.S. government efforts to rescue orphaned children following the January 2010 earthquake in Haiti, and led the advancement of a crime victims unit that, for the first time, made it possible for the agency to issue the statutory maximum number of visas to victims of crime.

On November 23, 2020, Mayorkas was nominated by President-elect Joe Biden for the position of secretary of homeland security. Mayorkas's nomination received the endorsement of the Fraternal Order of Police and several former secretaries. He was confirmed by the Senate on a 56–43 vote on February 2, 2021, facing significant Republican opposition over his stance on immigration, particularly his support for halting border wall construction and advocating for a pathway to citizenship for illegal immigrants. He was sworn in by Vice President Kamala Harris the same day.

During Mayorkas's tenure as Secretary of Homeland Security, U.S. Customs and Border Protection reported about 10 million nationwide encounters with removable noncitizens across the country. This includes a record 2.2 million encounters at the U.S.-Mexico border in fiscal year 2022, the highest in history. Additionally, 1.5 million "gotaways"—people who evaded capture—were estimated to have entered the U.S. during this period.

Republicans sharply criticized Mayorkas' policies and tenure, leading to his impeachment for dereliction of duty in a narrow and largely partisan 214–213 vote by the House of Representatives in 2024. This came after an unsuccessful impeachment vote of Mayorkas one week prior. Mayorkas is the first cabinet member to be impeached since William Belknap in 1876. The Senate voted 51–49 to dismiss the impeachment charges on April 17, ending the impeachment without a trial.

== Early life and education ==
Alejandro Nicholas Mayorkas was born in Havana, Cuba, on November 24, 1959. When he was one year old, his parents fled with him and his sister to the United States in 1960 as refugees, following the Cuban Revolution. He lived in Miami, Florida, before his family moved to Los Angeles, California, where he was raised for the remainder of his youth. Mayorkas grew up in Beverly Hills and attended Beverly Hills High School.

His father, Charles R. "Nicky" Mayorkas, was born in Cuba. He was a Cuban Jew of Sephardi (from the former Ottoman Empire, present-day Turkey and Greece) and Ashkenazi (from Poland) background. He owned and operated a steel wool factory on the outskirts of Havana. Nicky Mayorkas studied economics at Dartmouth College.

His mother, Anita (Gabor), was a Romanian Jew whose family escaped the Holocaust and fled to Cuba in the 1940s before leaving for the United States after the Cuban Revolution.

Mayorkas graduated from the University of California, Berkeley in 1981 with a Bachelor of Arts degree with distinction. He received his Juris Doctor in 1985 from Loyola Law School, where he was an editor of the Loyola of Los Angeles Entertainment Law Review.

== Assistant United States Attorney ==
After three years as a litigation associate in private practice, Mayorkas became an Assistant United States Attorney in the Central District of California in 1989. He prosecuted a wide array of federal crimes, developing a specialization in the prosecution of white-collar crime, including tax evasion and money laundering. His prosecutions included the successful prosecution of Operation PolarCap, then the largest money laundering case in the nation; the conviction at trial of Heidi Fleiss on charges of federal conspiracy, tax fraud, and money laundering charges; the successful prosecutions of two largest telemarketing fraud operations that preyed on the elderly; and the successful prosecution of a health care fraud and insurance fraud conspiracy.

Mayorkas served as the coordinator of the Southern California Telemarketing Fraud Task Force, overseeing the coordination of federal, state, and local law enforcement and regulatory agencies to combat telemarketing fraud aggressively throughout the Central District of California.

From 1996 to 1998, Mayorkas served as Chief of the Office's General Crimes Section, overseeing the training and trial work of all new Assistant United States Attorneys in the Criminal Division. He received numerous awards from federal law enforcement agencies, including from FBI Director Louis Freeh for the successful prosecution of Operation PolarCap.

== United States Attorney ==
In 1998, Mayorkas was recommended by Senator Dianne Feinstein and appointed by President Bill Clinton as the United States Attorney for the Central District of California, becoming the country's youngest United States Attorney. He was appointed on December 21, 1998.

Mayorkas oversaw the prosecution of high-profile criminal cases, including the prosecution of the Mexican Mafia in death penalty proceedings, the prosecution of Buford O. Furrow Jr. for the murder of a federal postal worker and the hate-motivated shooting of children in a community center, the prosecution of Litton Industries for the payment of bribes abroad, and the takedown of the violent 18th Street gang using RICO statutes.

In late 2000, Mayorkas was one of many California officials who participated in efforts to obtain executive clemency for narcotics trafficker Carlos Vignali Jr., the son of a wealthy Los Angeles businessman. On his last day in office in January 2001, Clinton commuted Vignali's 15-year prison sentence, a controversial decision.

== Private law practice ==
In September 2001, Mayorkas joined O'Melveny & Myers as a litigation partner. In 2008, The National Law Journal named Mayorkas one of the "50 Most Influential Minority Lawyers in America".

Upon the election of Barack Obama in November 2008, Mayorkas was selected by the president-elect for a role in the presidential transition leading up to the inauguration. He led the transition team responsible for the U.S. Department of Justice's Criminal Division.

== Obama administration, 2009–2016 ==
=== Director of U.S. Citizenship and Immigration Services ===
In 2009, Mayorkas was appointed by President Obama as the director of U.S. Citizenship and Immigration Services (USCIS). On May 20, 2009, the nomination was received by the Senate; on August 7, 2009, the nomination was confirmed by the Senate by voice vote. As USCIS director, Mayorkas led United States citizenship through management efficiencies and fiscal responsibility, and safeguarding the integrity of the immigration system. He implemented the Deferred Action for Childhood Arrivals (DACA) process in sixty days. He led U.S. government efforts to rescue orphaned children following the January 2010 earthquake in Haiti and led the advancement of a crime victims unit that, for the first time, resulted in the ability of the agency to administer the statutory maximum number of visas to victims of crime.

For his work as director of USCIS, Mayorkas received awards from the Illinois Coalition for Immigrant and Refugee Rights, the Coalition for Humane Immigrant Rights of Los Angeles, and the Mexican American Legal Defense and Education Fund.

In 2015, a Department of Homeland Security Office of Inspector General (OIG) report criticized Mayorkas's oversight of the EB-5 investor visa program, which offered lawful permanent resident status (green cards) to foreign investors who invested $500,000 into businesses that created jobs in the U.S. The program's popularity greatly increased under Mayorkas's tenure. The OIG report, which was the culmination of an investigation beginning in 2013, focused on allegations that politically connected businesses were given special treatment under the program, focusing specifically on the Sahara casino and hotel in Las Vegas, backed by then-Senate Majority Leader Harry Reid, and an electric car company led by Terry McAuliffe and involving Anthony Rodham. The report concluded that "The juxtaposition of Mr. Mayorkas' communication with external stakeholders on specific matters outside the normal procedures, coupled with favorable action that deviated from the regulatory scheme designed to ensure fairness and evenhandedness in adjudicating benefits, created an appearance of favoritism and special access." The "fast-tracking" of approvals for individuals involved in the casino program was controversial because it was made over the objections of USCIS analysts "who were suspicious about the source of the funds".

=== Deputy Secretary of Homeland Security ===
Nominated by President Obama in June 2013, Mayorkas was confirmed as the deputy secretary on December 20, 2013, following a party-line Senate vote. Mayorkas' confirmation made him the first foreign-born person ever to run the department.

The investigation by the OIG into Alejandro Mayorkas's actions as USCIS director—specifically, his intervention to expedite reviews for foreign investor visa applicants in three cases—sparked controversy and delayed his confirmation proceedings. The inspector general's report found that Mayorkas's acts did not violate the law, but did create an appearance of favoritism. In House Homeland Security Committee testimony in May 2015, Mayorkas expressed regret that his intervention created an impression of favoritism, but said his involvement was motivated by a desire to ensure that the applications were handled in accordance with the law: "I did not let errors go unchecked, but instead helped ensure that those cases were decided correctly, nothing more and nothing less."

As deputy secretary, Mayorkas's led DHS's response to the 2013–14 Ebola virus epidemic and 2015–16 Zika virus epidemic. His work also focused on cybersecurity. He led the DHS's negotiations with Israel and China on cybersecurity. A landmark agreement reached in 2015 with the Chinese government reduced, for a brief period, Chinese cyberattacks against American companies aimed at the theft of intellectual property. After the normalization of U.S.-Cuba relations, Mayorkas led the Obama administration's delegation to Cuba in 2015, and negotiated with the Cuban government on port and cargo security and U.S.-Cuba travel.

Mayorkas was also involved in the Department's counterterrorism and anti-cybercrime efforts, as well as its public-private partnerships, and efforts to fight antisemitism. Under Mayorkas's tenure, DHS greatly expanded its Cyber Crimes Center in Fairfax, Virginia, to aid the department's efforts to combat various cybercrimes, ranging from child exploitation to computer hacking and intellectual property theft. Mayorkas was involved in efforts to address DHS's presence on GAO's "high risk list" for management challenges; Mayorkas, as well as Homeland Security Secretary Jeh Johnson, acknowledged low morale among DHS employees (a longstanding problem that pre-dated the Obama administration) and took steps aimed at boosting morale.

== Return to private practice, 2017–2020 ==
In October 2016, Mayorkas joined the law firm of Wilmer Cutler Pickering Hale and Dorr in the firm's Washington office.

== Secretary of Homeland Security (2021–2025) ==
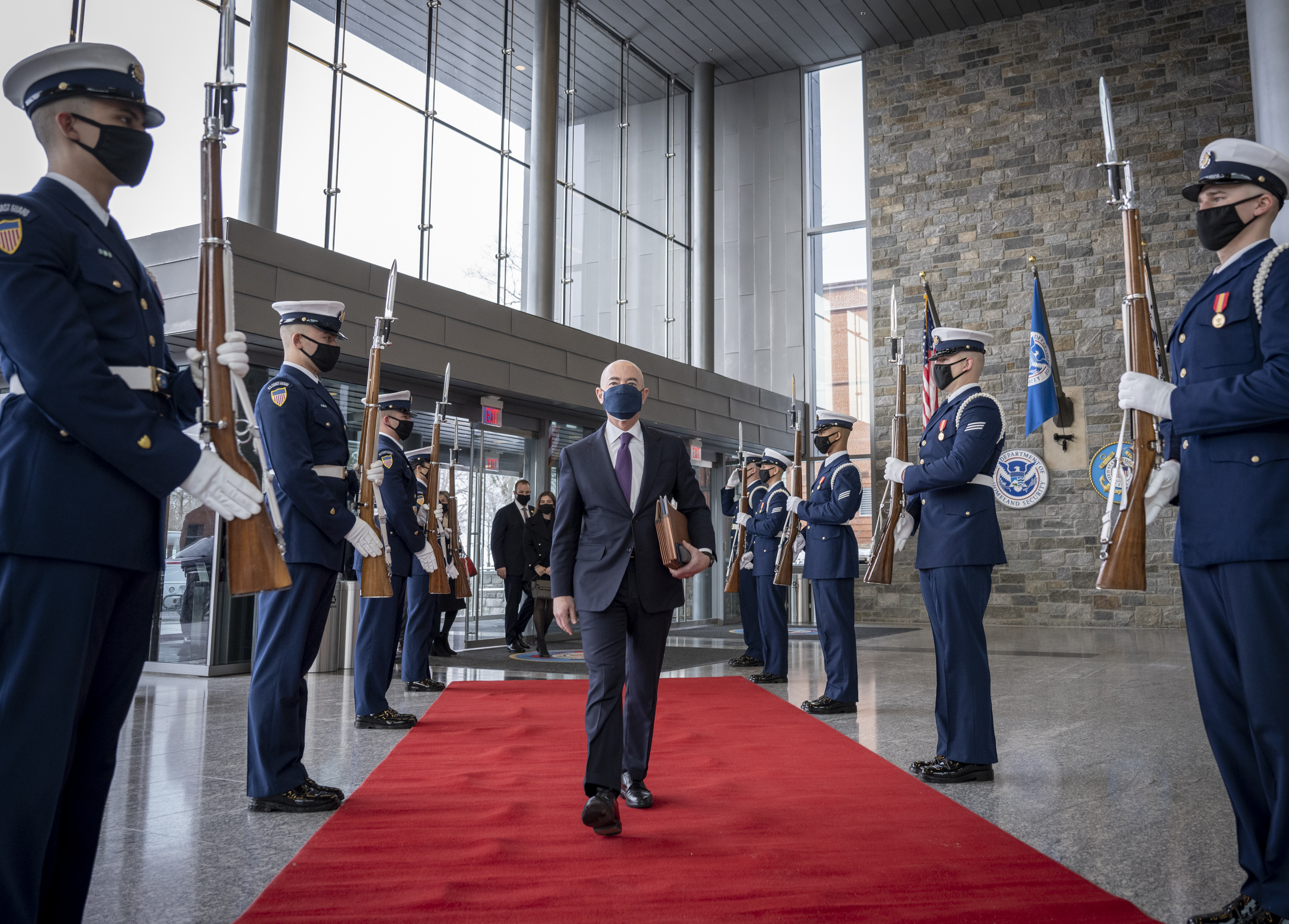
Mayorkas arrives at the DHS headquarters following his swearing-in as secretary, 2021

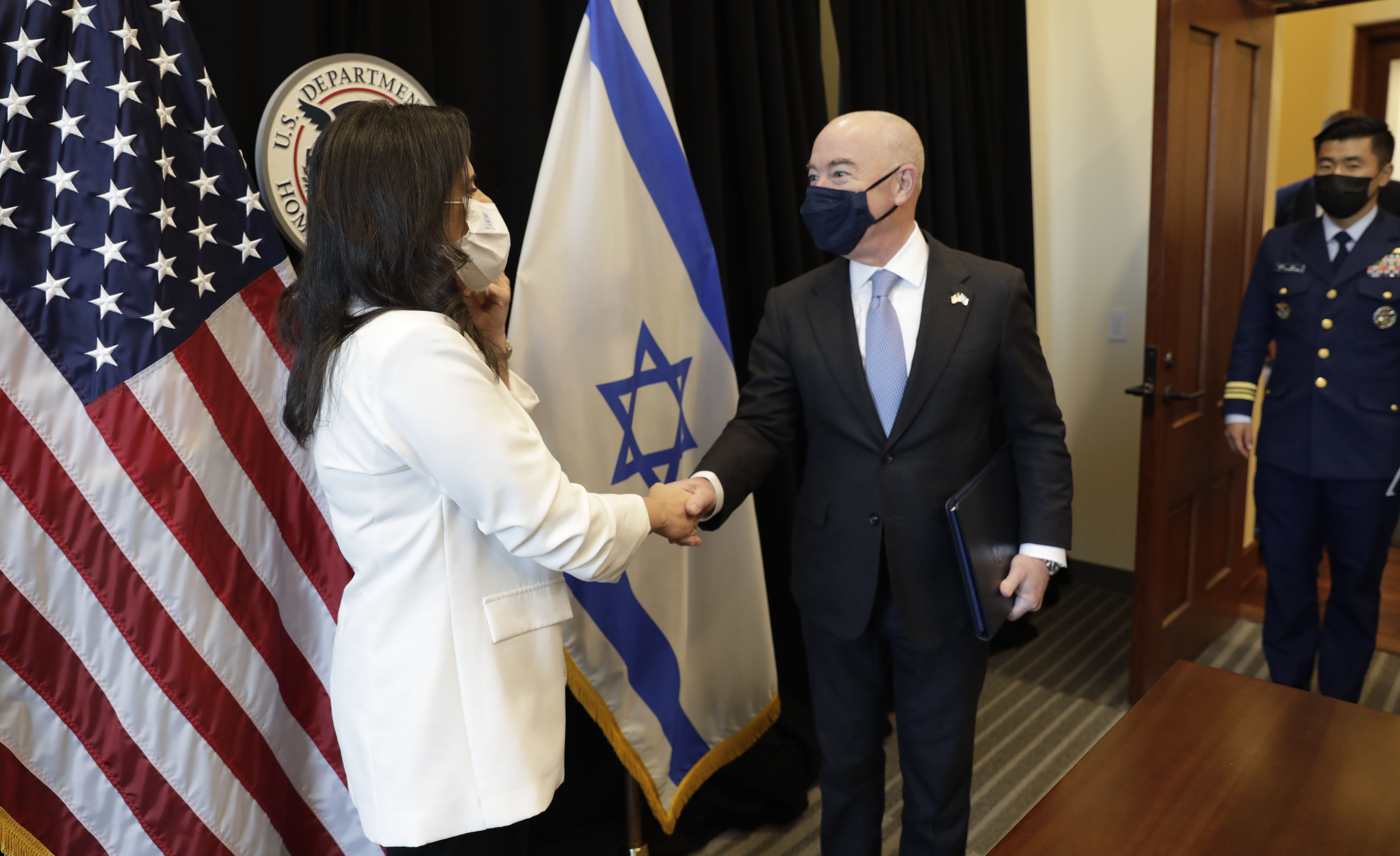
Mayorkas with Israeli Interior Minister Ayelet Shaked in Washington, D.C. on November 17, 2021

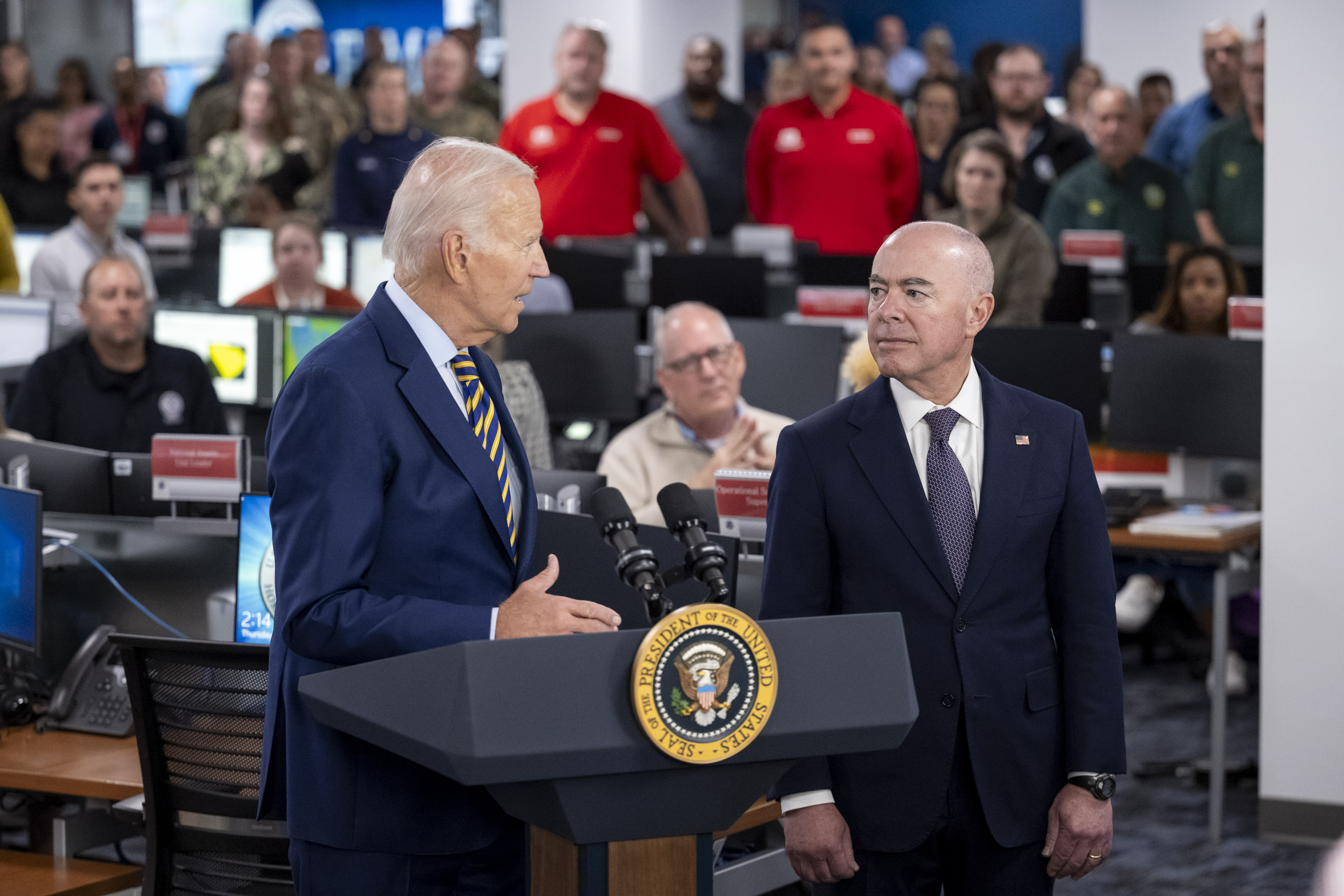
Mayorkas joins US President Joe Biden at FEMA Headquarters, 2023

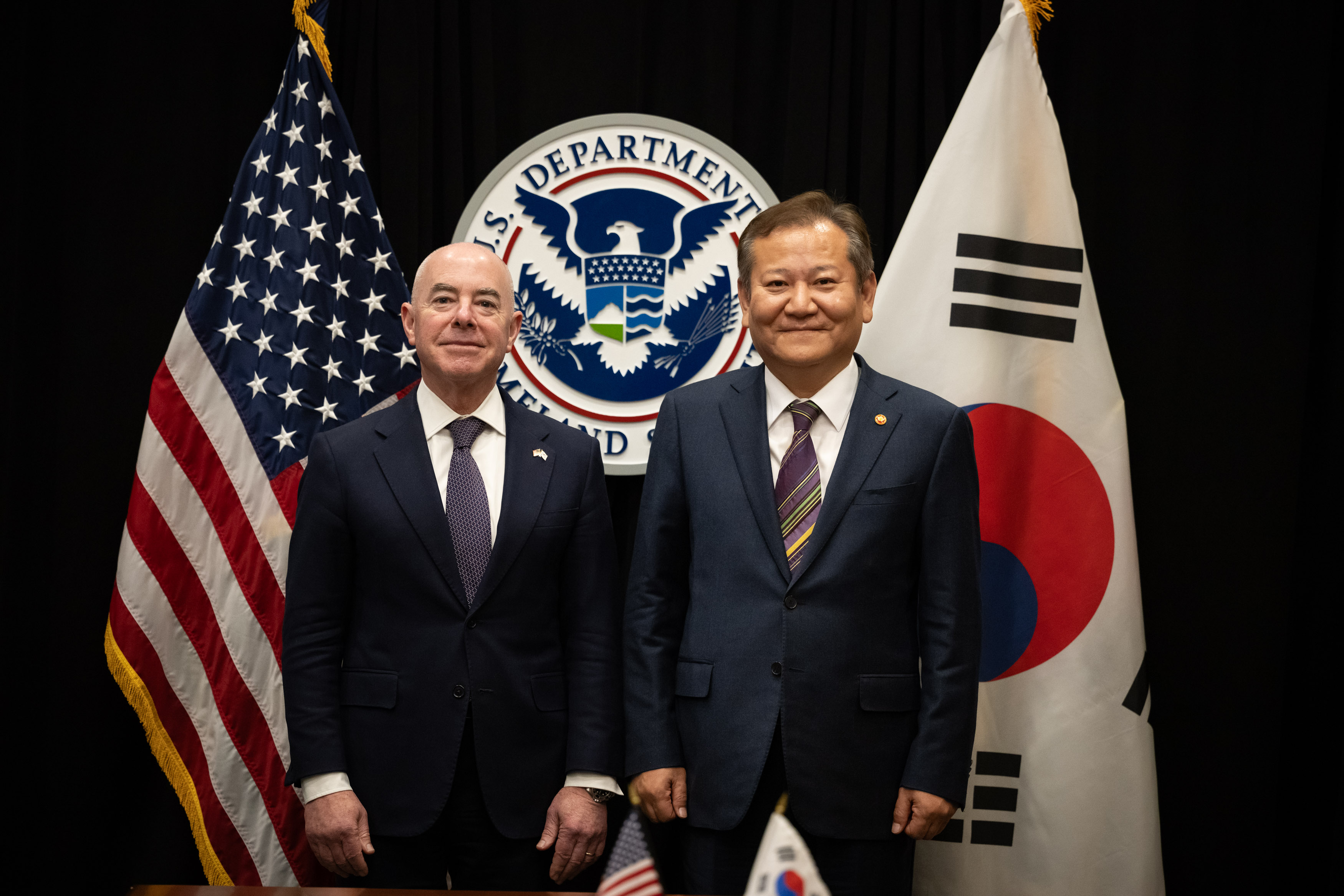
Mayorkas met with Lee Sang-min, Republic of Korea Minister of the Interior and Safety

=== Nomination and confirmation ===
On November 23, 2020, President-elect Joe Biden announced his plan to nominate Mayorkas to be Secretary of Homeland Security. Mayorkas had the support of the Fraternal Order of Police and endorsements from former secretaries Tom Ridge and Michael Chertoff (who served under George W. Bush) and Janet Napolitano and Jeh Johnson (who served under Barack Obama), who said Biden "could not have found a more qualified person". Most Senate Republicans however opposed the nomination; Josh Hawley delayed a speedy confirmation, and Senate Minority Leader Mitch McConnell urged his caucus to vote against confirmation.

Ultimately, Mayorkas was confirmed on a 56–43 vote. Republican Senators Shelley Moore Capito, Rob Portman, Susan Collins, Mitt Romney, Lisa Murkowski, and Dan Sullivan voted with the Democrats to confirm Mayorkas. Mayorkas was sworn in by Vice President Kamala Harris on February 2, 2021, after his confirmation that day. Mayorkas is the first refugee and first person born in Latin America to lead the department.

=== Tenure ===
Early on in his tenure, arrests surged at the Mexico-United States border. In June 2021, the monthly number of intercepted migrants reached a decade high of 188,800.

In May 2021, Mayorkas led the establishment of a task force dedicated to reuniting families separated at the southern border during the Trump administration. By early 2023, approximately 600 children had been reunited with their parents.

On October 19, 2021, Mayorkas tested positive for COVID-19 during a test performed as part of pre-travel protocol. He experienced mild symptoms, forcing him to cancel a trip to Bogotá, Colombia, and to reschedule a Senate hearing.

Testifying to the Homeland Security Subcommittee of the House Committee on Appropriations on April 27, 2022, Mayorkas confirmed that the Biden administration will implement a Disinformation Working Group in the DHS to "develop guidelines, standards, [and] guardrails" to shape the department's longstanding effort to counter disinformation. Three weeks later, after critics called the initiative "a violation of free speech" and its executive director Nina Jankowicz had resigned, the Disinformation Working Group was "paused".

In September 2021, a photo circulated of Border Patrol agents using their "long rein" to control horses; however, the photo appeared to show them "whipping" Haitian migrants. Upon its release, the image generated outrage. Initially, Mayorkas defended the actions of agents, but later, at a White House press conference, condemned their actions and pledged to investigate them.

In October 2022, The Heritage Foundation released emails that showed that, hours before the press conference, Mayorkas received emails that disproved the whipping claim, including from the photographer himself. Republicans condemned Mayorkas upon the emails' release. Senator Ted Cruz, Representatives Andy Biggs, Michael Cloud and Vicky Hartzler had, by October 2022, raised the prospect of impeaching Mayorkas. Chief of the United States Border Patrol under President Obama and acting Commissioner of U.S. Customs and Border Protection under President Trump Mark A. Morgan also condemned Mayorkas's actions.

On October 31, 2023, Mayorkas testified before the Senate Homeland Security Committee that more than 600,000 people illegally made their way into the United States without being apprehended by border agents during the 2023 fiscal year.

On January 17, 2024, a non-binding resolution denouncing the Biden-Harris administration's handling of the U.S. southern border passed the House of Representatives by a vote of 225–187, with 211 Republicans and 14 Democrats supporting it.

From January 2021 through June 2024, U.S. Customs and Border Protection has reported about 10 million nationwide encounters with removable noncitizens across the country. This includes a record 2.2 million encounters at the U.S.-Mexico border in fiscal year 2022, the highest in history. Additionally, 1.5 million "gotaways"—people who evaded capture—were estimated to have entered the U.S. during this period.

On July 25, 2024, the United States House of Representatives voted 220–196 to pass another resolution condemning the Biden-Harris administration for their handling of the U.S. southern border. Six Democrats voted with all Republicans in the House to pass the resolution.

=== Impeachment ===
On November 9, 2023, Representative Marjorie Taylor Greene filed a motion to impeach Mayorkas, citing a dereliction of duty and saying he "failed to maintain operational control of the [Southern] border". The motion to impeach failed to pass on November 13, with the House of Representatives voting 209–201 to defer the resolution to the House Homeland Security Committee. Eight Republicans joined all Democrats in blocking the measure.

On January 28, 2024, House Republicans introduced two articles of impeachment against Mayorkas, alleging "willful and systemic refusal to comply with the law" and breach of the public trust. Constitutional legal scholars and Democrats asserted Republicans were using impeachment to address immigration policy disputes rather than for high crimes and misdemeanors, of which there was no evidence. Legal scholar and law professor Jonathan Turley commented that the impeachment lacked a "cognizable basis" and that the inquiry had failed to show "conduct by the secretary that could be viewed as criminal or impeachable". In a Washington Post opinion piece, Norm Eisen and Joshua Matz argued that an impeachment of Mayorkas on grounds of "maladministration" would violate the Constitution. Former DHS secretary Michael Chertoff, a Republican, wrote in a Wall Street Journal opinion piece that "Republicans in the House should drop this impeachment charade and work with Mr. Mayorkas to deliver for the American people." On the eve of a committee vote on the impeachment articles, the conservative Editorial Board at The Wall Street Journal also questioned the reasoning for impeachment, writing "A policy dispute doesn't qualify as a high crime and misdemeanor."

On January 31, 2024, Republicans on the House Homeland Security Committee approved the articles along party lines for referral to the full House. On February 6, 2024, the House voted against impeaching Mayorkas, nearly along party lines, with the final vote being 214–216. Major media outlets variously characterized the failed vote as a "stunning rebuke", a "calamitous miscalculation", and a "story of a House in utter disarray". On February 13, 2024, the House voted to impeach Mayorkas on a party-line vote of 214–213; three Republicans joined all 210 Democrats in voting no. He was the first federal official to be impeached based solely on policy disagreements, and the first Cabinet secretary to be impeached in 150 years.

On April 17, 2024, the U.S. Senate voted through a point of order that the charges were unconstitutional and moot by a vote of 51–48 on Article I (with Republican senator Lisa Murkowski voting "present") and 51–49 on Article II. Afterwards, the Senate voted, 51–49, to adjourn the trial.

== Personal life ==
Mayorkas and his wife Tanya have two daughters. He is a runner and plays tennis and squash.

== See also ==
- List of Hispanic and Latino American United States Cabinet members
- List of Jewish United States Cabinet members

== Sources ==
- Johnson, Ross (September 2000). "The Enforcer". Los Angeles. 45 (9): 68–80.

Legal offices
Preceded by Nora Margaret Manella	United States Attorney for the Central District of California; 1998–2001	Succeeded by Debra Wong Yang
Political offices
Preceded by Jonathan Scharfen; Acting	Director of United States Citizenship and Immigration Services; 2009–2013	Succeeded by Lori Scialabba; Acting
Preceded by Rafael Borras; Acting	United States Deputy Secretary of Homeland Security; 2013–2016	Succeeded by Russell Deyo; Acting
Preceded by Kirstjen Nielsen	United States Secretary of Homeland Security; 2021–2025	Succeeded by Kristi Noem
U.S. order of precedence (ceremonial)
Preceded by Janet Yellen as Former U.S. Cabinet Member	Order of precedence of the United States as Former U.S. Cabinet Member	Succeeded by Pete Buttigieg as Former U.S. Cabinet Member
