= Nina Jankowicz =

American researcher, author, and commentator

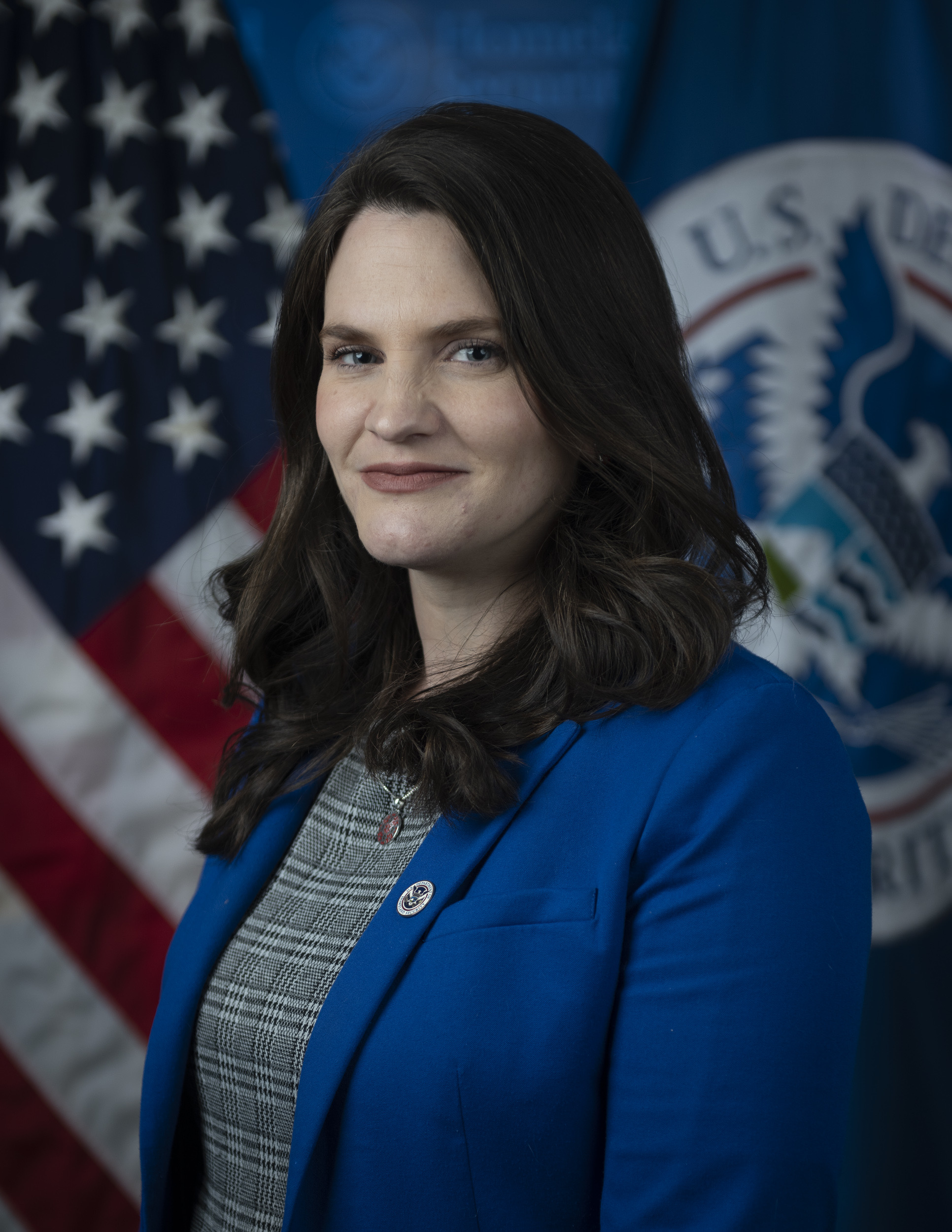
- Official portrait, 2022

Executive Director of the Disinformation Governance Board
- In office March 2, 2022 – May 18, 2022
- President: Joe Biden
- DHS Secretary: Alejandro Mayorkas
- Preceded by: Office established
- Succeeded by: Office abolished

Personal details
- Born: 1988 or 1989 (age 37–38)
- Education: Bryn Mawr College (BA); Georgetown University (MA)

Nina Jankowicz (born 1988 or 1989) is an American researcher and writer. She is the author of How to Lose the Information War (2020), on Russian use of disinformation as geopolitical strategy, and How to Be a Woman Online (2022), a handbook for fighting against online harassment of women.

She briefly served as executive director of the newly created Disinformation Governance Board of the U.S. Department of Homeland Security (DHS), resigning from the position after three weeks in May 2022.

== Career ==
A double-major in Russian and political science, Jankowicz graduated from Bryn Mawr College in 2011 and spent a semester at Herzen State Pedagogical University in Russia in 2010. In 2017, she was a Fulbright fellow in Kyiv, working with the Ministry of Foreign Affairs of Ukraine. She has served as a disinformation fellow at the Woodrow Wilson Center, where she studied the intersection of democracy and technology in Central and Eastern Europe. She also supervised the Russia and Belarus programs at the National Democratic Institute. In 2023, she was named to Time magazine's list of the 100 most influential people in artificial intelligence.

=== Writing ===
Jankowicz's first book, published in 2020, was titled How to Lose the Information War: Russia, Fake News and the Future of Conflict. Jankowicz examines Russian influence operations aimed at weakening democratic nations and thereby strengthening its own standing in international order. This proceeds via six case studies, one per chapter: Estonia, Georgia, Poland, and Ukraine together with the Netherlands, Czech Republic, and the United States. She argues for media literacy, public awareness, and an educated electorate as the best means to guard against a disinformation campaign. In The New Yorker Joshua Yaffa called it "a persuasive new book on disinformation as a geopolitical strategy".

In 2022, Jankowicz published How to be a Woman Online: Surviving Abuse and Harassment, and How to Fight Back. In it, she draws on statistics on online sexism and harassment of women, as well as on her own experience and that of journalist Nicole Perlroth, Guardian columnist Van Badham, and video game designer Brianna Wu. It is organized in five sections, dealing with online security, handling trolls, developing supportive communities, navigating social media, and repelling online harassment. A review in Publishers Weekly called it "strategic, focused, and eminently usable ... an essential guide for women interested in standing up for a fairer, safer online world". Writing in The Diplomatic Courier, Joshua Huminski said that in addition to its usefulness as a how-to guide, reading about the experiences the book sets out to address also serves a second purpose: "forcing the reader to confront these very real and very uncomfortable questions" of why women face a "torrent of online abuse directed at them for the crime of ... having their gender". Kirkus Reviews said that it "feels more like a long-form blog post than a book, and the text contains too much repetition," but praised its "forthright, sometimes blisteringly witty tone".

Jankowicz has also contributed to The Washington Post and The New York Times.

=== Disinformation Governance Board ===
In April 2022, Jankowicz' selection to head the newly formed Disinformation Governance Board of the United States Department of Homeland Security (DHS) was announced. Her appointment drew criticism from congressional Republicans along with right-wing media outlets and influencers.

Republicans expressed concerns that the board could be weaponized by Democrats against conservatives. Despite concerns that it would be used to censor political speech, the board had only an advisory role and no enforcement ability. Conservative pundits and social media users spread misleaning claims about Jankowicz and conspiracy theories about the board's purpose, including the false claim that Jankowicz planned to edit Twitter posts by ordinary users. Fox News, along with Republican politicians and influencers, labeled the board a "ministry of truth", a reference to George Orwell's dystopian novel 1984. Jankowicz was subjected to online abuse and harassment, including rape and death threats and other sexist messages. She said she received hundreds of violent threats against her and her family.

Republicans took issue with Jankowicz's past social media comments expressing support for Democrats, praising efforts to crack down on COVID-19 misinformation, questioning the origin of the Hunter Biden laptop controversy, and debating the origins of the Christopher Steele dossier. Jankowicz had suggested in 2020 that Hunter Biden's laptop could be part of a Russian disinformation campaign and should be regarded as a "Trump campaign product". A group of former senior intelligence officials had also called the laptop "deeply suspicious".

Critics accused Jankowicz of being hostile to conservative views, suggesting without evidence that she would censor protected speech. Republicans cited Jankowicz's comments about Elon Musk's then-standing offer to purchase Twitter as evidence of anti-conservative bias. Republican congressmen Jim Jordan and Josh Hawley accused Jankowicz of spreading misinformation. She later said that critics had taken her remarks out of context.

On CNN's State of The Union, U.S. Homeland Security Secretary Alejandro Mayorkas called Jankowicz "eminently qualified, a renowned expert in the field of disinformation". Progressive media watchdog Fairness & Accuracy in Reporting criticized mainstream media for focusing on right-wing criticism without considering potential left-wing objections to Jankowicz's appointment.

In May 2022, the Disinformation Governance Board and its working groups were "paused" pending review, after which Jankowicz resigned from the board. A DHS spokesperson told The Washington Post that "Nina Jankowicz has been subjected to unjustified and vile personal attacks and physical threats". Writing in the Post, journalist Taylor Lorenz cited failures by DHS to communicate with relevant congressional entities, to respond to criticism of the board's name and its unclear mission, and to defend Jankowicz against right-wing criticism. In August 2022, DHS Secretary Mayorkas disbanded the board.

Jankowicz appeared on CNN's Reliable Sources, during which she described the board as a "victim of disinformation", saying its purpose had been misrepresented by Republicans and the far left, and that she herself had been the subject of disproportionate media attention. Jankowicz said she was opposed to censorship and had worked against it in Russia, Belarus and Ukraine. She said she declined an offer of continued employment with the Biden administration, because of the administration's lack of response to criticism of her and the board.

In March 2023, Jankowicz was subpoenaed by the House Judiciary Select Subcommittee on the Weaponization of the Federal Government, chaired by Jordan, to answer questions about the disinformation board. When she was 8 months pregnant, she was advised by a private security consultant to leave her home for her own safety.

Also in 2023, Jankowicz sued Fox News for defamation over their coverage of her and her role on the board, alleging that Fox's "verifiable falsehoods" damaged her reputation and resulted in harassment and death threats. A federal judge dismissed the lawsuit in July 2024, finding that 36 of the 37 alleged defamatory statements were about the Disinformation Governance Board rather than Jankowicz. The remaining issue was a statement by Sean Hannity that the Board was a "department ... dedicated to working with the special media giants for the purpose of policing information". The judge ruled that Hannity's description of the Board was "not defamatory" because it was "not false".

In March 2025, Jankowicz testified at a Congressional foreign affairs subcommittee hearing on the alleged "censorship industrial complex" under the Biden Administration. She called the premise of the hearing "a fiction that has not only had profound impacts on my life and safety, but on our national security".

=== Centre for Information Resilience ===
In September 2022, Jankowicz announced the launch of The Hypatia Project, which she conducted at the UK-based Centre for Information Resilience (CIR). The project's stated aim is to combat online disinformation and gendered abuse including deepfake pornography. She was the Vice President at the CIR from September 2022 through April 2024.

=== American Sunlight Project ===
Jankowicz is currently the chief executive of American Sunlight Project, a nonprofit organization that she cofounded in 2024. Its stated mission is "Increasing The Cost Of Lies That Undermine Democracy." It is not related to the Sunlight Foundation, which ceased operations in 2020.

== Personal life ==
Jankowicz has long been involved in community theater. She is a former member of the wizard rock band The Moaning Myrtles.
