= 2021 Haitian migrant whip controversy =

US Border Patrol incident near Texas

In September 2021, an incident occurred involving migrants from Haiti crossing into the United States from Mexico near Del Rio, Texas. President Joe Biden and Vice-President Kamala Harris claimed the migrants were being whipped by horse-mounted US Border Patrol agents. In July 2022, the US Customs and Border Protection concluded after an investigation that no migrants in fact had been whipped.

== Background ==
After multiple earthquakes and hurricanes ravaged their homeland, many Haitians sought and received refugee status in several South American nations. When the Biden Administration relaxed border crossings along the Mexico–US border, upwards of 42,000 Haitians traveled by caravan from Colombia, through Darien Gap into Panama, then northward through Central America, and Mexico to the US border.

At the time, Homeland Security Secretary Alejandro Mayorkas publicly advised the Haitians, "Do not come," adding "The border is not open." In a leaked audio conversation, Mayorkas stated that the immigration crisis had become "unsustainable". As large numbers of Haitian migrants began crossing the border, the Biden Administration threatened to swiftly deport thousands, despite vocal objections from members of the Democratic Party. Eventually, over 15,000 Haitians were living in a migrant camp under the Del Río–Ciudad Acuña International Bridge near Del Rio.

== Event ==
Paul Ratje, a photographer based in Las Cruces, New Mexico, captured images of a horseback-mounted Border Patrol agent trying to control the crowd. The photos created a sensation with many claiming the agent was using a whip on the Haitian migrants. Ratje said "I've never seen them whip anyone." He claimed the agent was merely twirling the horse's rein. Referring to the rein, Ratje said, "He was swinging it. But I didn't see him actually take—whip someone with it."

== Responses ==
Reaction was immediate. MSNBC commentator Joy Reid Tweeted, "This is beyond repulsive. Are these images from 2021 or 1851??" The BBC compared one of Ratie's photos with a historical drawing of an African slave being pulled with a rope and struck with a whip. "I'm pissed," said Congressional Representative Maxine Waters. "And I'm not just unhappy with the Cowboys who were running down Haitians and using their reins to whip them. I'm unhappy with the administration. We are following the Trump policy."

"Human beings should never be treated that way," Vice President Kamala Harris said. "And I'm deeply troubled about it." President Biden said the border agents involved would "pay" for their actions. Secretary Mayorkas announced an investigation into the matter, and Biden's press secretary Jen Psaki, said the President "believes that the footage and photos are horrific. They don't represent who we are as a country. And he was pleased to see the announcement of the investigation."

Within a month, many of the Haitian migrants were released into the interior of the US. Large numbers of Haitians continued to make the dangerous trek.

On July 8, 2022, nearly ten months after the incident, US Customs and Border Protection released a 511 page report concluding there was "no evidence" that the agents "involved in this incident struck, intentionally or otherwise, any migrant with their reins". Officials blamed a "lack of command control and communication" for mounted agents using their horses to block migrants during the September 2021 migrant surge. The report stated that agents acted with the permission of a supervisor who was unable to get guidance from Border Patrol superiors.
