= Disinformation Governance Board =

Board of the United States Department of Homeland Security

Board overview
- Formed: March 2, 2022; 4 years ago
- Dissolved: August 24, 2022; 3 years ago
- Jurisdiction: United States
- Headquarters: DHS Nebraska Avenue Complex, Washington, D.C.
- Parent department: Department of Homeland Security
- Website: dhs.gov/publication/disinformation-governance-board

The Disinformation Governance Board (DGB) was an advisory board of the United States Department of Homeland Security (DHS), established and disbanded in 2022. The board's stated function was to protect national security by disseminating guidance to DHS agencies on combating misinformation, malinformation, and disinformation that threatens the security of the homeland. Specific problem areas mentioned by the DHS included false information propagated by human smugglers encouraging migrants to surge to the Mexico–United States border, as well as Russian-state disinformation on election interference and the 2022 Russian invasion of Ukraine.

Following what the Associated Press called a "bungled rollout" and criticism from Republican lawmakers of what they saw as the board's threat to freedom of speech, the board and its working groups were "paused" pending review, and the board's head Nina Jankowicz resigned in May 2022. In August 2022, Department of Homeland Security Secretary Alejandro Mayorkas disbanded the board.

== Background ==
The Disinformation Governance Board was announced and revealed to the public by the DHS on April 27, 2022, during a 2023 budget hearing before the United States House Appropriations Subcommittee on Homeland Security. The board had begun operating approximately two months prior to the announcement. The DHS had decided to form the board in 2021 after conducting research that recommended creating a group to "review questions of privacy and civil liberty for online content". The Cybersecurity and Infrastructure Security Agency has previously addressed the spread of what they referred to as "mis-, dis-, and malinformation", as well as addressing Russian disinformation as part of their election security efforts in 2020. CISA director Chris Krebs was fired by President Trump in November 2020 for refuting Trump's false claims of election fraud.

After the board was announced, Nina Jankowicz was named executive director. She was previously a fellow at the Wilson Center, advised the Ukrainian Foreign Ministry as part of the Fulbright Public Policy Fellowship, oversaw Russia and Belarus programs at the National Democratic Institute, and wrote the book How to Lose the Information War: Russia, Fake News, and the Future of Conflict. Robert P. Silvers and Jennifer Daskal were also named to hold leadership positions on the board. On May 18, Jankowicz resigned from her role as executive director.

== Function ==
According to DHS officials, the board would serve as an advisory body and help coordinate anti-disinformation efforts throughout the department. Alejandro Mayorkas, the Secretary of Homeland Security, stated that the board would have no operational authority or capability but would collect best practices for dissemination to DHS organizations already tasked with defending against disinformation threats, and asserted the board would not monitor American citizens. John Cohen, the former acting head of the intelligence branch of the DHS, said that the board would study policy questions, best practices, and academic research on disinformation, and then submit guidance to the DHS secretary on how different DHS agencies should conduct analysis of online content.

On May 2, 2022, the DHS released a statement which said that the board would monitor disinformation spread by "foreign states such as Russia, China, and Iran" and "transnational criminal organizations and human smuggling organizations", and disinformation spread during natural disasters (listing as an example misinformation spread about the safety of drinking water during Hurricane Sandy). The DHS added that "The Department is deeply committed to doing all of its work in a way that protects Americans' freedom of speech, civil rights, civil liberties, and privacy."

On May 9, 2022, the DGB announced that it would provide quarterly reports to the United States Congress.

== Reactions ==
The Associated Press noted that the "little credible information about the new Disinformation Governance Board" made it "an instant target for criticism", leading to a "bungled rollout" and "rocky start" for the board. Taylor Lorenz, writing for The Washington Post, described the board as falling victim to "a textbook disinformation campaign" about their mission, citing failures by DHS to communicate with relevant congressional entities, to respond to criticism of the board's name and its unclear mission, and to defend against right-wing criticism of Jankowicz.

Conservatives said the board would be used as a tool by Democrats to restrict freedom of speech. Republican lawmakers and pundits quickly criticized the board after it was announced, with some calling for it to be disbanded. Senator Josh Hawley of Missouri said that "Homeland Security has decided to make policing Americans' speech its top priority". Senator Mitt Romney of Utah called the board a "terrible idea" that "communicates to the world that we're going to be spreading propaganda in our own country", arguing that it should be disbanded. Some critics, including Florida governor Ron DeSantis and former Democratic representative for Hawaii, Tulsi Gabbard, compared the board to the Ministry of Truth, from George Orwell's dystopian novel Nineteen Eighty-Four. A group of Republican state attorneys general led by Jason Miyares of Virginia threatened legal action unless DHS disbanded the board, which Miyares described as "Orwellian". Republican congressmen Mike Turner of Ohio and John Katko of New York wrote that "Given the complete lack of information about this new initiative and the potential serious consequences of a government entity identifying and responding to 'disinformation,' we have serious concerns about the activities of this new Board".

Jankowicz's appointment as head of the board drew criticism from congressional Republicans along with right-wing media outlets and influencers. Conservative pundits and social media users spread conspiracy theories about the board's purpose, including the false claim that Jankowicz planned to edit Twitter posts by ordinary users. Critics took issue with Jankowicz's past social media comments expressing support for Democrats, praising efforts to crack down on COVID-19 misinformation, doubting the origin of the Hunter Biden laptop controversy, debating the origins of the Christopher Steele dossier, and her negative response to the acquisition of Twitter by Elon Musk. Jankowicz had suggested in 2020 that Hunter Biden's laptop could be part of a Russian disinformation campaign; a group of former senior intelligence officials had also called the laptop "deeply suspicious". Jankowicz later said that her remarks had been taken out of context.

Writing for National Review, Jim Geraghty lauded the board's potential to dispel information disseminated by human smugglers on the southern border, as well as monitoring messages from terrorist and extremist groups, but objected to Jankowicz's appointment. Biden's press secretary Jen Psaki defended Jankowicz's appointment to the board, calling her "an expert on online disinformation [...] a person with extensive qualifications".

DHS secretary Alejandro Mayorkas later acknowledged his department could have done a better job of communicating the purpose of the new board, but asserted the Republican criticisms were "precisely the opposite" of what it would do. He stated that the board would have no operational authority or capability and would not monitor American citizens. On May 3, 2022, Mayorkas appeared before the Senate Appropriations Subcommittee on Homeland Security, and responded to criticism the board received from Republican lawmakers. He vowed to work on building greater public trust in the board, and said that "The Department of Homeland Security is not going to be the truth police. That is the farthest thing from the truth. We protect the security of the homeland."

Benjamin Hart, writing for the website Intelligencer, said that "presenting anyone from the government as an arbiter of truth in 2022 — much less defining 'disinformation' in a way that more than 40 percent of the population would agree with — seemed doomed from the get-go." Lev Golinkin, writing in the progressive magazine The Nation, highlighted Jankowicz's previous association with the fact-checking organization StopFake, which Golinkin accused of defending the Ukrainian Azov Battalion and S14 groups, the latter of which is known for its violent attacks against Romani people. Progressive news organizations Common Dreams and Fairness & Accuracy in Reporting (FAIR) criticized mainstream media coverage of the board, saying that it ignored left-wing criticism of the board and past human rights abuses and violence by the DHS and other agencies under the DHS, including violence against immigrants, Muslims, Black Lives Matter protestors, and other activists. Joe Lancaster, editor of the libertarian magazine Reason, called the board a potential threat to freedom of speech, and also highlighted Jankowicz's comments regarding the Biden laptop story. Techdirt argued that "The biggest problem with [the board] is that it is impossible, right now, to even know whether it's a good idea or not, because it is so unclear what this board is intended to do." and that "its name does not inspire confidence." Ayaan Hirsi Ali of UnHerd compared the board to Woodrow Wilson's Sedition Act of 1918, which convicted 877 people who dissented against the U.S. government. Kevin Goldberg, a specialist in the First Amendment at the non-partisan Freedom Forum, said that it was "wrong and concerning" that a government agency with enforcement powers created in response to 9/11 would become involved in decisions surrounding speech. The American Conservative called the board "a cautionary note on how dangerously out of touch Washington is."

Jankowicz appeared on the CNN program Reliable Sources, during which she described the board as a "victim of disinformation", saying its purpose had been misrepresented by Republicans and the far left, and that she herself had been the subject of disproportionate media attention. On August 24, 2022, Mayorkas disbanded the board.

== See also ==
- Center for Countering Disinformation, a Ukrainian government department tasked with monitoring foreign propaganda which threatens Ukrainian sovereignty (see: Disinformation in the Russian invasion of Ukraine)
- Global Engagement Center, a State Department agency tasked with countering foreign propaganda that threatens U.S. national security interests
