= United States Air Force Symbol =

American military emblem

U.S. Air Force Symbol

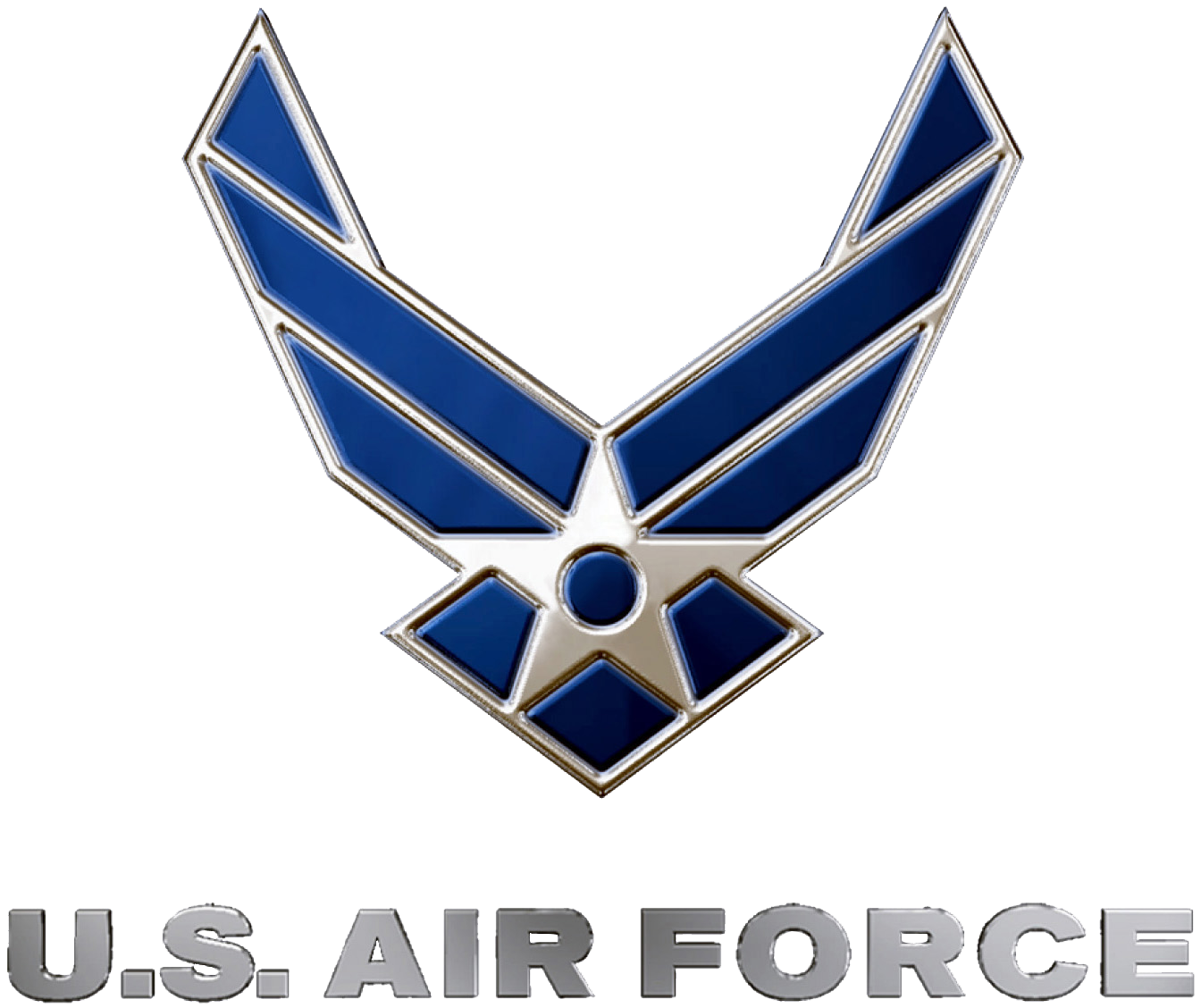
Blue and silver version

Monochrome version

The United States Air Force Symbol is the public logo of the United States Air Force. Unveiled in January 2000 following a period of research and planning, it became official on May 5, 2004, four years after the Air Force first applied for trademark protection.

The Air Force began testing the symbol in 2001 by affixing it to base entry signs, water towers, and some aircraft and vehicles. By 2002, the new symbol had gained "widespread" acceptance within the service, according to a survey of Air Force respondents.

The Air Force symbol is based on the World War II "Hap Arnold Wings," named for General of the Air Force Henry H. "Hap" Arnold. According to the Air Force, the symbol's "modern design" represents the service's "present and future leading edge capabilities defending our nation," and the symbol itself represents the heritage of the service. The Air Force renewed the trademark for the symbol in 2013 and 2024.

== History ==
Following a 1999 recruiting shortfall, the Air Force desired to adopt a new symbol to represent the service for "all internal and external audiences." Research, surveys and focus groups had already been commissioned in 1998. The Air Force hired New York advertising agency Siegel & Gale for "the task of researching and designing the new image, logo, and tagline." Company representatives traveled throughout the Air Force and to major U.S. cities to conduct research and become intimately familiar with the Air Force and its culture, environment, and heritage.

In 2001, the Air Force began testing the emblem, placing it "on a limited number of base entry signs and water towers and a small number of aircraft and vehicles." The symbol was unveiled before its official adoption so that the Air Force could test public opinion prior to making a final decision.

Air Force headquarters released a memo, dated February 10, 2003, addressing the symbol's use on "Base Entry Signs and Water Towers," remarking that the use of the symbol "at base entry gates and on water towers has become widely accepted throughout the Air Force," and stating: "As our installations adopt the new sign criteria, we move closer to our goal of achieving a consistent professional 'first impression.'"

Commenting on the symbol's official adoption in 2004, Air Force Chief of Staff General John P. Jumper said, "I'm proud our symbol is now an official part of our heritage," also remarking: "It represents our storied past and links our 21st Century Air Force to our core values and capabilities." The Air Force also released guidelines on appropriate uses for the new symbol.

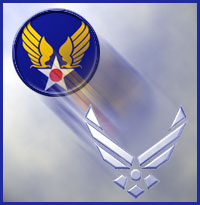
Air Force graphic showing the symbol alongside the Hap Arnold Wings

=== Timeline of the symbol's design and adoption ===
- 1998: Research, surveys and focus groups commissioned
- 1999: Symbol designed
- May 2000: Trademark registration filed
- 2001: Symbol tested throughout Air Force
- 2002: Survey of internal Air Force audience reveals 90% believed the new symbol was already the official Air Force symbol
- September 23, 2003: Trademark registration date. Serial #76040432 and Registration No. 2,767,190
- May 5, 2004: Designated the "Official Symbol of the Air Force"

=== Hap Arnold Wings ===
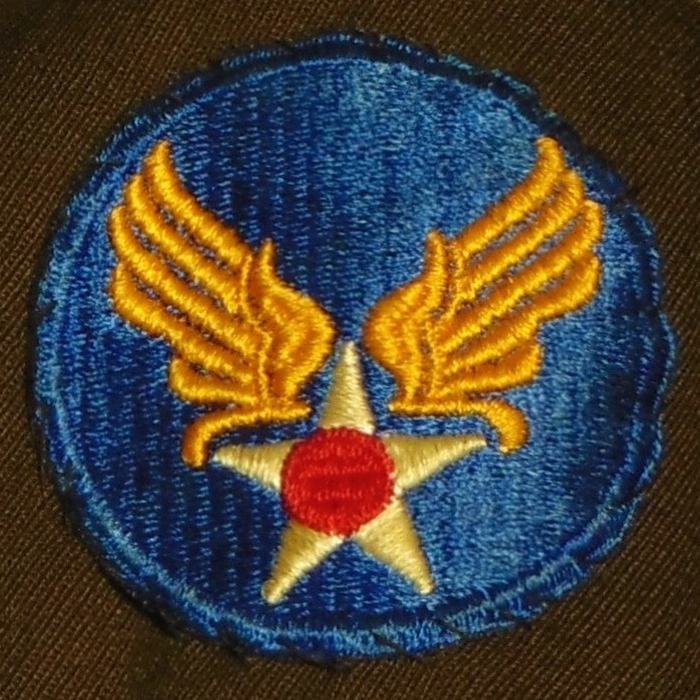
U.S. Army Air Forces shoulder sleeve insignia worn on a 1942 service dress jacket

The original Army Air Forces shoulder sleeve insignia, or "Hap Arnold Wings," was approved on February 23, 1942, and was designed by James T. Rawls, an artist on General Henry H. Arnold's staff. Rawls was inspired to bend the wings upward after seeing a photo of Winston Churchill giving his famous "V for Victory" sign. The insignia was authorized for wear by Army Air Forces (AAF) Regulation 35-11, dated March 21, 1942.

The patch was initially worn by all personnel of the U.S. Army Air Forces, but in March 1943 it was "limited to those AAF personnel not in overseas commands," and in June 1943 it was limited to "Headquarters AAF and a few other independent commands." The ultramarine colored disk represents the sky and air, while the "white star with red disk" is the identifying symbol of U.S. Army and Navy airplanes that was introduced in 1921. The Hap Arnold Wings remain the "legacy brand of the Air Force," and the insignia is also known as the "Army Air Corps symbol" or "Hap Arnold emblem." The design is used today on Air Force uniform buttons and on the Air Force Chief of Staff seal. The "familiar WW II 'Hap' Arnold wings" served as the basis for the new Air Force symbol's design.

== Meaning of design ==
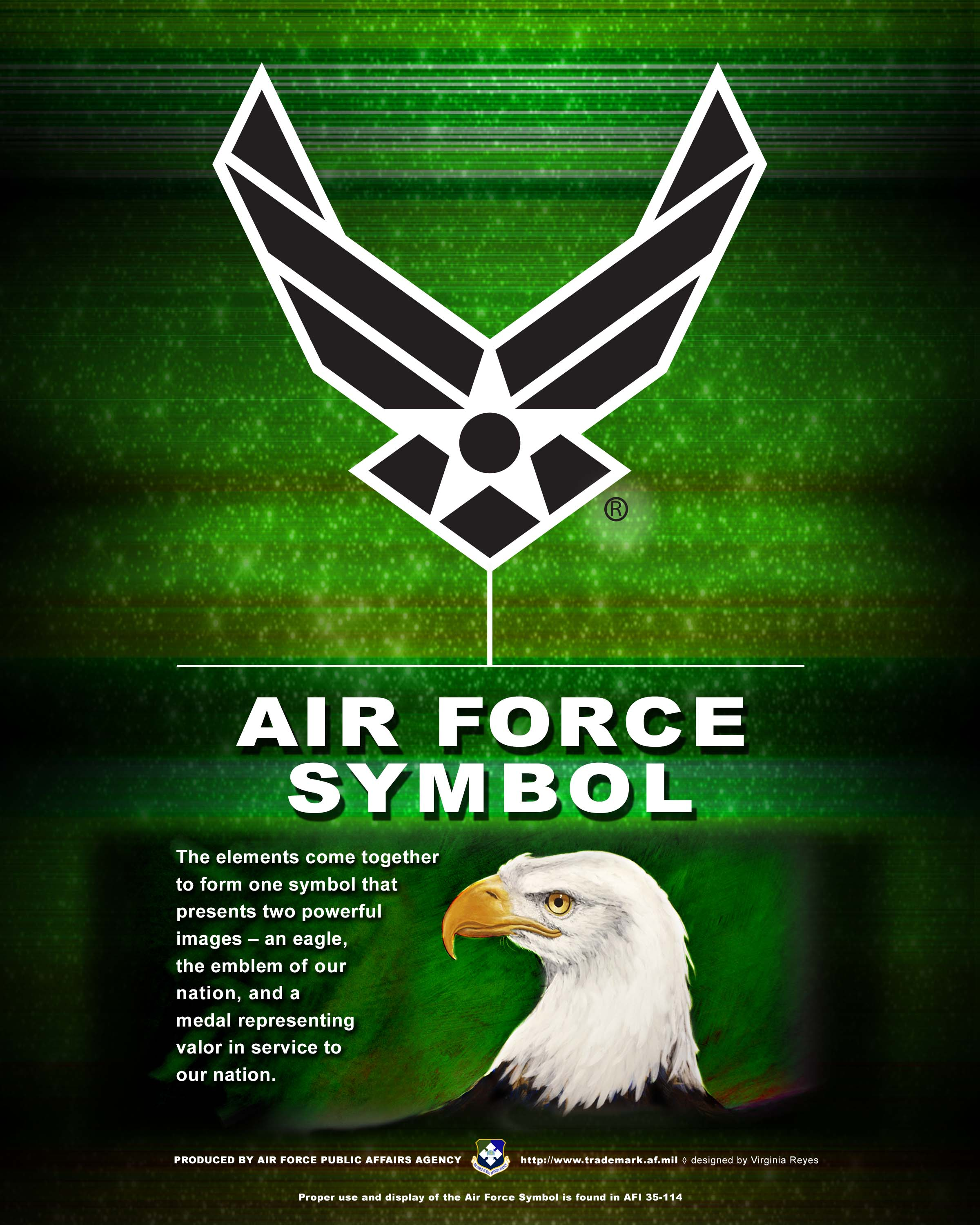
Air Force Public Affairs Agency poster featuring the symbol

According to the Air Force, the symbol "honors the heritage of our past and represents the promise of our future," and "retains the core elements of our Air Corps heritage -- the 'Arnold' wings and star with circle." The symbol is based on the classic "Hap" Arnold wings from the Second World War, while its modern style signifies the "present and future" capabilities of the service.

Unless approved by the Air Force Chief of Staff, the only words allowed beneath the Air Force Symbol are "U.S. Air Force," "Academy," and "ROTC." Certain approved emblems may be placed "between the wings," with the emblem being "half the height of the Symbol." The symbol is "available for use in blue, black, grey, chrome-silver, chrome-blue and white versions." On the official U.S. Air Force website, the meaning of the symbol was described as follows:

"The symbol has two main parts. In the upper half, the stylized wings represent the stripes of our strength -- the enlisted men and women of our force. They are drawn with great angularity to emphasize our swiftness and power, and they are divided into six sections which represent our distinctive capabilities -- air and space superiority, global attack, rapid global mobility, precision engagement, information superiority, and agile combat support.

"In the lower half are a sphere, a star and three diamonds. The sphere within the star represents the globe. It reminds us of our obligation to secure our nation's freedom with Global Vigilance, Reach and Power. The globe also reminds us of our challenge as an expeditionary force to respond rapidly to crises and to provide decisive aerospace power, worldwide.

"The area surrounding the sphere takes the shape of a star. The star has many meanings. Its five points represent the components of our Total Force and family -- our active duty, civilians, Guard, Reserve and retirees. The star symbolizes space as the high ground of our nation's air and space force. The rallying symbol in all our wars, the star also represents our officer corps, central to our combat leadership.

"The star is framed with three diamonds, which represent our core values -- integrity first, service before self and excellence in all we do. The elements come together to form one symbol that presents two powerful images -- at once it is an eagle, the emblem of our nation, and a medal, representing valor in service to our nation."

— U.S. Air Force, "The Meaning of Our Symbol"

== See also ==
- Space Force Delta
