= Air Force Combat Ammunition Center =

The Air Force Combat Ammunition Center (AFCOMAC) is a United States Air Force training course developed to provide the Air Force munitions community with advanced training in mass combat ammunition planning and production techniques. It uses a combination of in-depth classroom instruction combined with a four-day intensive practical exercise (IRON FLAG) using live munitions in a realistic, bare-base scenario. AFCOMAC was established in 1985 at Sierra Army Depot, California, as a response to a perceived degradation in the USAF's ability to rapidly produce ammunition for air combat operations during combat. AFCOMAC's intensive training effort from 1986 through 1991 helped prepare USAF munitions personnel for their role in the first Gulf War. Later AFCOMAC moved to Beale AFB, California.

AFCOMAC offers three courses:

- CAPP (Combat Ammunition Planning and Production) Course: a three-week course (two weeks of academics and one week of exercise) with a class size of 70–80 people in the grade of senior airman through captain. This course awards four credit hours towards CCAF and is a 7- and 9-level upgrade training requirement for all 2W0 personnel. Eight to Nine classes per fiscal year are taught.
- SOO (Senior Officer Orientation) Course: a companion class to CAPP and is conducted during the IRON FLAG practical exercise. This course combines hands-on training (in conjunction with the CAPP course) with seminar sessions to provide senior logistics and operations officers (major and above/civilian equivalents) with an appreciation and practical knowledge of mass munitions build-up operations. Nine classes per fiscal year are taught.
- AMMOS (Advanced Maintenance/Munitions Officers School): uses AFCOMAC as the ideal means to teach its six-day munitions block of this 5.5-month class. This course combines hand-on training (in conjunction with the CAPP course) with seminar sessions and coursework to provide maintenance/logistics captains with the expertise in the application of expeditionary logistics as it applies to the Ammo career field. Two classes per fiscal year are taught.

This squadron also provides day-to-day munitions support to the 9th Reconnaissance Wing at Beale AFB, CA and associated units.
