= Security incidents involving George W. Bush =

Bush's official portrait

George W. Bush, the 43rd president of the United States, was involved in several security incidents after being elected president in the 2000 United States presidential election.

== 2001 White House shooting ==
On February 7, 2001, while Bush was in the residence area of the White House, Robert W. Pickett, standing outside the perimeter fence, discharged a number of shots from a Taurus .38 Special revolver "in the general direction" of the White House. He was shot in the knee by a United States Secret Service agent and arrested.

Pickett was initially charged with discharging a firearm during a crime, carrying a 10-year mandatory sentence. Following a plea agreement, Pickett instead entered a guilty plea to a firearms violation and an Alford plea to assaulting a federal officer. He was sentenced to three years at the Federal Medical Center, Rochester followed by three years of probation.

== 2005 Tbilisi grenade attack ==
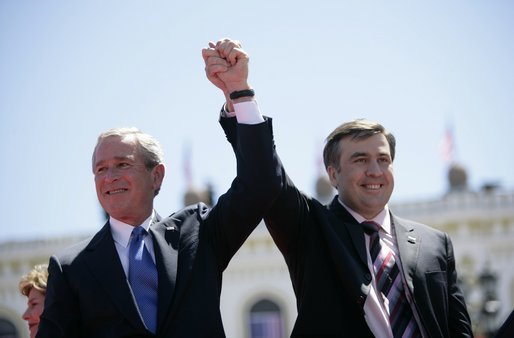
Bush and Georgia president Mikheil Saakashvili, May 10, 2005

On May 10, 2005, while Bush was giving a speech in Freedom Square, Tbilisi, Vladimir Arutyunian, a native Georgian who was born to a family of ethnic Armenians, threw a live Soviet-made RGD-5 hand grenade toward the podium. It landed in the crowd about 61 feet (19 m) from the podium after hitting a girl, but it did not detonate because a red tartan handkerchief was wrapped tightly around it, preventing the safety lever from detaching. Georgian President Mikheil Saakashvili was seated nearby. After escaping that day, Arutyunian was arrested in July 2005. During his arrest, he killed an Interior Ministry agent. He was convicted in January 2006 and given a life sentence.

== 2008 Baghdad shoeing ==
On December 14, 2008, Iraqi journalist Muntadhar al-Zaidi threw both of his shoes at Bush during an Iraqi press conference, shouting "This is a farewell kiss from the Iraqi people, dog". Bush quickly ducked, avoiding being hit by either of the shoes. The second shoe hit the US flag, and Al-Zaidi was subsequently grabbed, kicked, and hurried out of the room by guards. Al-Zaidi received a three-year prison sentence, which was reduced to two years. On September 15, 2009, after nine months of incarceration, he was released early because he had no prior criminal record.

== See also ==
- Security incidents involving Barack Obama
- Security incidents involving Donald Trump
- Security incidents involving Mahathir Mohamad
