= List of United States presidential assassination attempts and plots =

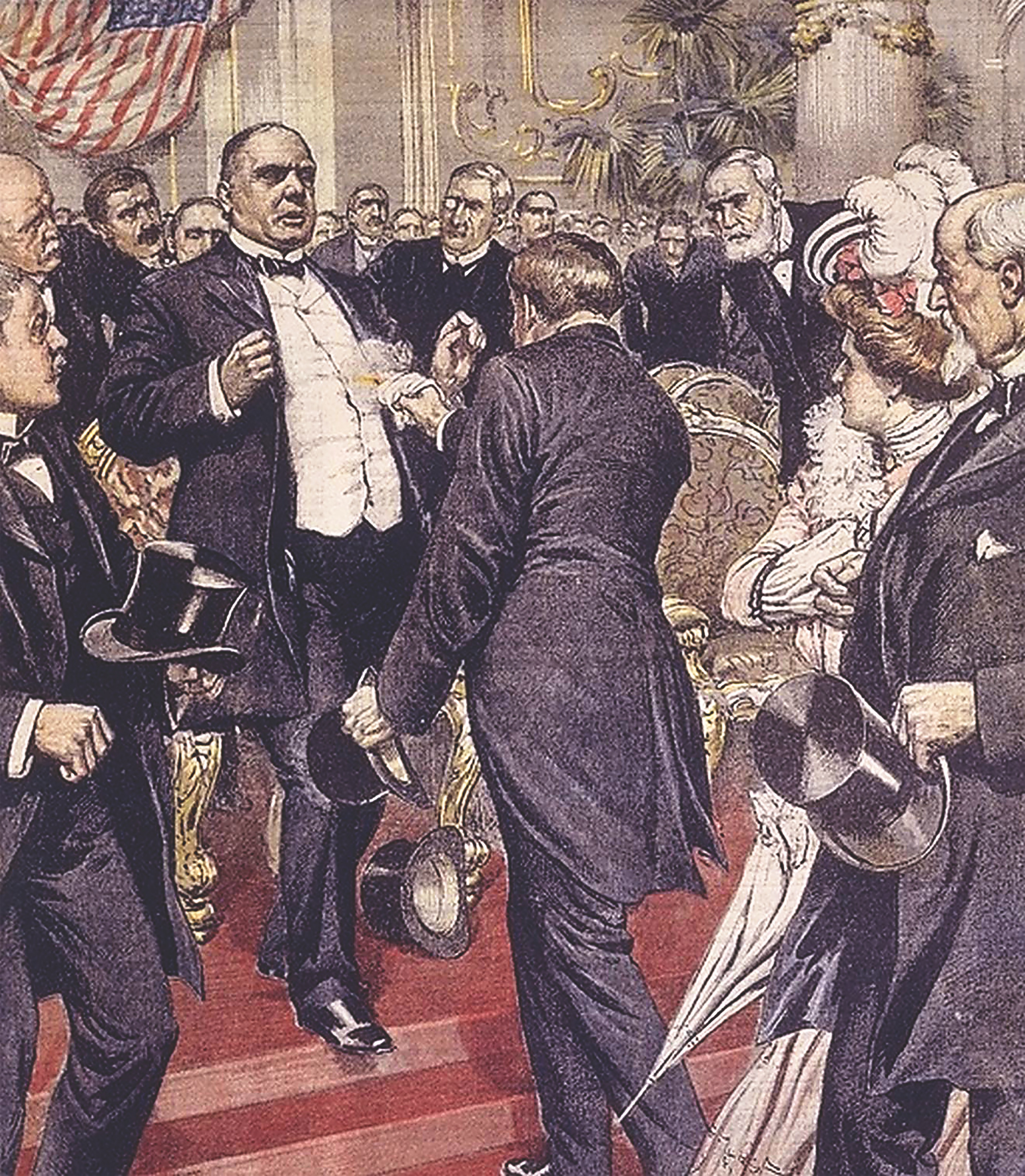
Illustration by Achille Beltrame of the assassination of President William McKinley (1901)

Assassination attempts and plots on the president of the United States have been numerous, ranging from the early 19th century to the present day. This article lists assassinations and assassination attempts on incumbent and former presidents and presidents-elect, but not on those who had not yet been elected president.

Four sitting U.S. presidents have been killed: Abraham Lincoln (1865), James A. Garfield (1881), William McKinley (1901), and John F. Kennedy (1963). Ronald Reagan (1981) is the only sitting president to have been wounded in an assassination attempt and survive. Theodore Roosevelt (1912) was wounded in an assassination attempt as a former president. Donald Trump (2024) was wounded in an assassination attempt in between his two terms.

== Background ==
Many assassination attempts, both successful and unsuccessful, were motivated by a desire to change the policy of the American government. Not all such attacks, however, had political reasons. Many other attackers had questionable mental stability, and a few were judged legally insane. Historian James W. Clarke suggests that most assassination attempters have been sane and politically motivated, whereas the Department of Justice's legal manual claims that a large majority have been insane. Some assassins, especially mentally ill ones, acted solely on their own, whereas those pursuing political agendas have more often found supporting conspirators. Most assassination plotters were arrested and punished by execution or lengthy detention in a prison or insane asylum.

The fact that the successor of a removed president is the vice president, and all vice presidents since Andrew Johnson have shared the president's political party affiliation, may discourage such attacks, at least for policy reasons, even in times of partisan strife.

Threats of violence against the president are often made for rhetorical or humorous effect without serious intent, while credibly threatening the president of the United States has been a federal felony since 1917.

== Presidents assassinated ==
=== Abraham Lincoln ===
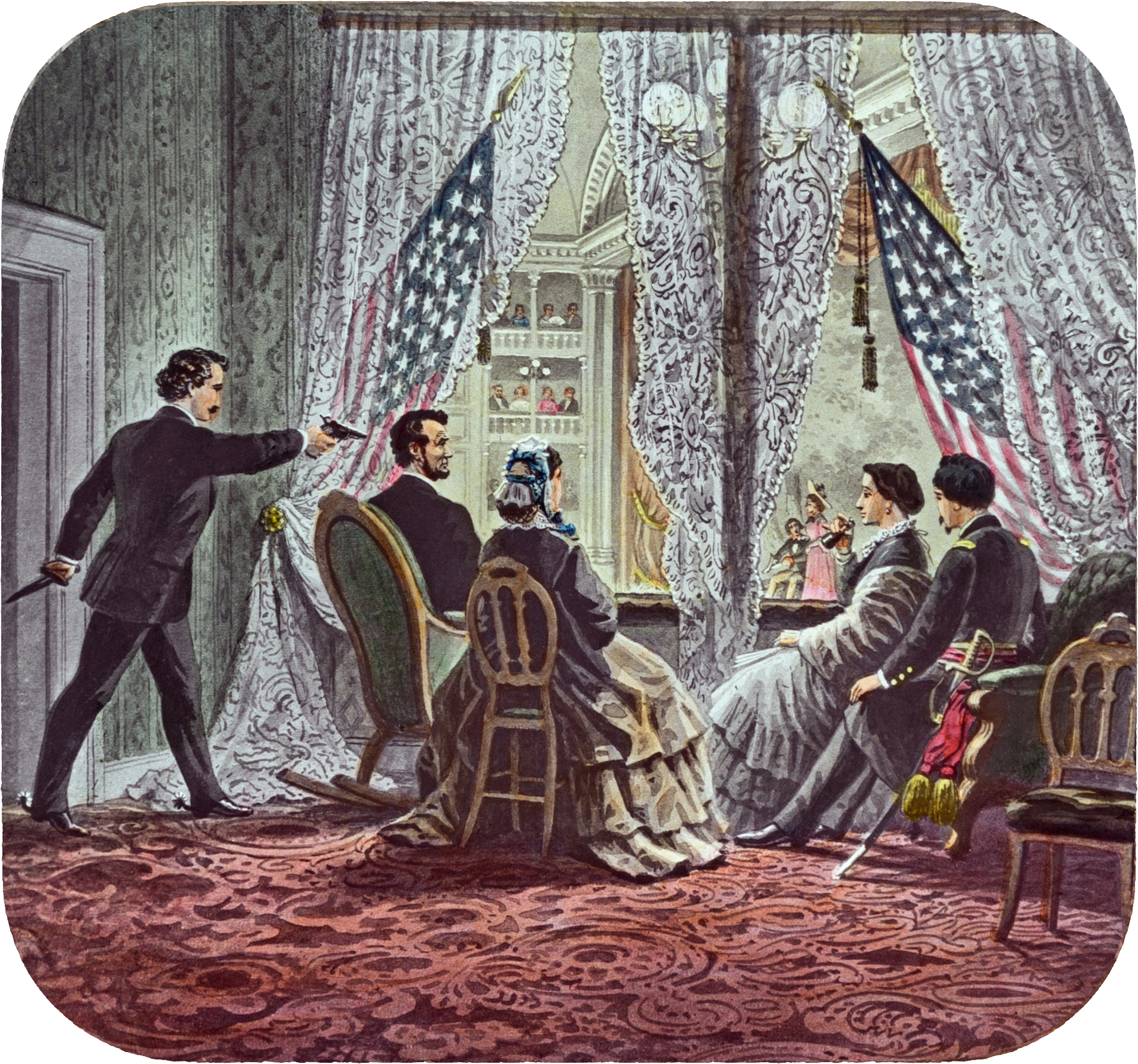
John Wilkes Booth shooting Abraham Lincoln at Ford's Theatre. Drawing from glass-slide depiction c. 1865–1875

Abraham Lincoln, the 16th president of the United States, was the first U.S. president to be assassinated (but not the first to die in office). The assassination took place on Good Friday, April 14, 1865, at Ford's Theatre in Washington, D.C., at about 10:15 PM. The assassin, John Wilkes Booth, was a well-known actor and a Confederate sympathizer from Maryland; though he never joined the Confederate Army, he had contacts within the Confederate Secret Service. In 1864, Booth formulated a plan (very similar to one of Thomas N. Conrad previously authorized by the Confederacy) to kidnap Lincoln in exchange for the release of Confederate prisoners. After attending an April 11, 1865 speech in which Lincoln promoted voting rights for African Americans, Booth decided to assassinate the president instead. Learning that the president would be attending Ford's Theatre, Booth planned with co-conspirators to assassinate Lincoln at the theater. The conspiracy also included assassinating Vice President Andrew Johnson in Kirkwood House, where Johnson lived while Vice President, and Secretary of State William H. Seward at Seward's house. On April 14, 1865, Lincoln attended the play Our American Cousin at Ford's Theatre. As the president sat in his state box in the balcony watching the play with his wife Mary and two guests, Major Henry Rathbone and Rathbone's fiancée Clara Harris, Booth entered the box and shot Lincoln in the back of the head, with a .44-caliber Derringer pistol, mortally wounding him and rendering him unconscious immediately. Booth stabbed Rathbone as Rathbone came at him, and escaped also stabbing orchestra leader William Withers Jr. Lincoln was taken across the street to the Petersen House, where he remained in a coma for nine hours, before he died at 7:22 AM on April 15. Lincoln was succeeded by Vice President Andrew Johnson.

Beyond Lincoln's death, the plot failed: Seward was only wounded, and Johnson's would-be attacker did not follow through. After being on the run for 12 days, Booth was tracked down and found on April 26, 1865, by Union Army soldiers at a farm in Virginia, some 70 miles (110 km) south of Washington. After refusing to surrender, Booth was shot and mortally wounded by Union cavalryman Boston Corbett. Eight other conspirators were later convicted for their roles in the conspiracy; four were hanged and four received life sentences.

=== James A. Garfield ===
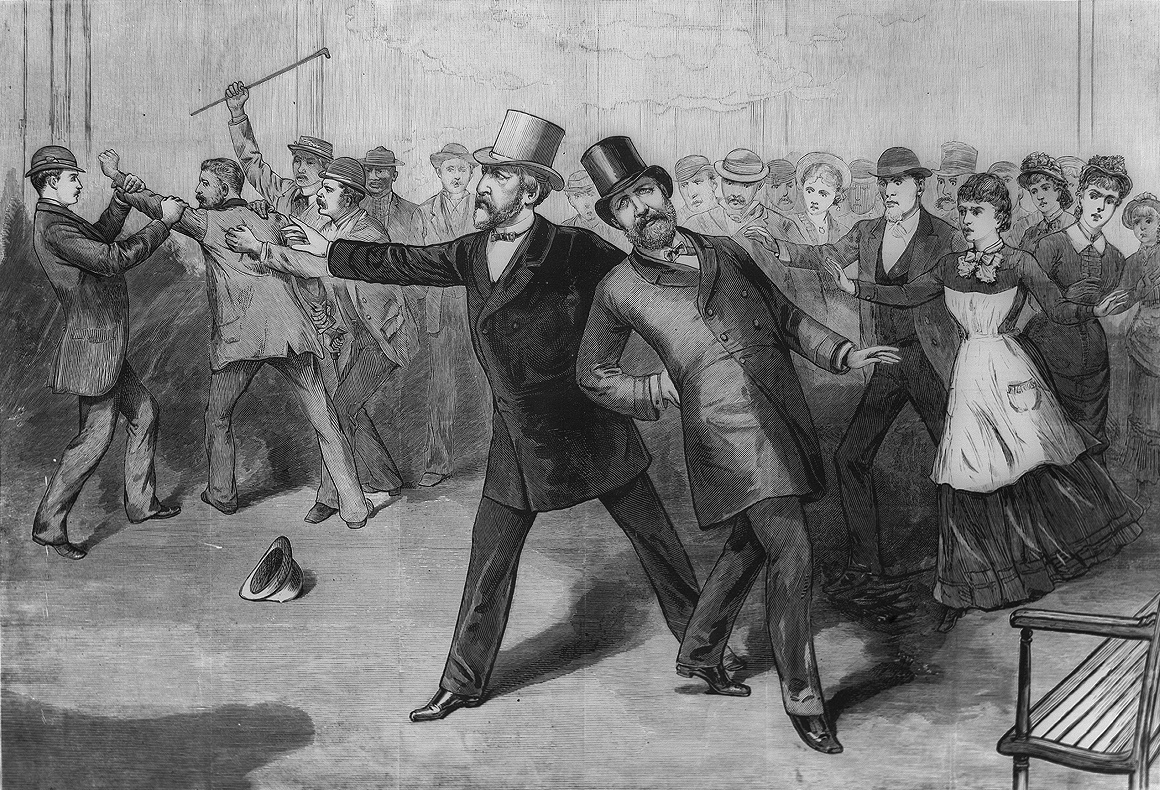
President James A. Garfield with James G. Blaine after being shot by Charles J. Guiteau

The assassination of James A. Garfield took place at the Baltimore and Potomac Railroad Station in Washington, D.C., at 9:20 AM on Saturday, July 2, 1881, less than four months after he took office. As the president was arriving at the train station, writer and lawyer Charles J. Guiteau shot him twice with a .442 Webley British Bull Dog revolver; one bullet grazed the president's shoulder, and the other pierced his back. For the next eleven weeks, Garfield endured the pain and suffering from having been shot, before he died on September 19, 1881, at 10:35 PM, of complications caused by iatrogenic infections, which were contracted by the doctors' relentless probing of his wound with unsterilized fingers and instruments; he had survived for a total of 79 days after being shot. Garfield was succeeded by Vice President Chester A. Arthur.

Guiteau was immediately arrested. After a highly publicized trial lasting from November 14, 1881, to January 25, 1882, he was found guilty and sentenced to death. A subsequent appeal was rejected, and he was executed by hanging on June 30, 1882, in the District of Columbia. Guiteau was assessed during his trial and autopsy as mentally unbalanced or suffering from the effects of neurosyphilis. He claimed to have shot Garfield out of disappointment at being passed over for appointment as Ambassador to France. He attributed the president's victory in the election to a speech he wrote in support of Garfield.

=== William McKinley ===
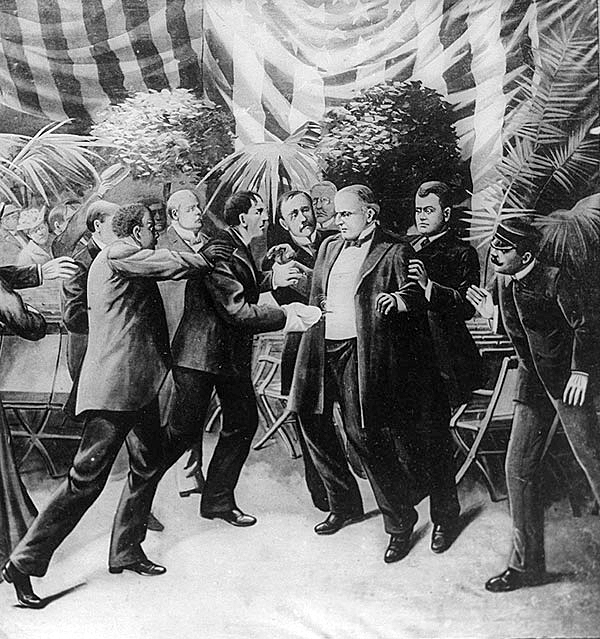
Leon Czolgosz shoots President William McKinley with a concealed revolver under a cloth rag. Clipping of a wash drawing by T. Dart Walker.

The assassination of president William McKinley took place at 4:07 PM on Friday, September 6, 1901, at the Temple of Music in Buffalo, New York. McKinley, attending the Pan-American Exposition, was shot twice in the abdomen at close range by Leon Czolgosz, an anarchist, who was armed with a .32-caliber Iver Johnson "Safety Automatic" revolver that was concealed underneath a handkerchief. The first bullet ricocheted off either a button or an award medal on McKinley's jacket and lodged in his sleeve; the second shot pierced his stomach. James Benjamin Parker, who had been standing behind the assassin in line, was the first to grab Czolgosz and the revolver. Other individuals jumped in and the group subdued Czolgosz before he could fire a third shot. They beat Czolgosz severely until McKinley was able to order the beating to stop. Although McKinley initially appeared to be recovering in the week after, his condition rapidly declined due to gangrene setting in around his wounds and he died on September 14, 1901, at 2:15 AM. McKinley was succeeded by Vice President Theodore Roosevelt.

On September 24, after a two-day trial, in which the defendant refused to defend himself, Czolgosz was convicted and later sentenced to death. He was executed by the electric chair in Auburn Prison on October 29, 1901. Czolgosz's actions were politically motivated, although it remains unclear what outcome, if any, he believed the shooting would yield.

Following President McKinley's assassination, Congress directed the Secret Service to protect the president of the United States as part of its mandate.

=== John F. Kennedy ===
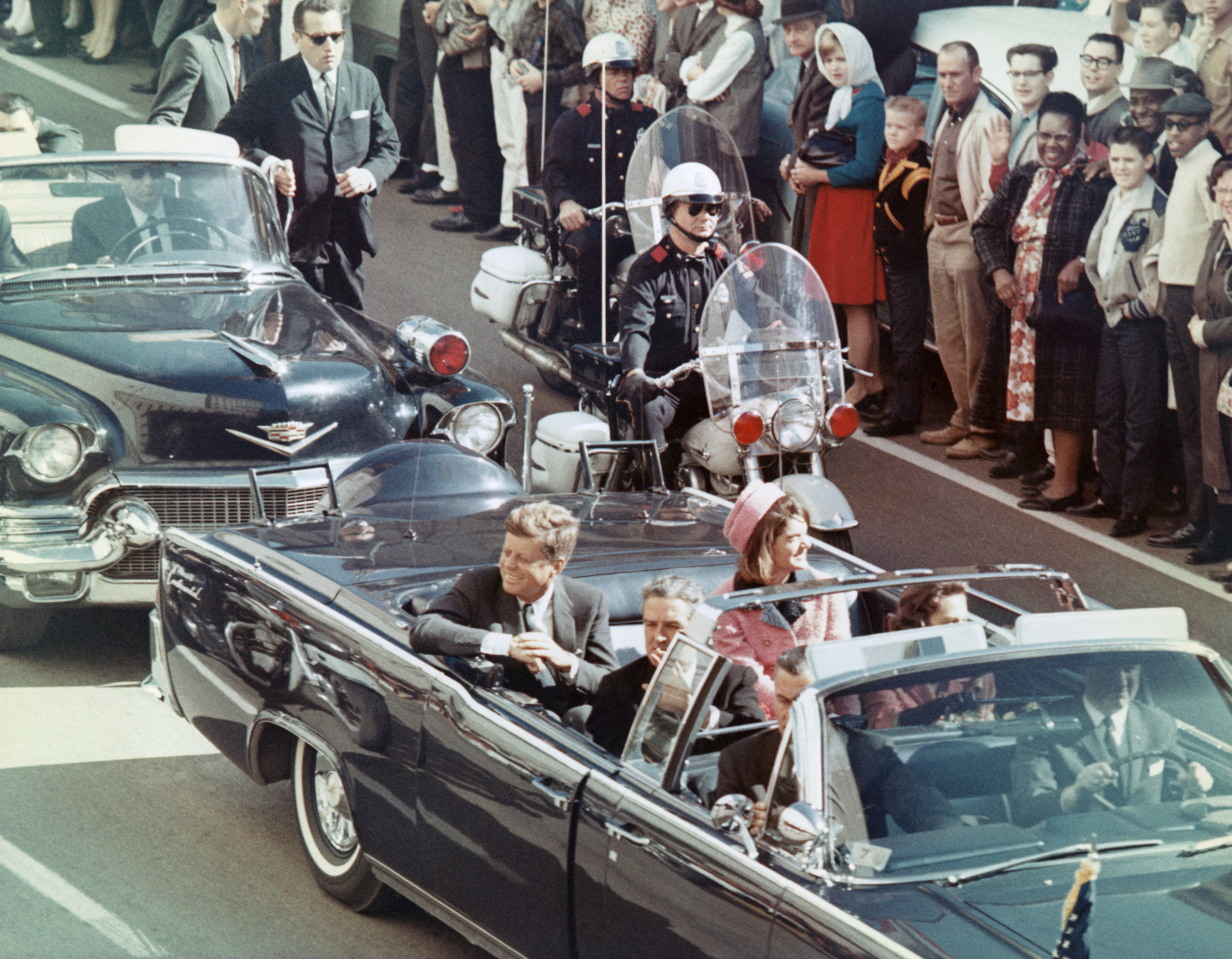
President John F. Kennedy, his wife Jacqueline, and the Connallys in the presidential limousine minutes before the assassination

The assassination of United States president John F. Kennedy took place at 12:30 PM on Friday, November 22, 1963, in Dallas, Texas, during a presidential motorcade in Dealey Plaza. Kennedy was riding with his wife Jacqueline, Texas Governor John Connally, and Connally's wife Nellie when he was fatally shot; he was hit once in the back, the bullet exiting via his throat, and once in the head. Governor Connally was seriously wounded, and bystander James Tague received a minor facial injury from a small piece of curbstone that had fragmented after it was struck by one of the bullets. The motorcade rushed to Parkland Memorial Hospital, where Kennedy was declared dead at 1:00 PM. Kennedy was succeeded by Vice President Lyndon B. Johnson.

After a 6.5×52mm Carcano Model 38 rifle was found on the sixth floor of the Texas School Book Depository, depository worker Lee Harvey Oswald, a former U.S. Marine and American defector was arrested and charged by the Dallas Police Department for the assassination and for the murder of Dallas policeman J. D. Tippit, who was shot dead in a residential neighborhood in the Oak Cliff section of Dallas less than an hour after the assassination. On Sunday, November 24, while being transferred from the city jail to the county jail, Oswald was shot and mortally wounded in the basement of Dallas Police Department Headquarters by Dallas nightclub owner Jack Ruby. Oswald died at Parkland Hospital. Ruby was convicted of Oswald's murder, albeit his conviction was later overturned on appeal. He died in 1967 while awaiting a new trial, and his motivation remains unknown.

In 1964, the Warren Commission concluded that Kennedy and Tippit were killed by Oswald, that Oswald had acted entirely alone in both murders, and that Ruby had acted alone in killing Oswald. The commission's findings have been supported by some writers but also challenged by various critics who hypothesize that there was a conspiracy surrounding the Kennedy assassination.

In 1979, the House Select Committee on Assassinations released a report, stating that "the committee believes, on the basis of the evidence available to it, that President John F. Kennedy was probably assassinated as a result of a conspiracy. The committee was unable to identify the other gunmen or the extent of the conspiracy." The chief reason for the conclusion of "probable conspiracy" was, according to the report's dissent, the subsequently discredited acoustic analysis of a police channel Dictabelt recording. In accordance with the recommendations of the HSCA, the Dictabelt recording and acoustic evidence of a second assassin were subsequently reexamined. In light of investigative reports from the FBI's Technical Services Division and a specially appointed National Academy of Sciences Committee determining that "reliable acoustic data do not support a conclusion that there was a second gunman," the Justice Department concluded "that no persuasive evidence can be identified to support the theory of a conspiracy" in the Kennedy assassination.

== Incumbent presidents wounded ==
=== Ronald Reagan ===
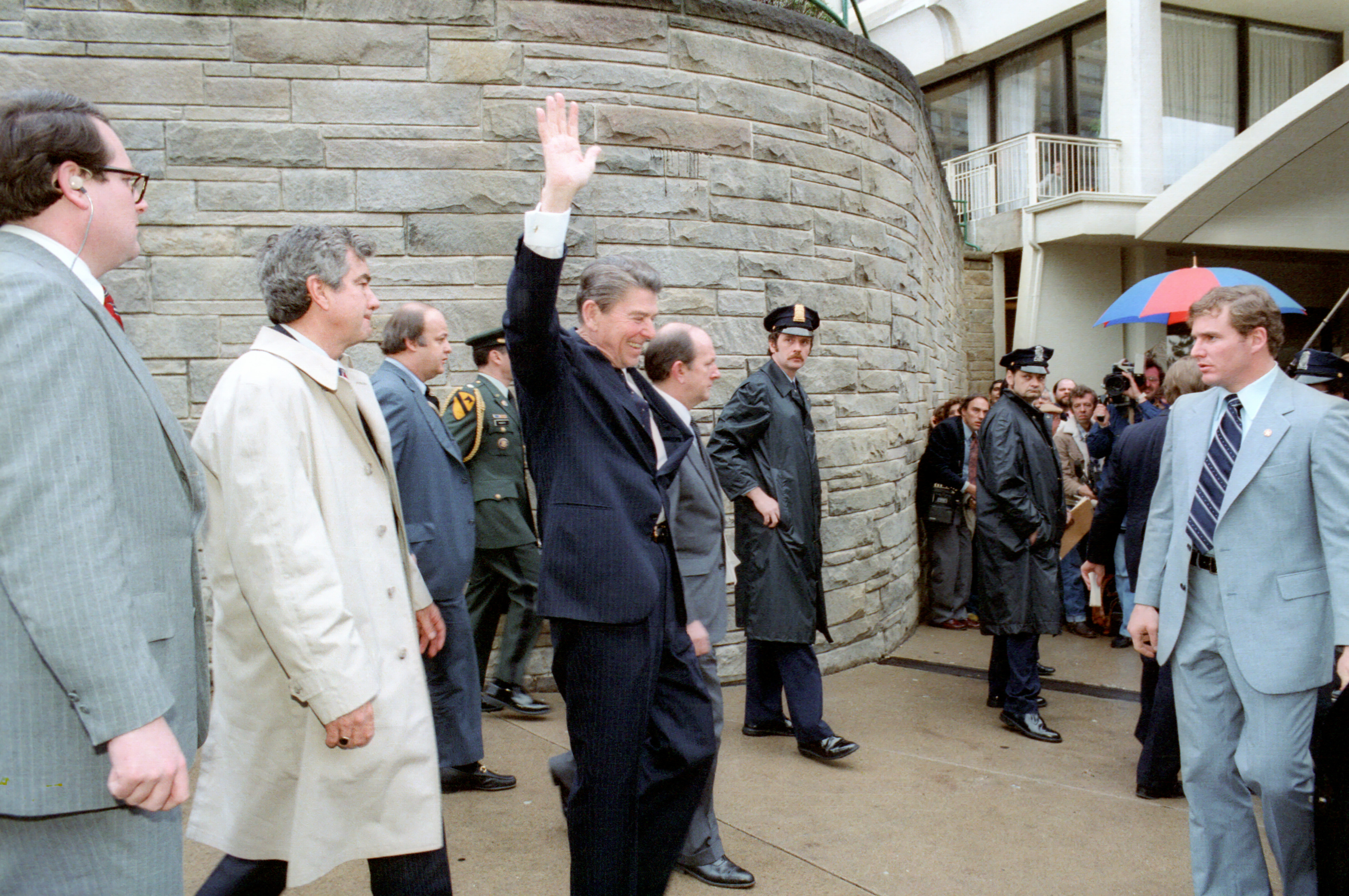
President Ronald Reagan (center) waves just before he is shot outside a Washington, D.C. hotel on March 30, 1981.

On March 30, 1981, as Ronald Reagan was returning to his limousine after speaking at the Washington Hilton hotel, John Hinckley Jr. fired six shots from a .22 caliber Röhm RG-14 revolver. Reagan was seriously wounded when one bullet ricocheted off the side of the presidential limousine and hit him in the left underarm, breaking a rib, puncturing a lung, and causing serious internal bleeding. Although "close to death" upon arrival at George Washington University Hospital, Reagan was stabilized in the emergency room, and then underwent emergency exploratory surgery. He was released from the hospital on April 11. Besides Reagan, White House press secretary James Brady, Secret Service agent Tim McCarthy, and police officer Thomas Delahanty were also wounded. All three survived, but Brady suffered brain damage and was permanently disabled; Brady died in 2014 as a result of his injuries. His death was ruled as homicide, since it was directly related to his assassination.

Hinckley was immediately arrested, and said he had wanted to kill Reagan to impress actress Jodie Foster. He was deemed mentally ill and confined to an institution. Hinckley was released from institutional psychiatric care on September 10, 2016.

== Former presidents wounded ==
=== Theodore Roosevelt ===
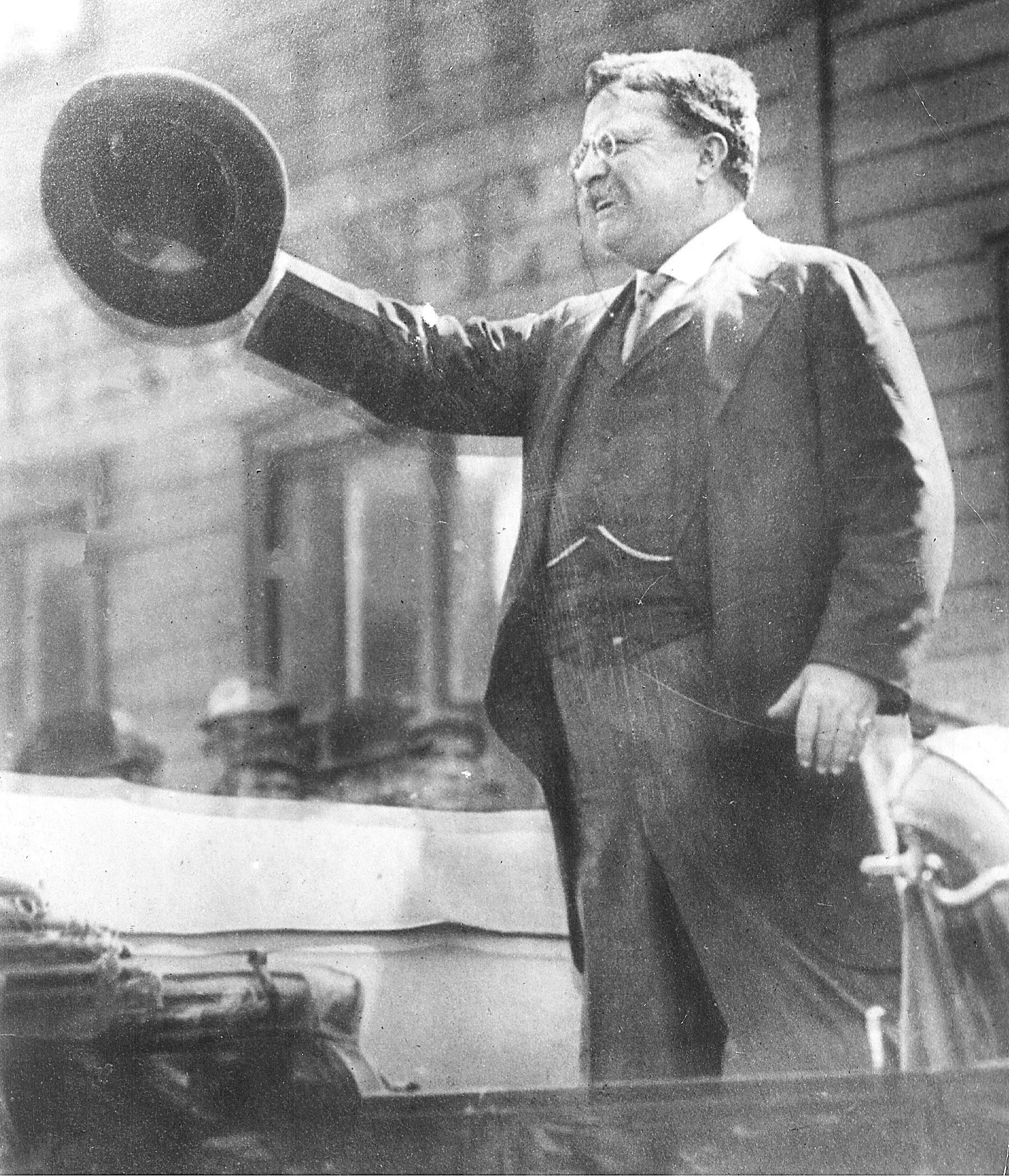
Theodore Roosevelt speaking from a car in Milwaukee on October 14, 1912, shortly before being shot

Three-and-a-half years after he left office, Theodore Roosevelt ran in the 1912 presidential election as a member of the Bull Moose Party. While campaigning in Milwaukee, Wisconsin, on October 14, 1912, John Schrank, a saloon-keeper from New York who had been stalking him for weeks, shot Roosevelt once in the chest with a .38-caliber Colt Police Positive Special. The 50-page text of his campaign speech titled "Progressive Cause Greater Than Any Individual," folded over twice in Roosevelt's breast pocket, and a metal glasses case slowed the bullet, saving his life. Schrank was immediately disarmed, captured, and might have been lynched had Roosevelt not shouted for Schrank to remain unharmed. Roosevelt assured the crowd he was all right, then ordered police to take charge of Schrank and to make sure no violence was done to him.

Roosevelt, as an experienced hunter and anatomist, correctly concluded that since he was not coughing blood, the bullet had not reached his lung, and he declined suggestions to go to the hospital immediately. Instead, he delivered his scheduled speech with blood seeping into his shirt. He spoke for 84 minutes before completing his speech and accepting medical attention. His opening comments to the gathered crowd were, "Ladies and gentlemen, I don't know whether you fully understand that I have just been shot, but it takes more than that to kill a Bull Moose." Afterwards, probes and an x-ray showed that the bullet had lodged in Roosevelt's chest muscle, but did not penetrate the pulmonary pleurae. Doctors concluded that it would be less dangerous to leave it in place than to attempt to remove it, and the bullet remained in Roosevelt's body for the remainder of his life. He spent two weeks recuperating before returning to the campaign trail. Despite his tenacity, Roosevelt ultimately lost his bid for reelection to the Democratic candidate Woodrow Wilson.

At Schrank's trial, the would-be assassin claimed that William McKinley had visited him in a dream and told him to avenge his assassination by killing Roosevelt. He was found legally insane and was institutionalized until his death in 1943.

=== Donald Trump ===
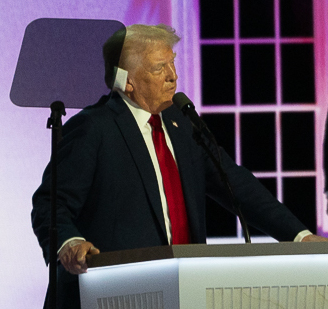
Trump wearing a bandage on his ear at the 2024 Republican National Convention, two days after being shot

On July 13, 2024, then-former president Donald Trump, and the Republican Party's presumptive nominee in the presidential election that year, was shot while addressing a campaign rally near Butler, Pennsylvania. Shortly after Trump began addressing the rally, 20-year-old Thomas Crooks fired eight rounds with an AR-15–style rifle, equipped with a red dot gun sight, from the roof of a building located around 400 feet (120 meters) from the stage. Crooks also killed audience member Corey Comperatore and critically injured two other audience members. Crooks was shot and killed by the U.S. Secret Service's counter-sniper team. Trump was hit by a bullet, wounding his right ear, and he took cover on the floor of the podium, where he was shielded by Secret Service personnel. After agents helped him to his feet, Trump emerged with blood on his ear and face. He then either mouthed or shouted the words "Fight! Fight! Fight!" Trump was escorted off-stage and taken to a nearby hospital before being released in stable condition a few hours later.

Due to the lack of security at the rally, the director of the Secret Service, Kimberly Cheatle, faced bipartisan calls to resign when she testified before the United States House Committee on Oversight and Accountability on July 22; she stepped down the next day. President Joe Biden ordered an independent review of the security arrangements, condemned the violence, and called for a reduction in heated political rhetoric, emphasizing the importance of resolving political differences peacefully. Lawmakers called for increased security for major candidates in the election, and the Secret Service approved enhanced security measures, including the use of bulletproof glass at Trump's outdoor rallies. In November 2025, the FBI concluded its investigation, finding that Crooks acted alone with no clear motive identified. The lack of security at the rally and the lack of public information about Crooks has led to conspiracy theories.

== Other attacks, assassination attempts, and plots ==
=== Andrew Jackson ===
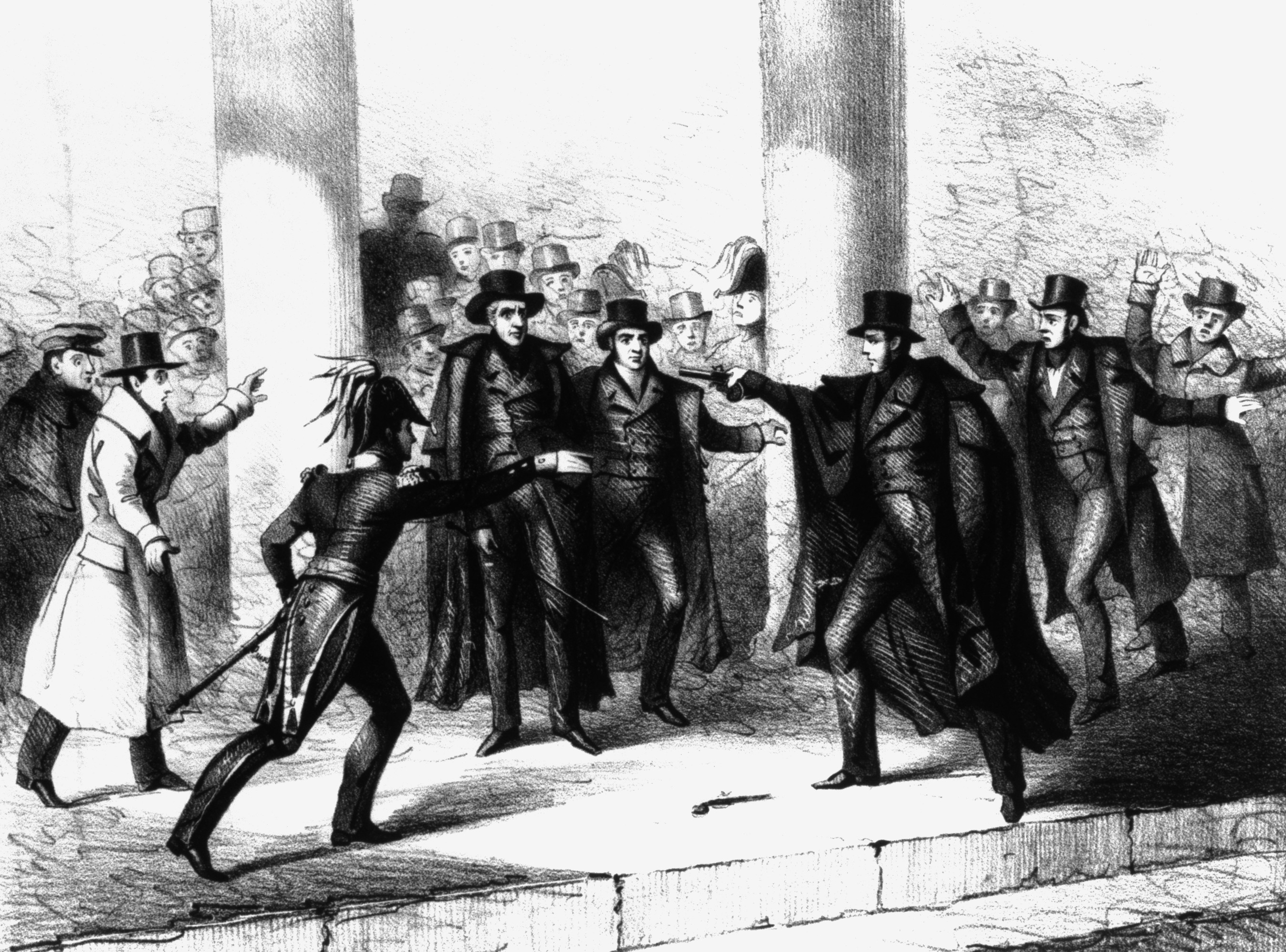
Illustration of Jackson's attempted assassination

- January 30, 1835: Just outside the Capitol Building, a house painter named Richard Lawrence attempted to shoot President Andrew Jackson with two pistols, both of which misfired. Later somebody tried the two pistols and both worked fine. Lawrence was apprehended after Jackson beat him severely with his cane. Lawrence was found not guilty by reason of insanity and confined to a mental institution until his death in 1861.

=== Abraham Lincoln ===
- February 23, 1861: President-elect Lincoln passed through Baltimore, Maryland amid threats of the Baltimore Plot, an alleged conspiracy by Confederate sympathizers in Maryland to assassinate Lincoln en route to his inauguration. Allan Pinkerton's National Detective Agency played a key role in protecting the president-elect by managing Lincoln's security throughout the journey. Although scholars debate whether the threat was real, Lincoln and his advisers took action to ensure his safe passage through Baltimore.
- December 1863: Confederate agent Godfrey Joseph Hyams claimed in 1865 that in December 1863 he had been recruited by Luke P. Blackburn into a plot to infect Northern cities with yellow fever by distributing clothes from patients infected with the disease throughout the target cities. Hyams also alleged that Blackburn had told him to deliver a batch of contaminated clothes to the White House to infect President Lincoln, but he had disobeyed this order. Unknown at the time was the fact that yellow fever is spread by mosquito bites and not by touch, so any such plot was doomed to failure. Blackburn stood trial after Hyams went public with his allegations but was acquitted.
- August 1864: A lone rifle shot fired by an unknown sniper missed Lincoln's head by inches (passing through his hat) as he rode in the late evening, unguarded, north from the White House three miles (5 km) to the Soldiers' Home (his regular retreat where he would work and sleep before returning to the White House the following morning). Near 11:00 PM, Private John W. Nichols of the Pennsylvania 150th Volunteers, the sentry on duty at the gated entrance to the Soldiers' Home grounds, heard the rifle shot and moments later saw the president riding toward him "bareheaded". Lincoln described the matter to Ward Lamon, his old friend and loyal bodyguard.
- April 1865: On April 1, Confederate agent Thomas F. Harney was dispatched from Richmond to Washington, D.C., on a mission to decapitate the United States government by killing President Lincoln and his cabinet. The plan was that Harney would blow up the White House after gaining access via a secret underground entrance. Union troops were tipped off about the plot by Confederate soldier William H. Snyder and Harney was arrested en route to Washington on April 10.
- April 11, 1865: John Wilkes Booth, who would make a successful attempt on Lincoln's life three days later, attended Lincoln's final public address in Washington, D.C., with his future co-conspirators David Herold and Lewis Powell. During the speech, Booth became enraged when Lincoln expressed his support for granting voting rights to former slaves and ordered Powell to shoot Lincoln. Powell ultimately decided against it for fear of the crowd, but Booth vowed to "put him through" and formulated a plan to kill Lincoln which came to fruition on April 14.

=== William Howard Taft ===
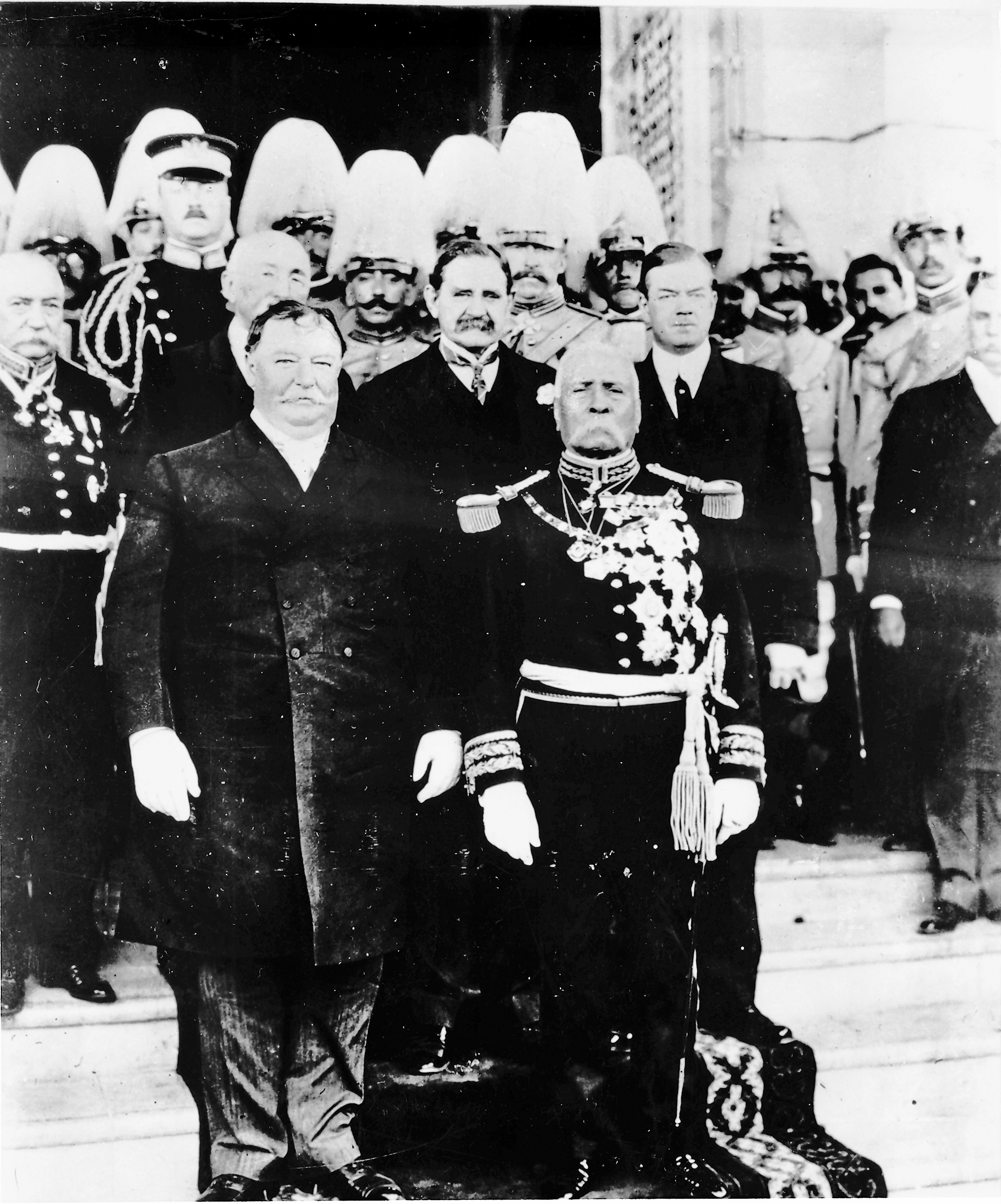
William Taft and Porfirio Díaz, historic first presidential summit, Ciudad Juárez, Mexico, October 16, 1909

- 1909: William Howard Taft and Porfirio Díaz planned a summit in El Paso, Texas, and Ciudad Juárez, Chihuahua, a historic first meeting between a U.S. president and a Mexican president and also the first time an American president would cross the border into Mexico. Díaz requested the meeting to show U.S. support for his planned eighth run as president, and Taft agreed to support Díaz in order to protect the several billion dollars of American capital then invested in Mexico. Both sides agreed that the disputed Chamizal strip connecting El Paso to Ciudad Juárez would be considered neutral territory with no flags present during the summit, but the meeting focused attention on this territory and resulted in assassination threats and other serious security concerns. The Texas Rangers, 4,000 U.S. and Mexican troops, U.S. Secret Service agents, FBI agents, and U.S. Marshals were all called in to provide security. An additional 250-member private security detail led by Frederick Russell Burnham, the celebrated scout, was hired by John Hays Hammond. Hammond was a close friend of Taft from Yale University and a former candidate for U.S. vice president in the 1908 presidential election who, along with his business partner Burnham, held considerable mining interests in Mexico. On October 16, the day of the summit, Burnham and Private C.R. Moore, a Texas Ranger, discovered a man with a concealed palm pistol standing at the El Paso Chamber of Commerce building close to the procession route. Burnham and Moore captured and disarmed the gunman within only a few feet (around one meter) of Taft and Díaz.
- 1910: President Taft visited his aunt, Delia Torrey, in Millbury, Massachusetts. Torrey later reported receiving a stranger who allegedly overheard an assassination plot in Boston, Massachusetts. Before leaving nearby Worcester, Massachusetts by train, he threatened Torrey, who claimed the stranger "did not want anything to get into the papers, and if it did he would come back and kill me." Torrey reported the plot to the local police, who shared the allegation with the Worcester Police and the Secret Service. The man was never identified.

=== Herbert Hoover ===
- November 19, 1928: President-elect Hoover embarked on a ten-nation "goodwill tour" of Central and South America. While he was crossing the Andes Mountains from Chile, an assassination plot by Argentine anarchists was thwarted. The group was led by Severino Di Giovanni, who planned to blow up his train as it crossed the Argentinian central plain. The plotters had an itinerary but the bomber was arrested before he could place the explosives on the rails. Hoover professed unconcern, tearing off the front page of a newspaper that revealed the plot and explaining, "It's just as well that Lou shouldn't see it," referring to his wife. His complimentary remarks on Argentina were well received in both the host country and in the press.

=== Franklin D. Roosevelt ===
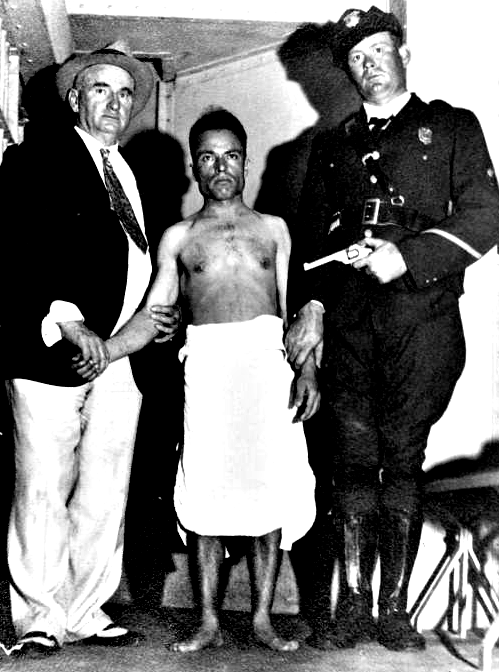
Giuseppe Zangara after his arrest

- February 15, 1933: Seventeen days before Roosevelt's first presidential inauguration, Giuseppe Zangara fired five shots at Roosevelt in Miami, Florida. Zangara's shots missed the president-elect, but Zangara did mortally wound Chicago Mayor Anton Cermak and injured four other people. Zangara pleaded guilty to the murder of Cermak and was executed in the electric chair on March 20, 1933. It has never been conclusively determined who was Zangara's target, but most assumed at first that he had been shooting at the president-elect. Another theory is that the attempt may have been ordered by the imprisoned Al Capone, and that Cermak, who had led a crackdown on the Chicago Outfit and Chicago organized crime more generally, was the true target.
- 1943: Soviet NKVD claimed to have discovered a Nazi German Waffen-SS plan to assassinate Roosevelt, Winston Churchill, and Joseph Stalin at the Tehran Conference.

=== Harry S. Truman ===
- Mid-1947: During the Jewish insurgency in Palestine before the formation of the State of Israel, the Zionist paramilitary organization Lehi was alleged to have sent a number of letter bombs addressed to the president and high-ranking staff at the White House. At the time, the incident was not publicized, but Truman's daughter Margaret Truman disclosed the alleged incident in her biography of Truman published in 1972; the allegation was previously disclosed in a memoir by Ira R. T. Smith, who worked in the mail room. According to Truman, the Secret Service was alerted by British intelligence after similar letters had been sent to high-ranking British officials and Lehi claimed credit; the mail room of the White House intercepted the letters intended for President Truman and the Secret Service defused them.
- November 1, 1950: Two Puerto Rican pro-independence activists, Oscar Collazo and Griselio Torresola, attempted to kill President Truman at the Blair House, where Truman was living while the White House was undergoing major renovations. In the attack, Torresola injured White House policeman Joseph Downs and mortally wounded White House policeman Leslie Coffelt. Coffelt returned fire, killing Torresola with a shot to the head. Collazo wounded an officer before being shot in the stomach. Collazo survived with serious injuries; Coffelt died of his wounds 4 hours later in a hospital. Truman was not harmed, but he was placed at a huge risk. Collazo was convicted in a federal trial and received the death sentence. Truman commuted Collazo's death sentence to life in prison. In 1979, President Jimmy Carter further commuted Collazo's sentence to time served.

=== John F. Kennedy ===
- December 11, 1960: While vacationing in Palm Beach, Florida, President-elect John F. Kennedy was threatened by Richard Paul Pavlick, a 73-year-old former postal worker from Belmont, New Hampshire, driven by hatred of Catholics. Pavlick intended to crash his dynamite-laden 1950 Buick into Kennedy's vehicle, but he changed his mind after seeing Kennedy's wife and daughter bid him goodbye. Pavlick was arrested four days later by the Secret Service after being stopped for a driving violation; police found the dynamite in his car and arrested him. On January 27, 1961, Pavlick was committed to the United States Public Health Service mental hospital in Springfield, Missouri, then was indicted for threatening Kennedy's life seven weeks later. Charges against Pavlick were dropped on December 2, 1963, ten days after Kennedy's assassination in Dallas. Judge Emett Clay Choate ruled that Pavlick was unable to distinguish between right and wrong in his actions, but kept him in the mental hospital. The federal government also dropped charges in August 1964, and Pavlick was eventually released from the New Hampshire State Hospital on December 13, 1966. He died in 1975, aged 88.
- November 1963: 30-year-old Chicago native Thomas Arthur Vallee was suspected of attempting to assassinate President John F. Kennedy in Chicago in the weeks before Kennedy was actually assassinated in Dallas. Vallee was a right-wing extremist and member of the John Birch Society. His landlady found newspaper clippings of JFK covering his wall two days before Kennedy was set to visit Chicago. She called the Chicago PD who in turn called the Secret Service. The next day Vallee told his landlady that he was to leave the following day, the day Kennedy was to be in Chicago. An all-points bulletin was sent out which led to him being pulled over for a minor traffic violation. A knife, an M1 rifle and over a thousand rounds of ammunition were discovered in his car.

=== Richard Nixon ===
- April 13, 1972: 21-year-old Arthur Bremer of Milwaukee, Wisconsin carried a firearm to a motorcade in Ottawa, Canada, intending to shoot Nixon, but the president's car went by too fast for Bremer to get a good shot. The next day, Bremer thought he saw Nixon's car outside of the Centre Block, but it had disappeared by the time he could retrieve his gun from his hotel room. A month later, Bremer instead shot and seriously injured the governor of Alabama, George Wallace, who was paralyzed from the waist down until his death in 1998. Three other people were wounded. Bremer served 35 years in prison.
- February 22, 1974: 44-year-old Samuel Byck of Philadelphia, Pennsylvania planned to kill Nixon by crashing a commercial airliner into the White House. He hijacked a DC-9 at Baltimore-Washington International Airport after killing a Maryland Aviation Administration police officer, and was told that it could not take off with the wheel blocks still in place. After he shot both pilots (one later died), an officer named Charles 'Butch' Troyer shot Byck through the plane's door window. He survived long enough to kill himself by shooting.

=== Gerald Ford ===
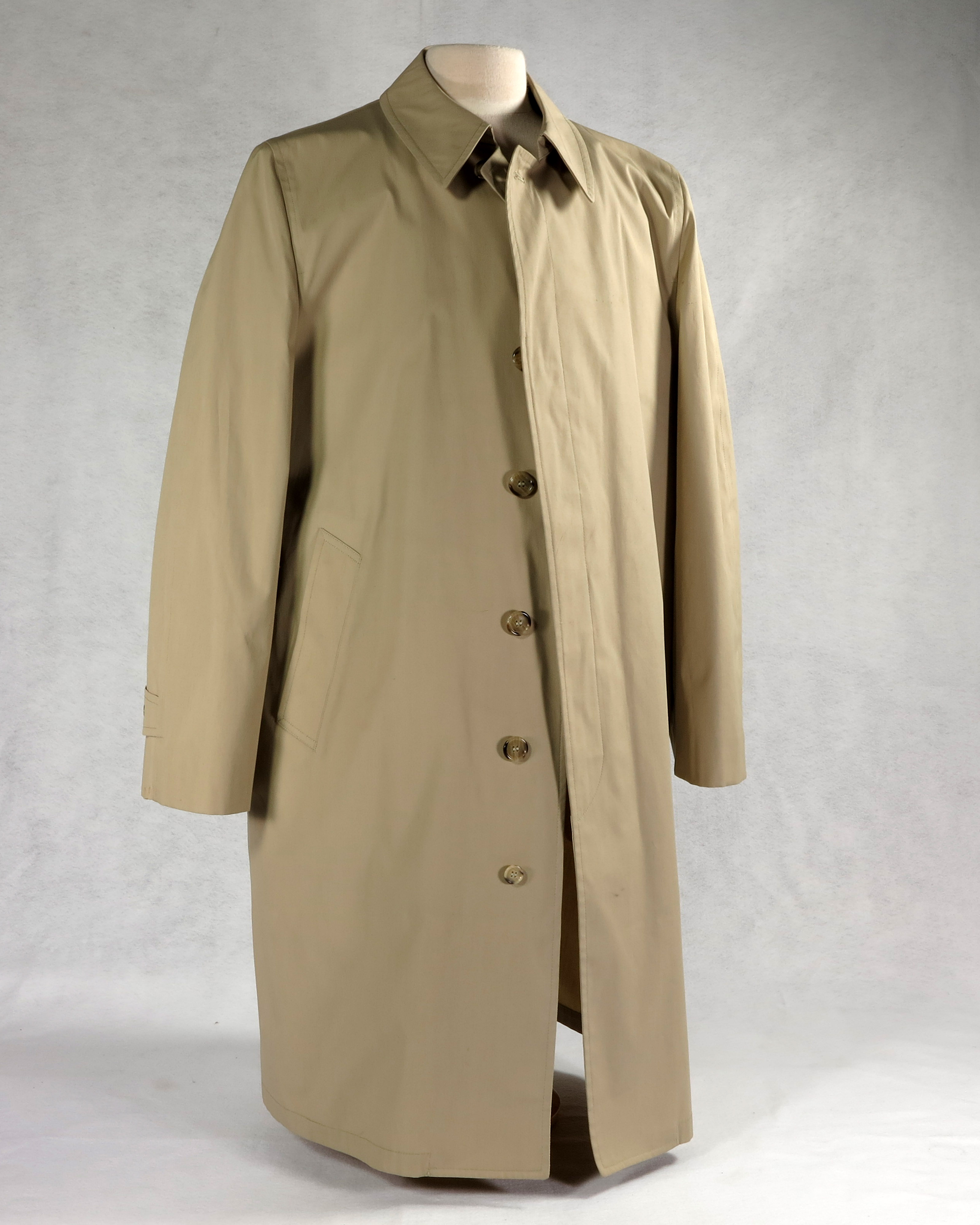
The bulletproof trenchcoat that Ford began wearing in public in October 1975 following his assassination attempt in San Francisco

- Mid-August 1974: Muharem Kurbegovic, also known as The Alphabet Bomber, said in a message that he was going to come to Washington, D.C., and throw a nerve gas bomb at President Gerald Ford, then just ten days into his presidency. Within one day, the CIA, the U.S. Secret Service, and other law enforcement agencies, working out of the White House basement, identified Kurbegovich; he was arrested on August 20. The group had identified his Yugoslav origins, using a CIA voice analysis of his tapes, with court records of the cases handled by his first targets—the judge and the police commissioners—triangulating his identity. Kurbegovic was arrested in 1974 and was sentenced to life imprisonment in 1980.
- September 5, 1975: On the northern grounds of the California State Capitol in Sacramento, Lynette "Squeaky" Fromme, a follower of Charles Manson, drew a Colt M1911 .45-caliber pistol on Ford when he reached to shake her hand in a crowd. She had four cartridges in the pistol's magazine but none in the chamber, and as a result, the gun did not fire. She was quickly restrained by Secret Service agent Larry Buendorf. Fromme was sentenced to life in prison, but was released from custody on August 14, 2009 (two years and eight months after Ford's natural death in 2006).
- September 22, 1975: In San Francisco, California, only 17 days after Fromme's attempt, Sara Jane Moore fired a revolver at Ford from 40 feet (12 m) away. A bystander, Oliver Sipple, grabbed Moore's arm and the shot missed Ford, striking a building wall and slightly injuring taxi driver John Ludwig. Moore was tried and convicted in federal court, and sentenced to prison for life. She was paroled from a federal prison on December 31, 2007, after serving more than 30 years—one year and five days after Ford's natural death. Moore died in 2025, aged 95.

=== George H. W. Bush ===
- April 13, 1993: According to Kuwaiti authorities, and an FBI investigation fourteen Kuwaiti and Iraqi men believed to be working for Saddam Hussein smuggled bombs into Kuwait, planning to assassinate former President George H. W. Bush by a car bomb during his visit to Kuwait University three months after he had left office in January 1993. The former president was on a visit to Kuwait in 1993 to commemorate the coalition's victory over Iraq in the Persian Gulf War when Kuwaiti officials claimed to have foiled an alleged assassination plot and arrested the suspects. At the time the former president was accompanied by his wife, two of his sons, former Secretary of State James Baker, former Chief of Staff John Sununu, and former Treasury Secretary Nicholas Brady. Of the 17 people Kuwaiti authorities arrested, two suspects, Wali Abdelhadi Ghazali, and Raad Abdel-Amir al-Assadi, retracted their confessions at the trial, claiming that they were coerced. A Kuwaiti court convicted all but one of the defendants. Then-president Bill Clinton responded by launching a cruise missile attack on an Iraqi intelligence building in the Mansour district of Baghdad. The plot was used as one of the justifications for the Iraq Resolution by Bush's son, George, who had succeeded Clinton as president, authorizing the 2003 U.S. invasion of the country. An analysis by the CIA's Counterterrorism Center concludes the assassination plot was likely fabricated by Kuwaiti authorities; however, at the time the FBI established that the plot had been directed by the Iraqi Intelligence Service (IIS), and the CIA had received information suggesting that Saddam Hussein had authorized the assassination attempt to get revenge against the U.S., to punish Kuwait for working with the U.S., and to keep other Arab states for intervening in Iraq any further. The day before the attack, on April 12, 1993, the then U.S. Ambassador to the U.N. and future 64th U.S. secretary of state, Madeleine Albright, went before the U.N. Security Council to present evidence of the Iraqi plot with the hope of gaining international support.

=== Bill Clinton ===
- January 21, 1994: Ronald Gene Barbour, a retired military officer and freelance writer, plotted to kill Clinton while the president was jogging. Barbour returned to Florida a week later without having fired the shots at the president, who was on a state visit to Russia. Barbour was sentenced to five years in prison and was released in 1998.
- October 29, 1994: Francisco Martin Duran fired at least 29 shots with a 7.62×39mm SKS semi-automatic rifle at the White House from a fence overlooking the North Lawn, thinking that Clinton was among the men in dark suits standing there (Clinton was inside). Three tourists, Harry Rakosky, Ken Davis and Robert Haines, tackled Duran before he could injure anyone. Found to have a suicide note in his pocket, Duran was sentenced to 40 years in prison.
- November 1994: Osama bin Laden recruited Ramzi Yousef, the mastermind of the 1993 World Trade Center bombing, to attempt to assassinate Clinton. However, believing that security would be too effective, Yousef had abandoned the plot, and instead decided to target Pope John Paul II as part of the failed Bojinka plot.
- November 24, 1996: During his visit to the Asia-Pacific Economic Cooperation (APEC) forum in Manila, Clinton's motorcade was rerouted before it was to drive over a bridge. Secret Service officers had intercepted a message suggesting that an attack was imminent, and Lewis Merletti, the director of the Secret Service, ordered the motorcade to be re-routed. An intelligence team later discovered a bomb under the bridge. Subsequent U.S. investigation "revealed that [the plot] was masterminded by a Saudi terrorist living in Afghanistan named Osama bin Laden."
- October 2018: A package containing a pipe bomb addressed to his wife Hillary Clinton and sent to their home in Chappaqua, New York, was intercepted by the Secret Service. It was one of several mailed to other Democratic leaders in the same week, including former president Barack Obama. Bill Clinton was at the Chappaqua home when the package was intercepted, while Hillary was in Florida campaigning for Democrats in the 2018 midterm elections. Fingerprint DNA revealed that the package was sent by Florida resident Cesar Sayoc, who was captured two days after the package was intercepted. Prosecutors sought a life sentence for Sayoc, but the judge instead sentenced him to 20 years.

=== George W. Bush ===
- May 10, 2005: While President Bush was giving a speech in the Freedom Square in Tbilisi, Georgia, Vladimir Arutyunian threw a live Soviet-made RGD-5 hand grenade toward the podium. The grenade had its pin pulled, but did not explode because a red tartan handkerchief was wrapped tightly around it, preventing the safety lever from detaching. After escaping that day, Arutyunian was arrested in July 2005. During his arrest, he killed an Interior Ministry agent. He was convicted in January 2006 and given a life sentence.
- May 24, 2022: Shihab Ahmed Shihab Shihab, an Iraqi citizen and resident of Columbus, Ohio, was arrested for involvement in a plot to assassinate former President Bush based on information obtained from conversations he held with several undercover FBI informants. He was also accused of committing an immigration crime and planning to illegally smuggle Iraqi nationals into the U.S. from Mexico in order to assist with the plot. He additionally claimed to informants that he had direct connections to members of the former ISIS, including ones to former ISIS leader Abu Bakr Al-Baghdadi (before his death) and a former ISIS financial chief, the latter of whom he intended to launder money from into the U.S. via a Columbus car dealership. In February, Shihab and an informant traveled to the Bush home in Dallas, Texas, and to the George W. Bush Institute to conduct surveillance. Shihab entered the country illegally in September 2020 with false identification. Shihab claimed to have worked with Iraqi terrorists to kill many American servicemen in Iraq from 2003 to 2006 following the invasion. He stated that the motivation behind the assassination plot was anger over the Iraq War. In March 2023, Shihab pleaded guilty in attempting to provide material support to a terrorist organization and in the February 2024 he was sentenced to 14 years and 10 months in prison.

=== Barack Obama ===
- December 2008: A United States Marine, 20-year-old Kody Ray Brittingham, stationed at Camp Lejeune, wrote that he had taken an oath to "protect against all enemies, both foreign and domestic." In a signed "letter of intent", he identified President-elect Obama as a "domestic enemy" and the target of Brittingham's planned assassination plot. A search of his barracks uncovered a journal containing white supremacist material. In June 2010, Brittingham was sentenced to 8 years and 4 months in federal prison.
- April 2009: A plot to assassinate Obama at the Alliance of Civilizations summit in Istanbul, Turkey, was discovered after a man of Syrian origins carrying forged Al Jazeera TV press credentials was found. The man confessed to the Turkish security services details of his plan to kill Obama with a knife. He alleged that he had three accomplices.
- May 2011: Irish Islamist militant Khalid Kelly was arrested for threatening to assassinate Barack Obama. In an interview with the Sunday Mirror he said that al-Qaeda was likely to kill Obama on his upcoming trip to Ireland. He reportedly said he would like to do it himself, but was too well known. He stated, "Personally I would feel happy if Obama was killed. How could I not feel happy when a big enemy of Islam is gone?"
- November 2011: 21-year-old Oscar Ramiro Ortega-Hernandez was influenced by conspiracy theories and fringe religious viewpoints to attempt to murder Obama. Having traveled from his native Idaho, he hit the White House with several rounds fired from a semi-automatic rifle. No one was injured, but a window was broken. He was sentenced to 25 years in prison.
- 2011 to 2012: The far-right terrorist group FEAR plotted to carry out a series of terror attacks which included assassinating Obama. The plot was foiled when four members of the group were arrested on murder charges and one, Michael Burnett, agreed to co-operate with authorities in return for a lighter sentence.
- October 2012: A mentally ill man named Mitchell Kusick of Westminster, Colorado, was arrested after confessing to his therapist that he intended to kill Obama with a shotgun at a campaign stop in Boulder, Colorado.
- April 15, 2013: A Tupelo, Mississippi man named James Everett Dutschke sent a letter laced with the toxin ricin to Obama. On May 13, 2014, he was sentenced to 25 years in prison.
- May 2013: Ricin-laced letters were sent to Obama and New York City mayor Michael Bloomberg vowing to kill anyone who tried to take away the sender's guns. The letters in this case were sent by actress Shannon Richardson, who tried to frame her husband Nathan for the crime.
- June 2013: Two white supremacists, Glendon Scott Crawford of Galway, New York, and Eric Feight of Hudson, New York, were arrested for a plot to kill Muslim Americans with a homemade "radiation gun", described by Crawford as "Hiroshima on a light switch." It later emerged that Crawford had suggested using the device against President Obama as well as several other targets.
- February 2015: Three men from New York City were arrested by the FBI after telling undercover agents about their plans to kill Obama and join the Islamic State of Iraq and the Levant.
- October 2018: A package sent by Brooklyn, New York native Cesar Sayoc Jr. that contained a pipe bomb was sent to former President Obama at his home in Washington, D.C. The package was intercepted by the Secret Service.
- April 2019: Larry Mitchell Hopkins, a member of the United Constitutional Patriots militia, was arrested on April 20 after he allegedly confessed that his militia was training for a planned assassination of Obama and Hillary Clinton.
- June 29, 2023: 37-year-old Taylor Taranto of Pasco, Washington, who participated in the January 6 Capitol attack, was arrested near the home of Obama in Washington, D.C., with weapons and explosive-making materials.

=== Donald Trump ===
- June 18, 2016: Michael Steven Sanford, a 20-year-old man and United Kingdom citizen from Dorking, Surrey, attempted to draw an officer's pistol during a Las Vegas rally to fire at Trump. Sanford was released after 11 months of imprisonment.
- September 6, 2017: Gregory Lee Leingang, a 42-year-old man from Bismarck, North Dakota, attempted to assassinate President Donald Trump in Mandan, North Dakota, while Trump was visiting the state to rally public support. Leingang stole a forklift from an oil refinery and drove toward the presidential motorcade. After the forklift became jammed within the refinery, he fled on foot and was arrested by the pursuing police. While interviewed in detention, he admitted his intent to murder the president by flipping the presidential limousine with the stolen forklift, to the surprise of authorities, who suspected he was merely stealing the vehicle for personal use. The man pleaded guilty to the attempted attack, stealing the forklift, related charges, and several other unrelated crimes on the same day. Consequently, he was sentenced to 20 years in prison. His defense attorney noted a "serious psychiatric crisis".
- November 2017: A man affiliated with Islamic State (IS), whose name was not revealed, was arrested by the Philippine National Police in Rizal Park, Manila, for reportedly planning to assassinate Trump during the diplomatic ASEAN Summit. In the week prior to the failed killing, the Secret Service already suspected a planned assault on the president because of the general presence of IS in the Philippines and because of threats by many people against the president on social media. Before the landing of Trump's airplane, the Secret Service discovered a credible terrorist threat from a man who threatened to kill the president on social media, quickly tracking down and arresting the terrorist. The government disclosed the incident to the public, after a year of silence, in a television documentary.
- October 1, 2018: An envelope laced with ricin was sent to Trump before being discovered by mailing facilities. Several other letters were sent to the Pentagon, all of them labeled on the front with "Jack and the Missile Bean Stock Powder". Two days later on October 3, a 39-year-old Logan, Utah resident and Utah Navy veteran named William Clyde Allen III was arrested and charged with one count of mailing a threat against the president and five counts of mailing threatening communications to an officer or an employee of the United States. Allen pleaded not guilty to all charges.
- September 2020: Letters containing the poison ricin and addressed to Donald Trump were intercepted by the Secret Service before delivery to the White House. Canadian woman Pascale Ferrier had sent the letters from Canada and was subsequently arrested while attempting to cross the Canadian border into the United States while possessing a firearm and ammunition. Ferrier was sentenced to 22 years in prison for the poisoned letters, which she had also sent to law enforcement officials in Texas. She described herself as a peaceful activist, claiming "The only regret I have is that it didn't work and that I couldn't stop Trump."
- October 2020: It was reported that Barry Croft Jr., a Bear, Delaware man who was arrested for his involvement in the kidnapping plot against Michigan Governor Gretchen Whitmer, included Trump in a list of politicians he wanted to kill by hanging. In December 2022, Croft was sentenced to 19 years in prison.
- July 12, 2024: A Pakistani man named Asif Merchant, reported to be an agent of the Islamic Revolutionary Guard Corps, was arrested for a plot to kill Trump at a rally. Adrienne Watson, a spokesperson for the U.S. National Security Council, said that the plot was believed to be in revenge for the assassination of Qasem Soleimani. Merchant paid $5,000 to federal agents posing as hired assassins and told them they would receive their instructions after he had left the country. Merchant was arrested in Houston, Texas, on July 12, just before attempting to leave the United States. On March 6, 2026, he was found guilty of murder-for-hire and terrorism-related charges related to the plot. He faces a potential life sentence.
- July 19, 2024: 68-year-old Michael Martin Wiseman of Palm Beach, Florida was arrested for threatening to kill Trump alongside his running mate, JD Vance, on Facebook. Wiseman also threatened the lives of their families, particularly to sexually assault their daughters. By December 12, Wiseman was found guilty and sentenced to 18 months of probation.

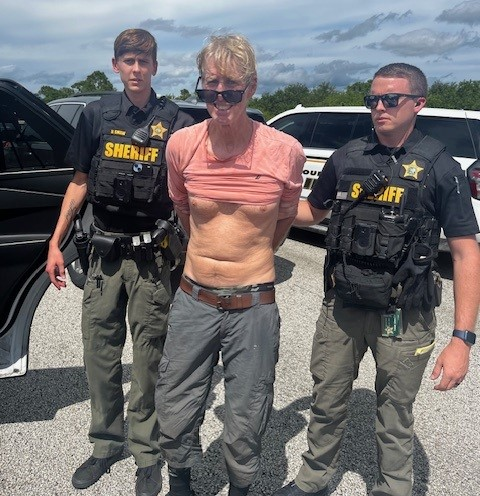
Ryan Routh's arrest following his assassination attempt on Donald Trump

- September 15, 2024: 58-year-old Ryan Wesley Routh, a roofer and Russo-Ukrainian war activist from Greensboro, North Carolina, was spotted holding an SKS-style rifle on a private golf course belonging to Trump in West Palm Beach, Florida. After 12 hours of hiding in shrubbery, Routh had his weapon pointed through the fence line of the golf course, 300–500 yards away from Trump. A Secret Service agent noticed this and fired four rounds towards Routh, who then dropped his weapon and fled the scene. After a short police chase, he was stopped and detained without resistance. He was indicted on a total of 5 federal counts and 3 state counts, all of which he pleaded not guilty to. On September 23, 2025, he was found guilty on all federal counts. On February 4, 2026, he was sentenced to life in prison without the possibility of parole. Two conspirators who helped Routh obtain the rifle were also later arrested and charged.
- September 2024: According to a criminal complaint filed by the Department of Justice, an Iranian official had ordered their agent, 51-year-old Farjad Shakeri, Afghanistan native, to formulate a plan to kill Trump before the election. But according to a complaint, Shakeri unable to formulate a plan in the shortest time and therefore he switched to implementing a more formulated plan to kill another target, Iranian dissident 47-year-old Masih Alinejad. For kill the second target, Shakeri hired two U.S. national, 49-year-old Carlisle Rivera of Brooklyn, New York, and 36-year-old Jonathan Loadholt of Staten Island, New York, and in the course of implementing this plan, both of them were arrested and charged with murder-for-hire, conspiracy to commit murder-for-hire, and money laundering conspiracy. Shakeri, who was not arrested, was indicted on the basis of his own FBI testimony and the testimony of his arrested accomplices in both the Alinejad and Trump cases in the providing material support to a foreign terrorist organization, conspiring to provide material support to a foreign terrorist organization, murder-for hire, conspiracy to commit murder-for-hire, money laundering conspiracy, and conspiracy to violate the International Emergency Economic Powers Act and sanctions against the Government of Iran. Later, Rivera pleaded guilty in conspiracy to commit murder-for-hire and conspiracy to commit stalking, for which he was sentenced in January 2026 to 15 years in prison, and Loadholt pleaded guilty in conspiracy to commit stalking and conspiracy to commit money laundering, for which he was sentenced in May 2026 to 10 years in prison. Meanwhile, Shakeri has not yet been arrested and is believed he is hiding in Iran.
- February 11, 2025: 17-year-old Nikita Casap, a Moldova native and a follower of the Order of Nine Angles, shot and killed his mother, 35-year-old Tatiana Casap, and his stepfather, 51-year-old Donald Mayer in Waukesha, Wisconsin. Casap was accused of living with their corpses for two weeks. He was arrested on February 28 after running a stop sign while driving his stepfather's car in WaKeeney, Kansas, 800 miles away from his Wisconsin home. The car contained his stepfather's Smith & Wesson .357 Magnum revolver, the victims' driver's licenses and spent shell casings. Casap had planned on fleeing the country and living in exile in Ukraine. He was also accused of plotting to assassinate President Trump in order to "instigate a race war and sow chaos", and allegedly killed his parents in order to acquire their money to fund the plot. On January 8, 2026, Casap pleaded guilty to two counts of first-degree intentional homicide. On March 5, 2026, he was sentenced to life in prison without the possibility of parole.
- April 11, 2025: 32-year-old Shawn Monper was arrested by the FBI for posting multiple threats to assassinate Donald Trump on social media. Since Trump took office in 2025, Monper had bought several guns and ammunition, preparing to commit a mass shooting. Monper was living in Butler, Pennsylvania at the time, the city where Trump's Pennsylvania assassination attempt took place in 2024. On May 2, Monper was charged with 4 counts of threatening to murder a U.S official to impede their official duties. On April 13, 2026, Monper pleaded guilty to 2 counts of threatening to murder a U.S official, and on September 1, he was sentence to 4 years in prison and 3 years of supervised release.
- May 1, 2025: 35-year-old Richard James Spring of Grand Rapids, Michigan was arrested after he threatened on social media a few months earlier to rape someone in front of Trump before shooting him in the head. On June 12, Spring pleaded guilty to one count of threatening to kill and injure the president, and on October 20, he was sentenced to 18 months in prison and to pay a $2,000 fine. Additionally, he was required to undergo mental health and anger management counseling, as well as substance abuse programming while in prison.
- June 11, 2025: 67-year-old James Donald Vance Jr. of Grand Rapids, Michigan was arrested for threatening to kill Donald Trump, JD Vance, Elon Musk, and Donald Trump Jr. through the social media platform Bluesky. In one post, he claimed he did not care whether he was shot by the Secret Service or spend the rest of his life in prison for doing so. Four months later on November 17, he was convicted and sentenced to two years in prison.
- August 2025: Nathalie Rose Jones, a 50-year-old mentally ill woman from Lafayette, Indiana, posted on social media that she intended to kidnap and disembowel Trump with Liz Cheney there to witness it, while referencing the 1981 science fiction novel The Affirmation. She was arrested and charged with making violent threats against Trump. Jones claimed she was motivated to kill Trump due to her disagreement with Trump's COVID-19 policies during his first term.
- February 22, 2026: Austin Tucker Martin, a 21-year-old man from Moore County, North Carolina, snuck past security at Mar-a-Lago, a residence of President Trump, armed with a 12-gauge Winchester SXP Defender pump-action shotgun and gasoline. He was shot and killed by Secret Service agents shortly after entering the property.

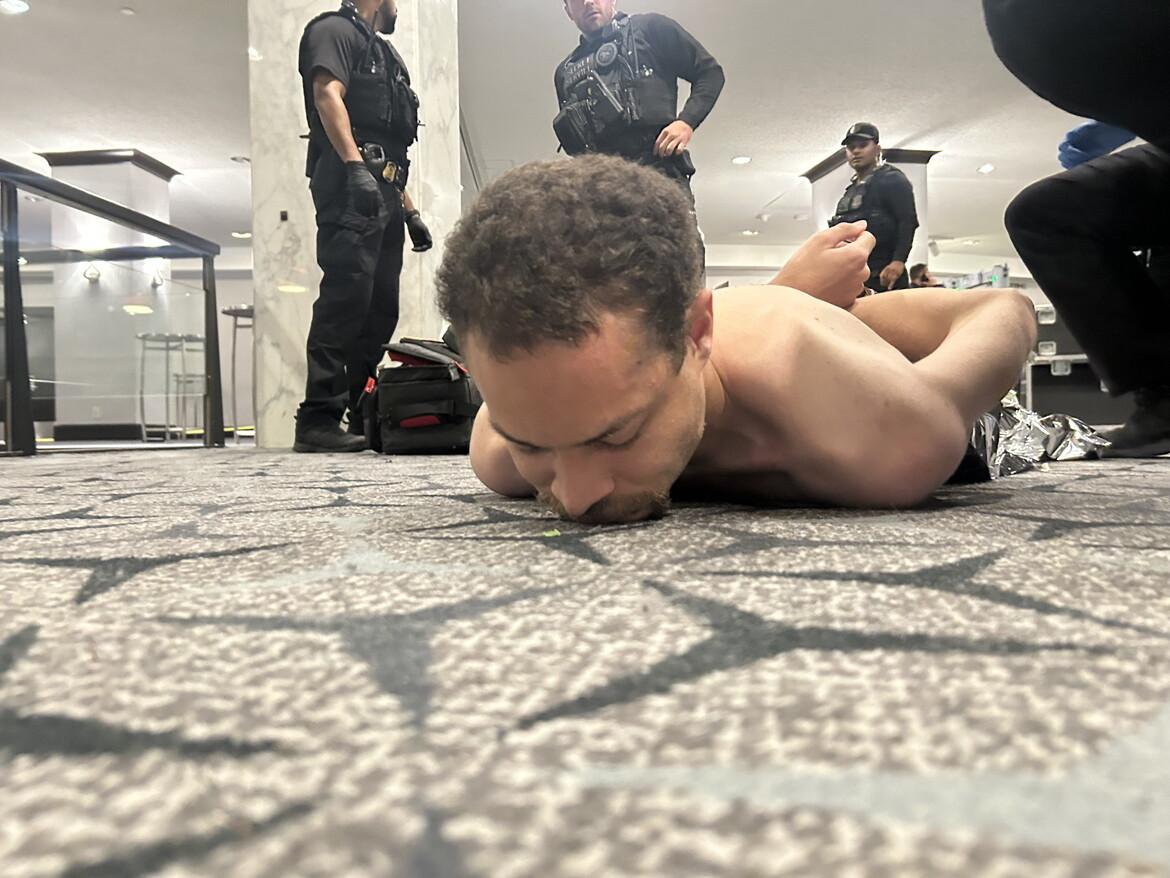
Cole Allen after his arrest, lying face down on the ground shirtless, with his hands cuffed behind his back, and surrounded by Secret Service agents

- April 25, 2026: 31-year-old Cole Tomas Allen, an academic tutor and video game developer from Torrance, California, allegedly ran past the security checkpoint at the Washington Hilton Hotel during the annual White House Correspondents' Dinner, and fired one shot hitting a Secret Service agent who was wearing a bulletproof vest in the process. He tripped and fell to the ground before he could reach the ballroom, where he was immediately subdued, arrested, and taken into custody. Trump and those in the banquet hall were all immediately evacuated. Authorities later announced that Trump and other administration officials were targeted, based on Allen's alleged manifesto. He was charged with attempting to assassinate Trump.
- April 30, 2026: A car wash facility located in Apex, North Carolina, was evacuated after a witness noticed an SUV parked in front of the facility with threats against Trump written on the driver's side window, one of which claimed the driver was on his way to Washington D.C. to kill him. The witness immediately called the police, where a bomb squad arrived to evacuate the facility. The driver, identified as 41-year-old Daniel Rodney Swain of Summerville, South Carolina, was arrested and charged with resisting a public officer, possession of methamphetamine, and using a fake license plate.
- November 5th, 2026: A suspicious vehicle parked near the White House was approached by a Secret Service agent shortly before midnight. When awoken, 28-year-old driver Ronny Yordrix Guanipa Chrinos surrendered, turned over three guns, and confessed to hearing voices in his head telling him to kill the president.

=== Joe Biden ===
- May 22, 2023: Sai Varshith Kandula, a 19-year-old man from Chesterfield, Missouri (near St. Louis), drove a rented box truck into a barrier that separated the White House grounds from the public. Shortly thereafter he was taken into custody by the United States Park Police and was found to have a Nazi flag in his truck. Kandula expressed admiration for the Third Reich and stated his intentions were to "kill the president" and "seize power". On January 16, 2025, he was sentenced to eight years in prison.
- August 9, 2023: Craig DeLeeuw Robertson, a 74-year old resident of Provo, Utah, had threatened on social media to assassinate Joe Biden with an M24 sniper rifle during Biden's visit to Utah. A warrant was issued for his arrest and FBI agents raided his residence. DeLeeuw was ultimately shot and killed during the raid.
- June 27, 2024: 23-year-old Adam Benjamin Hall of Alabama allegedly plotted to ambush and kill Biden during the 2024 presidential debate, but failed to gain access to the event after attending the wrong venue. He was arrested and charged with interstate stalking.

== Deaths rumored to have been assassinations ==
=== Zachary Taylor ===
On July 9, 1850, President Zachary Taylor died from an illness that was diagnosed as cholera morbus, which allegedly came after eating cherries and milk at a 4th of July celebration. Almost immediately after his death, rumors began to circulate that Taylor was poisoned by pro-slavery Southerners, and similar theories have persisted into the 21st century. In 1991, a neutron activation analysis conducted on samples of Taylor's remains found no evidence of poisonings due to insufficient levels of arsenic.

=== Warren G. Harding ===
In June 1923, President Warren G. Harding set out on a cross-country Voyage of Understanding, planning to meet with citizens and explain his policies. During this trip, he became the first president to visit Alaska, which was then a U.S. territory. Rumors of corruption in the Harding administration were beginning to circulate in Washington, D.C., by 1923, and Harding was profoundly shocked by a long message he received while in Alaska, apparently detailing illegal activities by his own cabinet that were allegedly unknown to him. At the end of July, while traveling south from Alaska through British Columbia, he developed what was thought to be a severe case of food poisoning. He gave his last speech to a large crowd at the University of Washington Stadium (now Husky Stadium) at the University of Washington campus in Seattle, Washington. A scheduled speech in Portland, Oregon, was canceled. The president's train proceeded south to San Francisco. Upon arriving at the Palace Hotel, he developed pneumonia. Harding died in his hotel room of either a heart attack or a stroke at 7:35 PM on August 2, 1923. The formal announcement, printed in The New York Times of that day, stated: "A stroke of apoplexy was the cause of death." He had been ill exactly one week.

Naval physicians surmised that Harding had suffered a heart attack. The Hardings' personal medical advisor, homeopath and Surgeon General Charles E. Sawyer, disagreed with the diagnosis. His wife Florence Harding refused permission for an autopsy, which soon led to speculation that he had been the victim of a plot, possibly carried out by Florence, as he apparently had been unfaithful to her. Gaston Means, an amateur historian and gadfly, noted in his book The Strange Death of President Harding (1930) that the circumstances surrounding his death led to suspicions that he had been poisoned. A number of individuals attached to him, both personally and politically, would have welcomed Harding's death, as they would have been disgraced in association by Means' assertion of Harding's "imminent impeachment".

== See also ==
- Assassins, a musical about presidential assassins and assassination attempters
- Attempted assassination of George Wallace, Democratic presidential candidate, on May 15, 1972
- Attempted assassination of Thomas R. Marshall, vice president, on July 2, 1915
- Curse of Tippecanoe, supposed pattern of certain presidents dying while in office
- Kennedy curse
- List of assassinated and executed heads of state and government
- List of incidents of political violence in Washington, D.C.
- List of White House security breaches
- List of presidents of the United States who died in office
- List of assassinated American politicians
- List of United States vice presidential assassination attempts and plots
