= Security incidents involving Recep Tayyip Erdoğan =

Assassination attempts and threats against Turkish politician, Recep Tayyip Erdoğan

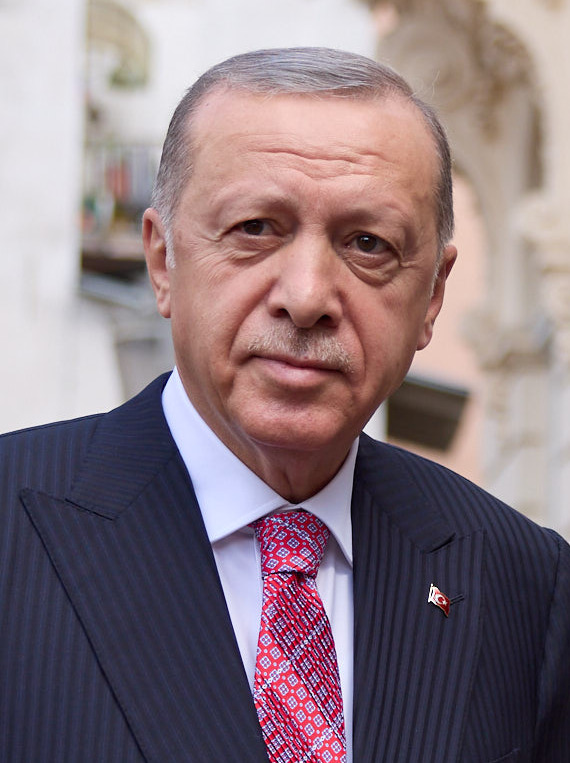
Recep Tayyip Erdoğan in 2022

Recep Tayyip Erdoğan, the 12th president of Turkey, was involved in multiple security incidents, including several assassination threats and plots, starting from when he became a prime minister in 2003. Some of the threats were extended to members of Erdoğan's family

== 2003 ==
=== Wedding incident ===
Members of the Revolutionary People's Liberation Party/Front (DHKP-C) were preparing to assassinate Prime Minister Recep Tayyip Erdoğan during the wedding of his son Bilal Erdoğan. The militants captured in both operations did not give information in their statements. However, during the technical follow-up, it was understood that the action targeted Prime Minister Erdoğan. Information that alarmed the Istanbul police came about the wedding of Erdoğan's son Bilal Erdoğan on August 10. DHKP-C was preparing for an action in line with the encrypted messages sent to the pocket computers of the members of the organization from abroad. One team would scan the convoy with machine guns, and the other team would carry out a suicide attack on the wedding as a suicide bomber.

== 2005 ==
=== Kütahya incident ===
Prime Minister Erdoğan, who went to Kütahya on September 12, 2005, to open the new academic year, was approached by gunman Mustafa Bağdat. Bağdat said "we had five martyrs yesterday", and was determined for an assassination attempt and was taken into custody. During the interrogation of Mustafa Bağdat, who was taken to the police station, it was revealed that he had hidden a gun in a bread bag. In his statement, Bağdat stated that he went to Kütahya with the intention of killing the Prime Minister, that he was an idealist, and said, "I approached Prime Minister Erdoğan by two or three meters. I took out the gun from the bread. Just as I was about to shoot, first an old man and then the bodyguard of the Prime Minister blocked the path". Evaluating the incident, Prime Minister Erdoğan said that "those who enter political life are used to this". He also said that "there may be some ignorant people. These are people who cannot understand democracy."

== 2011 ==
=== Ambush by PKK ===
Police teams that went to Kastamonu for Prime Minister Recep Tayyip Erdoğan's rally were attacked with guns while they were on their way back to Ankara. One police officer died in the incident; It was announced that another was injured. Prime Minister Erdoğan was not in the convoy because he preferred to go by helicopter. According to the statement, when they arrived at the Ilgaz Mountain Soğuksu location, unidentified people opened fire from inside the forest at the police escort going approximately 50–60 meters in front of the campaign bus of Erdogan. After the attack, a hand grenade was thrown at the police vehicle and the vehicle began to burn. It was reported that the deceased police officer was in the burning vehicle, while the other police officer escaped from the attack and took shelter in the campaign bus.

=== Şırnak rally ===
Before Prime Minister Tayyip Erdoğan's Şırnak rally on May 24, a bomb was defused on the 36th kilometer of the Nusaybin Cizre highway. It was determined that 5.5 kilometers of cable was laid on the road to prevent the bomb from being affected by the Jammer shield. As a result of a village guard's tip, the Şırnak Gendarmerie Command Bomb Disposal team defused the explosive.

== 2013 ==
=== Tugrul Bayir ===
In 2013, a 53-year-old man was arrested at Prime Minister Erdogan's office with a fake bomb. Five minutes before his arrival, he had called the police to say a suicide attack was about to take place. Shortly afterwards he was arrested. Two warning shots were fired. Images show that the man had a foil-wrapped material with him, from which a wire came out that was connected to a time switch. Interior Minister Muammer Guler said the man had "psychological problems".

== 2014 ==
=== Ferhat Yıldız ===
On May 31, 2014, a person named Ferhat Yıldız tried to shoot Prime Minister Erdogan from close range as he left a rally of his AK Party. Yıldız pulled the trigger, but the gun didn't go off. Bodyguards were able to prevent Yıldız from taking another shot at Erdogan. In the indictment, Ferhat Yıldız was requested to be imprisoned for the crimes of "premeditated attempt to kill a person due to his public duty" and "purchasing, carrying or possessing unlicensed firearms and bullets".

== 2016 ==
=== July 15 coup attempt ===
Dozens of people were charged with attempted murder and violation of the constitution as part of the 2016 Turkish coup attempt. They were accused of attacking a hotel in the resort city of Marmaris where Erdogan was staying on the night of the coup. Two policemen were killed. Three of the suspects were tried in absentia. According to the Turkish news agency DHA, one of them was the US-based cleric Fethullah Gülen, whom Erdogan held primarily responsible for the attempted coup.

== 2017 ==
=== Plot by DHKP-C ===
The Greek newspaper To Vima published an article that nine members from Revolutionary People's Liberation Party/Front (DHKP-C) were plotting to attack President Recep Tayyip Erdoğan during his visit to Greece. Weapons and plans for the attack were found in homes raided by the Greeks police on November 28. They had a plan to assassinate the president with rocket guns, grenades and Molotov cocktails. Erdoğan was codenamed “scorpion” in the plan. Two groups of terrorists were to attack Erdoğan's convoy from the side with rocket launchers as they passed, while a third group would attack the vehicles from the rear.

== 2021 ==
=== Explosive device ===
An explosive device was discovered beneath a police vehicle securing a rally of president Erdoğan in Siirt. The device was discovered just moments before the rally began. A Turkish police bomb disposal crew located the device and dismantled it.

== See also ==
- Threatening the president of the United States
- Security incidents involving Mahathir Mohamad
