= Security incidents involving Barack Obama =

Obama's official portrait

Barack Obama, the 44th president of the United States, was involved in multiple security incidents, including several assassination threats and plots, beginning when he became a presidential candidate in 2007. Secret Service protection for Obama began after he received a death threat in 2007, while serving as the junior United States senator from Illinois and running for president. This marked the earliest time a candidate received such protection before being nominated. Security was increased early for Obama due to fears of possible assassination attempts by white supremacist or other racist groups or individuals against the first African American major party presidential nominee.

Some of the threats were extended to members of Obama's family, including former First Lady Michelle Obama. Obama and his officials generally declined to discuss death threats against him during the presidential race. Some commentators suggested the unusually high number of death threats targeting Obama are at least partially tied to the use of racist imagery and words by some of Obama's critics to describe him. In 2009 journalist Ronald Kessler reported that Obama received 400 percent more death threats than his predecessor. However, later that year the Secret Service stated that the volume of threats against Obama was "comparable to that under George W. Bush and Bill Clinton."

== 2008 ==
=== North Carolina Waffle House threats ===
Jerry Blanchard, an accountant from Charlotte, North Carolina, was indicted for verbally threatening to kill Obama, while dining at a Charlotte-area Waffle House on July 15, 2008. Two customers said Blanchard told them, "Obama and his wife are never going to make it to the White House. He needs to be taken out and I can do it in a heartbeat." The customers contacted the Secret Service, who questioned Blanchard. He denied making the threats, but allegedly told the Secret Service agents he believed Obama was the Antichrist prophesied in the Bible. The Secret Service later received a report from an employee of the Crowne Plaza Hotel in Charlotte, where Blanchard was overheard in the lobby restroom speaking on his cellphone, "I'll get a sniper rifle and take care of it myself. Somebody's got to do it ... We both know Obama is the anti-Christ." Blanchard had claimed he would buy a sniper rifle and pistol from the Hyatt Gun Shop in Charlotte. The gun shop owner said that Blanchard had visited the store but did not buy any weapons. Blanchard was taken into custody on felony charges of making threats against a major candidate for president, and for a psychiatric evaluation. How much evidence existed that he planned to go through with an assassination attempt was questioned; later, according to a federal affidavit, it was determined that there was no proof of any furtherance of his crime. In June 2009, Blanchard was sentenced to one year and one day in prison for making the threats. He was also fined $3,000 and ordered to be under supervised release for three years following his prison term.

=== Miami bail-bondsman training threats ===
Raymond H. Geisel was charged with making threatening statements against Obama during a bail-bonds training class on July 31, 2008, in Miami, Florida. During the course, Geisel referred to Obama with a racial epithet and said, "If he gets elected, I'll assassinate him myself." Geisel also threatened to put a bullet in the head of then-President Bush, although Geisel later claimed he was joking. In his hotel room, authorities found ammunition, body armor, a combat-style hatchet, tear gas, a loaded 9 mm handgun and four loaded magazines. Geisel said he collected firearms, and was only using the gun for his bail-bonds course. Geisel remained in custody for a month. He pleaded "not guilty" on August 20, 2008. With a trial date set for January 2009, in December 2008 there was discussion of a plea agreement for Geisel, who faced up to 30 years in prison if convicted on all four counts brought against him. In December 2009 Geisel was convicted on weapons charges and served three years' supervised probation stemming from that conviction. The threat charges were dropped as part of his plea agreement.

=== Assassination plot in Denver ===
Three men allegedly discussed shooting Barack Obama, then the 2008 Democratic Party presidential nominee, during his acceptance speech at the 2008 Democratic National Convention in Denver, Colorado. Cousins Tharin Gartrell, Shawn Adolf, as well as their friend Nathan Johnson, allegedly came to Denver specifically to kill Obama, and discussed in their hotel room how they could assassinate him. On August 24, 2008, Gartrell was arrested when police found his truck filled with weapons and narcotics. Johnson and Adolf were arrested shortly thereafter and, during a televised interview, Johnson later indicated Adolf was the one who planned the alleged threat. Authorities later downplayed the threats and indicated the trio had little chance of successfully killing Obama. The three men were charged with drug and weapons charges and sentenced, but did not face federal charges of threatening a presidential candidate.

=== Assassination plot in Tennessee ===
Paul Schlesselman and Daniel Cowart, two men with strong white supremacist beliefs, allegedly planned a murder spree of 88 African-Americans (14 of whom they were planning to behead) in Tennessee, many of whom were to be young students at an unidentified, predominantly African-American school. They allegedly planned to end the spree by driving their vehicle toward Barack Obama as fast as they could and shooting at him from the windows. The two men were arrested on October 22, 2008, after they bragged to their friends about firing shots at a church in Brownsville, Tennessee. Schlesselman and Cowart were in possession of several guns during their arrest, and they allegedly told police they intended to rob a firearms dealer and other stores to secure more weapons for the attack. Both plotters pleaded guilty to various federal charges; Judge J. Daniel Breen of the United States District Court for the Western District of Tennessee sentenced Schlesselman to 10 years imprisonment on April 15, 2010, and Cowart to 14 years in prison on October 22, 2010.

=== Scranton "kill him" threat ===
In October 2008 it was widely reported that someone yelled "Kill him!" at a Scranton, Pennsylvania, Sarah Palin rally when Obama's name was mentioned. The Secret Service denied this claim, but a Scranton Times-Tribune editor said, "We stand by the story. The facts reported are true and that's really all there is." Also, MSNBC clips of McCain rallies, while unclear, appear to show two similar incidents.

=== Maine "dirty bomb" threat ===
On December 9, 2008, 29-year-old James G. Cummings, a wealthy white supremacist, was shot dead by his wife, 31-year-old Amber Cummings, in their Belfast, Maine, home. When police arrived at the scene, they discovered components and instructions for making a dirty bomb and notified the FBI, who sealed off the scene. The FBI discovered four one-gallon containers of 35% hydrogen peroxide, uranium, thorium, lithium metal, thermite, aluminum powder, beryllium, boron, black iron oxide and magnesium ribbon as well as literature on how to build "dirty bombs" and information about cesium-137, strontium-90 and cobalt-60, radioactive materials. Child pornography was also found on his computer. Cummings had connections to various white-supremacist groups, including the US National Socialist Party. According to tradesmen who worked at the home, Cummings idolized Adolf Hitler and openly kept Nazi memorabilia, including flags, displayed around the home. According to his wife, James Cummings was not happy that Obama was elected president, and planned to set off the bomb at his inauguration. She also claimed that her husband was frequently physically, mentally and sexually abusive towards her and their daughter, citing this as her reason for the murder. Amber Cummings pleaded guilty to manslaughter, but was given a suspended 8-year sentence plus six years of probation by Justice Jeffrey Hjelm, who ruled that she would not face prison time due to "extenuating circumstances".

== 2009 ==
=== Hawaii threats against Michelle Obama ===
Kristy Lee Roshia, 35, called the Boston office of the Secret Service on November 10, 2009, and told them she planned to "blow away" First Lady Michelle Obama while the family visited Honolulu, Hawaii, for a Christmas vacation. She also indicated she planned to shoot members of the United States Marine Corps. Roshia told authorities she knew "the exact location" the Obama family would be staying. Information that Roshia provided to the Boston office was consistent with the itinerary of the Obama family at the Secret Service office in Hawaii, and authorities believed Roshia had observed Secret Service agents in the area of the Kailua Beach home where the Obamas had previously stayed. Roshia had a history of calling the Boston office and making threats, and told the agency in 2004 that she intended to assassinate then-President George W. Bush, although she contradictorily added that she had no desire to hurt him. Following her threatening call, Roshia was arrested two miles from the Honolulu house the Obama family had booked for their vacation. She allegedly struck an officer in the face and arms while he tried to detain her. Roshia was charged with threatening a family member of the president and assaulting a federal agent while being arrested. A federal judge ordered Roshia to undergo a mental competency examination. She was held in custody until a subsequent hearing in February 2010. Roshia was transported to a facility in Texas and her competency continued to be evaluated through April 2010. In January 2012, Roshia was sentenced for her crime. She was released from prison on May 28, 2013.

== 2011 ==
=== Khalid Kelly ===
In May 2011, Irish Islamist militant Khalid Kelly was arrested for threatening to assassinate Barack Obama. In an interview with the Sunday Mirror he said that al-Qaeda was likely to kill Obama on his upcoming trip to Ireland. He reportedly said he would like to do it himself, but was too well known. He stated, "Personally I would feel happy if Obama was killed. How could I not feel happy when a big enemy of Islam is gone?"

=== Shots fired at White House ===
On the night of November 11, 2011, Oscar Ramiro Ortega-Hernandez fired a Romanian Cugir semiautomatic rifle from his car parked on Constitution Avenue. At least seven rounds struck the White House, though no one was injured. He was arrested five days later in a hotel in Indiana, Pennsylvania. Obama was not at the White House at the time of the shooting. Federal prosecutors launched an investigation to determine if Hernandez acted out of hatred for Obama. Writings by Hernandez and testimony from those who knew him showed that he believed President Obama was the Antichrist and the Devil. In September 2013, Hernandez pleaded guilty to one count of destruction of property and one count of discharging a firearm during a crime of violence, thereby avoiding the charge of attempting to assassinate the President. Originally scheduled to be sentenced in January 2014, Hernandez's lawyers objected to the "terrorism enhancement" as unconstitutional, though he accepted it as part of his guilty plea. On March 31, 2014, Hernandez was sentenced by Judge Rosemary M. Collyer to a term of 25 years of imprisonment.

== 2012 ==
=== Plot by terrorist group formed within U.S. Army ===
In 2012 a case was brought against four U.S. Army soldiers in the state of Georgia, claiming that they formed a paramilitary group called the FEAR militia within the U.S. military with plans to overthrow the U.S. government: Pvt. Isaac Aguigui, Pfc. Michael Burnett, Sgt. Anthony Peden and Pvt. Christopher Salmon. The group purchased $87,000 worth of guns and bomb-making materials, conspired to take over Fort Stewart, bomb targets in Savannah and Washington state and assassinate the president. Burnett pleaded guilty to lesser manslaughter and gang charges in the December 2011 slayings of former soldier Michael Roark and his girlfriend Tiffany York, who were killed because they knew of the group's plans. Prosecutors sought the death penalty, but in May 2014 Peden was given a life sentence that included the possibility of parole after serving at least 30 years. Aguigui and Salmon also struck plea deals to avoid a possible death sentence and both were sentenced to life in prison without parole. Burnett agreed to testify against Peden, Aguigui, and Salmon in order to receive 8 years in prison with 40 years of court supervision.

=== Threats made by Denver area man ===
In October 2012, Mitchell Kusick was arrested by the U.S. Secret Service at his parents' suburban Denver home near Aspen after his mental health therapist told police that Kusick wanted to kill the president and had been trying to keep track of his visits to the Denver area. Assistant U.S. Attorney Richard Hosley stated that the Secret Service arrested him because "they were concerned for the community's safety". "It's clear to the court that the defendant has a severe mental illness," U.S. District Court Magistrate Judge Kristin Mix said in denying a request from Kusick's attorney to allow him to be released on bond. Kusick had been diagnosed as having bipolar disorder and Judge Mix said he posed a "risk to the community." In August 2013, Kusick pleaded guilty and was sentenced for the threats. After nine months in federal prison he was released, his release agreement including three years of supervision and comprehensive mental health treatment. He was also required to live with his parents, both of whom were psychotherapists.

== 2013 ==
=== Death ray plot ===
In June 2013, two men from upstate New York were arrested after building a "death ray" x-ray device and plotting to use it against Muslims and other perceived enemies of the US and Israel, including Obama. The men, Glenn Scott Crawford and Eric J. Feight, were arrested by the FBI after a 15-month operation involving FBI agents posing as co-conspirators. A court affidavit described the device as "a mobile, remotely operated, radiation-emitting device capable of killing human targets silently and from a distance with lethal doses of radiation."

Crawford, affiliated with the Ku Klux Klan, allegedly had contacted an Albany synagogue and a Jewish organization and asked for their assistance with technology that could be used against Israel's enemies. Crawford also plotted to kill President Obama with the device. The undercover agents rendered the weapon inoperable to eliminate potential danger to the public. Crawford and Feight were charged with "conspiracy to provide material support to terrorists". In 2015 Crawford was convicted and on December 19, 2016, he was sentenced to 30 years in federal prison. Feight pleaded guilty and was sentenced to 8 years and one month in prison.

=== Ricin plots ===
One attempt was made in April 2013 when a letter laced with ricin, a deadly poison, was sent to President Obama along with other government officials. The sender was later identified as James Everett Dutschke. In 2014 Dutschke was jailed for 25 years after pleading guilty. Another attempt was made in June 2013, when another ricin-laced letter was sent to President Obama by actress Shannon Richardson. The letter contained a threat to kill anyone attempting to take away the sender's guns or impair their "constitutional God given" right to bear arms. It was later revealed the letter's message was fake as the sender's sole intent was to incriminate her estranged husband. In November 2013, Richardson reached a plea agreement and faced up to five years' imprisonment on each of three counts. The following month she pleaded guilty. In July 2014, she was sentenced to eighteen years in prison.

== 2014 ==
=== Omar J. Gonzalez ===
The 2014 White House intrusion occurred on September 19, 2014, when Omar J. Gonzalez, an Iraq War veteran, jumped over the White House's fence and entered the building's front door before being stopped by security officers. He was then arrested and taken to George Washington University Hospital after complaining of chest pains.

Later that month, Gonzalez was indicted for entering a restricted building while armed with a knife. He was also charged with two violations of local laws: carrying a weapon outside a home or business, and ammunition possession.

== 2015 ==
=== Plot by three New York City men ===
In February 2015, three men from New York City were arrested and charged in a terrorist plot that included joining ISIL, killing President Obama, hijacking an airplane, and bombing Coney Island. One of the three men, Abdulrasul Hasanovich Juraboev, an Uzbekistan native, posted a comment on August 8, 2014, on the ISIL-related website Hilofatnews.com saying that he wanted to pledge allegiance to ISIL and become a martyr by killing the president. During an August 18 interview with law enforcement agents, Juraboev also allegedly said he would plant a bomb on Coney Island if he were so ordered by ISIL. He had bought a plane ticket to Turkey for March 29. He was arrested at his home in Brooklyn.

Another accused, Kazakh national Akhror Saidakhmetov, plotted to travel to Turkey with an informant and proposed finding an excuse to gain access to the pilot's cabin and diverting the plane to the Islamic State, so that the Islamic State would gain a plane. During a secretly recorded conversation on November 14, Saidakhmetov allegedly told Juraboev that he wanted to enlist so he could serve as an ISIL spy and when Juraboev expressed skepticism, Saidakhmetov responded that he could always open fire on American soldiers and kill as many of them as possible. On January 11, 2015, Saidakhmetov allegedly told the informant that if he could not get travel documents to go to Syria, then he would buy a gun and use it to kill police officers and FBI agents. He was arrested at John F. Kennedy International Airport while attempting to board a 12:30 a.m. flight to Ukraine en route to Turkey, where he allegedly planned to sneak across the border into Syria and join ISIL.

The third man, Arbor Habibov, an illegal immigrant from Uzbekistan, was arrested in Florida, one of several states where he ran shopping-mall kiosks that sold kitchenware and repaired cell phones.

=== Plot by a South Korean man ===
On November 11, 2016, a Korean man, surnamed Lee, was sentenced to eighteen months in prison for attempted intimidation after he posted two letters on the White House website in July 2015, in which he threatened to kill the U.S. ambassador to South Korea and rape Sasha Obama, the second daughter of President Obama. Sasha Obama was 14 years old when Lee made the rape threat. Prosecutor Chung Woo-jun (Korean: 정우준 검사) appealed and asked for a four-and-a-half year sentence, the highest sentence in court, for derogating national prestige in the U.S.–South Korea "blood alliance". In his letters, Lee threatened to assassinate United States Ambassador to South Korea Mark Lippert, who had been injured in a stabbing earlier that year.

On July 15, 2015, a member of the United States Embassy in Seoul security staff found those threat messages and first reported them to the Korean National Police Agency's foreign affairs bureau. Following the request from the U.S. Embassy, the South Korean authorities arrested Lee on July 16, 2015.

On March 12, 2020, the Supreme Court of Korea overturned the previous ruling and acquitted Lee because of insufficient evidence.

== 2016 ==
=== Joe Walsh ===
On July 7, 2016, the night of the shooting deaths of five Dallas police officers, former U.S. Congressman Joe Walsh wrote a tweet stating "This is now war. Watch out Obama. Watch out Black Lives Matter punks. Real America is coming after you". These comments were interpreted as threats towards Obama. Walsh defended the tweet stating that he wasn't calling for violence, but also stated that Twitter suspended his account following the tweet. Then Rep. Keith Ellison called for an investigation into the tweet on whether it was a threat towards Obama.

== 2017 ==
=== Syracuse "hang Obama" threats ===
In 2017, Stephen Taubert, a 59-year-old Air Force veteran and resident of Syracuse, New York, called the office of Senator Al Franken and, in a rant full of racial slurs, said he was going to "hang" former President Barack Obama. On April 29, 2019, United States District Court Judge Glenn T. Suddaby sentenced him to federal prison for 46 months for that crime and for making threats against the life of Congresswoman Maxine Waters and her staff. His sentence came six weeks after a jury found him guilty of threatening to kill a former United States president, transmitting a threat in interstate commerce and making a threat to influence, impede or retaliate against a federal official. At his sentencing, Taubert said "I'm sorry for the offensive language. That's all it was. It does get me upset when I listen to the news and they attack President Donald Trump. He's a good person and he's done a lot for this country and the veterans." After his sentencing, Grant C. Jaquith, the United States attorney for the Northern District of New York, said in a statement, "Racist threats to kill present and former public officials are not protected free speech, but serious crimes."

== 2018 ==
=== Mail bombing attempt ===
In late October 2018, officials intercepted a series of pipe bombs that had been mailed to multiple Democratic Party leaders, including Obama and Hillary Clinton, and several other high-profile individuals, such as Robert De Niro. No one was injured, and the FBI launched an investigation. A single individual, Cesar Sayoc, was subsequently charged with several felony charges related to the incident. Sayoc subsequently pled guilty to 65 felony counts related to the mailing of the 16 devices. In August 2019, Sayoc was sentenced to 20 years in prison, rather than life in prison as requested by the prosecution; the judge noted that many of the bombs were in fact hoax devices incapable of being detonated, and that Sayoc had a long history of untreated mental illness.

== 2019 ==
=== Larry Mitchell Hopkins ===
On April 20, 2019, the FBI arrested Larry Mitchell Hopkins. According to the FBI, Hopkins stated that he and his militia band, the United Constitutional Patriots, were training to assassinate Obama. On January 2, 2020, Hopkins pleaded guilty to a federal charge of being a felon in possession of a firearm. On April 15, 2020, he was sentenced to 21 months in prison.

== 2023 ==
=== Arrest of Taylor Taranto ===
On June 29, 2023, 37-year-old Taylor Taranto, who participated in the January 6 Capitol attack, was arrested near the home of Obama in Washington, D.C., with weapons and explosive-making materials. Prosecutors said that prior to his arrest Taranto had posted a message on Telegram reading, "We got these losers surrounded! See you in hell, Podesta's and Obama's", after viewing a Truth Social post by then-former President Donald Trump containing Obama's home address. Taranto was also accused of making threats against Jamie Raskin, Kevin McCarthy and John Podesta. Taranto was convicted of illegal possession of firearms and making threats and sentenced to time served, having already spent 22 months in pretrial detention.

== See also ==
- Threatening the president of the United States
- 11B-X-1371, a viral video falsely believed to contain a death threat against Obama
- Security incidents involving George W. Bush
- Security incidents involving Donald Trump
- Security incidents involving Mahathir Mohamad
