= List of United States vice presidential assassination attempts and plots =

Assassination attempts and plots on the vice president of the United States have occurred as early as the 19th century. While not as common as assassination attempts on presidents of the United States, they have emerged in the 20th and 21st centuries amid increasing political polarization and advancements in federal investigative capabilities.

Protection of the vice president was historically limited until the late 20th century. Following several attacks and heightened concerns over presidential succession, the role of the United States Secret Service in safeguarding vice presidents expanded significantly. Modern vice presidents receive continuous protective detail while in office, and many former vice presidents continue to receive protection under federal law.

== List of attacks, assassination attempts, and plots ==
=== Andrew Johnson ===
- April 1865: In 1864, Confederate sympathizer John Wilkes Booth formulated a plan to kidnap President Abraham Lincoln in exchange for the release of Confederate prisoners. After attending an April 11, 1865 speech in which Lincoln promoted voting rights for African Americans, Booth decided to assassinate the president instead. Learning that the president would be attending Ford's Theatre, Booth planned with co-conspirators to assassinate Lincoln at the theater. The conspiracy also included assassinating Vice President Andrew Johnson in Kirkwood House, where Johnson lived while Vice President, and Secretary of State William H. Seward at Seward's house. Beyond Lincoln's assassination on April 14, 1865, the plot failed: Seward was only wounded, and Johnson's would-be attacker did not follow through. After being on the run for 12 days, Booth was tracked down and was shot and mortally wounded by Union cavalryman Boston Corbett. Eight other conspirators were later convicted for their roles in the conspiracy; four were hanged and four received life sentences.

=== Charles W. Fairbanks ===
- June 1905: Charles W. Fairbanks travelled to Flint, Michigan to lay the cornerstone of a new federal building, and to then deliver a speech to over 2,000 attendees. Roughly 20 minutes into the speech, 32-year-old anarchist James McConnell forced his way through the crowd holding a revolver concealed in his hip pocket. Four nearby detectives noticed this and choked McConnell until he was subdued. Fairbanks then continued his speech without interruption. Fairbanks had become an outspoken advocate for banning anarchists from entering the country following the assassination of William McKinley, which motivated McConnell to assassinate him. As federal laws protecting vice presidents had not yet been enacted, he was only charged with disorderly conduct.

=== Thomas R. Marshall ===
- July 2, 1915: Harvard University professor Eric Muenter, who opposed American support of the Allied war effort, broke into the U.S. Senate and, finding the door to the Senate chamber locked, laid dynamite outside the reception room, which happened to be next to Thomas R. Marshall's office door. Although the bomb was set with a timer, it exploded prematurely just before midnight, while no one was in the office. Muenter was later arrested, where he confessed to attempting to assassinate Marshall.

=== Hubert Humphrey ===
- April 9, 1965: Hubert Humphrey delivered a speech at Louisiana State University, however it was heavily monitored after an undercover state policeman informed the Federal Bureau of Investigation (FBI) that members of the Ku Klux Klan (KKK) planned to assassinate Humphrey during his speech because of his support for civil rights and integration. One alleged gunman reportedly reached for a concealed pistol before being subdued by agents, and another suspect had a firearm in his car. None of them were charged due to lack of evidence.
- February 1966: Peter Kocan, a 19-year-old man who would later attempt to assassinate Arthur Calwell, planned to assassinate Humphrey during his trip to Australia in 1966. He later abandoned the plan because security was too tight.
- October 1967: Humphrey attended the inauguration of South Vietnamese President Nguyễn Văn Thiệu in Saigon. While Humphrey’s motorcade was waiting near the presidential palace, a Secret Service agent reportedly felt the vehicles had remained stationary too long and ordered the limousine moved. Roughly a minute later, mortar rounds struck vehicles near where Humphrey's car had been positioned. One driver was killed. Secret Service personnel later believed Humphrey himself had likely been the intended target and that the attack was carried out by Viet Cong forces.

=== George H. W. Bush ===
- September 27, 1988: During George H. W. Bush's 1988 presidential campaign, 21-year-old David A. Russell of Owensboro, Kentucky, attended a nearby campaign rally armed with a .45 caliber pistol. As Bush shook hands with supporters, Russell took photographs of him roughly 50 yards away. Two days later, he wrote a letter to the White House, demanding that Bush drop out of the race, and attached a photo he had taken at the rally. He threatened to assassinate Bush if he refused. The letter was traced back to Russell, and he was arrested and charged. In 1989, he was convicted and sentenced to 22 months in prison, three years of probation, and to pay a $5,000 fine.

=== Dick Cheney ===
- February 27, 2007: A suicide bomber associated with the Taliban attacked the outer gate of the Bagram Airfield in Afghanistan during Dick Cheney's visit, killing 23 people and injuring at least 20 others. Cheney himself was roughly one mile away from the site of the explosion and was not injured.

=== JD Vance ===
- June 11, 2025: 67-year-old James Donald Vance Jr. of Grand Rapids, Michigan was arrested for threatening to kill JD Vance, along with President Donald Trump, businessman Elon Musk, and activist Donald Trump Jr. through the social media platform Bluesky. In one post, he claimed he did not care whether he was shot by the Secret Service or spend the rest of his life in prison for doing so. Four months later on November 17, he was convicted and sentenced to two years in prison.
- April 25, 2026: 31-year-old Cole Tomas Allen, an academic tutor and video game developer from Torrance, California, allegedly ran past the security checkpoint at the Washington Hilton Hotel during the annual White House Correspondents' Dinner, and fired one shot hitting a Secret Service agent who was wearing a bulletproof vest in the process. He tripped and fell to the ground before he could reach the ballroom, where he was immediately subdued, arrested, and taken into custody. Trump and those in the banquet hall were all immediately evacuated. Authorities later announced that Trump and other administration officials were targeted, based on Allen's alleged manifesto. He was charged with attempting to assassinate Trump, however more charges are yet to come regarding other officials.
- May 4, 2026: 45-year-old Michael Marx was confronted by Secret Service agents while he was carrying a gun near Independence Ave and 15St SW, near the Washington Monument after Vance's motorcade passed through the area. Marx and a bystander were shot after the former allegedly opened fire. He was transported to a local hospital before being taken into custody.
