= Zainon Ismail C.N. Afghani =

Cikgu Non @ C.N. Afghani Zainon Ismail

Cikgu Zainon Ismail is a Malaysian writer and public speaker. He fought with the Afghan mujahideen, during the Soviet–Afghan War.

== Early life and career ==
Zainon Ismail or fondly known as Cikgu Non was a primary school teacher in Kedah, Malaysia. He served as a teacher in the late 70's and joined politics soon after. He was then involved in many Islamic movements and groups prior to his Jihad service in the Afghanistan wars.

== Aftermath of the Memali incident ==
The Memali Incident, which resulted in casualties among police officers and PAS members, drew significant public attention. After returning to Malaysia, Zainon assisted the widows of PAS members affected by the incident. Zainon expressed concern for the well-being of the widows and children affected by the incident, which he claimed was not adequately addressed by PAS leadership. He alleged that other PAS leaders collected donations under the Memali fund but did not distribute them to the intended beneficiaries. According to Zainon, the distribution of funds lacked transparency and accountability. The widows and children of those who died in the incident did not get even a cent of the said fund. Even Abdul Hadi Awang, the man who started the Memali incident with his Amanat Hadi or Dictum of Hadi Awang was indifferent to the struggle of the widows and orphans of the Memali casualties that he proudly claim as martyrs.

=== The rise of C.N. Afghani ===
Zainon stated that he was motivated by concern for the welfare of those who were affected by the incident. he took care of all the orphans by providing money for education, food and shelter. He married one of the widows and run a grocery business. Proceeds of the business is given evenly to all of the widows and orphans. He asked the PAS central committee to give some of the proceeds of the Memali funds to those who are entitled to it. However, his application was denied as most of the money has been spent on political agenda of the party. Zainon Ismail rose up and demanded that PAS was responsible for the Memali incident and should take responsibility. According to Zainon, PAS leadership dismissed his concerns and distanced themselves from him. Saddened by the act of his comrades, Zainon Ismail wrote a book about the struggles of the widows and orphans of the Memali Incident. Using the name C.N. Afghani as a pen name, in his book Airmata Di Bumi Memali or The Tears of Memali Zainon criticized PAS's handling of the donation funds and alleged mismanagement.

=== Reception of the release ===
Haji Abdul Hadi Awang stated that the Tears of Memali book should not be read as it is haram. He went further by saying that those who sell, buy, and read the book should be beaten up. In his book C.N. Afghani stated that many of the widows and orphans came up to the point of starving to death, even though millions of ringgit were collected by the PAS central committee using the name and status of the Memali incident victims. The collected money were used to finance the political movement or given to individuals. The open revelation of the book was highly anticipated by both UMNO and PAS members alike. However, PAS leaders were afraid that with the release of the book, it may brought them down to their knees.

== Kafirkah Aku? (Am I an Infidel?) ==
Recently, C.N. Afghani came up with a new book entitled Kafirkah Aku? or Am I an Infidel? which contains criticism directed at Abdul Hadi Awang. Abdul Hadi once stated in his ceramah and dictum that those who supports and joins UMNO are considered as an infidel. He also said that making political arrangements with non-muslims is prohibited and those who befriended a non-muslim (hitting out at the Barisan Nasional) coalition will be considered as an infidel too.

== See also ==
- Security incidents involving Mahathir Mohamad
