= Vladimir Arutyunian =

Georgian attempted assassin and murderer (born 1978)

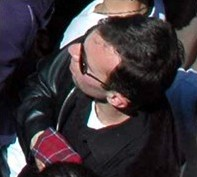
- Arutyunian waiting with a hand grenade in a handkerchief
- Born: 12 March 1978 (age 48); Tbilisi, Georgian SSR, Soviet Union
- Known for: Attempted assassination of George W. Bush and Mikheil Saakashvili
- Penalty: Life imprisonment

Details
- Date: 10 May 2005 (attempt); 20 July 2005 (shootout)
- Killed: 1 (Zurab Kvlividze)

Vladimir Arutyunian (Georgian: ვლადიმერ არუთინიანი; Armenian: Վլադիմիր Հարությունյան, romanized: Vladimir Harut’yunyan; born 12 March 1978) is a Georgian national who, on 10 May 2005, attempted to assassinate United States President George W. Bush and Georgian President Mikheil Saakashvili by throwing a hand grenade at both of them. The attempt failed when the grenade did not detonate. He was later arrested following a shootout in which he killed Zurab Kvlividze, an intelligence agent, and was sentenced to life in prison.

== Background ==
Vladimir Arutyunian, a Georgian citizen and ethnic Armenian, was born on 12 March 1978 in Tbilisi, Soviet Georgia. Arutyunian lost his father at an early age and lived with his mother, who was a stall-holder at the local street market. After the collapse of the Soviet Union, they lived in one of the poorest suburbs of Tbilisi. After completing his secondary education, he had no fixed occupation.

Arutyunian joined the Democratic Union for Revival party led by Aslan Abashidze in January 2004, in the same month that Mikheil Saakashvili became president of Georgia and led the country through the 2004 Adjara crisis, in which Abashidze refused to obey the central government authorities. Saakashvili and his party were considered to be pro-United States, while Abashidze and his party were considered to be pro-Russia. The crisis ended in 2004 without bloodshed, and Arutyunian soon left the Revival party.

== Assassination attempt ==
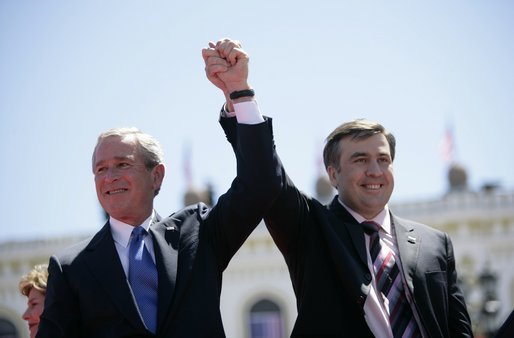
Presidents George W. Bush (left) of the U.S. and Mikheil Saakashvili of Georgia (right) in Tbilisi on 10 May 2005

On 10 May 2005, Arutyunian waited for the United States President George W. Bush and Georgian President Mikheil Saakashvili to speak in Tbilisi's central Liberty Square. When Bush began speaking, Arutyunian pulled the pin on a Soviet-made RGD-5 hand grenade, wrapped in a red tartan handkerchief, and threw it toward the podium where Bush stood speaking.

The grenade hit a girl, landing 18.6 metres (61 ft) from the podium, near where Saakashvili, his wife Sandra Roelofs, Laura Bush, and other officials were seated. The red handkerchief remained wrapped around the grenade, preventing the striker lever from releasing, so the grenade failed to detonate. A Georgian security officer quickly removed the grenade, and Arutyunian disappeared. Although original reports indicated that the grenade was not live, it was later revealed that it was.

Arutyunian later said that he threw the grenade "towards the heads" so that "the shrapnel would fly behind the bulletproof glass". Bush and Saakashvili did not learn of the incident until after the rally.

== Aftermath ==
On 18 July 2005, Georgia's Interior Minister Vano Merabishvili issued photos of an unidentified suspect and announced a reward of 150,000 lari (US$80,000) for information leading to the suspect's identification.

At the request of the Georgian government, the US Federal Bureau of Investigation began an investigation into the incident. Extra manpower was brought in from the surrounding region to help with the investigation. In one picture of the crowd, the FBI noted a man in the bleachers with a large camera. He was a visiting professor from Boise, Idaho, US. FBI agents contacted him and, with his photographs, were able to identify a suspect.

=== Arrest ===
On 20 July 2005, acting on a tip from a hotline, police raided Arutyunian's home where he lived with his mother. During an ensuing gunfight, Arutyunian killed the head of the Interior Ministry's counterintelligence department, Zurab Kvlividze. He then fled into the woods in the village of Vashlijvari on the outskirts of Tbilisi. After being wounded in the leg, he was captured by Georgia's anti-terror unit.

DNA samples from Arutyunian matched the DNA samples from the handkerchief. Georgian police later found a chemical lab and a stockpile of explosives, chemicals and other material Arutyunian had built up in his apartment. Twenty litres (5.3 U.S. gallons) of sulfuric acid, several drawers full of mercury thermometers, a microscope, and "enough dangerous substances to carry out several terrorist acts" were found.

=== Trial and conviction ===
"I don't consider myself a terrorist, I'm just a human being."

— Arutyunian

After his arrest, Arutyunian was shown on television admitting from his hospital bed that he had thrown the grenade. He said that he had attempted to assassinate both presidents because he hated Georgia's new government for being a "puppet" of the United States. He further stated that he did not regret what he did and would do it again if he had the chance.

Arutyunian initially admitted his guilt when arrested but refused to cooperate during the trial. He pleaded not guilty, then refused to answer questions in court. His lawyer Elisabed Japaridze said after the conviction and sentencing that she would appeal. "I consider that everything was far from proved." She cited the fact that Arutyunian's fingerprints were not found on the grenade. However, prosecutor Anzor Khvadagiani said that the grenade being wrapped in cloth explained the lack of distinguishable fingerprints and also that DNA tests of material found on the cloth matched Arutyunian's.

On 11 January 2006, a Georgian court sentenced Arutyunian to life imprisonment for the attempted assassination of Bush and Saakashvili, and the killing of Kvlividze. In September 2005, a United States federal grand jury also indicted Arutyunian, and could ask to extradite him if he is ever released. He is not eligible for parole, and could only be released under a presidential pardon.

== See also ==
- List of United States presidential assassination attempts and plots
- John Schrank (attempted Theodore Roosevelt 1912)
- Samuel Byck (attempted Nixon 1974)
- Lynette Fromme (attempted Ford 1975)
- Sara Jane Moore (attempted Ford 1975)
- John Hinckley Jr. (attempted Reagan 1981)
- Thomas Matthew Crooks (attempted Trump 2024)
