= Security incidents involving Mahathir Mohamad =

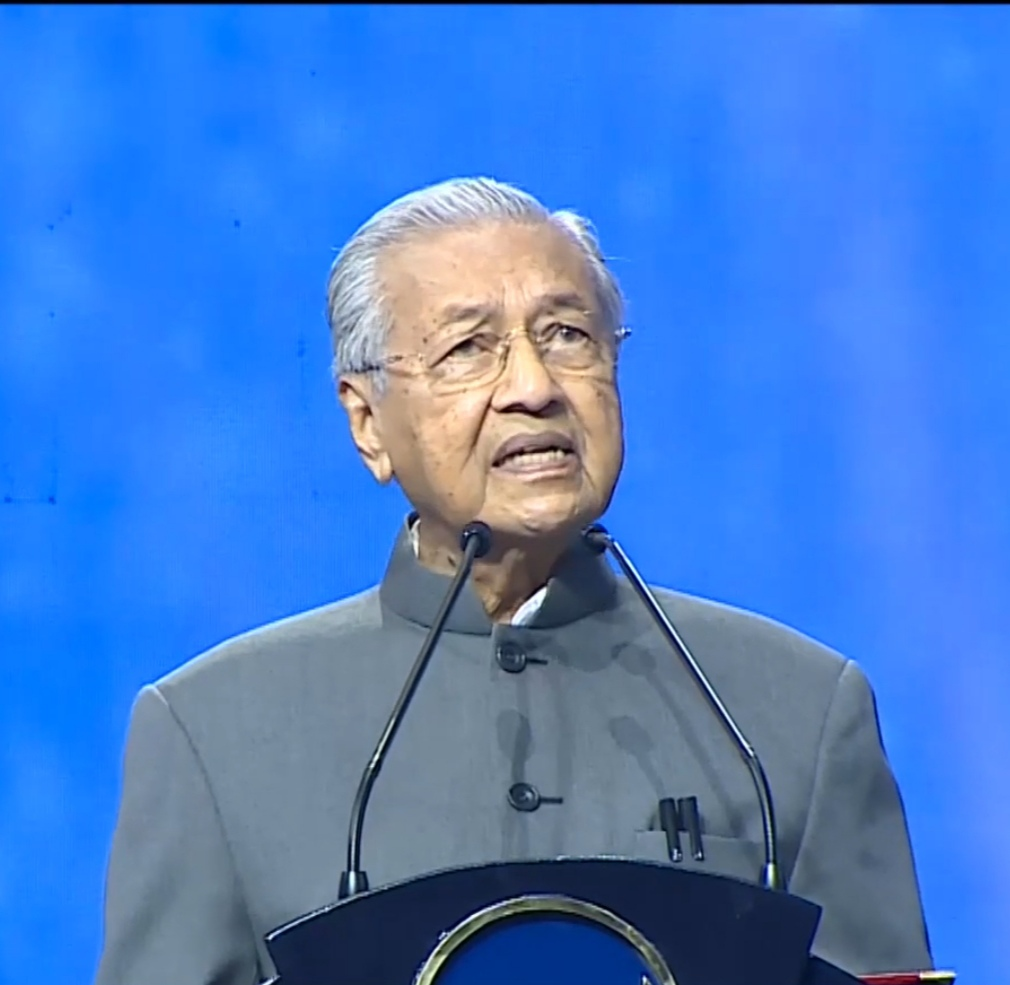
Mahathir Mohamad in 2022

Mahathir Mohamad, the longest-serving Prime Minister of Malaysia, has faced multiple security threats throughout his political career. These incidents include bomb hoaxes, death threats, assassination plots, and physical attacks. While some were mere hoaxes, others involved serious attempts on his life by political extremists and terrorist groups. This article documents notable security incidents involving Mahathir throughout his time in politics.

== 1970s ==
In November 1979, Mahathir remained calm during a bomb hoax at the Ministry of Trade and Industry building in Jalan Duta, Kuala Lumpur. While many workers evacuated the 15-storey building, Mahathir and his staff stayed put. This incident marked the second time he had experienced such a threat, with a similar hoax occurring two years earlier at the Federal House in Jalan Kinabalu. On both occasions, the police were alerted, and bomb disposal units conducted thorough searches of the premises, but no explosives were found, and the situations were resolved without incident.

== 1984 ==
On 11 September 1984, Bernama reported that PAS extremists had formed a group to assassinate Mahathir. The report, based on intelligence sources, claimed a Kedah PAS leader provided a list of five UMNO figures to be killed in the name of implementing Islamic law. Mahathir later stating that he was aware of rumors about PAS forming a group to kill UMNO leaders but had no concrete evidence.

== 1988 ==
In 1988, Zainon Ismail, better known by his pen name CN Afghani, devised a plan to assassinate Mahathir. At the time, Zainon was the Padang Terap PAS Youth chief and was influenced by Amanat Hadi, a controversial speech delivered by PAS president Abdul Hadi Awang in 1981, which labeled Umno members as infidels. The plan aimed to expedite the establishment of an Islamic state, as the electoral process was deemed too slow. It included a list of cabinet ministers to be killed and a shadow cabinet ready to replace the Barisan Nasional government, with Hadi envisioned as prime minister. However, the plan was uncovered by authorities, leading to the arrest of 30 individuals involved.

On 3 April 2013, Zainon Ismail met Mahathir to apologize for his 1988 assassination plan. Mahathir stated that he accepted the apology with an open heart and appreciated their acknowledgment of past mistakes.

== 1999 ==
On 19 March 1999, Deputy Minister in the Prime Minister's Department, Ibrahim Ali, lodged a police report regarding a tape that allegedly incited people to assassinate Mahathir and other Umno leaders. Mahathir's representative, Osman Aroff, also received the death threat call. After Ibrahim Ali's report, police questioned six individuals to assist in investigating the tape. The investigation focused on identifying the source, the speaker, and those responsible for producing and distributing the tape, while efforts were made to prevent its circulation to safeguard national security.

== 2006 ==
On 28 July 2006, Mahathir was attacked with pepper spray at Kota Bharu airport in Kelantan while arriving for a public meeting. Surrounded by about 1,000 cheering supporters upon his arrival at the airport, an unidentified assailant fired pepper spray from a can at him, causing temporary breathing difficulties. Mahathir recovered quickly and did not require hospital treatment. The incident caused chaos at the scene.

Following the attack, Abdullah Ahmad Badawi, the then Prime Minister, expressed his regret and anger, emphasizing that those responsible should be severely punished. He also directed the police to take swift action to resolve the matter and prevent any negative implications or rumors, particularly through the Internet. Abdullah also said any Umno member involved in the pepper spray incident faced expulsion from Umno and may be stripped of party posts. Deputy Police Chief Musa Hassan stated that the attack was triggered by a dispute between two groups of Mahathir's supporters over which vehicles should be used to transport him.

On 9 August, businessman Nik Sapeia Nik Yusof was charged in connection with the incident in which Mahathir was attacked with pepper spray. On 14 January 2010, the Kota Bharu Magistrate's Court found Nik Sapeia guilty and sentenced him to six months in jail. However, in 2012, the High Court reversed the decision and acquitted him.

On 18 March 2015, The Court of Appeal upheld the acquittal of Nik Sapeia who was accused of pepper-spraying Mahathir in 2006.

== 2020 ==
In January 2020, Malaysian police foiled a plot by an Islamic State sympathizer to assassinate Mahathir. The suspect, Wan Amirul Azlan bin Jalaluddin, confessed after his arrest that he planned to attack Mahathir and other officials with knives or sharp objects to show support for ISIS.
