= Attempted assassination of Donald Trump in Florida =

Foiled assassination plot in Florida, U.S.

- Part of security incidents involving Donald Trump
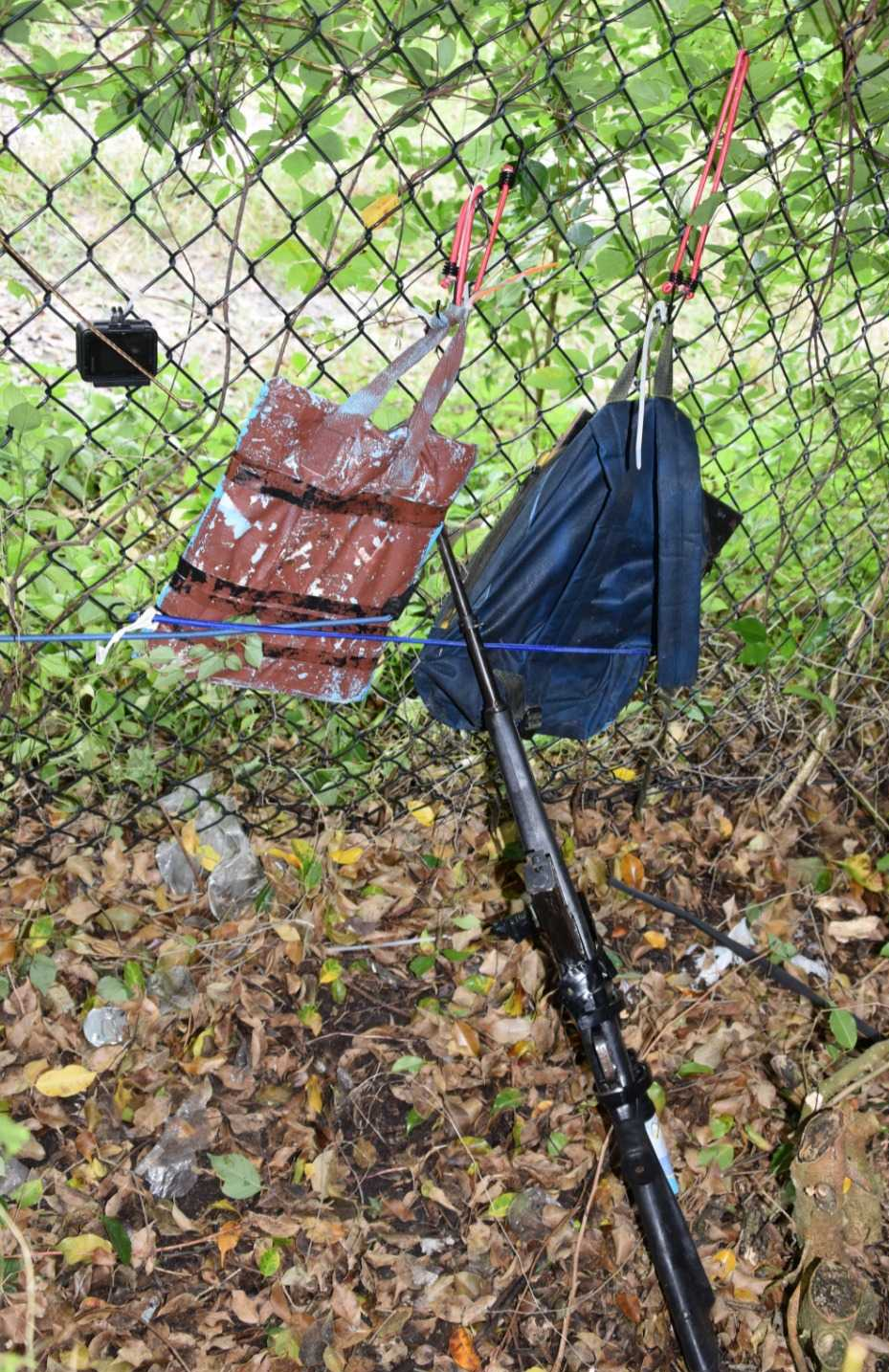
- Backpack, GoPro, and SKS-pattern rifle in a concealed location
- Location: 26°40′00″N 80°5′21″W; Trump International Golf Club in West Palm Beach, Florida, U.S.
- Date: September 15, 2024; 2 years ago 1:31 p.m. (UTC−04:00)
- Target: Donald Trump
- Attack type: Assassination attempt
- Weapon: SKS semi-automatic 7.62x39 caliber rifle
- Deaths: 0
- Injuries: 1 (indirectly)
- Perpetrator: Ryan Routh
- Motive: Prevent Trump from winning the 2024 presidential election
- Charges: 3 counts: State: Attempted felony murder; Attempted first-degree murder; Terrorism
- Verdict: Guilty on all federal counts
- Convictions: 5 counts: Federal: Attempted assassination of a major presidential candidate; Possessing a firearm in furtherance of a crime of violence; Assaulting a federal officer; Possession of a firearm by a convicted felon; Possession of a firearm with the serial number removed
- Sentence: Federal: Life imprisonment without the possibility of parole plus 7 years to run consecutively

On September 15, 2024, Donald Trump, then a former president of the United States and nominee of the Republican Party in the 2024 presidential election, survived an assassination attempt by 58-year-old Ryan Wesley Routh, a roofer and Russo-Ukrainian war activist, while golfing at Trump International Golf Club in West Palm Beach, Florida. Routh was motivated to assassinate Trump to prevent him from being elected. The incident occurred two months after Trump survived a previous assassination attempt while speaking at a campaign rally near Butler, Pennsylvania.

That day, Routh, who had been planning the attack for months, was spotted hiding in shrubbery holding an SKS rifle just outside the fence of the golf course. After hiding there for nearly 12 hours, Routh pointed his weapon through the fence line, approximately 400 yards (370 m) away from Trump. A Secret Service agent noticed this and fired four rounds towards Routh, who then fled the scene and was later captured in Martin County via a traffic stop. Two conspirators who helped Routh obtain the rifle were also later arrested and charged.

Routh was indicted on a total of five federal charges and three state charges, all of which Routh pleaded not guilty to. In July 2025, Routh chose to fire his public defenders and represent himself. His trial began on September 8, 2025. Two weeks later on September 23, he was found guilty on all five federal counts. While the verdict was being read in the courtroom, Routh grabbed a pen and repeatedly attempted to stab himself in the neck, before being tackled by U.S. marshals. On February 4, 2026, he was sentenced to life in prison without the possibility of parole plus 7 years.

== Background ==
Trump International Golf Club had been noted as a potential target for attempts on Trump's life. Officials told Trump that if photographers could get a clear view of him, potential gunmen could do the same. The incident occurred 64 days after a previous assassination attempt on Trump at a campaign rally near Butler, Pennsylvania, in which he was shot and wounded in his upper right ear by a 20-year-old sniper, Thomas Crooks. Law enforcement officials said that the golf course's perimeter was not fully secured as Trump was not an incumbent president. The Secret Service did not search the perimeter of the golf course, as Trump's visit there was not a scheduled event.

On September 12, Trump posted on X (formerly Twitter) about a planned event at his golf club on September 16 to introduce the crypto platform World Liberty Financial.

== Incident ==
On September 15, 2024, Trump was golfing at Trump International Golf Club in West Palm Beach with his friend and donor Steve Witkoff. Trump was walking along the fifth hole when Robert Fercano, a Secret Service agent, conducted a sweep of the sixth hole ahead of him for any threats. During the sweep, Routh was seen aiming a rifle at Fercano while hiding in shrubs approximately 400 yards (370 m) away. The position in which Routh had been is well-known as a spot frequently used by paparazzi to photograph Trump at his golf course. At 1:31 p.m. EDT (approximately 12 hours after Routh's 1:59 a.m. arrival), Fercano, having seen the rifle barrel move, fired four rounds towards Routh, who then dropped his weapon and fled in a vehicle. After the shot was fired, Trump was escorted off the course by his Secret Service protective detail. Routh did not have a clear line of sight on Trump and did not fire his gun. Tommy Craig McGee, a witness who was driving to a nearby furniture store at the time of the incident, saw him running out of the woods and into a black car. He quickly took three photos and a video of Routh's vehicle, assisting authorities in tracking it down. The golf course was locked down shortly after the incident, and no injuries were reported.

After Routh fled the scene, a "be on the lookout" was issued to law enforcement with details about the suspect's car, a black Nissan Xterra SUV. At 2:22 p.m, after pulling over the vehicle on Interstate 95 in Martin County, Martin County Sheriff's Office deputies Nicholas Shaw and Gedeon Brenovil forced Routh out of the car and arrested him at gunpoint. According to the Palm Beach County Sheriff's Office, Routh was detained as a person of interest while he was driving northbound on Interstate 95 from Palm Beach County. The sheriff's units "waited [for] a while" to stop the vehicle to avoid engaging in a high-speed chase. Seventeen burner cell-phones were found inside Routh's vehicle. An SKS-style rifle with a removed serial number, a scope, two backpacks containing ceramic tiles that could deflect a bullet, a plastic bag containing food, and a GoPro camera, were recovered at the scene. Routh was unarmed at the time of his arrest.

After Routh's arrest, Trump contacted the Martin County Sheriff's Office and requested that those involved in Routh's apprehension join him at Mar-a-Lago so he could personally thank them for their work. Each deputy signed a pair of black handcuffs and gave them to Trump. Lieutenant Travis Dykes stated that there could have been a "potential disaster" if the police department didn't work together as a group. Martin County Sheriff William Snyder told WPTV that he "could not be more proud of his crew."

== Perpetrator ==
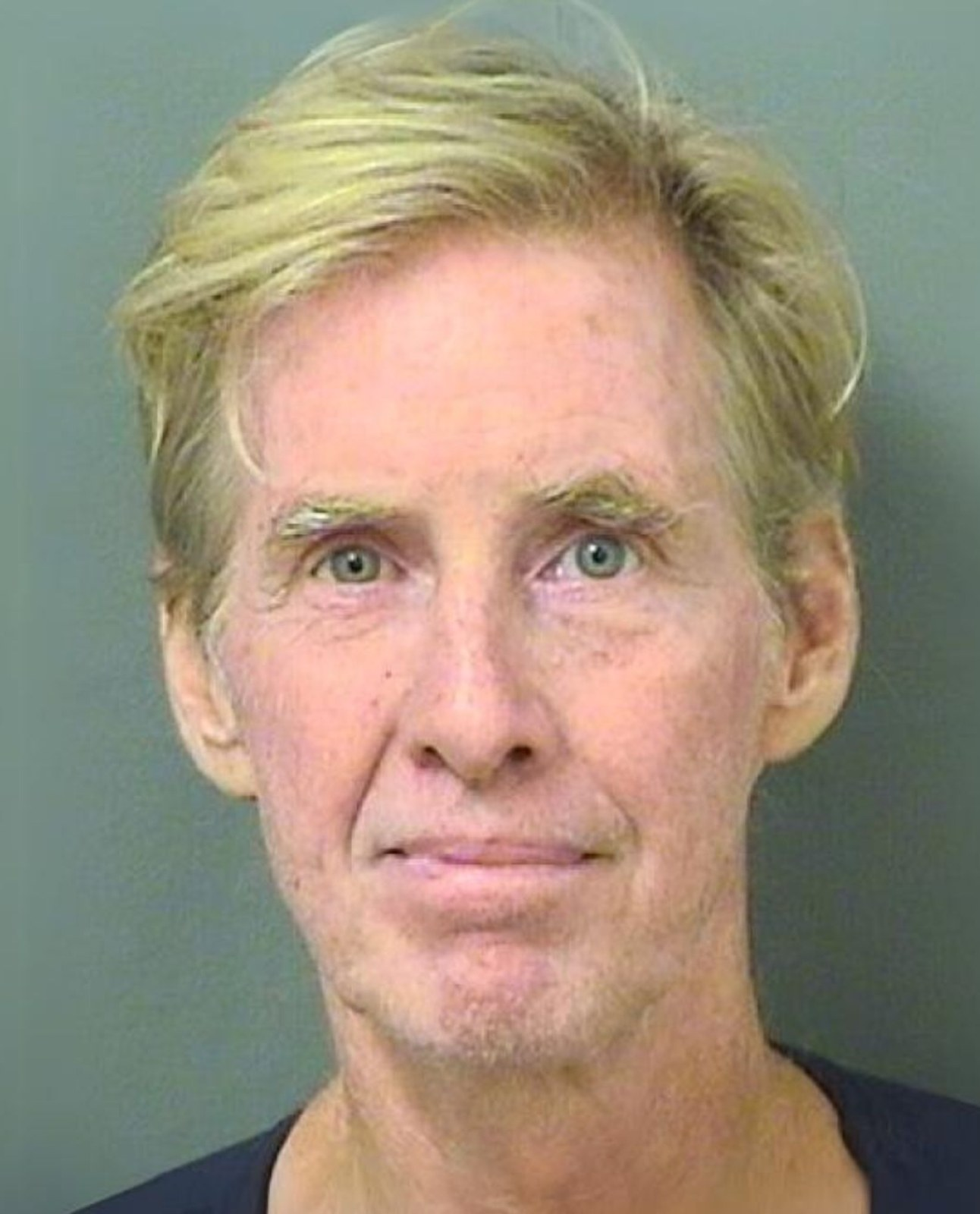
Routh's mug shot after his initial arrest.

Ryan Wesley Routh was born on February 18, 1966, in Guilford County, North Carolina, to Daniel Wesley Routh (June 30, 1938 - December 11, 2021) and Marjorie Patton Fearing (born 1938). He had graduated from Northwest Guilford High School in 1984. He began attending the University of North Carolina at Greensboro in 1988, however he dropped out in 1990. In 1995, Routh attended North Carolina A&T State University for two semesters, however he dropped out later that year before finishing any degree program. In the early 1990's, Routh opened a roofing company in Greensboro, North Carolina called United Roofing. He abandoned the business in the early 2000s.

In January 1989, Routh married Lora Frances Wilson, and had two sons and a daughter. They divorced in 2003. Routh's daughter and youngest son, Sara Ellen Routh and Adam A. Routh, lived with him full time after the divorce, while his eldest son, Oran Alexander Routh, lived with Lora full time. In 2018, he moved to Kaʻaʻawa, Hawaii with his fiancé and his daughter and youngest son, and they started a shed-building business together called Camp Box Honolulu. Routh and his eldest son, Oran, had had a falling out and had not talked prior to the assassination attempt, although following the attempt Oran said that his father was "a loving and caring father, and honest, hardworking man" and that "it doesn't sound like the man I know to do anything crazy, much less violent".

Routh had a history of political activity online and offline, with his political engagement dating back to at least 1989, where he registered as a Democrat. He registered as an independent in 2012. Voting records showed that he did not vote in the 2016 elections, but in a 2020 Twitter post, he claimed to have voted for Trump in 2016 and later regretted it. In a self-published ebook in 2023, he wrote about his supposed previous support for Trump, saying, "I am man enough to say that I misjudged and made a terrible mistake." He reached out to Iran in his book, saying they should feel free to assassinate Trump for the United States withdrawal from the Joint Comprehensive Plan of Action, as well as Routh himself for supporting Trump in the past. Routh condemned the January 6 Capitol attack as being "perpetrated by Donald Trump and his undemocratic posse". After his disillusionment with Trump, Routh announced his support for various presidential opponents of Trump, including both Democratic and Republican presidential candidates. Additionally, Routh donated $140 to Democratic causes since 2019. He voted in North Carolina's Democratic primary elections in 2024.

Routh had a lengthy criminal record prior to the assassination attempt, ranging from 1984 to 2016. During that timeframe, Routh had been convicted of over a hundred criminal counts of various crimes, and had been arrested at least eight times. Routh typically received parole or probation for all these offenses, with no record of time that he was in prison. He roughly had one hundred encounters with local law enforcement, according to a retired Greensboro police officer who Routh knew by name. Throughout his career, Routh had been ordered to pay tens of thousands of dollars to plaintiffs related to more than 200 civil lawsuits.

=== Claimed activities related to the Russo-Ukrainian War ===
Routh claimed on his social media accounts, as well as in 2022 interviews with The New York Times, Newsweek Romania, and Der Tagesspiegel to have made efforts to recruit foreign soldiers for Ukraine in its war against Russia. Newsweek reported Routh had claimed to have fought in Ukraine, while he told The New York Times he did not fight in Ukraine. Routh said in a 2022 interview with a Romanian reporter in Kyiv that he flew to Ukraine to join the army in the months after Russia's full-scale invasion, but learned that he was "not an ideal candidate" for the battlefield because he was in his mid-50s with no military experience. Later in 2022, Routh said in an interview that after he was rejected for military service, he began recruiting volunteer soldiers for the Ukrainian military. Routh complained of roadblocks to Ukraine admitting foreign fighters, telling the publication Semafor that "Ukraine is very often hard to work with, they're afraid that anybody and everybody is a Russian spy". Routh was filmed at an April 2022 protest in Independence Square in Kyiv.

A former volunteer for Ukraine's International Legion, Evelyn Aschenbrenner, branded Routh as "delusional" and a "liar" over his claims that he recruited for the Ukrainian organization, saying Routh was "not, and never has been, associated with the International Legion or the Ukrainian Armed Forces at all". Aschenbrenner said of Routh "He was combative. He was argumentative. He refused repeatedly to understand basic army policy", further adding "There was delusions of grandeur and [he was] very disconnected from reality". The International Legion for the Defense of Ukraine said in a statement that Routh had "never been part of, associated with, or linked" to it "in any capacity."

Chelsea Walsh, a travel nurse who had met Routh in Ukraine, viewed Routh as "a threat to others" and a "ticking time bomb", and warned a Homeland Security agent upon her return from Ukraine. She claimed that Routh decided to dedicate his life to protecting Ukraine upon first hearing about the war in 2022, and that he would become "vengeful" and "angry" if he did not get his way. Sometime in 2023, Walsh ultimately reported Routh to the FBI for his behavior. Routh had also claimed to her to have organized a protest outside President Volodymyr Zelenskyy's home and was jailed for it, although this was not confirmed. Walsh repeated her concerns to both the FBI and Interpol.

In November 2023, Routh arrived back in Hawaii.

== Investigation ==
Police body-cam footage of Routh's apprehension, roughly 50 minutes after the assassination attempt

After being arrested as the potential suspect, Routh was charged with two offenses: possession of a firearm by a convicted felon and possession of a firearm with the serial number removed. Less than a day after the arrest, he was seen smiling and laughing with his lawyer. Footage of his arrest was released to the public. Routh was charged on September 24 with attempting to assassinate a presidential candidate, as well as assaulting a federal officer and possessing a firearm in furtherance of a crime of violence.

Lazaro and Samuel Plata, two brothers who were former employees of Routh, contacted law enforcement on September 18, stating that Routh had dropped off a box containing a 12-page letter at their house in April 2024, several months before the incident. The two opened the box after the incident. Improvised destructive device components, burner cellphones, and .50 caliber ammunition was recovered from the box. Earlier that same day, on September 18, Routh was transferred to Miami's Federal Detention Center. On September 23, 2024, the Department of Justice publicized the first page of the letter; it stated:

Dear World, this was an assassination attempt on Donald Trump but I am so sorry I failed you. I tried my best and gave it all the gumption I could muster. It is up to you now to finish the job; and I will offer $150,000 to whomever can complete the job. Everyone across the globe from the youngest to the oldest know that Trump is unfit to be anything, much less a U.S president. U.S presidents must at bare minimum embody the moral fabric that is America and be kind, caring and selfless and always stand for humanity. Trump fails to understand any of-

According to authorities, the letter indicated that Routh may have planned the assassination attempt as early as February 2024, and simultaneously acknowledged months in advance that he might fail.

The Federal Bureau of Investigation led the investigation of the incident, along with the United States Secret Service and the Palm Beach County Sheriff's Office. The FBI treated the incident as an attempted assassination. Florida Governor Ron DeSantis pledged to open a state-level investigation into the incident.

On the day of the incident, Routh's motive was described as unknown. Shortly after the incident, law enforcement linked the license plates for the Nissan Xterra used by Routh to a 2012 Ford truck that was reported as stolen. McGee identified Routh after he was taken into custody. Data from his cell phone showed that he had arrived at the golf course at 1:59 a.m., where he had waited for roughly 12 hours.

Further investigation revealed that the seventeen burner cellphones found in Routh's vehicle were bought by him under the alias "John White". Several licenses plates were discovered in the vehicle as well, one owned by his daughter, Sara. It was later discovered that Routh had stolen these license plates to evade detection and capture while fleeing the scene of the assassination attempt, and that he used one of them during an earlier reconnaissance. More items found inside Routh's vehicle included cartridge casings, several empty SunnyD bottles and Vienna sausage cans, orange earplugs, and notes about flights to Mexico and Colombia. A notebook belonging to Routh was also found, which included several pages of names and numbers pertaining to overseas locations. Authorities described the vehicle as "unorganized," and that they believed Routh may have lived in it for a while.

In November 2024, all of the chat logs on Routh's WhatsApp account were investigated by The Independent and investigative newsroom Lighthouse Reports after it was discovered that on September 12, three days before the incident, Routh exchanged messages through this app with British-trained commandos from Afghanistan about recruitment to the Russo-Ukrainian War. Routh's account on the app consisted of several discussions with special forces from Afghanistan about how to get to Ukraine to fight in the war.

Flight records obtained by the Martin County Sheriff's Office revealed that Routh travelled from Hawaii several times in 2024. These records showed that Routh travelled to San Francisco, California; Phoenix, Arizona; St. Louis, Missouri; Atlanta, Georgia; and Greensboro, North Carolina. All of these airline tickets were purchased by Routh's fiancé, Kathleen Elizabeth Shaffer, who was listed as an editor for Routh's self-published book. Shaffer travelled with Routh as a passenger on some of these flights but on other flights Routh travelled alone. Each flight from Hawaii cost an average of approximately $1,000.

On December 18, it was discovered that the traffic closure caused during Routh's initial arrest led to a car crash that injured Mia Rosalie Monreal, a 6-year-old girl of St. Lucie Village, Florida who was going on a car ride with her family. Monreal fractured her arm and received severe brain damage, and was left in a coma for approximately one month. Monreal's mother told WPTV-TV; "She can’t communicate so even when I talk to her, I don’t even know if she remembers me." As a result of the incident, Routh was additionally charged with attempted felony murder.

On February 20, 2025, Routh's defense team inspected the Trump golf course during a visit arranged by the US Justice Department. After this visit they inspected evidence from the case such as the rifle, which the Justice Department had transported to an FBI field office in Florida.

Following a court filing on March 3, defense attorney Kristy Militello requested for the rifle to be tested. After being questioned by Judge Cannon, Militello responded with; "The rifle is old, and we want our expert to determine if it's operable, if it's accurate, and what kind of distance it can reach." Investigators did not conduct any testing of the rifle the day of the assassination attempt because no shots were fired at the scene. Judge Cannon then promised a ruling on testing the weapon.

On April 7, an indictment by federal prosecutors publicly alleged that Routh had discussed the idea with someone he believed to be a Ukrainian about using a rocket launcher to shoot down Trump's plane. This led to Florida Attorney General James Uthmeier charging Routh with attempted first-degree murder and terrorism.

Evidence from the assassination attempt
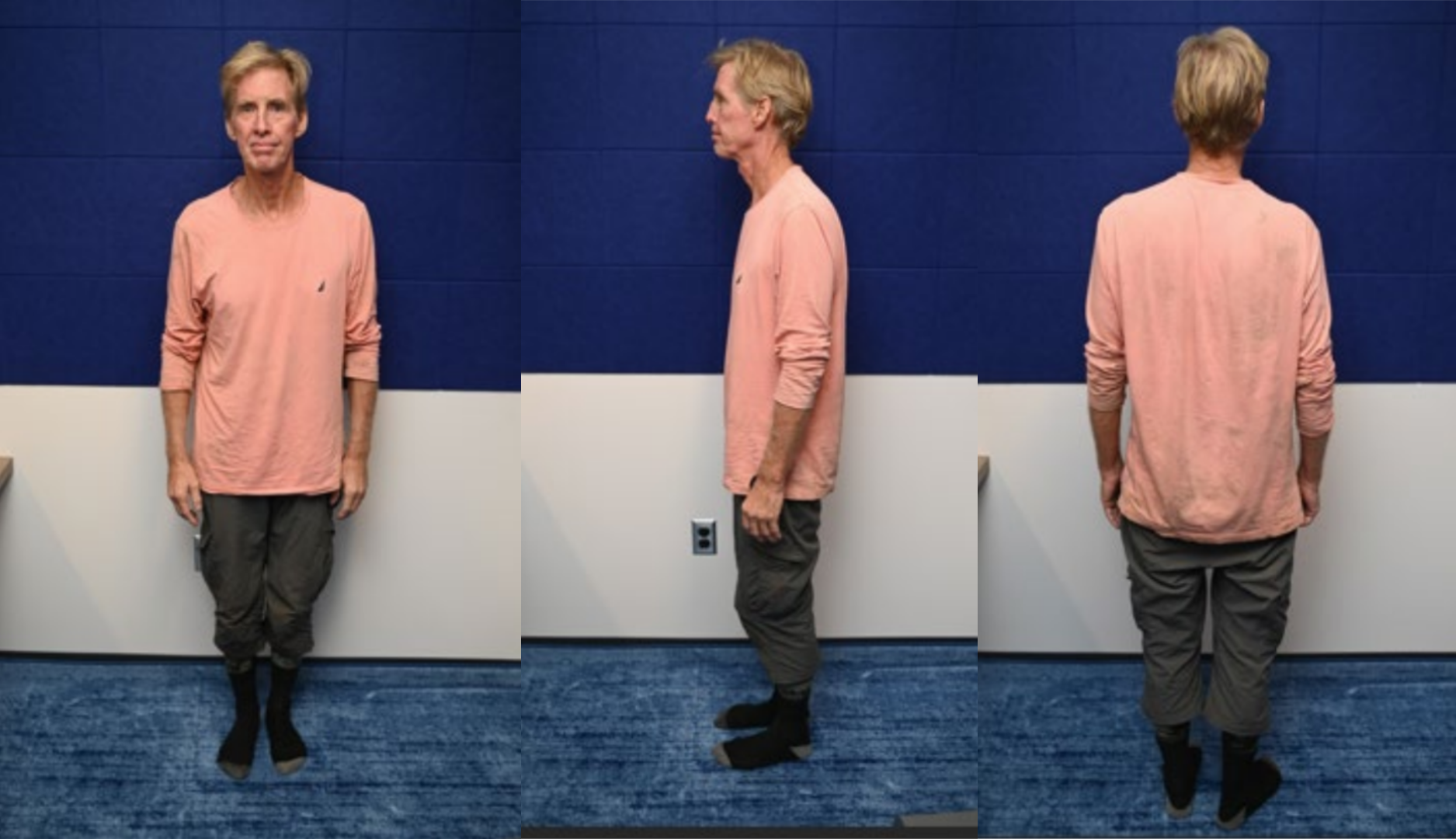
Routh's booking photographs by the Palm Beach County Sheriff's Office

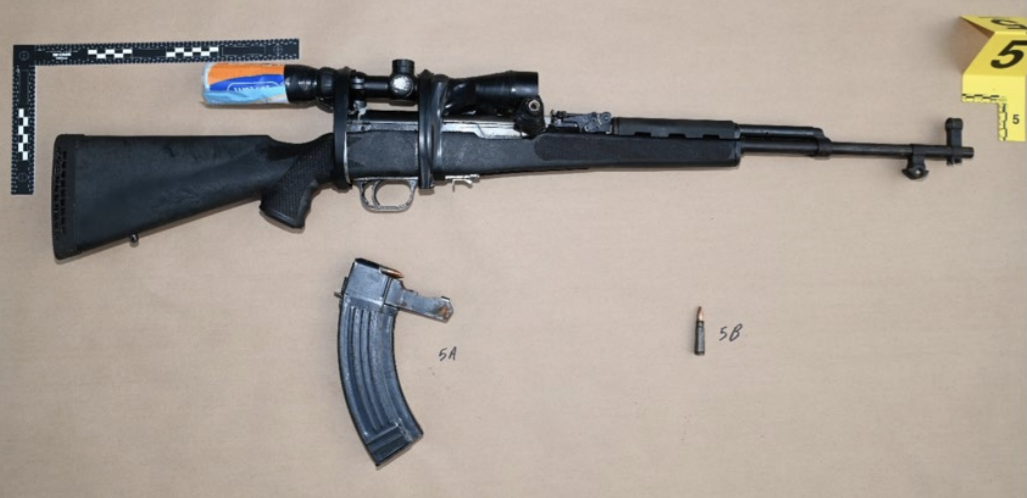
The SKS semi-automatic 7.62x39 caliber rifle used by Routh in the assassination attempt

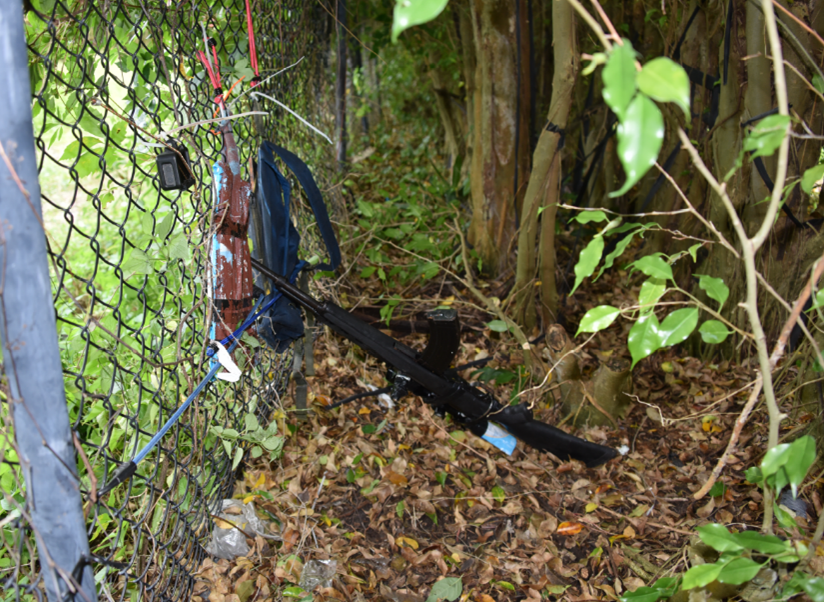
The backpack and rifle used by Routh in the assassination attempt

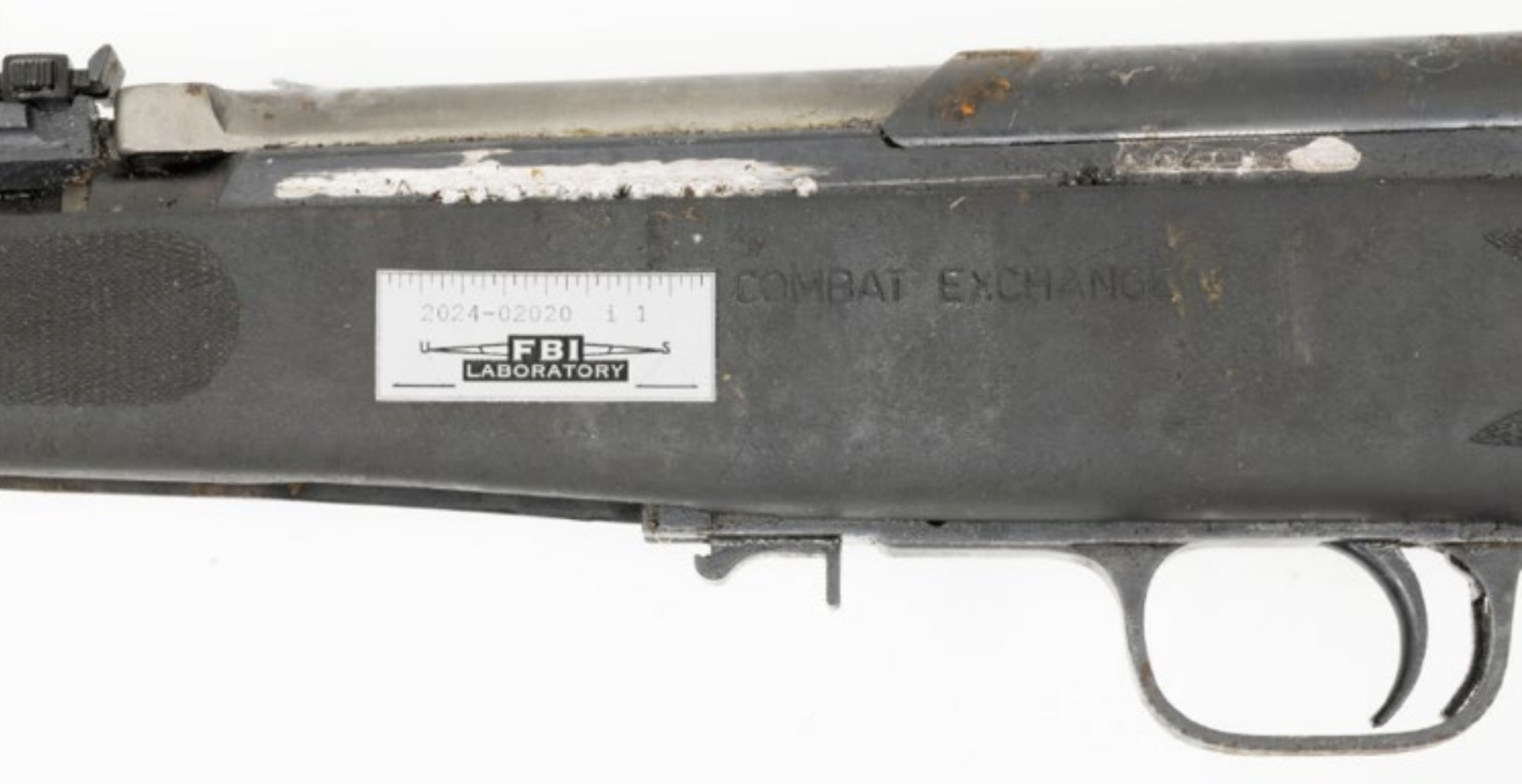
The rifle used by Routh, shown to have its serial number missing

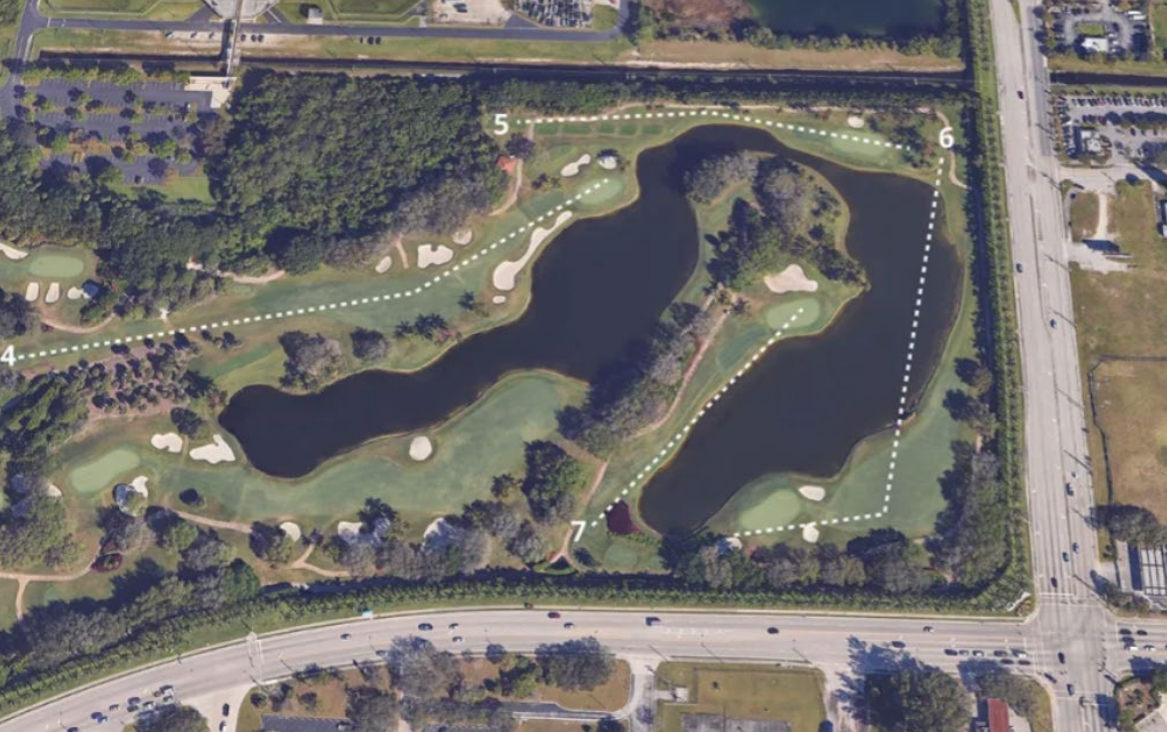
Mapping of the assassination attempt

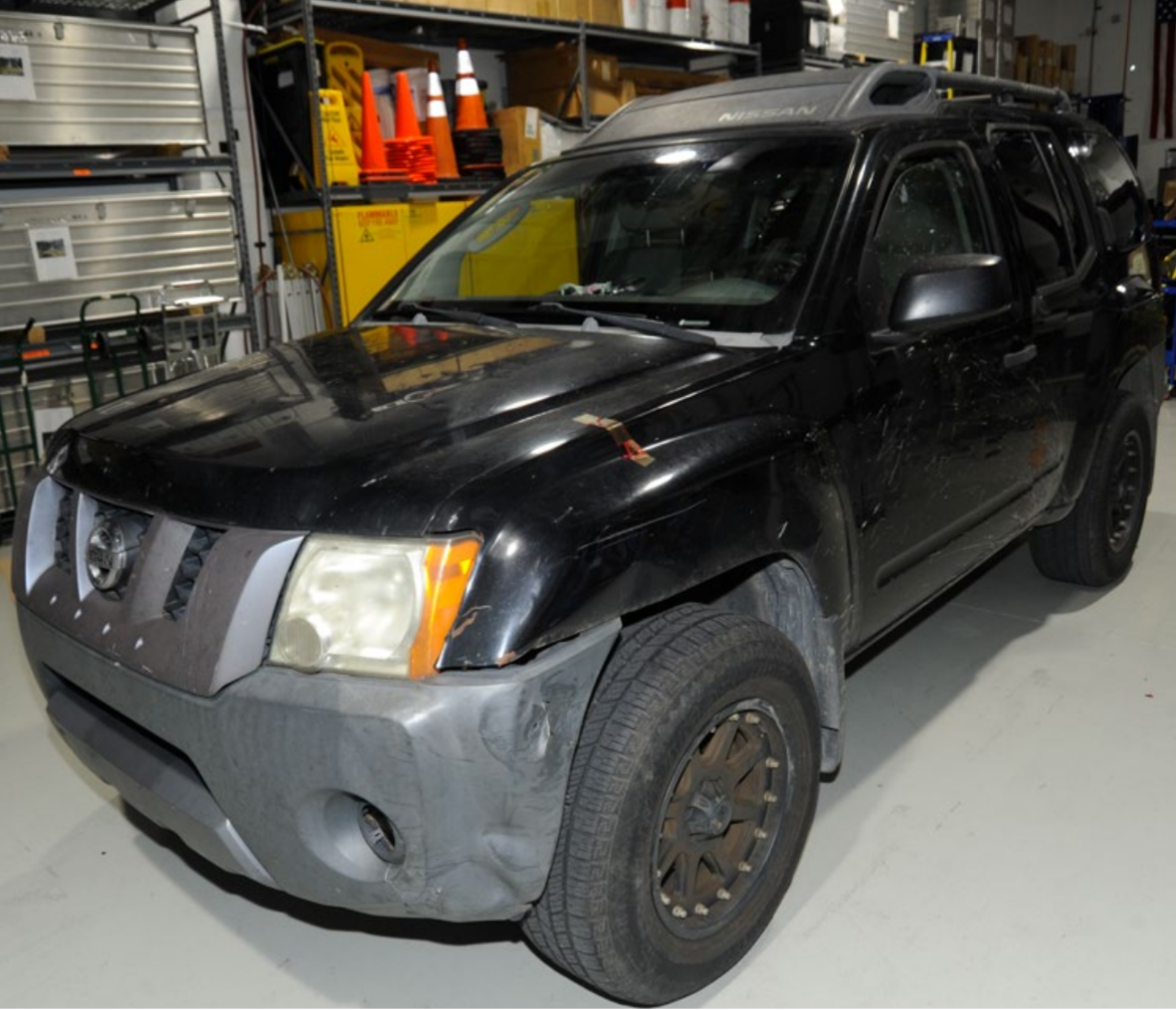
The Nissan Xterra vehicle owned by Routh, which he lived in for a month prior to the assassination attempt and used to flee the initial scene

Exhibit list for Routh's trial

=== Arrest of son ===
As part of investigations following the assassination attempt, authorities searched the Greensboro home of Ryan Routh's eldest son, Oran Alexander Routh. They later discovered images of child sexual abuse on Oran's electronic devices, where he was then promptly arrested. Oran pled guilty to one count of possessing child pornography involving a minor who had not yet reached 12 years of age. He then had an outburst in the court, claiming his arrest on the charges were motivated by "political persecution". On July 25, 2025, Oran was sentenced to seven years in prison with five years of supervised probation.

== Pre-trial ==
Routh's motion to fire his public defenders and represent himself on July 11, 2025

The federal case was assigned to Judge Aileen Cannon, the same Trump-appointed judge who two months earlier had dismissed the federal prosecution of Trump regarding his possession of classified documents. Kristy R. Militello and Renee Michelle Sihvola were assigned as Routh's defense attorneys. On September 16, Routh appeared at his first court hearing while shackled at the Paul G. Rogers Federal Courthouse. On September 30, Routh pleaded not guilty to all five counts brought against him in federal court. The next day, Cannon set a preliminary trial date of November 18. On October 17, Routh's lawyers asked Cannon to recuse herself to avoid the appearance of bias in favor of Trump. However, Cannon refused to step down. As a result, Routh's trial date was moved to February 10, 2025.

On November 4, one day before the 2024 presidential election, Routh sent a letter to a local newsroom stating that if Trump wins the election, it will mark "the end of Democracy and the beginning of a Civil War" and that Trump "will not let go of the power given to him." He also begged the Palm Beach County Sheriff's Office to "help lead the country the way to Democracy." Prosecutors noted that Routh's handwriting of the letter matched the same handwriting as the alleged note written months prior discussing his failure to assassinate Trump, which confirmed Routh wrote the note.

After appearing in federal court for a hearing on December 11, Routh's legal team announced they were considering giving Routh an insanity defense. Public defenders claimed Routh had met with mental health experts and jail mental health professionals at least twice, who all called him "delusional". They also revealed that Routh had written up to forty letters to national news outlets to try and convince them he was innocent, but they were intercepted before being received. Routh went under a psychiatric examination, which confirmed he suffered from narcissistic personality disorder and bipolar II disorder. Militello requested for the trial to be delayed until December 2025. Cannon granted the request in part, setting a new trial date of September 8, 2025.

On April 7, 2025, Routh filed an amended motion to dismiss two of the charges against him, which was 'possession of a firearm by a felon' and 'possession of a firearm with an obliterated serial number'. In the filing, Routh argued that the gun violations were unconstitutional and a violation of the Second Amendment, because the amendment does not regulate the ownership of guns by felons or serial numbers. The motion was rejected by the court two days later on April 9. On the same day, McGee was interviewed by law enforcement. However, he felt pressured because of the intense atmosphere created by the presence of multiple law enforcement agencies. He indicated that at the time he saw Routh fleeing from the area of the golf course, Routh was wearing a light-colored black shirt, rather than the Nautica long-sleeve pink shirt he was wearing during his arrest. This led authorities to believe that Routh changed shirts as he was driving, attempting to disguise himself and evade detection.

On July 24, Routh filed a motion to fire his public defenders and represent himself at trial. Cannon granted the motion, stating that while it was unwise, he had a constitutional right to do so. Cannon also denied his public defender's motion to withdraw, ordering them to remain as standby counsel. The decision followed repeated breakdowns in communication between Routh and his public defenders, who claimed their relationship had become "irreconcilably broken." When asked if he understood federal criminal court procedure, Routh said; "I have a book." Prosecutors expressed concern that Routh may attempt to introduce inflammatory or irrelevant material in court. On the same day, Routh submitted three filings to the court, all of which were filled with sentiments and riddled with typos. In one specific filing, Routh challenged Trump to a golf match, stating; "He wins, he can execute me. I win, I get his job." In the same filing, Routh called Trump's vice president JD Vance a "hillbilly."

On September 2, the trial's final pre-trial hearing was held. The hearing was met with much drama as Routh clashed with the prosecution over his trial attire, which included banned slogan shirts. Judge Cannon had to specifically instruct Routh to dress appropriately for the court. Routh also filed a motion to add ten new witnesses to testify at the trial, including academics and a former girlfriend of his. Judge Cannon denied the motion, calling it "absurd." Routh's attempts to introduce personal letters as evidence were also dismissed.

== Trial ==
Routh's trial began on September 8, 2025, and his jury was selected the following day. During the jury selection, Judge Cannon spent several minutes related to a question submitted to potential jurors by Routh, which he ultimately ended up not asking. The approximated question was; "If you were driving down the street and saw a turtle trying to cross the road, would you stop to help it or continue driving?" Routh explained that he placed an "X" next to the question when he submitted it, because he "did not think it was very good." Approximately 50 witnesses were listed to potentially testify at the trial.

On September 11, Routh delivered an opening argument that began with a series of tangential historical references unrelated to his case, including Adolf Hitler, Vladimir Putin, and the "birth of humanity." At one point, Routh got emotional while speaking. This lasted five minutes before Judge Cannon stopped him and ordered the jury out of the room. She told Routh that in an opening statement, he is only allowed to talk about valid evidence in an objective and non-argumentative way. When the jury returned, Routh began by insulting them, claiming that the case meant "absolutely nothing." Judge Cannon immediately dismissed the jury again and explained that Routh had violated the rules laid out in court and that opening statements were over.

On September 12, FBI agent Aaron Casey presented a 3D reconstruction of the assassination attempt to the court. On September 15, the FBI confirmed that Routh's DNA matched the fingerprints found on the SKS rifle that he left behind at the scene of the assassination attempt. Photos of inside Routh's vehicle, as well as gas station surveillance footage and receipts, were also shown to the court that day, in which authorities revealed that Routh spent the last month prior to the assassination attempt living in a parking lot of a local truck stop in the Palm Beach County area while conducting surveillance. During this time, Routh went under the alias "Brian Wilson" and gave that name to truck stop employees and wrote it on a tag he kept on his Xterra while parked there and on a piece of paper found at the time of his initial arrest. Routh additionally occasionally stopped by a local Marathon gas station for gas, food, and other supplies during this time.

On September 20, Routh filed a motion to the court to drop all of the charges against him, claiming that since the gun was never fired, prosecutors have "yet to prove" an assassination attempt on Trump took place. He also argued that the area outside Trump's golf course was a public right of way, giving anyone the right to be there with a weapon. On September 22, Routh called three witnesses to the stand, a firearms expert and two of his longtime friends, before he rested his case. He also told Judge Cannon that he would not be taking the stand to testify in his own case, a notion he had previously considered. By that point, 38 of the 50 witnesses planned to testify at the trial ended up testifying, including Robert Fercano, Tommy McGee and the Plata brothers. Routh's statements and arguments totaled about 42 minutes.

=== Verdict ===
The full jury verdict

On September 23, Routh was found guilty on all federal counts. The jury deliberated for around two and a half hours. While the verdict was being read in the courtroom, Routh grabbed a black pen and repeatedly attempted to stab himself in the neck, before Marshals tackled him to the ground and picked him up, before dragging him out of the courtroom. Routh's daughter, Sara, immediately begged her father to not hurt himself and began swearing in front of the jury before storming out of the courtroom. Routh returned to the courtroom soon after while handcuffed, appearing to be uninjured, with no blood visible on his white shirt and not appearing to have succeeded in harming himself. The pen Routh used was a flexible model intended to prevent it from being used as a weapon.

Following the trial's conclusion, Sara would publicly speak to the media about the assassination attempt for the first time. She denied that her father was responsible for the assassination attempt, claiming the media was "spreading lies" about him. Sara called her father her "best friend" and that it "wasn't in her father's nature" to commit such a crime. Sara also brought up Routh's stabbing attempt in the court, saying; "Our democracy is crumbling right in front of our eyes, and no one's doing anything about it. And my dad tried to bring awareness to that."

=== Sentencing ===
Due to his attempt to stab himself during the verdict, Routh was moved to the medical dorm of the St. Lucie County jail under suicide observation. On October 22, the Federal Public Defender's Office requested the court to appoint an attorney to represent Routh during the sentencing. They cited that Routh regretted representing himself at the trial, and that he wanted an attorney to represent him during his sentencing. The Department of Justice stated that appointing an attorney would not allow Routh to reargue his trial or question any previous court rulings.

On October 29, Routh filed a motion asking a federal judge to recommend he either be imprisoned in a state that authorized assisted suicide, or to be traded as a prisoner to either Iran or China. He also wrote in a jail letter to his daughter Sara and his youngest son Adam that while he "had the chance" to kill Trump while he was hiding in shrubbery at the golf course, he "couldn't go through with it." Sara later told WPBF that she believed her father was telling the truth.

On December 15, Routh’s motion for an attorney was granted, and the scheduled sentencing hearing, originally set for December 18, was delayed to February 2026 to allow time for counsel to be appointed. In the motion asking for counsel, Routh offered Trump to "take out his frustrations on [his] face," which Judge Cannon described as making a "mockery" of the proceedings while still allowing legal representation.

On February 4, 2026, Routh appeared in court for his sentencing. His defense attorney, Martin Roth, sought a reduced sentence of 27 years, citing his age and other factors, however Cannon rejected this request. The attorney also argued that Routh did not have a fair trial because he represented himself, even though Routh made that decision after repeated warnings about the potential consequences. Routh was sentenced to life in prison without the possibility of parole, plus a mandatory additional seven years for a firearm offense. Routh remained calm as the sentence was read. Before he was escorted out of court, Routh smiled and blew a kiss toward his siblings seated in the courtroom. On March 20, Routh was transferred to the USP Victorville in California to serve his sentence. He was reportedly being kept in solitary confinement with no television, no computer access and limited human contact. On September 27, 2026, Routh was transferred to ADX Florence in Florence, Colorado.

=== Appeal ===
On February 5, 2026, only one day after his sentencing, Routh filed a motion through his attorney stating that he wanted to appeal his life sentence.

== Conspirators ==
=== Tina Cooper and Ronnie Oxendine ===
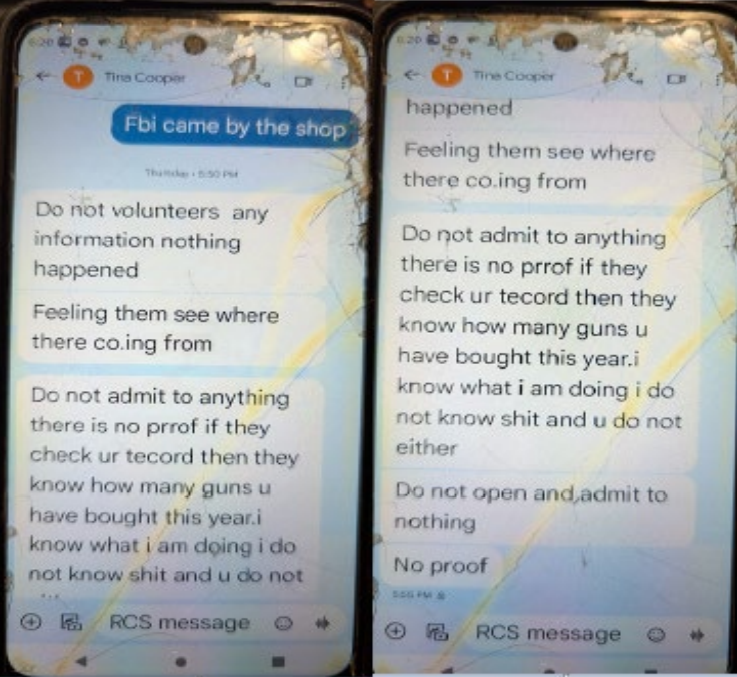
The message thread between Cooper and Oxendine about obstructing the FBI investigation; September 19, 2024.

From July to August 2024, Routh conspired with a former employee of his, 58-year-old Tina Brown Cooper (born c. 1966), and her boss at the time, 54-year-old Ronnie Jay Oxendine (born c. December 1969), to obtain a rifle as part of his assassination plot.

In July 2024, Routh called Cooper saying he would soon be visiting Greensboro and that he needed help buying an AK-47 for one of his children, as he couldn't obtain one himself due to his criminal record. Cooper agreed to assist him and later reached out to Oxendine asking him if he was willing to sell her the one he owned, claiming it was for her grandson as she initially didn't want Oxendine knowing it was for Routh. Oxendine said he did not want to sell his AK-47 and instead offered to sell Cooper an SKS rifle. Oxendine later called Cooper saying he was ready to sell the rifle, where they both arranged a plan to meet at Oxendine's roofing company, Oxendine and Son Roofing Company, for the sale.

On August 2, at approximately 10:00 a.m., Oxendine arrived at his place of business to sell the rifle to Cooper, where she and her daughter later arrived with Routh. He was surprised to see Routh arrive, as they were both owners of local roofing companies throughout the 1990's, however they had not spoken to each other in approximately ten years. Cooper told Oxendine that the SKS rifle was actually for Routh. Routh paid Oxendine $350 in cash for the rifle and paid Cooper $100 in cash for arranging the sale. Oxendine later asked Cooper why she did not tell him the rifle was for Routh, which she responded by saying that she thought Oxendine would've had an issue with Routh being the one receiving the rifle. The rifle's serial number was removed by Routh shortly after. Authorities later confirmed this rifle was the same one used by Routh in the assassination attempt.

On September 15, when Oxendine learned about the assassination attempt through his sister, he contacted Cooper and told her about it. She told Oxendine that she was going to delete all traces of Routh off of all her electronic devices in an attempt to cover up her involvement. When authorities visited Oxendine's place of business on September 19, Cooper instructed Oxendine to refuse to cooperate with the FBI. Cooper was later interviewed by The Independent, claiming she had not spoken to Routh since 2004, where she claimed he abruptly fired her after a falling out.

On September 22, FBI agents interviewed Oxendine and Cooper as part of their investigation. They first interviewed Oxendine in Climax, North Carolina. Oxendine told the agents that he met Routh approximately 30 years earlier. He added that he and Routh weren't friends. Oxendine falsely told the agents that around this time, Routh had pawned an SKS rifle to him for approximately $300. After immense pressure, Oxendine later admitted that he lied in order to minimize his role in the assassination attempt. He additionally admitted to his role in the sale of the rifle to Routh the month prior.

Later the same day, the agents interviewed Cooper in Greensboro. She told them that she met Routh in 1999 while she was an employee of his roofing business in Greensboro. She said she became aware of Routh's lengthy criminal record in 2002, after his conviction for possessing a weapon of mass death and destruction. Through Facebook, Cooper had several conversations with Routh between 2014 and 2022. Additionally, Cooper told the agents that she was "guilty" of assisting Routh, whom she knew was a convicted felon, in acquiring a firearm. Cooper provided multiple inconsistent stories regarding the transfer of the rifle, which she eventually confessed to lying about out of fear of prosecution. She also admitted to instructing Oxendine to mislead the investigation. A review of Cooper's device confirmed that she had deleted traces of Routh off her cellphone, including call logs and text messages. The agents then asked Cooper if she had instructed any other person to lie to the FBI or mislead their investigation, which she denied on multiple occasions. Both Oxendine and Cooper told the agents that they had no prior knowledge of Routh’s intentions to assassinate Trump.

Both Cooper and Oxendine were both indicted in March 2025, and were arrested the following month. Cooper pleaded guilty to firearm trafficking for her role in the assassination attempt, while Oxendine pleaded guilty to possessing an unregistered firearm after police found an unregistered short-barreled shotgun in a storage unit he owned. Cooper faces 15 years in prison, while Oxendine faces 10 years in prison. Both of them additionally face a $250,000 fine.

On September 17, 2025, Oxendine testified as a witness at Routh's trial as part of a plea deal. He detailed how he and Cooper arranged the sale of the rifle to Routh the year prior. Routh apologized to Oxendine and offered to serve part of his prison sentence, saying; "I know you're extremely mad at me." This prompted Judge Cannon to intervene and warn Routh about violating his time on the lectern. Cooper refused to testify as a witness at the trial.

=== Alleged conspirators ===
The April 7th indictment

On April 7, 2025, an indictment by federal prosecutors alleged that Routh had a conversation on WhatsApp with a man from Mexico saved in his phone as "Ramiro" on February 29, 2024 about potentially smuggling an Afghanistani migrant family into the United States from Mexico. The indictment claimed that the man spoke mostly Spanish, and that Routh occasionally used Google Translate to communicate with him. Their next alleged conversation occurred seven months later on September 12, where Routh allegedly sent a message stating that he planned on fleeing to Mexico City following the assassination attempt, with "Ramiro" allegedly responding that he would see Routh then and that he was located four hours outside of Mexico City. Routh allegedly replied that he would call "Ramiro" once he knew for sure whether or not he’d meet him.

Routh also allegedly sought to obtain military weapons in August 2024 as part of his assassination plot from someone he believed to be a Ukrainian. Routh allegedly told this associate through WhatsApp to send him a rocket-propelled grenade or a stinger, stating that he "needed equipment so that Trump couldn't get elected." Routh also allegedly discussed the idea of using a rocket launcher to shoot down Trump's plane.

== Reactions ==
President Joe Biden and Vice President Kamala Harris, Trump's opponent in the 2024 presidential election, were briefed on the incident. The White House released a statement saying: "The president and vice president have been briefed about the security incident at the Trump International Golf Course, where former President Trump was golfing. They are relieved to know that he is safe." In a separate statement, Harris said: "I have been briefed on reports of gunshots fired near former President Trump and his property in Florida, and I am glad he is safe. Violence has no place in America."

Shortly after the shooting, Elon Musk, executive chairman of Twitter, quote-retweeted a post on the site which asked "Why they want [sic] to kill Donald Trump?", responding that "no one is even trying to assassinate Biden/Kamala". Although he initially defended his wording, Musk deleted the tweet following widespread condemnation, claiming the next day that his remarks were intended as a joke. The White House issued a statement calling Musk's comment "irresponsible", writing that "violence should only be condemned, never encouraged or joked about".

== Misinformation and conspiracy theories ==
The fact that Trump's second assassination attempt occurred only two months after his first, has also spawned conspiracy theories. Some theories argued the event was staged, or that the Secret Service intentionally allowed Routh to get within range of the golf course. Due to Routh's public support for Ukraine, including his efforts to recruit foreign fighters, some speculated he was an intelligence operative.

== See also ==
- Attempted assassination of Donald Trump in Pennsylvania
- 2026 Mar-a-Lago shooting
- List of United States presidential assassination attempts and plots
- Security incidents involving Donald Trump
