= Ryan Routh =

Attempted assassin of Donald Trump (born 1966)

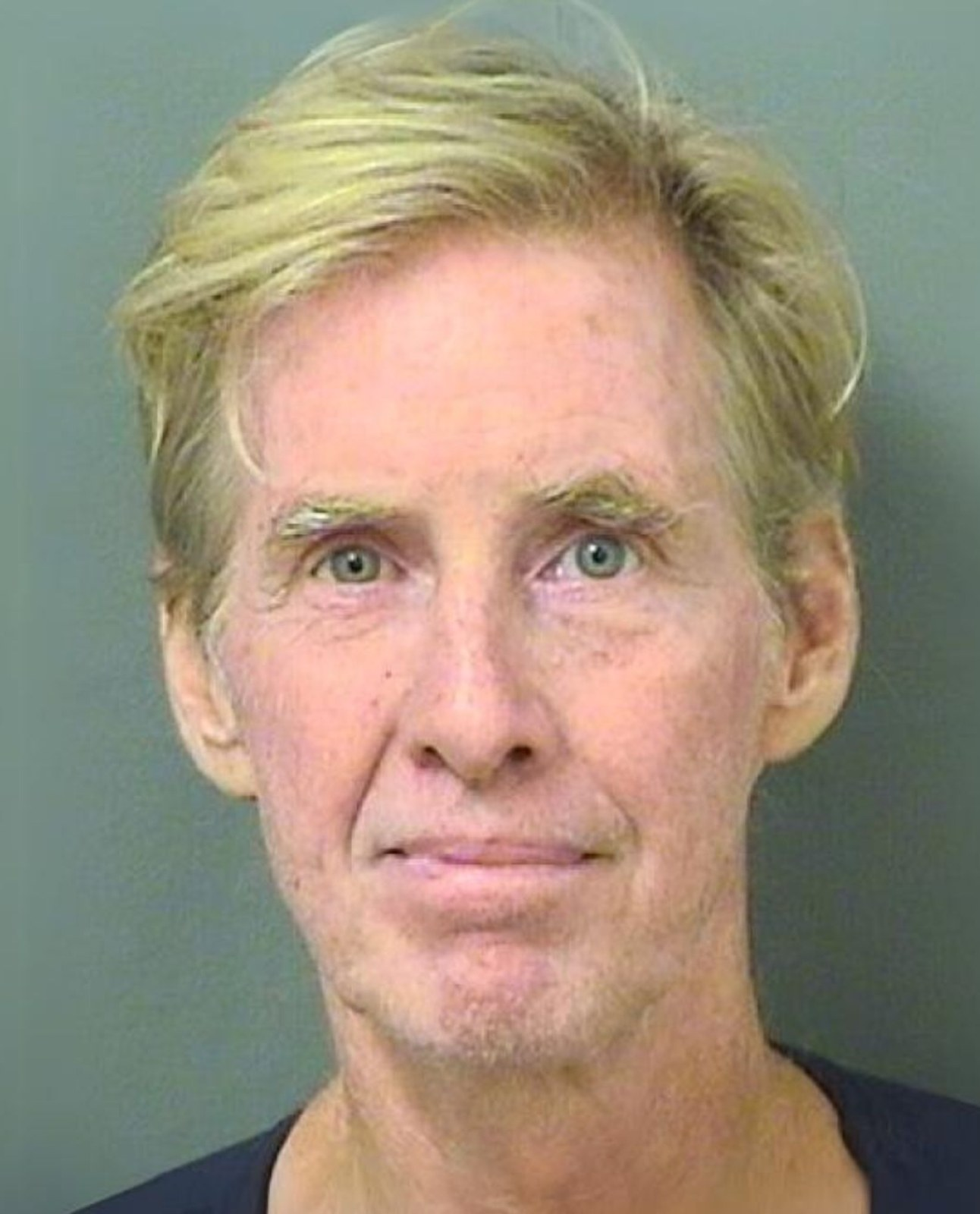
- Routh's mug shot after his arrest in 2024
- Born: Ryan Wesley Routh; February 18, 1966 (age 60); Greensboro, North Carolina, U.S.
- Education: UNC Greensboro (dropped out); North Carolina A&T State University (dropped out)
- Known for: Attempted assassination of Donald Trump in Florida
- Political party: Independent (since 2002); Democratic (1988–2002)
- Spouse: Lora Frances Wilson (m. 1989; div. 2003)
- Partner: Kathleen Elizabeth Shaffer (2017–2024)
- Children: 3
- Motive: Prevent Trump from winning the 2024 presidential election
- Convictions: 5 counts (Note: Federal: Attempted assassination of a major presidential candidate; Possessing a firearm in furtherance of a crime of violence; Assaulting a federal officer; Possession of a firearm by a convicted felon; Possession of a firearm with the serial number removed)
- Criminal charges: 3 counts (Note: State: Attempted felony murder; Attempted first-degree murder; Terrorism)
- Penalty: Federal: Life in prison without the possibility of parole plus 7 years to run consecutively

Details
- Date: September 15, 2024
- Location: Trump International Golf Club, West Palm Beach
- Weapon: SKS semiautomatic 7.62x39 caliber rifle
- Imprisoned at: ADX Florence

Signature
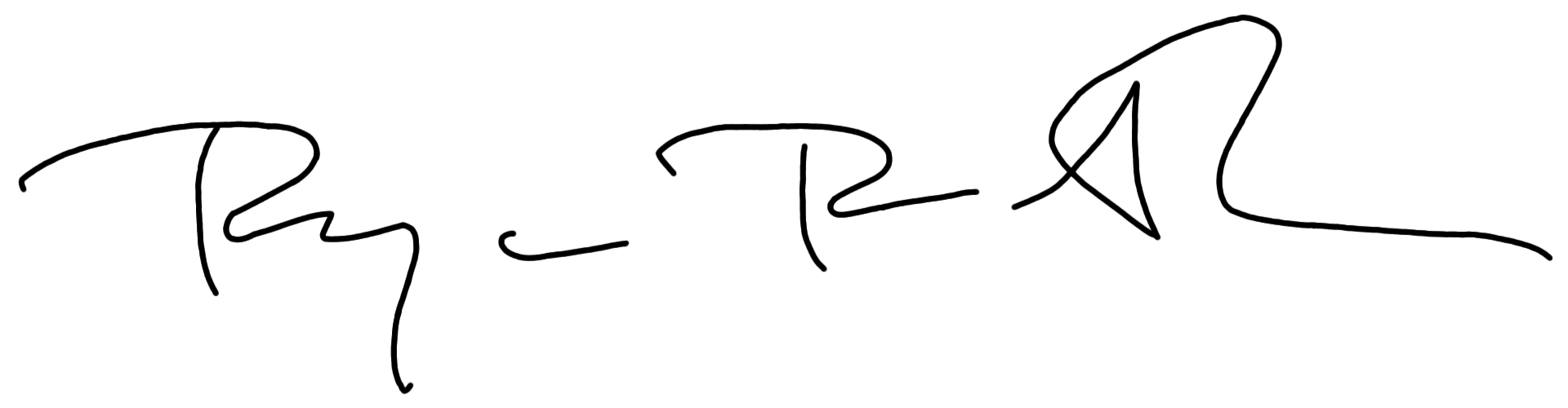

Ryan Wesley Routh (Note: Several news outlets have claimed his name is pronounced /ˈraɪənˈwɛsliˈraʊθ/ RYE-ən WES-lee ROWTH. However, Routh himself confirmed it is actually pronounced /ˈraɪənˈwɛsliˈruːθ/ RYE-ən WES-lee ROOTH.) (born February 18, 1966) is an American former roofer who attempted to assassinate then-former U.S. President Donald Trump on September 15, 2024. Routh was attempting to assassinate Trump to prevent him from winning the 2024 presidential election. The incident occurred two months after Trump survived a previous assassination attempt while speaking at a campaign rally near Butler, Pennsylvania.

On September 15, 2024 at 1:59 AM EDT, just outside the fence of Trump's Florida golf course, Routh hid in shrubbery holding an SKS-style rifle. At 1:31 PM, Routh pointed his weapon through the fence line, approximately 400 yards (350 meters) from Trump. A Secret Service agent noticed this and fired four rounds towards Routh, who fled and was later captured in Martin County.

Routh was indicted on a total of five federal charges, including attempting to assassinate a presidential candidate. Florida added three state charges, including attempted felony murder. Routh pleaded not guilty to all the charges. Two conspirators who helped Routh obtain the rifle were arrested and charged. In July 2025, Routh chose to fire his public defenders and represent himself. His trial began on September 8, 2025. Two weeks later, on September 23, he was found guilty on all five federal counts. While the verdict was being read in the courtroom, Routh grabbed a pen and attempted to stab himself in the neck. He was instead tackled by marshals. On February 4, 2026, he was sentenced to life in prison without the possibility of parole.

== Early life ==
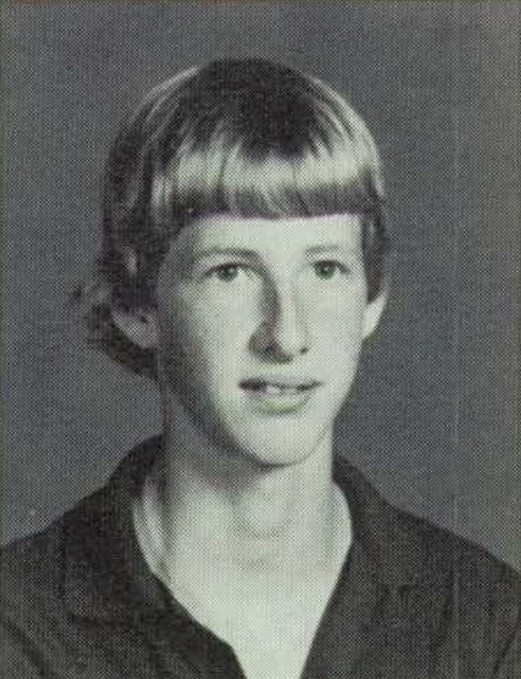
Routh's 1983 high school junior year yearbook photo.

Ryan Wesley Routh was born on February 18, 1966, in Greensboro, North Carolina, where he was a resident for most of his life. He has a sister named Nancy Meyers (née Routh). He attended Guilford Junior High School (now Guilford Middle School) in the late 1970's. He earned an Eagle Scout award in 1980. He attended Northwest Guilford High School where he graduated in 1984. However, on Facebook, Routh claimed to have graduated from Grimsley High School. A former classmate of his said that Routh was social and had school friends, but he was not popular. He enrolled at University of North Carolina at Greensboro in 1988, then dropped out in 1990. In 1995, Routh attended North Carolina A&T State University for two semesters, dropping out before finishing a degree program.

In January 1989, Routh married Lora Frances Wilson, with whom he had two sons and a daughter. Routh's former Greensboro neighbors saw Routh and his family as "weird" and "potentially dangerous". In the early 1990s, Routh opened a roofing business called United Roofing, hiring 90 employees. He abandoned the business in the early 2000's. Routh divorced Lora on March 10, 2003. Routh's daughter and youngest son lived with him full time after the divorce, while his eldest son lived with Lora full time. Routh tried to get a skate park built near Greensboro in the mid 2000's.

On April 2, 1991, Routh chased Terrance Bryant, a suspected rapist, around an office building. Bryant was wanted for a string of burglaries, assaults and robberies in both Greensboro and New York. Bryant was arrested that evening and is serving a life sentence. For confronting Bryant, Routh was honored as a "super citizen" and awarded a "Law Enforcement Oscar" by the Greensboro chapter of the International Union of Police Associations.

In 2018, Routh moved to Kaʻaʻawa, Hawaii with his fiancé, Kathleen Elizabeth Shaffer, and his daughter and youngest son. There, they started a shed-building business called Camp Box Honolulu. Routh and his eldest son had a falling out and had not talked prior to the assassination attempt, although afterwards he said that Routh was "a loving and caring father, and honest, hardworking man" and that "it doesn't sound like the man I know to do anything crazy, much less violent."

=== Legal issues ===
Routh had a lengthy criminal record, spanning from 1984 to 2016. Routh had been convicted of over a hundred criminal offenses, and had been arrested at least eight times. Routh typically received parole or probation for these offenses, with no prison time. Routh had further been ordered to pay tens of thousands of dollars to plaintiffs related to more than 200 civil lawsuits.

In 1984, Routh was charged for failing to report an accident. Throughout the 1990s, he was charged multiple times for tax delinquencies and fraud. In 1997, Routh was charged with larceny after he was caught stealing.

On December 15, 2002, Routh was pulled over for driving with a revoked license, after his license was revoked in November 2001. He then put his hand on a machine gun he had with him, alarming the officer, before driving to his place of business, where he barricaded himself inside. After a three-hour stand-off, Routh surrendered and was convicted for possessing an illegal weapon, possessing a firearm, resisting, delaying, and obstructing a law enforcement officer, and driving with a revoked license. Routh pleaded guilty to all charges, and was sentenced to sixty months' probation. He surrendered his weapons to the police who destroyed them. Routh agreed to undergo a mental health evaluation and accept recommended treatments. Soon after, he was arrested for threatening to blow up the police department. After the assassination attempt, the officer who initially pulled over Routh stated; "I figured he was either dead or in prison by now. I had no clue that he had moved on and was continuing his escapades."

In 2003, he was convicted for driving without a license, carrying a concealed weapon and involvement in a hit and run crash. On February 10, 2010, Routh was convicted of possessing stolen goods after Greensboro police searched three warehouses Routh owned and found more than 100 stolen tools, building materials, and other items from sites where he worked as a roofer. He was again sentenced to probation. In 2014, Routh was arrested for failing to appear in court.

In 2019, Routh was subject to an investigation over a tip to the FBI alleging that he was in possession of a firearm. Later that same year, he was removed from a property for allegedly squatting. In 2021, Routh called the police on a resident of a property where he was working, claiming the resident had punched him in the nose.

=== Claimed activities related to Ukraine ===
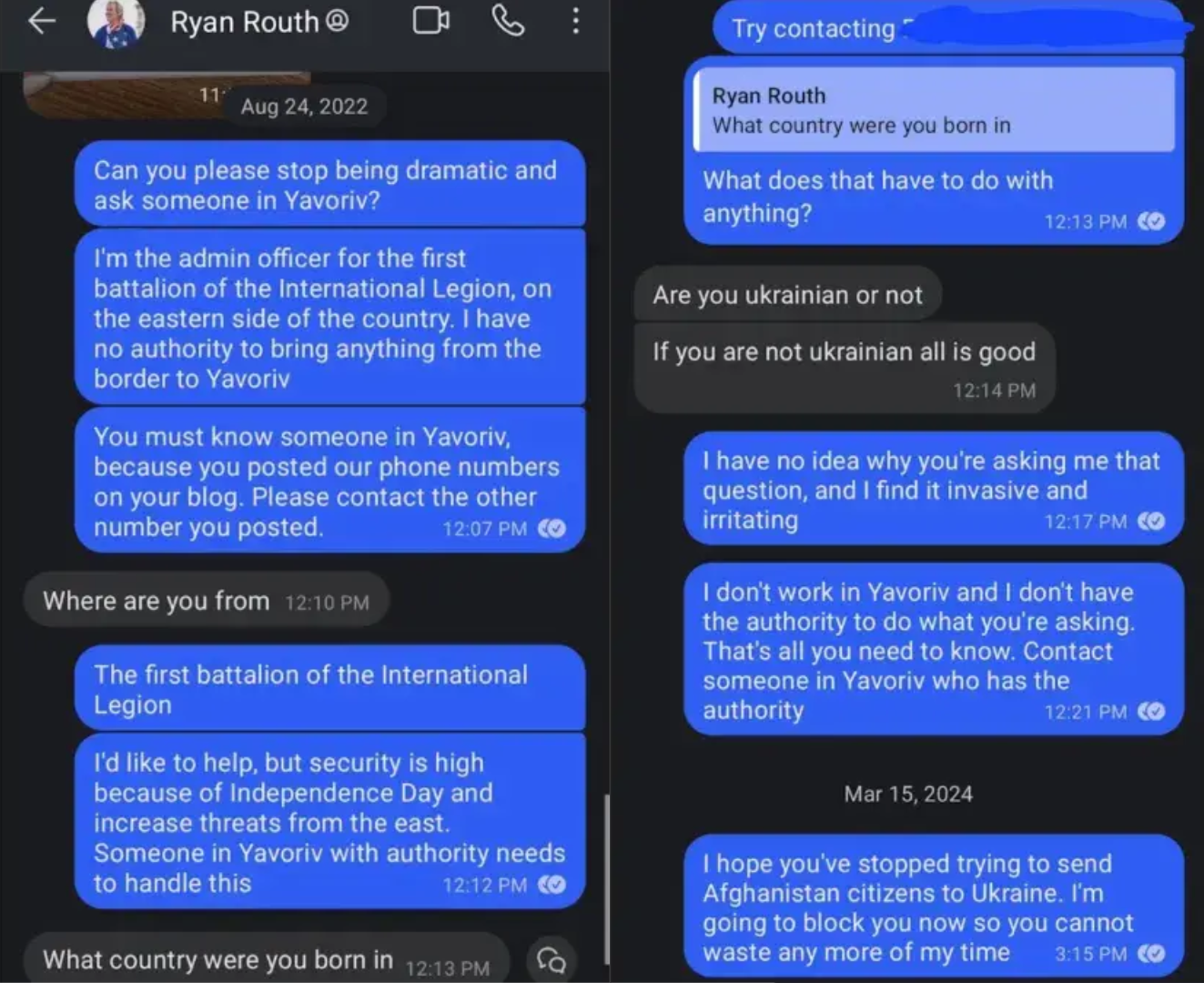
Messages between Routh and Aschenbrenner though the messaging app Signal, 2022

Routh claimed on his social media accounts and in 2022 interviews to have made efforts to recruit foreign soldiers for Ukraine in its war against Russia. At various times Routh claimed to have fought and to have not fought in Ukraine. Routh claimed that he flew to Ukraine to join the army after Russia's 2022 invasion, but learned that he was "not an ideal candidate" because he was in his mid-50s with no military experience. Later in 2022, Routh said that after his rejection, he began recruiting volunteers for the Ukrainian military. Routh complained of roadblocks to Ukraine admitting foreign fighters, stating, "Ukraine is very often hard to work with, they're afraid that anybody and everybody is a Russian spy". Routh was filmed at an April 2022 protest in Kyiv. Routh was reported in 2022 and 2023 to have been associated with the International Volunteer Center, a Lviv-based non-profit assisting foreign fighters. In 2024, after the assassination attempt, the group's founder, Ian Netupsky, said that Routh had never been affiliated with the organization.

A former volunteer for Ukraine's International Legion, Evelyn Aschenbrenner, branded Routh as "delusional" and a "liar" over his claims that he recruited for the Ukrainian organization, saying Routh was "not, and never has been, associated with the International Legion or the Ukrainian Armed Forces". Aschenbrenner said of Routh, "He was combative. He was argumentative. He refused repeatedly to understand basic army policy", adding, "There was delusions of grandeur and [he was] very disconnected from reality." The International Legion for the Defense of Ukraine said in a statement that Routh had "never been part of, associated with, or linked" to it.

Chelsea Walsh, a travel nurse who had met Routh in Ukraine, described Routh as "a threat to others" and a "ticking time bomb", and notified a Homeland Security agent upon her return from Ukraine. She claimed that Routh decided to dedicate his life to protecting Ukraine upon first hearing about the war in 2022, and that he would become "vengeful" and "angry" if he did not get his way. Sometime in 2023, Walsh reported Routh to the FBI. Routh claimed to her to have organized a protest outside President Volodymyr Zelenskyy's home and that he was jailed for it. Walsh repeated her concerns to the FBI and Interpol. In November 2023, Routh returned to Hawaii.

On September 12, 2024, three days before the assassination attempt, Routh exchanged messages with British-trained commandos from Afghanistan about recruitment to the Ukraine military.

== Assassination attempt ==
Routh being apprehended following the assassination attempt

On September 15, 2024, Trump was golfing at Trump International Golf Club in West Palm Beach with his friend and donor Steve Witkoff. Trump was walking along the fifth hole when Robert Fercano, a Secret Service agent, conducted a sweep of the sixth hole ahead of him for any threats. During the sweep, Routh was seen aiming a rifle at Fercano while hiding in shrubs approximately 400 yards (370 m) away. The position in which Routh had been is well-known as a spot frequently used by paparazzi to photograph Trump at his golf course. At 1:31 p.m. EDT (approximately 12 hours after Routh's 1:59 a.m. arrival), Fercano, having seen the rifle barrel move, fired four rounds towards Routh, who then dropped his weapon and fled in a vehicle. After the shot was fired, Trump was escorted off the course by his Secret Service protective detail. Routh did not have a clear line of sight on Trump and did not fire his gun. Tommy Craig McGee, a witness who was driving to a nearby furniture store at the time of the incident, saw him running out of the woods and into a black car. He quickly took three photos and a video of Routh's vehicle, assisting authorities in tracking it down. The golf course was locked down shortly after the incident, and no injuries were reported.

After Routh fled the scene, a "be on the lookout" was issued to law enforcement with details about the suspect's car, a black Nissan Xterra SUV. At 2:22 p.m, after pulling over the vehicle on Interstate 95 in Martin County, Martin County Sheriff's Office deputies Nicholas Shaw and Gedeon Brenovil forced Routh out of the car and arrested him at gunpoint. According to the Palm Beach County Sheriff's Office, Routh was detained as a person of interest while he was driving northbound on Interstate 95 from Palm Beach County. The sheriff's units "waited [for] a while" to stop the vehicle to avoid engaging in a high-speed chase. Seventeen burner cell-phones were found inside Routh's vehicle. An SKS-style rifle with a removed serial number, a scope, two backpacks containing ceramic tiles that could deflect a bullet, a plastic bag containing food, and a GoPro camera, were recovered at the scene. Routh was unarmed at the time of his arrest.

=== "Dear World" letter ===
Lazaro and Samuel Plata, two brothers formerly employed by Routh, contacted law enforcement on September 18, stating that Routh had dropped off a box containing a 12-page letter at their house in April 2024, several months before the incident. The two opened the box after the incident. Improvised destructive device components, burner cellphones, and .50 caliber ammunition was recovered from the box. On September 23, 2024, the Department of Justice released the first page of the letter, which stated:

Dear World, this was an assassination attempt on Donald Trump but I am so sorry I failed you. I tried my best and gave it all the gumption I could muster. It is up to you now to finish the job; and I will offer $150,000 to whomever [sic] can complete the job. Everyone across the globe from the youngest to the oldest know that Trump is unfit to be anything, much less a U.S president. U.S presidents must at bare minimum embody the moral fabric that is America and be kind, caring and selfless and always stand for humanity. Trump fails to understand any of-

According to authorities, the letter indicated that Routh had planned the assassination attempt as early as February 2024, and acknowledged months in advance that he might fail.

=== Charges ===
Routh was sent to the Federal Detention Center, Miami. Here, he had a television in his cell, access to email and regular trips to court. On the day of his arraignment, he was seen smiling and laughing with his lawyer. Footage of his arrest was released.

Kristy R. Militello and Renee Michelle Sihvola were assigned to be Routh's defense attorneys. Routh was charged on September 24 with attempted assassination of a presidential candidate, assaulting a federal officer, and possessing a firearm in furtherance of a crime of violence.

On December 18, it was discovered that the traffic disruption during Routh's initial arrest led to a car crash that injured Mia Rosalie Monreal, a 6-year-old girl of St. Lucie Village, Florida. Monreal fractured her arm and received severe brain damage, and was in a coma for approximately one month. Monreal's mother stated, "She can't communicate so even when I talk to her, I don't even know if she remembers me." The incident led to an additional charge; attempted felony murder.

On April 7, 2025, Florida state prosecutors indicted Routh for discussing the idea with someone he believed to be a Ukrainian about using a rocket launcher to shoot down Trump's plane. Florida Attorney General James Uthmeier charged Routh with attempted first-degree murder and terrorism.

=== Arrest of son ===
Authorities searched the Greensboro home of Ryan Routh's oldest son, 35-year-old Oran Alexander Routh, who had been arrested twice in 2016 for assault and interfering with police. They discovered images of child sex abuse on his electronic devices, leading to his arrest. Oran pled guilty to one count of possessing child pornography. He had an outburst in the court, claiming his arrest was "political persecution", earning a sentence of seven years in federal prison with five years of supervised probation.

== Pre-trial ==
Routh's motion to fire his public defenders and represent himself on July 11, 2025

On September 23, 2024, the Department of Justice publicized the first page of a 12-page note written by Routh months prior to the incident in which he described an "assassination attempt" and offered a bounty for the killing of Trump. In the letter, Routh offered $150,000 to "whomever [sic] can complete the job".

Evidence included a handwritten list of venues where Trump had appeared or was expected to appear, from August through October. One day before the election, Routh sent a letter to a local newsroom stating that if Trump wins the election, it will mark "the end of Democracy and the beginning of a Civil War" and that Trump "will not let go of the power given to him". He challenged the Palm Beach County Sheriff's Office to "help lead the country the way to Democracy". Prosecutors claimed that Routh's handwriting of the letter matched the earlier note. Cell phone data indicating that Routh stalked Trump near his golf course and his Mar-a-Lago residence repeatedly between August 18 to September 15. The car that Routh was arrested in had stolen license plates. Routh may have been living in the car for some time.

Routh pled not guilty on September 30. A preliminary hearing was set by Judge Aileen Cannon for November 18. On October 17, Routh's lawyers asked Cannon to recuse herself to avoid the appearance of bias in favor of Trump, due to Cannon's dismissal of the federal prosecution of Trump regarding his possession of classified documents three months prior. However, Cannon refused to step down.

On November 26, Routh addressed a note to Politico, in which he criticized both the Republican and Democratic parties, claiming that they conspired against independent candidates. Routh compared himself to Thomas Crooks, the perpetrator of the previous assassination attempt of Trump, because they were both "ready to die for freedom and democracy". He repeatedly raised the prospect of another civil war. Prior to sending the note, Routh told a prison guard that independent politicians are better candidates. He referred to himself as the "Trump Alleged Shooter".

After a December 11 hearing, Routh's legal team announced they were considering an insanity defense. Public defenders claimed Routh had met with mental health experts at least twice, who all rated him "delusional". Prosecutors confirmed that Routh had sent up to 40 letters to national news outlets to try to convince them he was innocent. The letters were intercepted before they were received. Routh's attorneys requested a trial delay until December 2025. Cannon granted the request in part, setting a trial date of September 8, 2025.

On December 13, 2024, Routh wrote a two-page letter offering to become a hostage in the Gaza war, stating that he was "willing to surrender in Gaza to restart the peace conversation". Routh compared himself to the character George Bailey from It's a Wonderful Life. Routh expressed positive feelings toward pro-Palestinian university students. He criticized Trump for a lack of morality. Routh's daughter, Sara, signed the letter.

On February 20, 2025, Routh's defense team inspected the Trump golf course. After this visit, they inspected the evidence. Following a court filing on March 3, defense attorney Militello requested for the rifle to be tested. Under questioning by Cannon, Militello responded, "The rifle is old, and we want our expert to determine if it's operable, if it's accurate, and what kind of distance it can reach." Investigators did not test the rifle the day of the arrest because no shots were fired at the scene. Judge Cannon then promised a ruling on testing the weapon.

On April 7, Routh filed an amended motion to dismiss two of the charges against him, which was "possession of a firearm by a felon" and "possession of a firearm with an obliterated serial number". In the filing, Routh argued that the gun violations were unconstitutional and a violation of the Second Amendment because the amendment does not regulate the ownership of guns by felons or serial numbers. The motion was rejected. Routh's defense claimed Tommy McGee was pressured by law enforcement agencies to identify Routh.

On July 24, Routh filed a motion to fire his public defenders and represent himself at trial. Cannon granted the motion, stating that while it was unwise, it was his constitutional right. Cannon denied his public defender's motion to withdraw, ordering them to serve as standby counsel. The decision followed repeated breakdowns in communication between Routh and his public defenders, who claimed their relationship had become "irreconcilably broken". When asked if he understood federal criminal court procedure, Routh said; "I have a book."

The final pre-trial hearing was held on September 2. Routh clashed with the prosecution over his trial attire, which included shirts with banned slogans. Judge Cannon specifically instructed Routh to dress appropriately. Routh filed a motion to add ten witnesses, including academics and a former girlfriend. Judge Cannon denied the motion, calling it "absurd." Routh's attempts to introduce personal letters as evidence were also dismissed.

== Trial ==
Routh's trial began on September 8, 2025. His jury was selected the following day. During jury selection, Judge Cannon spent several minutes related to a question submitted by Routh, which he did not use. The approximated question was; "If you were driving down the street and saw a turtle trying to cross the road, would you stop to help it or continue driving?" Routh explained that he placed an "X" next to the question when he submitted it, because he "did not think it was very good." Approximately 50 witnesses were listed.

On September 11, Routh delivered his opening statement, full of tangential historical references, including Adolf Hitler, Vladimir Putin, and the "birth of humanity". Routh got emotional. After five minutes Judge Cannon stopped him and ordered the jury out of the room. She told Routh that opening statements are allowed to talk only about valid evidence in an objective and non-argumentative way. When the jury returned, Routh began by insulting them, claiming that the case meant "absolutely nothing". Judge Cannon immediately dismissed the jury again and explained that Routh had again violated the rules and ended opening statements.

On September 12, FBI agent Aaron Casey presented a 3D reconstruction of the assassination attempt. On September 15, the FBI confirmed that Routh's DNA matched DNA on the rifle that he left at the scene. Photos of the inside of Routh's vehicle, as well as gas station surveillance footage and receipts, were shown to the court that day, showing that Routh spent the month prior to the incident living in a parking lot of a local truck stop area while surveilling the area. During this time, Routh adopted the alias "Brian Wilson" and gave that name to truck stop employees and wrote it on a tag he kept on his vehicle and on a piece of paper found at his arrest.

On September 20, Routh filed a motion to drop the charges, claiming that since the gun was never fired, prosecutors had "yet to prove" an assassination attempt on Trump took place. He argued that the area outside Trump's golf course was a public right of way, giving anyone the right to be there with a weapon. On September 22, Routh called three witnesses and rested his case. He had told Judge Cannon that he would not take the stand. At that point, 38 of the 50 witnesses had testified, including Robert Fercano, Tommy McGee and the Plata brothers. Routh's statements and arguments totaled about 42 minutes.

=== Verdict ===
The full jury verdict

On September 23, Routh was found guilty on all counts. The jury deliberated for some two and a half hours. While the verdict was read, Routh grabbed a black pen and repeatedly attempted to stab himself in the neck. Marshals tackled him and dragged him away. Routh's daughter Sara begged her father to not hurt himself and began swearing at the jury before storming out. Routh returned to the courtroom in handcuffs, with no blood visible on his shirt and appearing to have failed to harm himself. The pen Routh used was a flexible model intended to prevent it from use as a weapon.

Following the trial's conclusion, Sara first spoke to the media. She denied that her father was responsible, claiming the media was "spreading lies" about him. Sara called her father her "best friend" and that it "wasn't in her father's nature" to commit such a crime. Sara brought up Routh's stabbing attempt, saying, "Our democracy is crumbling right in front of our eyes, and no one's doing anything about it. And my dad tried to bring awareness to that."

=== Sentence ===
Routh was moved to the medical dorm of the St. Lucie County jail under suicide observation. On October 22, the Federal Public Defender's Office requested the court to appoint an attorney to represent Routh during sentencing. They cited that Routh regretted representing himself, and that he wanted an attorney to represent him during sentencing. On October 29, Routh filed a motion asking a federal judge to recommend he be imprisoned either in a state that authorized assisted suicide, or to be traded as a prisoner to Iran or China.

On November 10, Routh’s motion for an attorney was granted, and the sentencing hearing was delayed to February 4, 2026. Routh was eventually sentenced to life in prison without parole, plus a mandatory additional seven years for a firearm offense. Routh's defense had sought a sentence of 27 years, citing his age and other factors. On March 20, Routh was transferred to United States Penitentiary, Victorville, in Victorville, California. He was reportedly being kept in solitary confinement with no television, no computer access and limited human contact. On September 27 2026, Routh was transferred to ADX Florence, in Florence, Colorado.

=== Appeal ===
On February 16, 2026, Routh's attorney filed a notice of appeal with the United States Court of Appeals for the Eleventh Circuit.

== Conspirators ==
=== Tina Cooper and Ronnie Oxendine ===
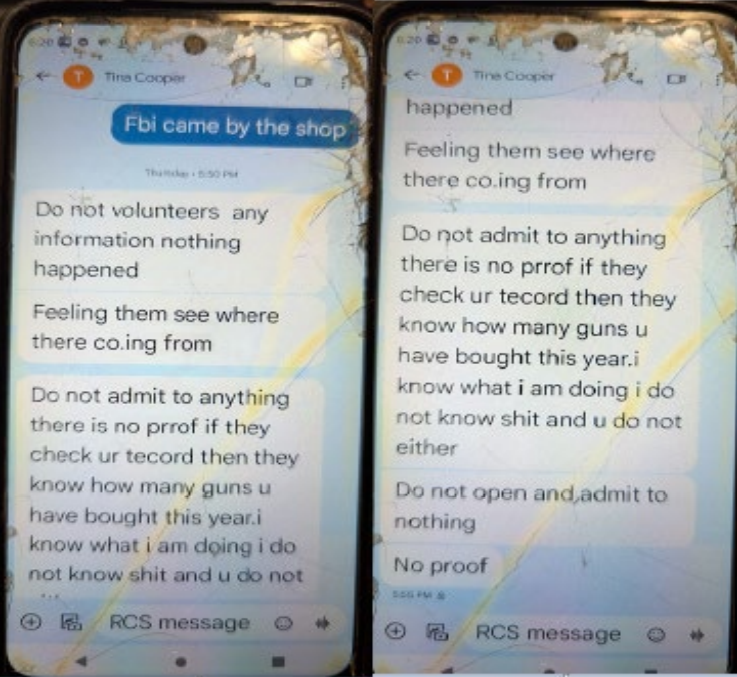
The message thread between Cooper and Oxendine about obstructing the FBI investigation; September 19, 2024.

From July to August 2024, Routh conspired with his former employees Tina Brown Cooper, and Ronnie Jay Oxendine to obtain a rifle.

In July 2024, Routh called Cooper saying he would soon visit Greensboro and that he needed help buying a rifle. Cooper agreed to assist him and reached out to Oxendine asking if he was willing to sell her a gun, as she initially did not want Oxendine knowing it was for Routh. Oxendine agreed to sell an SKS rile, and planned to meet at Oxendine and Son Roofing Company.

On August 2, Oxendine met Cooper along with her daughter and Routh. He was surprised to see Routh arrive, as they were both owners of local roofing companies, however they had not spoken in almost ten years. Cooper told Oxendine that the rifle was actually for Routh, but she had not told him because she worried about selling Routh a weapon. Routh paid Oxendine $350 for the rifle and paid Cooper $100 for arranging the sale. Routh then removed the rifle's serial number.

Following the assassination attempt, Cooper deleted all traces of Routh from her phone including call logs and text messages, and instructed Oxendine to refuse to cooperate with the FBI. She told the media that she had not spoken to Routh since 2004, when she claimed he fired her after a falling out.

On September 22, FBI agents interviewed Oxendine who said he met Routh approximately 30 years earlier, although they were not friends. He then falsely told the agents that Routh had pawned an SKS rifle to him for around $300. Oxendine later admitted that he lied in order to minimize his role in the incident. He admitted his role in the sale of the rifle to Routh.

Agents interviewed Cooper who told them that she met Routh in 1999 as an employee of his roofing business. She said she became aware of Routh's criminal record in 2002, after his weapons conviction. Through Facebook, Cooper had several conversations with Routh between 2014 and 2022. Additionally, Cooper told the agents that she was "guilty" of assisting Routh, whom she knew was a convicted felon, in acquiring a firearm. She also confessed to instructing Oxendine to refuse to cooperate with the FBI. The agents asked Cooper if she had instructed any other person to lie to the FBI or mislead their investigation, which she denied on multiple occasions. Both Oxendine and Cooper told the agents that they had no prior knowledge of Routh’s intentions.

Cooper and Oxendine were indicted in March 2025, and were arrested in June. Cooper pled guilty to firearm trafficking, while Oxendine pled guilty to possessing an unregistered firearm after police found an unregistered short-barreled shotgun in his storage unit.

On September 17, 2025, Oxendine was a witness at Routh's trial. He detailed how he and Cooper arranged the sale of the rifle to Routh. Routh apologized to Oxendine and offered to serve part of his sentence, saying; "I know you're extremely mad at me." This prompted Judge Cannon to warn Routh about violating his time on the lectern. Cooper refused to testify at the trial.

=== Alleged conspirators ===
On April 7, 2025, federal prosecutors alleged that Routh had saved a conversation with a Mexican named "Ramiro" on February 29, 2024 about potentially smuggling an Afghanistani migrant family into the United States. The indictment claimed that the man spoke mostly Spanish, and that Routh occasionally used Google Translate to communicate with him. An alleged conversation occurred on September 12, where Routh allegedly sent a message stating that he planned on fleeing to Mexico City following the assassination attempt, while "Ramiro" allegedly responded that he would see Routh then and that he was located four hours outside of Mexico City. Routh allegedly replied that he would call "Ramiro" once he knew for sure whether or not he’d meet him.

Routh allegedly sought to obtain military weapons in August 2024 from someone he believed to be a Ukrainian. Routh allegedly told this associate to send him a rocket-propelled grenade or a Stinger missile, stating that he "needed equipment so that Trump couldn't get elected". Routh allegedly discussed the idea of using a rocket launcher to shoot down Trump's plane.

== Political views ==
Based on his social media posts, Routh's political views have evolved. Supporting Trump in 2016, but in 2020, he stated about Trump, "I will be glad when you are gone." Voting records showed that Routh requested an absentee ballot in 2016, but did not vote. In a self-published e-book (Ukraine's Unwinnable War: The Fatal Flaw of Democracy, World Abandonment and the Global Citizen-Taiwan, Afghanistan, North Korea and the end [sic] of Humanity) in 2023, he wrote about his support for Trump stating, "I am man enough to say that I misjudged and made a terrible mistake." He stated, "you are free to assassinate Trump as well as me for that error in judgement". The passage was addressed to the Iranian government. His son Oran stated that Routh hated Trump like "every reasonable person".

Routh supported Bernie Sanders in 2020, criticizing Joe Biden as "Sleepy Joe". In 2024, he expressed concern over democracy in a post tagging Biden, and telling him his campaign slogan should be "Keep America Democratic and Free". In 2020, he supported Tulsi Gabbard, calling for an executive order on police misconduct, and he made small donations to Democratic fundraising platform ActBlue, contributing 19 times in 2019 and 2020 with amounts ranging from $1 to $25. By early 2024, he suggested a Nikki Haley and Vivek Ramaswamy ticket for the Republican primary. In 2024, he voted in the Democratic primary. Routh donated $140 to Democratic causes after 2019. He registered in North Carolina as an independent voter in 2012.

Routh stated his support for Taiwan, discussed its political status, and called for international intervention to protect the island from China. In posts on his Twitter (now X) account in 2023, Routh tagged the Haitian National Police and asserted that he had thousands of NATO-trained Afghan soldiers who "wish to serve for the Haiti national police at cheap wages". Routh donated through ActBlue 20 times. He donated $140 exclusively to Democrats and to Gabbard (then a Democrat).

== See also ==
- Thomas Crooks, who attempted to assassinate Donald Trump in Pennsylvania in 2024
- List of United States presidential assassination attempts and plots
