= United States Penitentiary, Victorville =

High-security prison in California, US

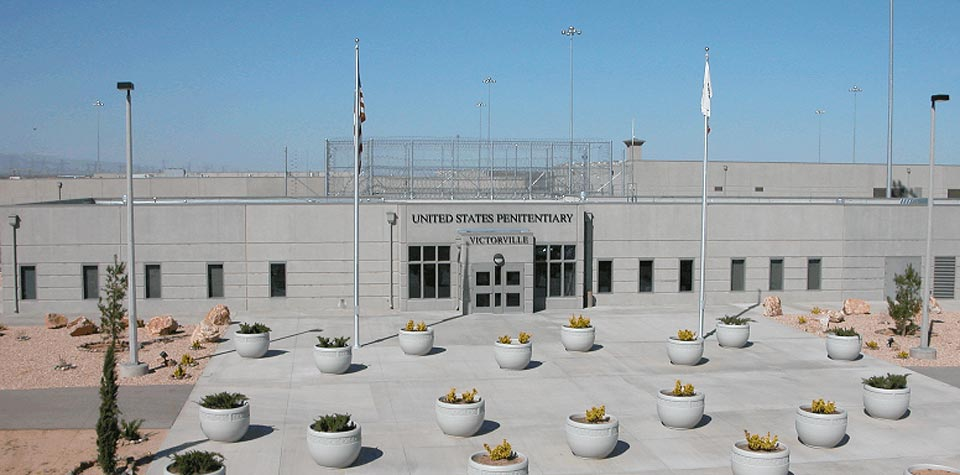
- Interactive map of United States Penitentiary, Victorville
- Location: Victorville, California; 34°34′10.2″N 117°21′45.0″W
- Status: Operational
- Security class: High-security
- Population: 1,126 (September 2023)
- Opened: 2004
- Warden: C. Lepe

The United States Penitentiary, Victorville (USP Victorville) is a high-security United States federal prison for male inmates in California. It is part of the Federal Correctional Complex, Victorville (FCC Victorville) and is operated by the Federal Bureau of Prisons, a division of the United States Department of Justice.

FCC Victorville is located on land that was formerly part of George Air Force Base, located within the city limits, 8 miles (13 km) northwest of central Victorville, California, and is approximately 85 miles (137 km) northeast of Los Angeles.

== History ==
USP Victorville opened on October 21, 2004 as a high-security prison which cost $101.4 million. It was constructed by Hensel Phelps Construction Company of Irvine, California and the Crosby Group Design Firm of Redwood City, California. The security systems were designed by Buford Goff and Associates of Columbia, South Carolina.

== Facility ==
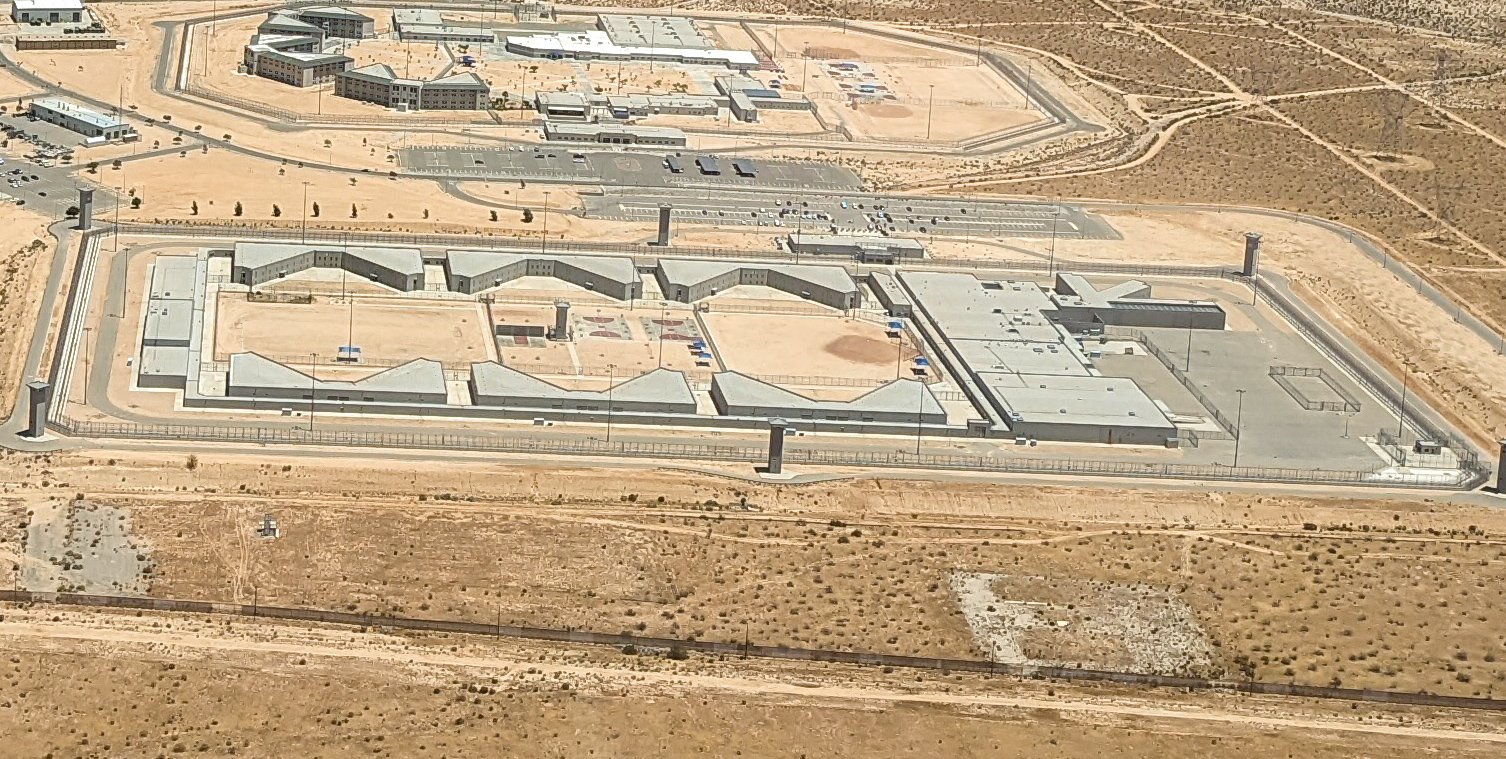
Aerial view of United States Penitentiary Victorville

USP Victorville is 630,000 square feet (59,000 m^{2}) and is designed to house 960 male inmates in six housing units. Six V-shaped buildings (units 1–3 on east side, units 4–6 on west side) facing each other and a larger maintenance building surround a central yard with a tower in the middle. Six additional towers are lined along the rectangular-shaped facility. The facility is surrounded by a lethal electrical double fence, a 2 m (6.6 ft) brickstone wall on its northern side and a view protection fence on its western side. Cells are approximately 4 m × 2 m (13.1 ft × 6.6 ft) in size equipped with a bunkbed, a stainless steel sink-toilet combination and a small table with a non-removable stool. Cells are usually occupied by two inmates and are air-conditioned. The administrative and disciplinary unit (SHU) can hold 238 inmates. Cells in the disciplinary unit have showers and are occupied by three inmates when overcrowding occurs (one inmate is forced to sleep on the floor in such cases).

== Inmate life ==
Prisoners have access to the text-based e-mail program known as TRULINCS (Trust Fund Limited Inmate Communication System). Prisoners are allowed only 13,000 characters per e-mail, and attachments cannot be sent, received, or viewed. Inmates are not allowed to retain more than two newspapers, 10 magazines and 25 letters in their cells. They are allowed to place phone calls to up to 30 approved numbers. Phone calls are restricted to 15 minutes per call and five hours per month. Inmates pay for their phone calls through their trust accounts. Inmates can buy additional food, hygiene articles and clothes from commissary for a maximum of $290 a month.

Inmates are counted 5 to 6 times a day at 12:01 a.m., 3:00 a.m., 5:00 a.m., 4:00 p.m. (stand-up count), 10:00 p.m. and 10:00 a.m. (on weekends and holidays). Initial work movements start at 4:30 a.m. and inmates must be up at 7:30 a.m. All inmates must be back to their cells at 10:00 p.m.

== Notable incidents ==
On March 3, 2003, USP Victorville inmate Richard Dale Morrison assaulted fellow inmate John Walker Lindh, who was serving time for joining the Taliban. Morrison was charged with misdemeanor assault.

On April 11, 2005, USP Victorville inmate Scott Fischer (who used several aliases including Peter Steven Scopazzi, the name on his prison death certificate) was fatally slashed by another inmate, reportedly over a dispute regarding less than $10.00 worth of tobacco.

USP Victorville inmate Tony Richard Padilla died at Arrowhead Regional Medical Center on August 12, 2006, from injuries sustained during a fight with another inmate.

On the afternoon of May 13, 2009, several inmates at USP Victorville attacked inmate Gregory Francis Ritter of Waikiki, Hawaii, who was serving a 33-month sentence for drug and weapons possession, according to the San Bernardino County Sheriff's Department. Ritter was transported to a local hospital by ambulance and later flown to Arrowhead Regional Medical Center in critical condition. Ritter died of his injuries at 7:13 p.m.

On October 1, 2013, inmate Javier Sanders was found beaten to death in his cell. Sanders was serving a 10-year sentence for federal drug crimes. Fifty-three-year-old David Snow, the former president of the Aryan Brotherhood of Ohio, was found beaten to death on November 13, 2013 (Snow had been convicted in 2005 of possession of a firearm and 50 tablets of oxycodone and had been sentenced to 180 months' confinement.). The next day, 40-year-old David Serra was found dead in what was determined to be a suicide. Serra had been at the prison for only five months, and was serving a 30-year sentence for second-degree murder and deadly use of a firearm.

On June 21, 2014, two inmates were found dead in the prison. The deaths were quickly ruled homicides, and the victims were later identified as 24-year-old Brian Kountz and 49-year-old Robert Howard Ferguson. In 2013, Kountz had been sentenced in Wyoming to 80 months in prison for an armed robbery. Ferguson had been sentenced the same year in Las Vegas, Nevada, to 80 months in prison for being a felon in possession of a firearm. Three days later, news outlets reported that 48-year-old Daniel Casto (60992-065) of Sweet Home, Oregon, had been identified as a suspect and placed in a restricted housing unit within USP Victorville. Casto is currently being held at the United States Penitentiary, Florence ADX, a high-security federal prison in Colorado, with a release date in 2031.

Serious incidents of violence at federal prisons are investigated by the FBI.

== Notable inmates (current and former) ==
†The Sentencing Reform Act of 1984 eliminated parole for federal inmates. However, inmates sentenced for offenses committed prior to 1987 are eligible for parole consideration.

=== High-profile inmates ===
Inmate Name	Register Number	Status	Details
Mutulu Shakur	83205-012	Transferred to FMC Lexington	Shakur was one of six Black Liberation Army members to carry out the Brink's robbery of 1981.
Gerardo Hernandez	58739-004	Sentenced to life in 2001; sentence commuted by President Barack Obama in 2014.	Leader of the Cuban Five spy network; convicted in 2001 of conspiracy to commit murder and espionage for sending classified information to Cuban intelligence officials, who used it to shoot down a plane flown by four members of the anti-Castro group Brothers to the Rescue.
Lontrell Williams, Jr	52490-509	Sentenced to 5 years, 3 months in April 2022; released October 2025 after serving only three years.	Williams is better known as Memphis rapper/gang leader Pooh Shiesty. Williams pled guilty in January 2022 to federal charges relating to an October 2020 robbery/shooting in the Miami, FL area.

=== Organized Crime ===
Inmate Name	Register Number	Status	Details
Javier Vasquez-Velasco	91039-012	Serving a life sentence; eligible for parole in 2049.†	Former bodyguard for Hondureño drug lord Juan Matta-Ballesteros; convicted in 1990 of murder in aid of racketeering for killing two tourists he mistook for DEA agents; suspected of involvement in the 1985 kidnapping and murder of DEA agent Enrique Camarena.
James Sweeney	58827=066	Serving a life sentence.	Leader of Maryland prison gang Dead Man Incorporated, convicted of conspiracy to participate in a violent racketeering enterprise and conspiracy to distribute drugs and sentenced to life imprisonment.
Christopher Londonio	72210-054	Serving a life sentence.	Lucchese crime family soldier, convicted of the murder of East Harlem Purple Gang leader Michael Meldish in 2013. In October 2019, it was reported that Londonio planned to escape the Metropolitan Detention Center in Brooklyn in 2017 by breaking through a window using dental floss and then using bed sheets to climb down to the street.
Tony Hernández	17838-104	Serving a life sentence.	Honduran drug trafficker, former congressman, and brother of former President Juan Orlando Hernández. Serving a life sentence for distribution of cocaine, firearms, and false testimony offenses .

=== Terrorists ===
Inmate Name	Register Number	Status	Details
Ahmed Ajaj	40637-053	Serving 84 years. Scheduled for release in 2091.	Convicted for his role in the 1993 World Trade Center bombing.
Khalid al-Fawwaz	67497-054	Serving a life sentence.	Convicted for his involvement in the 1998 United States embassy bombings.
Abdul Murad	37437-054	Serving a life sentence.	Al-Qaeda operative; convicted in 1996 of terrorism conspiracy in connection with planning Project Bojinka, a foiled plot conceived by senior Al-Qaeda member Khalid Sheikh Mohammed to bomb twelve planes over the Pacific Ocean in a 48-hour period.
John Walker Lindh	45426-083	Released on May 23, 2019.	Taliban operative who was convicted in 2002 of conspiracy to murder U.S. citizens or nationals and providing support to the Taliban and Al-Qaeda and sentenced to 20 years.

=== Others ===
Inmate Name	Register Number	Status	Details
Edgar Steele	14226-023	Died in custody in 2014 while serving a 50-year sentence.	Idaho attorney who defended the Aryan Nations in a 2000 lawsuit filed by two hate crime victims; convicted of attempted murder for hire in 2011 for paying an individual $10,000 to kill his wife and mother-in-law with a pipe bomb.
Lenny Dykstra	57780-112	Sentenced to three years in prison. Released after six-and-a-half months in July 2013.	Former Major League Baseball player for the New York Mets and Philadelphia Phillies. Charged with 25 misdemeanor and felony counts of grand theft auto, identity theft, filing false financial statements and possession of cocaine, ecstasy and the human growth hormone (HGH) known as Somatropin. Pleaded no contest to grand theft auto and providing false financial statements in exchange for dropping the drug charges.
Johnny Orsinger	48683-008	Serving a life sentence.	Participated in the carjacking and double murder of a woman and her granddaughter in Arizona; his accomplice, Lezmond Mitchell, was executed at USP Terre Haute in 2020.
Ryan Wesley Routh	35967-511	Serving a life sentence.	Former North Carolina resident convicted on attempting to assassinate Donald Trump in Florida.

== See also ==
- List of United States federal prisons
- Federal Bureau of Prisons
- Incarceration in the United States
