= Federal Correctional Complex, Victorville =

Federal prison complex in California, US

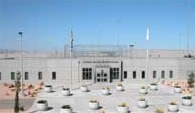
- Interactive map of Federal Correctional Complex, Victorville
- Location: Victorville, Victor Valley, San Bernardino County, California; 34°34′00″N 117°21′50″W
- Status: Operational
- Security class: High, medium and minimum-security
- Warden: C. Lepe

The Federal Correctional Complex, Victorville (FCC Victorville) is a United States federal prison complex located in the Victor Valley of the Mojave Desert, in San Bernardino County, southern California. It is on part of the former George Air Force Base (1941−1992) near Victorville, approximately 85 miles (137 km) northeast of Downtown Los Angeles.

The complex is built upon a designated Superfund site. 33 toxic chemicals are known to be present in the facility water supply and have caused illness among several inmates.

The prison complex is operated by the Federal Bureau of Prisons, a division of the United States Department of Justice.

== Facilities ==
The FCC Victorville complex consists of three facilities:

- Federal Correctional Institution, Victorville (FCI I Victorville): a medium-security facility for male inmates
- Federal Correctional Institution, Victorville (FCI II Victorville): a medium-security facility for male inmates with a satellite prison camp that houses minimum-security female offenders.
- United States Penitentiary, Victorville (USP Victorville): a high-security facility for male inmates.

== See also ==
- Federal Bureau of Prisons
- Incarceration in the United States
- List of U.S. federal prisons
- Prisons in California
