= Thomas Crooks =

Attempted assassin of Donald Trump (2003–2024)

- Undated driver's license photo of Crooks
- Born: Thomas Matthew Crooks; September 20, 2003
- Died: July 13, 2024 (aged 20); Meridian, Pennsylvania, U.S. 40.857028°N 79.971°W
- Cause of death: Gunshot wound
- Education: Community College of Allegheny County (AS)
- Known for: Attempted assassination of Donald Trump in Pennsylvania
- Motive: Unknown

Details
- Date: July 13, 2024
- Location: Meridian, Pennsylvania
- Killed: 2
- Injured: 6 (2 from gunfire including Donald Trump, four officers injured by flying debris) (Note: A claimed third injury from gunfire—U.S. representative Ronny Jackson's nephew—has not been confirmed by independent sources; the sole source is Jackson himself.)
- Weapon: DPMS Panther Arms DR-15 16" M4 5.56x45mm/.223

Thomas Matthew Crooks (September 20, 2003 – July 13, 2024) was an American man who attempted to assassinate then-former U.S. president Donald Trump, who at the time was the presumptive Republican Party nominee for the 2024 presidential election.

On July 13, 2024, at a rally near Butler, Pennsylvania, Crooks shot at Trump with an AR-15–style rifle from a nearby rooftop while Trump was giving a speech. Crooks wounded Trump's ear and shot three attendees, killing two of them, (Note: One attendee died at the scene, while the other died two years later in 2026 from complications directly tied to his injuries.) before being killed by a Secret Service counter sniper team. His motive remained unknown after the Federal Bureau of Investigation (FBI) concluded its investigation in November 2025.

Very little information about Crooks was released to the public by the FBI. Public opinion polls from a month after the attempt showed that over half of Americans believed that Crooks did not act alone. The assassination attempt has resulted in conspiracy theories.

== Early life and education ==
Thomas Matthew Crooks was born on September 20, 2003, and he grew up in Bethel Park, Pennsylvania, south of Pittsburgh. Both of Crooks's parents worked as licensed professional counselors, but appear to have left the profession in 2024. Recollections about him, including information about his life and personality, vary considerably.

Crooks attended Abraham Lincoln Elementary School from 2009 to 2014. One of Crooks's friends who attended this school with him, said he was a "nice boy" who "kept to himself." Crooks began attending Neil Armstrong Middle School in 2015, but he transferred to Independence Middle School in 2016 where he remained until he entered high school in 2018. One investigation only found a "lunch detention in middle school for chewing gum" as bad behavior growing up. He joined the National Technical Honor Society in 2021 while a junior in high school. In 2022, he graduated Bethel Park High School with high honors and won a $500 "star award" from the National Math and Science Initiative. Crooks earned a score of 1530 out of 1600 on the SAT, as well as perfect grades on three Advanced Placement exams. Classmates and school officials characterized him as being quiet; classmates said that he was often bullied for various reasons, including his quiet demeanor and body odor, as well as for wearing camouflage hunting outfits to school. Criminologists have suggested that the bullying and isolation may have contributed to Crooks's decision to try to assassinate Trump.

During his freshman year of high school, Crooks anonymously posted threats online, warning students at Bethel Park High School to not come to school the next day. Here, Crooks had claimed to have placed bombs inside the bathrooms in the school's cafeteria. Many students stayed home the following day. The threats were dismissed by the school's administration, and no legal actions were taken.

Crooks earned an associate degree in engineering science from the Community College of Allegheny County in Pittsburgh, graduating two months before the shooting. He was employed as a dietary aide in a nursing home at the time of the shooting. According to the nursing home, which is less than a mile away from where he lived, he had passed a background check and "performed his job without concern". He had been accepted into both the University of Pittsburgh and Robert Morris University in Moon Township, Pennsylvania, northwest of Pittsburgh, and planned to attend the latter. He had been a member of a local shooting club for at least a year.

Crooks's father noticed his mental health declining in the year before the shooting, and particularly in the months after graduation. He later told investigators that he had seen his son talking to himself and dancing around his bedroom late at night, and that his family had a history of mental health and addiction issues. Crooks was also making depression-related queries online, investigators found. Interviews with his teachers, friends, and co-workers suggest that many people who interacted with him regularly did not know he was troubled.

== Donald Trump assassination attempt ==
Photograph of Crooks taken by local law enforcement snipers an hour prior to the assassination attempt

Prior to the shooting, Crooks searched for images and public appearances of Trump, President Joe Biden, Attorney General Merrick Garland, FBI director Christopher A. Wray, and Catherine, Princess of Wales, as well as for information regarding the Republican National Convention and the Democratic National Convention. He also searched the Internet for information on major depressive disorder and the 2021 Oxford High School shooting, with authorities finding an arrest photograph of Oxford shooter Ethan Crumbley on his phone.

On December 6, 2023, almost seven months before the shooting, Crooks rapidly cycled through several news websites, including CNN, The New York Times, and Fox News, before visiting the Trump administration’s archives. Then, he visited seven gun websites, including one focused on the AR-15, similar to the rifle he would use in the attack. Later that day, he paid a visit to his local shooting range. Much of his online activity in the months before the shooting is not known, because he frequently used a virtual private network.

In January 2024, Crooks placed a $101.91 order online for more than two gallons of nitromethane, a fuel additive that can be used in explosives, giving his home address for delivery. The package did not arrive promptly. On January 31 at 7:44 a.m. EST, Crooks sent an email to the company asking what happened to the package.

On July 6, 2024, the same day he registered for the rally, Crooks searched "how far was Oswald from Kennedy", in reference to former president John F. Kennedy and the gunman who assassinated him. Crooks also searched for information on power plants and the attempted assassination of Slovak prime minister Robert Fico. He used a number of aliases and encrypted communication accounts to buy firearm supplies and bomb-making material. On July 12, 2024, Crooks went to a shooting range where he was a member to practice firing.

Before going to the rally on July 13, Crooks purchased 50 rounds of ammunition and a ladder. He requested the day off from work because he had "something important to do", telling his co-workers that he would return the next day. Hours before the shooting, Crooks's parents had called the police to report him as missing and expressed concern about his wellbeing. On July 13, Crooks went to the Trump rally. He climbed onto a building that was being used by police as a staging area. Text messages from a police sniper indicate that the police were already aware of his presence 90 minutes before he opened fire. He was armed with an AR-15–style rifle, which his father had bought legally in 2013 and was then legally transferred to him in 2023. Crooks fired a total of eight shots; one bullet grazed Trump's upper right ear, but he was otherwise unharmed. Three adult male audience members were also hit; one of them, 50-year-old Corey Comperatore, suffered a fatal wound. Crooks was subsequently killed by a member of the Secret Service Counter Sniper Team, who shot him in the head. Bomb-making materials were found inside his vehicle and at his home, and a remote detonator was found on his body. The FBI identified him as the shooter on July 14. An investigation by the FBI was reported to be underway in July 2024, which concluded in November 2025. Crooks's motives remain unknown.

FBI evidence from the assassination attempt
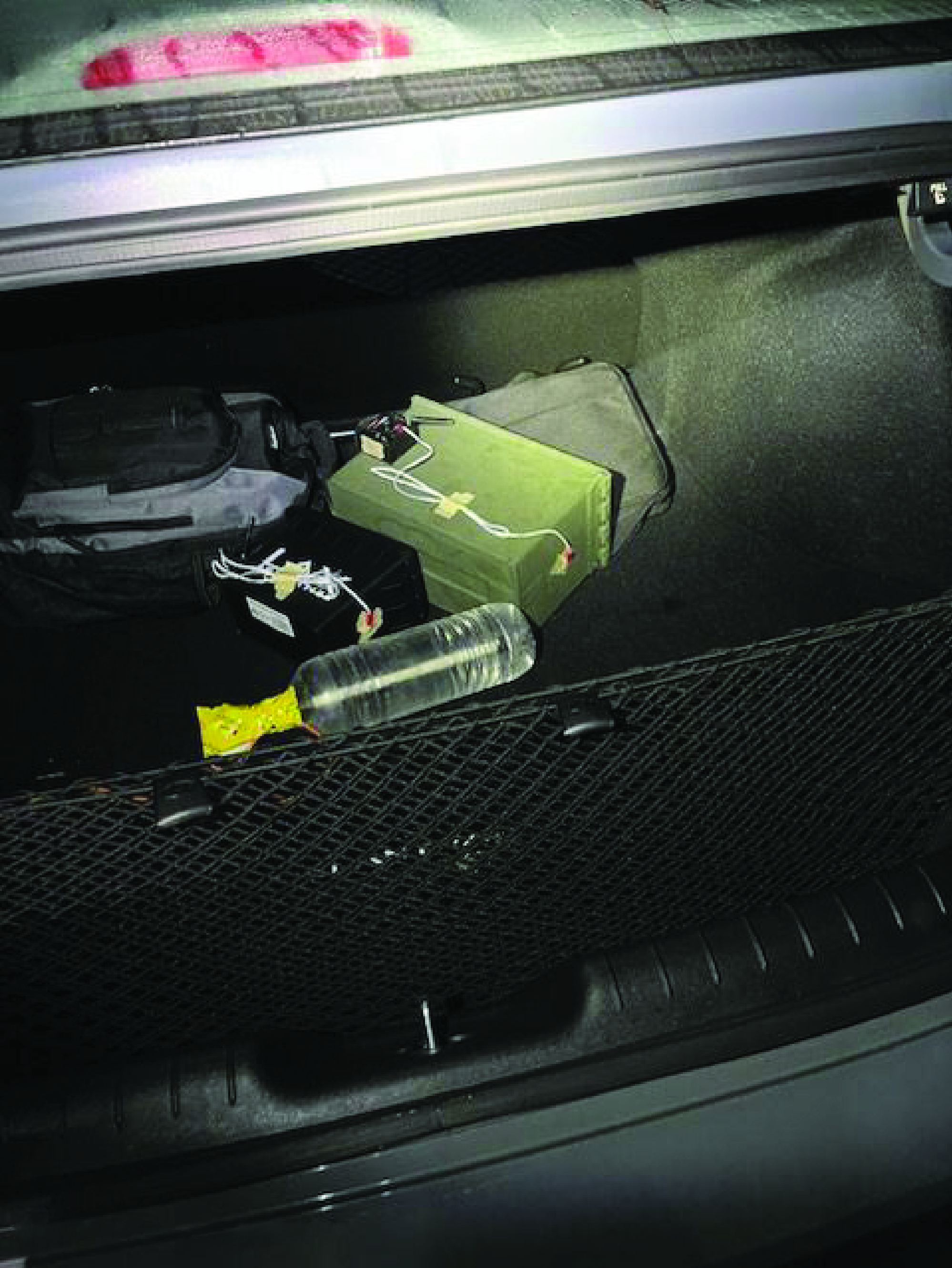
Improvised explosive devices in the car trunk of Crooks found by the FBI

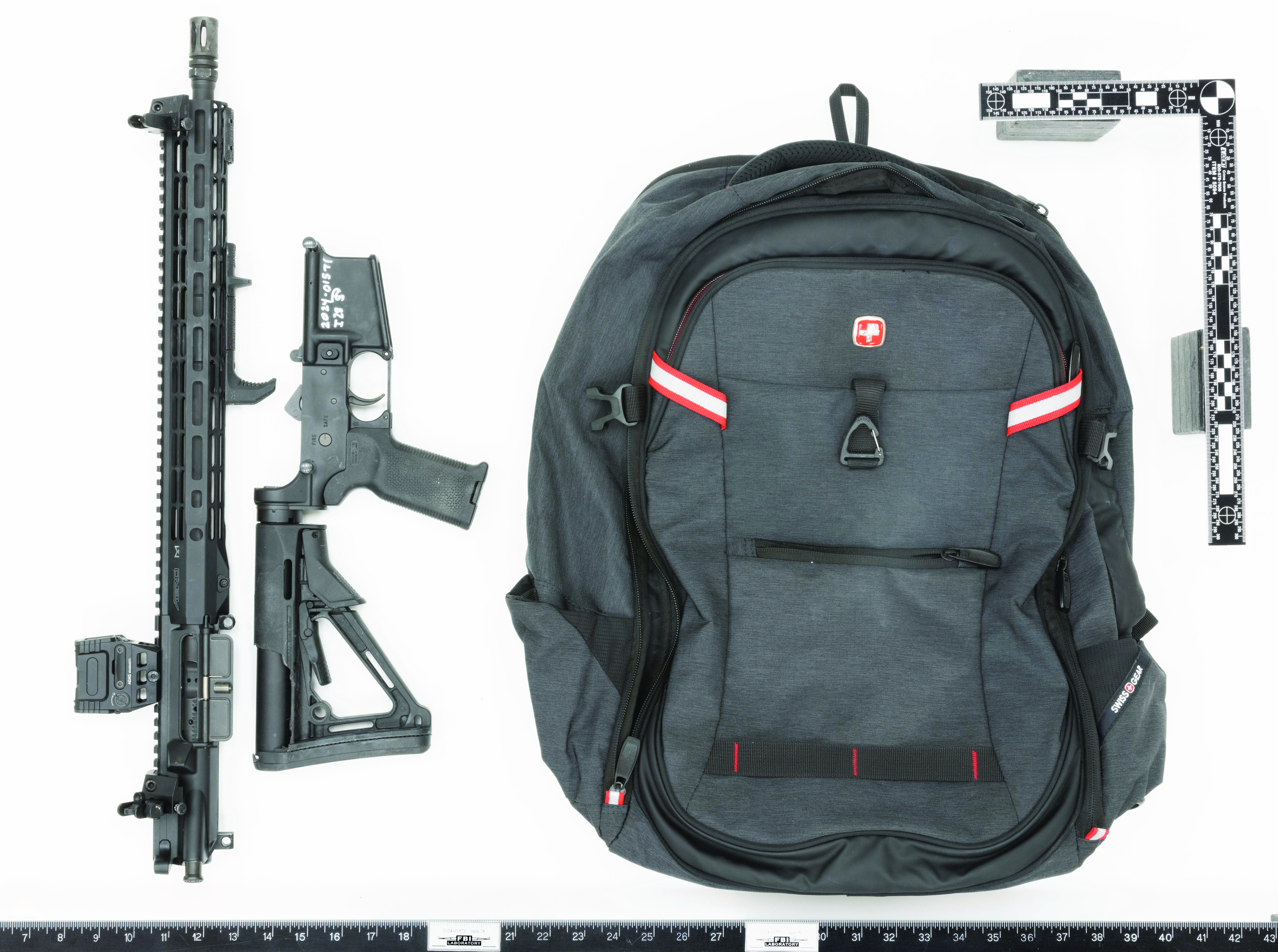
The rifle and backpack used by Crooks at the assassination attempt

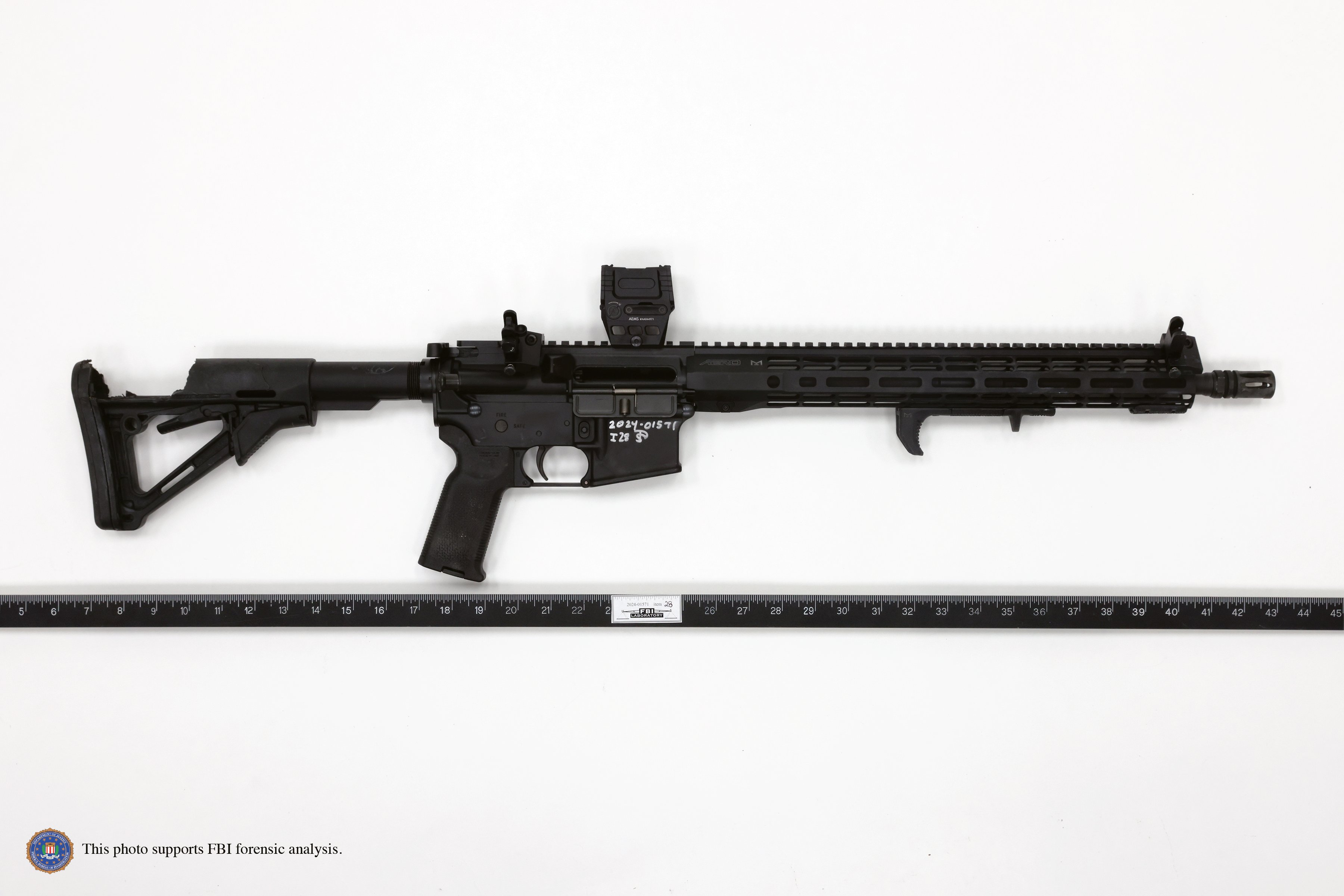
The rifle used by Crooks during the assassination attempt, with visible damage to the stock of the firearm after being struck by police gunfire at Crooks

== Political activities ==
Authorities have said that Crooks's political views are unknown, and they have not determined whether his assassination attempt was politically motivated. Public records do not indicate his views.

On January 20, 2021, when Crooks was 17, he donated $15 to the Progressive Turnout Project, a liberal voter turnout group, through the Democratic Party donation platform ActBlue. His donation was made on the same day that President Biden was sworn into office. According to the Progressive Turnout Project, he made the donation in response to an email about "tuning into" the inauguration. He unsubscribed from the group's mailing list in 2022.

Crooks had been registered to vote since September 2021, when he turned 18. He registered as a Republican, and he voted only once (in the 2022 midterm elections). In 2022, Crooks wrote about George Orwell's essay "Shooting an Elephant", calling it "a powerful allegory warning against adopting imperialistic policies".

In April 2023, Crooks showed his frustration with American politics in a school essay about ranked-choice voting, where he claimed "divisive and incendiary campaigns are pulling the country apart". In another essay, Crooks criticized how NASA handled the 1986 Challenger disaster. He blamed NASA's administrators for the incident, claiming they were "trying to live up to the lofty promises they made to Congress which they were never going to be able to fulfill".

After the shooting, the FBI uncovered a social media account "believed to be associated with the shooter" with about 700 comments from 2019 to 2020. A public statement from FBI deputy director Paul Abbate described Crooks's activity on social networking services as including comments that "appear to reflect antisemitic and anti-immigration themes" and "espouse political violence". Abbate noted that the findings were preliminary and that the comments were still in the process of being authenticated. Some of these alleged comments indicated that Crooks may have been fascinated with the idea of assassinating political opponents, while frequently quoting former Chinese leader Mao Zedong such as; "The only true political power comes from the barrel of a gun." [sic]

== See also ==
- Ryan Routh, who attempted to assassinate Donald Trump in Florida in September 2024
- List of United States presidential assassination attempts and plots
