= Zeto =

Zeto may refer to:

- Zeto (Greek), a Greek interjection
- A trade name for the drug Azithromycin
- ZETO, a 1960s Polish computer company; see Andrew Targowski § Work in Poland
- ZETO building; see Halina Skibniewska

== See also ==
- N'Zeto, a town located in Zaire, Angola
- Zito (disambiguation)
