= Zico =

Zico may refer to:

== People named Zico ==
=== Nickname ===
- Zico (footballer) (born 1953), Brazilian footballer and coach Arthur Antunes Coimbra
- Zico (footballer, born 1954), Brazilian footballer who played as a goalkeeper
- Zico (footballer, born 1966), Brazilian footballer and coach Milton Antonio Nunes Niemet
- Zico (rapper), South Korean rapper Woo Ji-ho (born 1992)

=== Given name ===
- Zico Bailey (born 2000), American soccer player
- Zico Doe (fl. from 1990), Liberian footballer
- Zico Otieno (Zedekiah Otieno, born 1968), Kenyan footballer
- Zico Rumkabu (born 1989), Indonesian footballer
- Zico Senamuang or Kiatisuk Senamuang (born 1973), Thai footballer and coach
- Zico Waeytens (born 1991), Belgian cyclist

== Other uses ==
- Zico Football Center, a sports complex in Rio de Janeiro, Brazil
- Zico (drink), a brand of coconut water
- Zico, the ship of the 2024 Mozambique boat disaster

== See also ==
- Zico Soccer, a video game
- Zico Chain, a British rock band
- Zito (disambiguation)
- Zeiko Lewis (born 1994), Bermudian footballer
- Mostafa Ziko (born 1997), Egyptian footballer
