= Evan Vucci =

American photojournalist (born 1977)

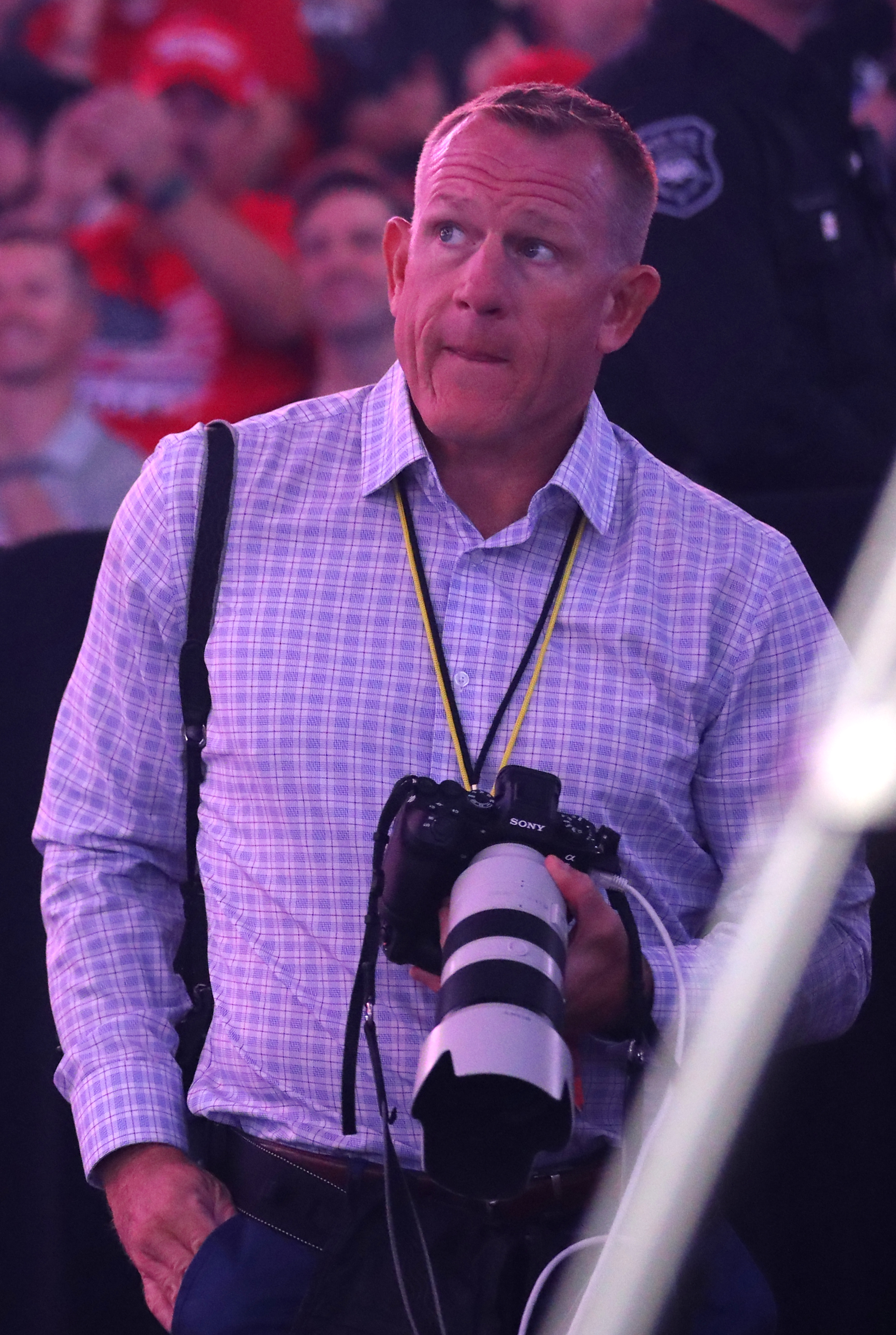
- Vucci in 2024
- Born: June 15, 1977 (age 49); Olney, Maryland, U.S.
- Education: Rochester Institute of Technology (BFA)
- Occupation: Photojournalist
- Years active: 2000–present
- Awards: Pulitzer Prize for Breaking News Photography (2021)

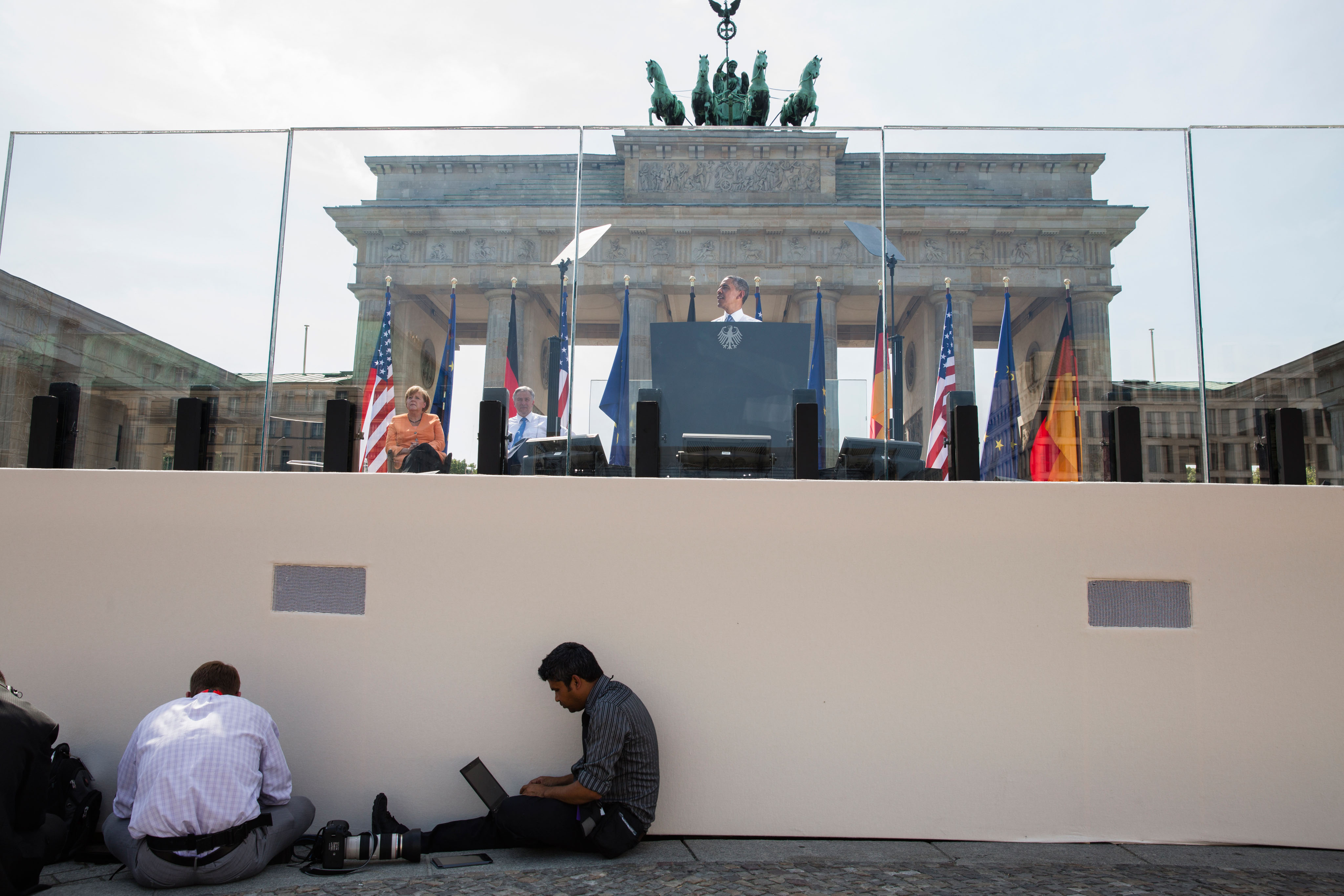
Photojournalists Evan Vucci and Jewel Samad work in the foreground as President Barack Obama delivers remarks at the Brandenburg Gate in Berlin, Germany, June 19, 2013. On stage with the President are Chancellor Angela Merkel and Berlin Mayor Klaus Wowereit. (Official White House Photo by Pete Souza)

Evan Vucci (/ˈvuːtʃi/; born June 15, 1977) is an American photojournalist, currently serving as a senior photojournalist for Reuters in Washington, D.C. Vucci has shot and produced both still photography and video projects worldwide, and has worked on various subjects including Washington, D.C.–based sports, the U.S. military, and U.S. politics.

He was part of the AP reporting team that won the 2021 Pulitzer Prize for Breaking News Photography. In July 2024, he took photographs of an injured Donald Trump with his fist raised after his attempted assassination in Pennsylvania.

== Early life and education ==
Vucci was born in Olney, Maryland, on June 15, 1977. His mother was a secretary and his father was a police officer.

Vucci enrolled at the Rochester Institute of Technology in Rochester, New York, in 1995 on a path to commercial photography. Whilst there he attended a lecture given by photojournalist Michael Williamson. In the lecture, Williamson showed his work and spoke of his travels all around the world while on staff with The Washington Post. Vucci was struck by the photographs and life Williamson had lived and changed his major to focus on photojournalism. While still enrolled at Rochester Institute of Technology, Vucci photographed sports for Reuters.

Vucci graduated from the Rochester Institute of Technology with a bachelor's degree in professional photographic illustration in 2000.

== Career ==
After graduating from college, Vucci moved to Fayetteville, North Carolina, and took a 30-hour-a-week position at The Fayetteville Observer. After about three months, Vucci realized that life at a small-town paper was not for him. Vucci took a job in Sydney, Australia, to work for the International Olympic Committee as a photo manager during the 2000 Summer Olympics. While working in Sydney, Vucci met then Associated Press photographer Doug Mills, who would help him get his foot in the door at the Associated Press as a freelance photojournalist.

In late 2003, Vucci accepted a position at the Associated Press. In 2008, Vucci made several visits to Forward Operating Base Marez in Mosul, Iraq, profiling soldiers and their stories. His primary focus was a Cavalry Scout Platoon from Killer Troop, 3rd Squadron, 3rd Armored Cavalry Regiment (3 ACR). He spent several weeks embedded with the platoon filming their patrols and lives spent at a Combat Outpost in Western Mosul. Many of those soldiers were wounded and three were killed.

=== Notable images ===
==== Shoeing of George W. Bush ====
One of Vucci's most iconic shots came from Iraq while he was working for Associated Press. On Sunday, December 14, 2008, Vucci was at a joint press conference between United States President George W. Bush and Iraq Prime Minister Nouri al-Malik in Baghdad, capital city of Iraq. The joint press conference was to announce the signing of a status of forces agreement, which allowed the United States military to remain in Iraq. During the press conference, Iraqi journalist Muntadhar al-Zaidi threw his shoes at United States President George W. Bush.

==== George Floyd protests ====
In 2020, Vucci covered the George Floyd protests for the Associated Press. Serving as the chief photographer for the Associated Press in Washington, D.C., he was part of the AP reporting team that won the 2021 Pulitzer Prize for Breaking News Photography.

==== Attempted assassination of Donald Trump in Pennsylvania ====
On July 13, 2024, Vucci photographed former President and Republican Party nominee Donald Trump being led off stage after surviving an assassination attempt, with Trump's fist raised in the air and blood on the right side of his face. The most famous of those images was shared widely on social media and used as a cover image for Time.

==== Marco Rubio passing a note to Donald Trump on Middle East peace deal ====
On October 8, 2025, Vucci caught Secretary of State Marco Rubio passing a note to Donald Trump hinting a Middle East peace deal was near. Moments later, Trump told the room: "We're very close to a deal in the Middle East."
