= Fist pump =

Celebratory gesture

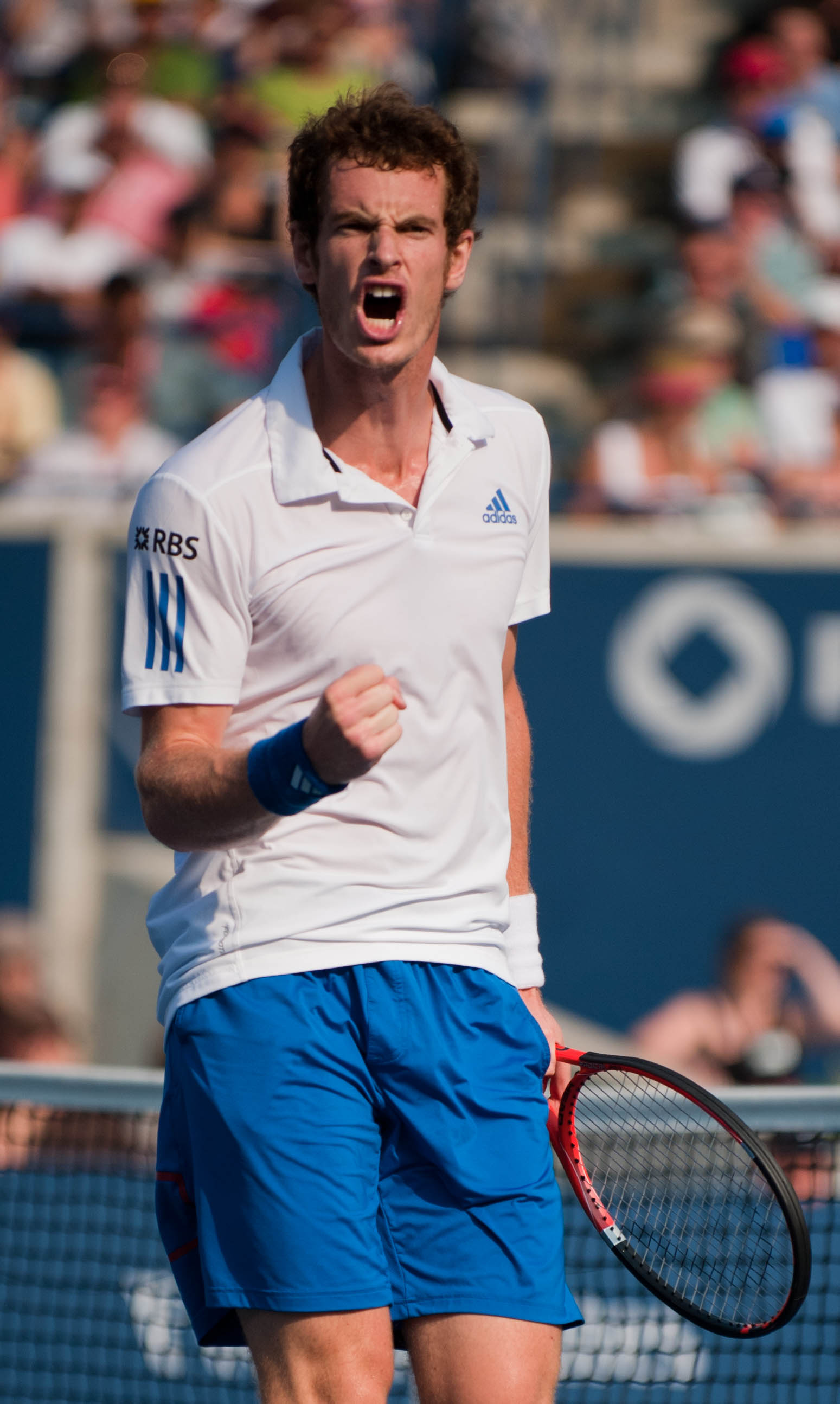
Andy Murray pumps his fist after beating Roger Federer.

The fist pump is a celebratory gesture involving a closed fist. The gesture has different permutations and meanings based on context of use. Variations include a fist that is raised before the torso and subsequently drawn down and nearer to the body in a vigorous, swift motion, often including an exclamation such as "Yes!" or a grunt. Another variation is when the fist is raised in the air then pumped up and down, or punched in a circular boxing motion. It is commonly seen in sporting events after a success, such as scoring a difficult goal.

Though the fist pump is commonly used in the sporting world it is also seen in broader culture. The television show Jersey Shore has been credited as helping to popularize an Italian-American influenced bro culture dubbed 'fist pumping culture', characterized by "wolfish males—sometimes hunting in packs—getting ripped at the gym and making sure their haircuts and outfits are optimized for maximum courting potential". The Rocky movie heroically depicts the "Italian Stallion" pumping his fist in the air after running up the steps of the Philadelphia Museum of Art at dawn. The closing scene of The Breakfast Club, which has been called the "iconic last shot of the movie", shows Judd Nelson's non-conformist character pumping his fist in the air as he walks alone from an empty football stadium into the night. Donald Trump did a fist pump moments after having been grazed by a bullet in an assassination attempt at a rally.

Raymond Slater fist pumped for 17 hours and 15 minutes to establish what he and local news coverage believed to be a "world record" (there is no Guinness World Record for fist pumping). It was 15 minutes longer than the 17 hours of fist pumping previously done by James Peterson.
