= Zito (surname) =

Zito is a surname of Italian origin.

== People with the name ==
- Antonio Zito (born 1986), Italian footballer
- Barry Zito (born 1978), American baseball pitcher
- Bill Zito (born 1964), American attorney and sports agent
- Carmelo Zito (1899–1980), Italian-American anti-fascist
- Chuck Zito (born 1953), American stuntman and actor
- Dominic Zito (born 1982), American choreographer
- Frank Zito (1893–1974), Sicilian-American Mafia member
- Greg Zito (1953–2025), American businessman, lobbyist, and politician in Illinois
- Johnny Zito (born 1982), American filmmaker
- Jonathan Zito (1965–1992), British manslaughter victim
- Joseph Zito (born 1946), American film director
- Mike Zito (born 1970), American singer-songwriter
- Mzwanele Zito (born 1988), South African rugby union player
- Nick Zito (born 1948), American horse trainer
- Richie Zito (born 1952), American songwriter
- Salena Zito, 21st-century American journalist and author
- Torrie Zito (1933–2009), American pianist and musical arranger-conductor

== Fictional characters ==
- Detective Lawrence "Larry" Zito, a character from Miami Vice

== See also ==
- Zito (disambiguation)
- Ziti (surname)
