= Attempted assassination of Donald Trump in Pennsylvania =

2024 shooting in Pennsylvania, U.S.

- Part of Security incidents involving Donald Trump
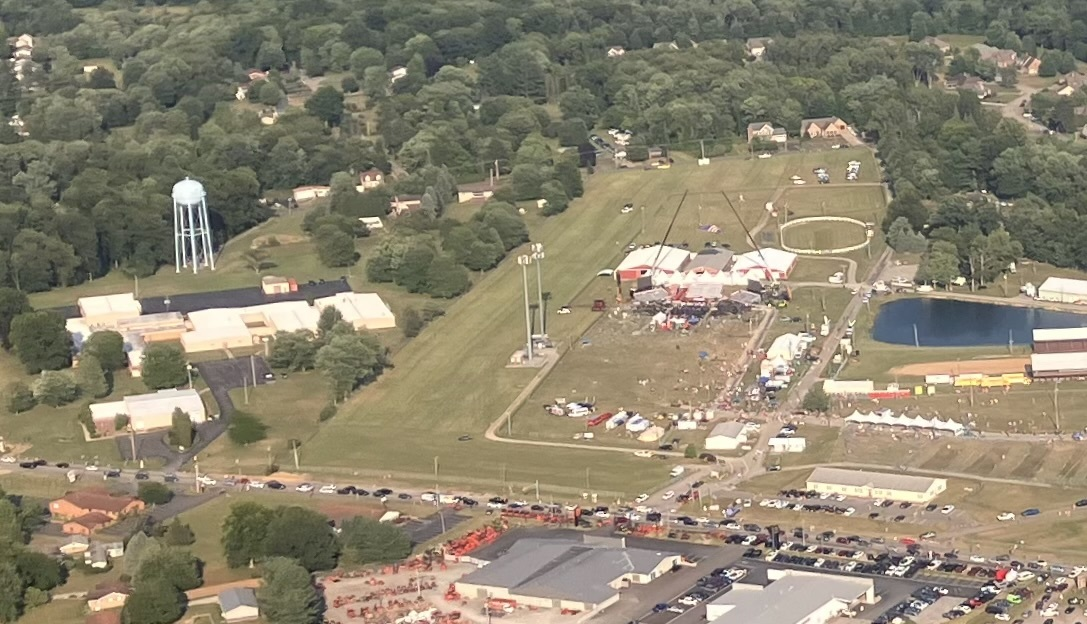
- Butler Farm Show Grounds (right), 6:01 p.m. EDT, 10 minutes before the shooting
- Location: 40°51′25″N 79°58′16″W; Butler Farm Show Grounds in Connoquenessing Twp. / Meridian, near Butler, Pennsylvania, U.S.
- Date: July 13, 2024; 2 years ago 6:11 p.m. (EDT; UTC−04:00)
- Target: Donald Trump
- Attack type: Attempted sniper assassination
- Weapon: DPMS Panther Arms DR-15 semi-automatic rifle
- Deaths: 3 (including the perpetrator) (Note: James Copenhaver, who was injured in the shooting, died on September 23, 2026. His lawyer declined to confirm a cause of death, citing a pending lawsuit, but Pennsylvania Attorney General Dave Sunday said that Copenhaver died of complications from injuries sustained in the shooting.)
- Injuries: 6 (2 from gunfire, (Note: A claimed third injury from gunfire—U.S. representative Ronny Jackson's nephew—has not been confirmed by independent sources; the sole source is Ronny Jackson.) including Trump, and 4 officers from debris)
- Perpetrator: Thomas Crooks
- Motive: Unknown (as of September 2026)
- Website: www.fbi.gov/news/press-releases/butler-investigation-updates

On July 13, 2024, Donald Trump, then a former president of the United States and the presumptive nominee of the Republican Party in the 2024 presidential election, survived an assassination attempt while speaking at an open-air campaign rally at the Butler Farm Show Grounds in Meridian, Pennsylvania, just outside the town of Butler. Trump was shot and wounded in his upper right ear by 20-year-old Thomas Crooks, who fired eight rounds from an AR-15–style rifle from a nearby building's roof. Even though Trump survived the shooting, Crooks still shot two other audience members, instantly killing Corey Comperatore and mortally wounding James Copenhaver, who died of complications from his injuries in 2026. Four seconds after he began firing, a member of the Butler County Emergency Service Unit (Note: Aaron Zaliponi) shot at him and hit Crooks's rifle, preventing him from firing more shots. Twelve seconds later, Crooks was shot and killed by the Counter Sniper Team of the United States Secret Service.

As shots were fired, Trump clasped his ear and took cover behind his lectern, where Secret Service agents shielded him until the shooter was killed. Evan Vucci, a photojournalist for the Associated Press, captured photographs of Trump with blood on his face and ear, pumping his fist in the air. During this, Trump was saying "Fight! Fight! Fight!" as agents escorted him offstage; the images went viral on social media. Trump was taken to a hospital, treated, and released later that day. He made his first public appearance after the shooting two days later at the 2024 Republican National Convention in Milwaukee, Wisconsin, wearing a bandage on his ear.

The incident is regarded as the Secret Service's most significant security failure since the attempted assassination of President Ronald Reagan in 1981. The director of the Secret Service, Kimberly Cheatle, faced bipartisan calls to resign when she testified before the United States House Committee on Oversight and Accountability on July 22; she stepped down the next day. President Joe Biden ordered an independent review of the security arrangements, condemned the violence, and called for a reduction in heated political rhetoric, emphasizing the importance of resolving political differences peacefully. Lawmakers called for increased security for major candidates in the election, and the Secret Service approved enhanced security measures, including the use of bulletproof glass at Trump's outdoor rallies.

The lack of security at the event and of public information about Crooks has spawned conspiracy theories. According to public opinion polls taken a month after the shooting, over half of Americans believed that Crooks did not act alone. Helen Comperatore, the widow of Corey Comperatore, has said she believes the US government plotted the shooting.

According to results from AP VoteCast/Fox News Voter Analysis, the assassination attempts that year galvanized Trump's supporters in the election. Of the 16% of 2024 election voters who called the assassination attempts against Trump the single most important factor to their vote, 81% supported him. While 52% of voters overall approved of the way Secret Service was handling its job, only about a third of Trump voters agreed.

== Background ==
At the time of the incident, Trump was the presumptive Republican nominee in the 2024 presidential election. The shooting occurred two days before the 2024 Republican National Convention in Milwaukee, Wisconsin. Another attempt at violence toward Trump happened during one of his rallies in 2016, when a man attempted to grab a police officer's gun at a rally outside Las Vegas.

On July 3, 2024, the Trump campaign announced that Trump would hold a rally on July 13 at the Butler Farm Show Grounds in Connoquenessing Township and Meridian (an area of Butler Township), near Butler, Pennsylvania. On July 10, an advance team began setting up for the rally, including the installation of generators in a large open field. The rally was part of the campaign's attempts to garner votes in Pennsylvania, a swing state with 19 votes in the Electoral College. Dave McCormick, the Republican nominee in the state's concurrent U.S. Senate election, was invited to appear onstage during the rally to increase support for his campaign.

=== Security arrangements ===
The Federal Bureau of Investigation had no information about any particular threats before the incident, but the Secret Service had increased Trump's security detail in recent weeks because of intelligence indicating that Iran was plotting to assassinate him. The acting Iranian minister of foreign affairs rejected this claim, saying that Iran wanted a "legal path to bring [Trump] to justice" for ordering the assassination of Qasem Soleimani.

U.S. Representative Mike Kelly said he had contacted the Trump campaign to recommend holding the rally in an area that could handle a larger crowd than the Butler Farm Show Grounds and that their response was: "We appreciate your input, but we've already made up our minds".

Before the incident, attendees at Trump rallies were screened for prohibited items, including weapons. The Secret Service also routinely screens and monitors buildings and businesses near such events, including structures outside security perimeters. The venue "had two layers of security—an outer area patrolled by state police and an inner perimeter manned by Secret Service agents, including an anti-sniper team on a roof behind the stage". Four counter-sniper teams were assigned to the event, two from the Secret Service and two from local law enforcement. One of them, comprising three snipers (local SWAT officer Greg Nicol, SWAT team member from Beaver County Jason Woods, and a third shooter from Butler County's SWAT team), was positioned inside a building owned by AGR International.

The Pennsylvania State Police, which serves as Connoquenessing Township's law enforcement agency, was also involved in security matters, while Butler Township police were given traffic duties. Butler City sent no law enforcement personnel, and the event was not within that city's boundary.

== Attempt ==
=== Lead-up to the shooting ===
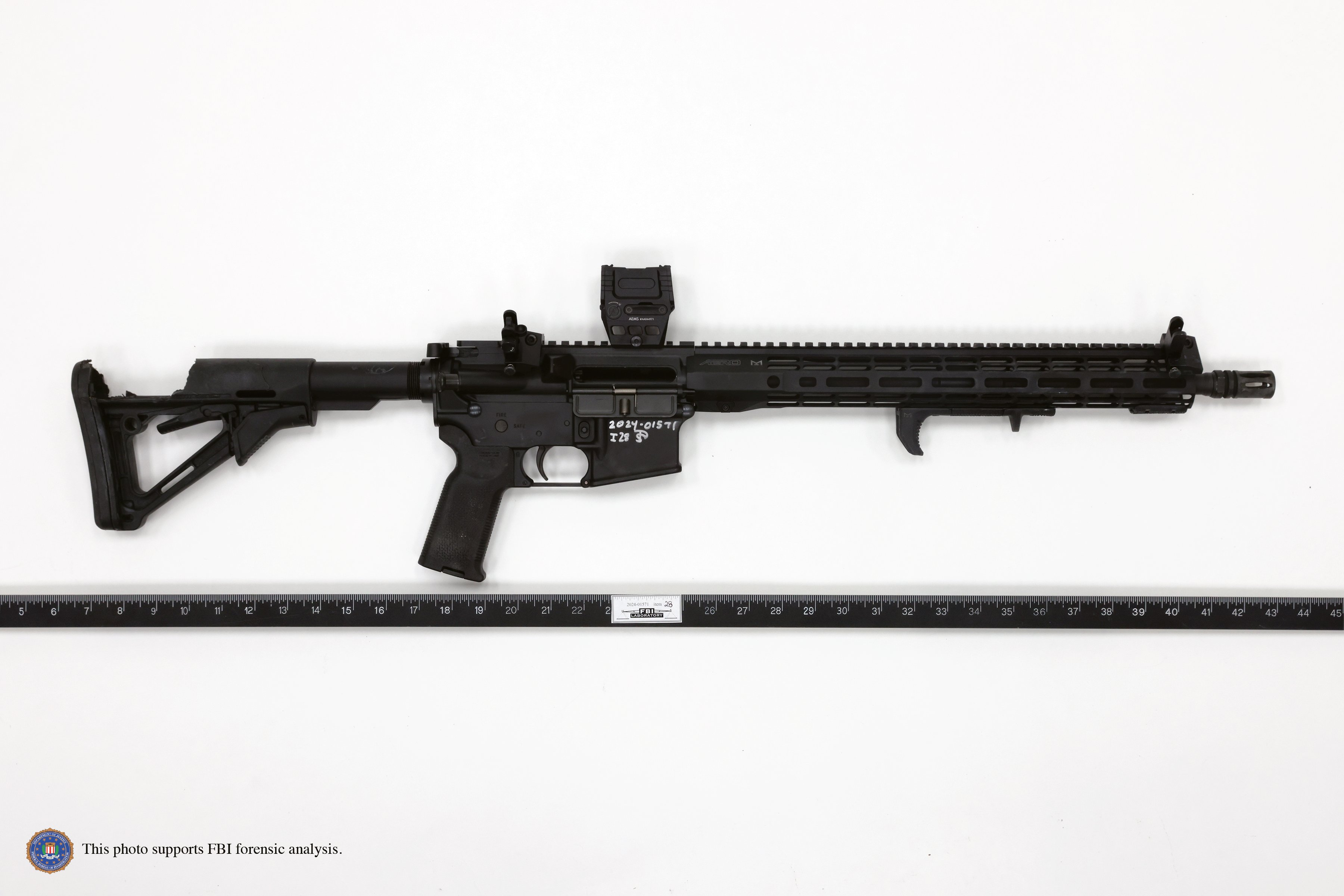
The AR-15 pattern rifle used by Crooks in the assassination attempt. The stock was damaged by counteracting gunfire.

On July 7, 2024, Thomas Matthew Crooks visited the Butler Farm Show grounds, the site of a future campaign rally Trump announced four days earlier. He spent 20 minutes there, having registered to attend the rally the previous day. On July 12, Crooks went to a shooting range and practiced with his rifle, a DPMS Panther Arms-produced AR-15–style rifle with a 16-inch (41 cm) barrel, chambered in 5.56×45mm NATO, which he had bought from his father. This rifle model is capable of a Minute of Angle (MOA) accuracy of 2-3 inches at 100 yards (91 m). An unmagnified Holosun AEMS red dot sight was attached to the rifle. Brandon Webb, a former Navy SEAL and the former head instructor of the SEAL Sniper course, said a well-trained shooter could hit a target with a high degree of accuracy using an AR-15 at the distance at which Crooks shot Trump, especially with a magnified optical gunsight, such as an ACOG.

On July 13, the day of the assassination attempt, Crooks bought a five-foot (1.5-meter) ladder before driving to the site of the rally in the morning. According to ABC News, a team of Beaver County SWAT officers (tasked with supporting the Secret Service) had taken its position at the security perimeter by mid-morning. Crooks left the rally site and bought 50 rounds of ammunition from a gun store, before driving back to the rally at 3:35 p.m. EDT, armed with his rifle and with an explosive device in the trunk of his car. Crooks did not undergo security screening, as he was outside the Secret Service's security perimeter for the rally. Around 3:50 p.m., Crooks flew a drone for about 11 minutes, showing the scene behind his eventual firing position.

At 4:26 p.m., a local law enforcement countersniper ended his shift and spotted Crooks around the southernmost warehouse of a complex owned by AGR International, in which police countersnipers were positioned. The countersniper texted his colleagues about Crooks, noting that Crooks might have known about the police presence inside the building. The New York Times described the text messages as suggesting that Crooks aroused police suspicion more than 90 minutes before the shooting. At 5:14, a countersniper still in the building saw Crooks directly underneath the warehouse and photographed him. The countersniper saw him "scoping out" the rooftop of the building and carrying a golf rangefinder, which particularly alarmed officers. The countersniper texted images of Crooks to other members of law enforcement before heading outside to find him and keep visual tabs on Crooks while backup arrived. Crooks ran from his position and evaded a search joined by four other local police officers. Law enforcement officers spotted Crooks between 20 minutes and 30 minutes before the shooting. Multiple local law enforcement officers identified Crooks and believed he might have been acting suspiciously near the event's magnetometer weapon detectors; they expressed their suspicions over radio, and the Secret Service was informed of this at some point.

Trump arrived onstage at about 6:03 p.m. At 6:05, he began speaking.

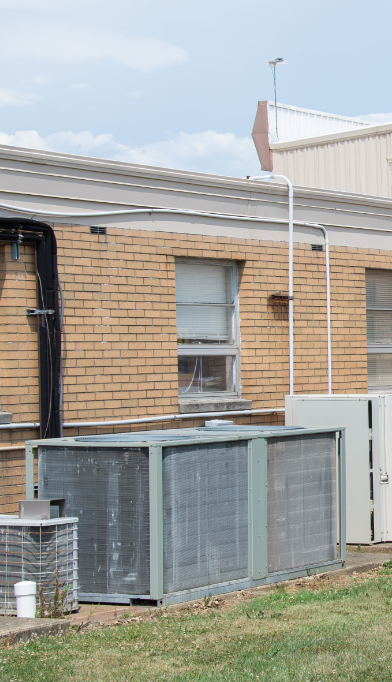
The air conditioning unit that Crooks used to access the roof

At 6:06, Crooks scaled an air conditioning unit between the northernmost AGR International buildings to reach the complex's roof, rather than using his ladder. He walked across a series of interconnected roofs to reach his firing position on the southernmost roof, between 400 feet (120 meters) and 450 feet (140 meters) north of the venue stage. The building housed three police snipers tasked with covering the rally, but none of them were on the roof due to a shortage of personnel.

Several bystanders witnessed Crooks on the roof and alerted the police about him minutes before shots were fired at Trump.

The slant of the roof that Crooks had been on may have prevented Secret Service snipers from seeing him as he crawled into a firing position; the northern sniper team's view of Crooks's position was also blocked by trees. Using a three-dimensional simulation of the shooting, the New York Times reported that "the gunman was largely concealed by two trees and the slope of a warehouse building roof, which he used as his perch."

At 6:08 p.m., a local law enforcement officer reported over radio, "Someone's on the roof". Police bodycam video footage revealed that, at this point, a search operation began in which at least four Pennsylvania law enforcement officers focused on the roof Crooks was on and its immediate surroundings, attempting to reach him. Hoisted by another officer, a Butler Township police officer attempted to climb to the roof of the building in search of Crooks. Crooks spotted the officer, whose hands were clinging to the edge of the roof, and aimed his rifle at the officer, who then let go, falling 8 feet (2.4 m) to the ground and severely injuring his ankle. According to ABC, this encounter, which occurred about 40 seconds before Crooks opened fire, was "the first time any law enforcement saw that the person on the roof had a gun".

=== Shooting ===
Approximate locations, including Secret Service counter-sniper teams

Crooks undertook the shooting immediately after the confrontation with the officer.

A few minutes into Trump's speech, starting at 6:11:33 p.m., Crooks fired eight shots into the rally, grazing Trump's right ear and striking three rallygoers, killing one instantly and mortally wounding a second who died in 2026, before being killed seconds later by a sniper from the Secret Service. As the shots were heard, rally attendees yelled "Duck!" Police bodycam footage captured the movements and responses of some of the law enforcement officials at the rally to the detected threat on a rooftop, which the BBC later called "moments of frustration, confusion and miscommunication". Two shots were fired toward Crooks. Aaron Zaliponi, a member of Butler County's Emergency Services Unit, fired the first shot four seconds after Crooks began shooting at Trump. The bullet is believed to have struck Crooks's rifle stock, causing it to fragment and send debris flying, which hit his face, neck, and right shoulder. The impact forced Crooks to stop shooting and reposition himself. On a building behind Trump's left shoulder, a team of Secret Service countersnipers were facing in a different direction and reoriented toward Crooks to aim a second shot at him before he could resume firing; a member of that team fatally shot Crooks 16 seconds after he had begun firing.

The upper part of Trump's right ear was grazed by the first bullet Crooks fired. Trump raised a hand to his ear before dropping down on his podium behind the lectern for cover. Secret Service agents lunged toward Trump and shielded him. After the assailant was declared "down", agents helped Trump get up. Blood was visible on his ear and face. He asked the Secret Service agents to let him get his shoes. According to Trump, the agents "hit me so hard that my shoes fell off, and my shoes are tight". They also offered to put him on a stretcher, but he declined. As he was walked off the venue stage, Trump told the Secret Service agents to wait and then raised his fist, pumped it at the crowd, and mouthed the words "Fight! Fight! Fight!" The crowd responded with cheers and chants of "U-S-A!"

When I rose surrounded by Secret Service, the crowd was confused because they thought I was dead. And there was great, great sorrow. I could see that on their faces as I looked out. They didn't know I was looking out, they thought it was over. But I could see it, I wanted to do something to let 'em know I was ok. I raised my right arm, looked at the thousands and thousands of people that were breathlessly waiting and started shouting, Fight! Fight! Fight!

— Donald Trump

Trump was then escorted to a vehicle and taken to the nearby Butler Memorial Hospital.

Trump credited a large chart displaying immigration statistics with saving his life. Immediately before the first shot, he turned his head to his right, toward the chart, and pointed to it. The movement narrowed the profile of Trump's skull toward the direction of the shooter, possibly saving him from a direct gunshot wound to his skull. Trump later said, "If I hadn't pointed at that chart and turned my head to look at it, that bullet would have hit me right in the head." Trump had said "That chart's a couple of months old and if you want to really see something that's sad, take a look at what happened" when Crooks cut him off.

=== Timeline ===
Time (EDT)	Event	Ref.
~9:30 a.m.	Thomas Matthew Crooks purchases a ladder from a Home Depot store in Bethel Park.	
~10:00 a.m.	Crooks drives to the Butler Farm Show Grounds, the rally site, staying slightly longer than one hour.	
~11:10 a.m.	Crooks drives back to Bethel Park and purchases 50 rounds of ammunition from Allegheny Arms & Gun Works.	
~3:35 p.m.	Crooks arrives again at the rally site.	
~3:50 p.m.	Crooks flies a drone for about 11 minutes, showing the scene behind his eventual firing position.	
4:26 p.m.	After a local law enforcement countersniper positioned in the AGR International warehouse ends his shift and spots Crooks while leaving, he notifies other countersnipers in the warehouse that Crooks saw him leave the warehouse and may now know that law enforcement is positioned inside.	
5:06 p.m.	Crooks is twice videotaped outside the secured perimeter by a citizen filming the crowd.	
5:14 p.m.	Police officers twice photograph Crooks near the event's magnetometer weapon detectors, having assessed him as acting suspiciously.	
5:38 p.m.	Photographs showing Crooks as he uses a rangefinder are shared among Beaver Country Emergency Services Unit members.	
5:44 p.m.	Ed Lenz, the tactical commander of the Butler County mobile unit, tells a Pennsylvania State Police officer in a trailer about 300 yards (270 m) from the rally about Crooks. He then texts the officer a photograph of Crooks.	
5:51 p.m.	The Pennsylvania State Police officer forwards the image of Crooks to his Secret Service counterparts in the trailer.	
5:52 p.m.	The Secret Service notifies its counter-sniper team and response agents of a suspicious person with a rangefinder on the ground.	
5:54 p.m.	Lenz tells traffic-control officers that his unit has lost sight of Crooks.	
6:02 p.m.	As Trump prepares to walk onstage, a Beaver County sniper sees Crooks, who walks with a backpack into a dead end between the northernmost AGR buildings.	
6:03 p.m.	Trump walks to his podium.	
6:05:12 p.m.	Trump begins speaking.	
6:06 p.m.	Crooks scales an air-conditioning unit to access the roof of the AGR International complex while officers search for him on the ground.	
6:08:21 p.m.	As Crooks walks across a series of interconnected roofs to reach the southernmost warehouse of the AGR International complex, a local law enforcement officer reports via radio, "Someone's on the roof". At least four Pennsylvania law enforcement officers begin an effort to reach Crooks.	
6:09 p.m.	Several bystanders notice a person carrying a rifle on a distant roof and report their sightings to law enforcement officers.	
6:10:55 p.m.	Hoisted by another officer, a Butler Township police officer attempts to climb onto the rooftop where Crooks stands. Crooks aims his rifle at the officer, and the officer releases his grip, falling 8 feet (2.4 m) to the ground and severely injuring his ankle; the officer's bodycam records the event. The officer reports via radio that Crooks is armed with a "long gun". Lenz requests deployment of the Butler County quick response force, located near the AGR International complex.	
6:11:33 p.m.	Crooks fires the first of eight shots into the rally venue. Trump pauses his speech mid-sentence as the shot is fired.	
6:11:34 p.m.	Trump raises his hand to his right ear. Crooks fires two more shots.	
6:11:35 p.m.	Trump drops behind his lectern for cover as Secret Service agents start moving toward the podium to surround him.	
6:11:37 p.m.	Crooks fires five more shots. A member of Butler County's Emergency Services Unit fires a shot that hits Crooks's rifle stock, which fragments into debris that hits his face, neck, and right shoulder. Crooks stops firing and repositions himself.	
6:11:49 p.m.	After a team of Secret Service countersnipers on a building behind Trump's left shoulder reorients toward Crooks, a member of the team fatally shoots Crooks.	
6:12:25 p.m.	Secret Service agents lift Trump, preparing to walk him offstage.	
6:12:33 p.m.	Trump requests that the Secret Service agents wait while he gets his shoes.	
6:12:47 p.m.	Secret Service agents begin escorting Trump offstage while Trump raises his fist, pumps it at the crowd, and begins mouthing the words "Fight! Fight! Fight!"	
6:14 p.m.	Trump is escorted to a vehicle and taken to Butler Memorial Hospital (BMH) for examination.	
6:40 p.m.	The BMH emergency room is cleared and Trump begins receiving treatment.	
6:51 p.m.	The Trump campaign releases a statement describing Trump as "fine" as he is medically examined.	
8:42 p.m.	Trump posts a statement on Truth Social about the assassination attempt.	
8:53 p.m.	Trump's motorcade leaves BMH bound for Pittsburgh International Airport (PIT).	
10:49 p.m.	Trump's motorcade arrives at PIT. Trump is "held in place" at the airport.	
11:21 p.m.	Trump leaves PIT on a flight to Newark Liberty International Airport.	

== Victims ==
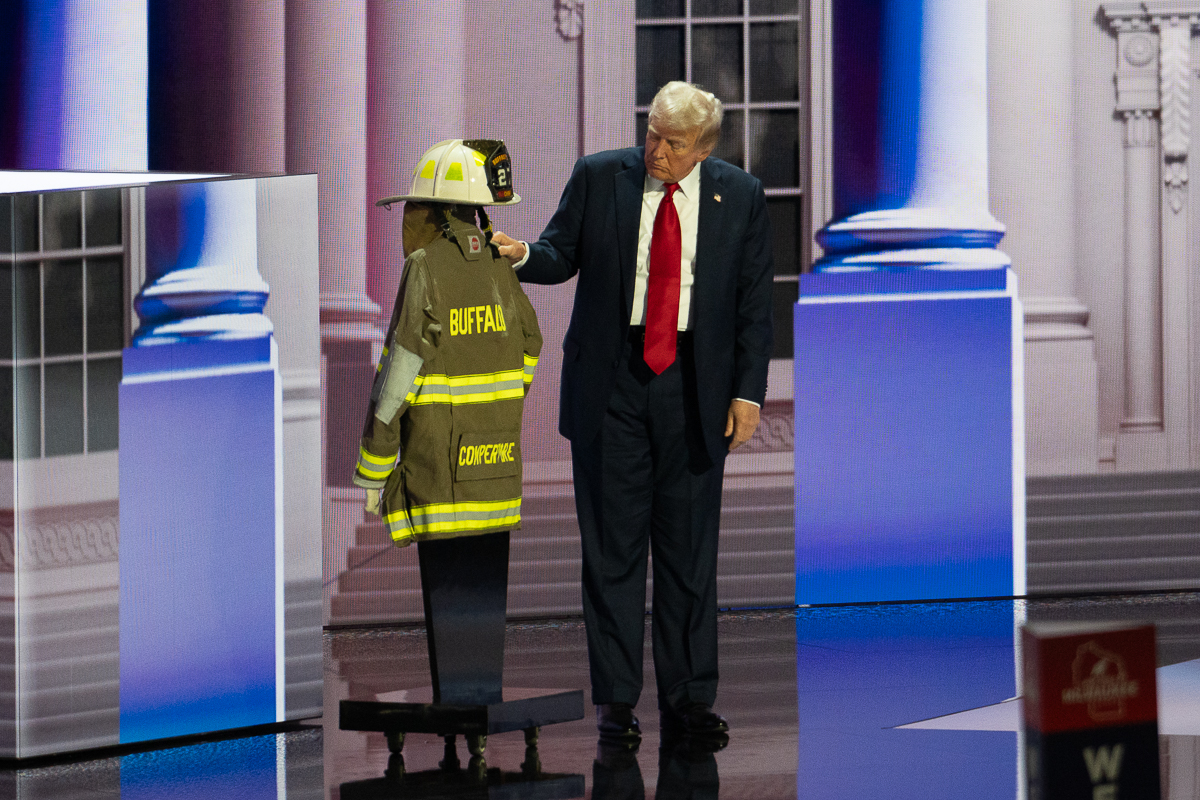
Trump standing alongside Corey Comperatore's fire department uniform while delivering his July 18 acceptance speech at the 2024 Republican National Convention

Corey Comperatore of Sarver, Pennsylvania, was killed by gunfire. Comperatore, aged 50, worked as a project and tooling engineer and was the former chief of the Buffalo Township Volunteer Fire Company. According to Comperatore's family and Pennsylvania governor Josh Shapiro, he died while shielding his wife and two daughters from gunfire. A number of other people were injured. Two male audience members, aged 57 and 74, were shot and critically injured. Both were listed as in stable condition the next day. The 57-year-old victim was discharged from the hospital on July 24; the 74-year-old, Jim Copenhaver, of Moon Township, Pennsylvania, was discharged on July 26. Both sued the United States Department of Homeland Security in 2026, alleging negligent security measures. Copenhaver died on September 23, 2026. According to Pennsylvania attorney general Dave Sunday, Copenhaver died from complications stemming from the wounds he sustained in the shooting, but his lawyer declined to disclose the cause of death, citing a pending lawsuit.

U.S. representative Ronny Jackson said that a bullet grazed his nephew's neck, which was treated by medical personnel at the scene. Four Pittsburgh Police officers, who were feet away from Trump, suffered minor injuries from flying debris when bullets struck objects nearby.

== Perpetrator ==
Photograph of Thomas Crooks taken by local law enforcement snipers an hour before the assassination attempt

On July 14, the FBI identified the shooter as 20-year-old Thomas Matthew Crooks of Bethel Park, Pennsylvania, which is about an hour's drive from the rally venue. The FBI believes Crooks acted alone. The rifle he used was legally bought in 2013 by his father, who sold it to Crooks in October 2023. Crooks had no criminal record. The FBI said he had "no indication of any mental health issues".

Crooks graduated from Bethel Park High School in 2022 and from Community College of Allegheny County two months before the shooting. He worked as a dietary aide at a nearby nursing home. Some people who knew him characterized him as quiet, and a former classmate said he had been bullied "every day" at school for wearing camouflage to class. Most neighbors also described Crooks as quiet and as a "normal person". He was a member of the Clairton Sportsmen's Club, which has a 200-yard (180 m) rifle range.

After the shooting, the FBI discovered a social media account "believed to be associated with the shooter" with about 700 comments from 2019 to 2020. Reports about the posts' content vary. Gab CEO Andrew Torba said that posts requested from his platform by the FBI were "pro-Biden's immigration policy", while FBI deputy director Paul Abbate called Crooks's activity on social networking services antisemitic, anti-immigrant, extreme, and espousing political violence. Crooks's Internet activity before the attack included searches related to the 2021 Oxford High School shooting and for other politicians and their events.

In 2025, it was discovered that Crooks had at least 17 social media accounts, including on YouTube, Snapchat and Venmo. Before that, the FBI's latest statement on Crooks's social media presence had been its July 30, 2024, testimony that it had found one account believed to belong to Crooks.

Crooks was a registered Republican; his voter registration had been active since September 2021, the month he turned 18. Federal campaign finance records show that on January 20, 2021, when he was 17, Crooks donated $15 to a voter turnout group, the Progressive Turnout Project, through ActBlue, used by Democrats and progressive organizations.

== Aftermath ==
=== Immediate aftermath ===
Trump was transported to Butler Memorial Hospital for examination immediately after the shooting. The Secret Service had already called hospital officials and asked that the hospital be put on lockdown, putting into action an emergency plan that was created for when Trump spoke at another nearby rally in 2020. The lockdown lasted approximately three hours, with law enforcement from the Secret Service, FBI, Homeland Security, Pittsburgh police, and Butler police guarding the hospital's entrances. Shortly after his arrival, a Secret Service spokesperson confirmed that Trump was safe. According to journalist Jonathan Karl, Trump was quick to ask his aides how the shooting had been publicized, asking "How is it playing on TV" and remarking "We're going to make some big news, aren't we?"

After Trump underwent several tests at the hospital, his motorcade left the hospital at around 9:30 p.m. EDT for Pittsburgh International Airport. Trump landed in Newark Liberty International Airport in New Jersey in the early hours of July 14 and spent the night at Trump National Golf Club Bedminster. Security at Trump Tower and the RNC was strengthened after the shooting.

About two hours after arriving at the hospital, Trump posted a statement on his social media platform, Truth Social:

I want to thank The United States Secret Service, and all of Law Enforcement, for their rapid response on the shooting that just took place in Butler, Pennsylvania. Most importantly, I want to extend my condolences to the family of the person at the Rally who was killed, and also to the family of another person that was badly injured. It is incredible that such an act can take place in our Country. Nothing is known at this time about the shooter, who is now dead. I was shot with a bullet that pierced the upper part of my right ear. I knew immediately that something was wrong in that I heard a whizzing sound, shots, and immediately felt the bullet ripping through the skin. Much bleeding took place, so I realized then what was happening. GOD BLESS AMERICA!

— Donald Trump

No information about Trump's medical care was released during the week after the shooting. Representative Ronny Jackson, Trump's former White House physician, released limited statements about Trump's injury and treatment on July 20 and 26, but neither Trump's attending physician nor Butler Memorial Hospital physicians made any statements, and some questions about Trump's diagnosis and treatment remained unanswered.

==== Republican National Convention ====
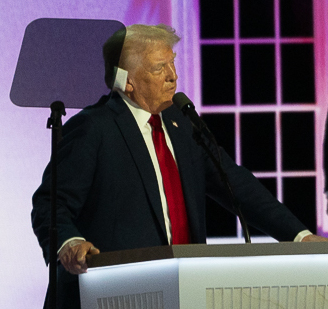
Trump wearing a bandage on his ear at the 2024 Republican National Convention

Trump attended the Republican National Convention (RNC) on July 15 with a bandage covering his entire right ear. Several RNC attendees began wearing fake ear bandages during the convention, with a Republican strategist telling the Washington Post, "It was truly a surreal moment that people are still processing, and this is a recognizable show of solidarity in a meme-ified political moment." The fad reportedly started with Arizona delegate Joe Neglia, who said he made his bandage on the way to Milwaukee after seeing Trump wearing one during his first appearance after the attempt.

The Trump campaign organized a GoFundMe fundraising campaign for the rally goers who were wounded or killed, raising over $2 million by July 14. Comperatore's firefighting uniform, with his name misspelled by the fire department as "Compertore", was brought on stage during Trump's speech at the RNC. Trump kissed Comperatore's helmet. Comperatore's funeral was held the next day on July 19.

After the shooting, stocks linked to Trump's media and technology interests surged, as did shares of other companies that could benefit from a Trump presidency, such as cryptocurrency stocks and gun stocks. Trump Media & Technology Group shares soared 31%, lifting its stock market value to $7.7 billion, and major cryptocurrency-related stocks, including Coinbase and bitcoin miners Riot Platforms and Marathon Digital, saw increases of 11% to 18%.

According to CNN, the exchange of public interventions in the event's aftermath was followed by tensions between local law enforcement officials and the Secret Service.

=== Investigation ===
The FBI led an investigation with the United States Department of Justice National Security Division, the U.S. Secret Service, and the Bureau of Alcohol, Tobacco, Firearms, and Explosives. The incident was investigated as an assassination attempt and as an act of domestic terrorism.

Police removed Crooks's corpse from the rooftop. He was carrying no identification. The FBI confirmed his identity via fingerprint biometrics and DNA profiling. Explosives were found at Crooks's home and in the car he used to travel to the rally. A remote transmitter was found in his pocket. Crooks owned two smartphones and at least one laptop.

On July 14, the FBI announced that its technical specialists had successfully gained access to Crooks's phone and were continuing to analyze other devices. An Electronic Frontier Foundation researcher said this was likely done with a Cellebrite device or an in-house method, while digital forensics expert Josh Brunty told NBC News that such access has become routine given advances in forensic technology since the 2015 San Bernardino case. They found that Crooks had searched for images of Trump, President Joe Biden—then Trump's opponent in the election—and several other public figures, and that he had looked up dates of Trump's rallies and the Democratic National Convention. Investigators also found that in April 2024, Crooks had searched "major depressive disorder", but it has not been determined whether he was diagnosed. FBI director Christopher Wray discovered that on July 6, Crooks had searched for "how far was Oswald away from Kennedy", referencing the assassination of John F. Kennedy, and that he had registered for Trump's rally that day. The FBI had also discovered that Crooks flew a drone near the rally two hours before the assassination attempt. A week after the shooting, Crooks's body was cremated.

On July 25, the FBI said it wanted to interview Trump, as a crime victim, to obtain his victim statement. In a July 29 Fox News interview, Trump said that he expected the FBI interview to take place on August 1. FBI's Office of Public Affairs released a statement on July 27 saying, "What struck former President Trump in the ear was a bullet, whether whole or fragmented into smaller pieces, fired from the deceased subject's rifle." A New York Times analysis of the events, including bullet trajectories and other information, concluded that the first bullet Crooks fired grazed Trump's ear.

During a Senate hearing, Secret Service acting director Ronald Rowe could not explain how Crooks got his rifle onto the rooftop of the AGR International warehouse; the BBC called it a "remaining mystery" of the investigation. There was some conflict in Senate testimony about the FBI's investigation of what wounded Trump, with Wray saying on July 24 that there was some question about whether a bullet or shrapnel hit Trump's ear, and FBI deputy director Abbate saying on July 30 that there was never any doubt that a bullet had struck Trump's ear.

A bipartisan U.S. House task force was launched on July 29 to investigate the attempted assassination. On October 21, it released its interim report, based on 23 interviews with local law enforcement officials and other documentation. According to Representative Mike Waltz, a member of the task force, Crooks had online accounts on platforms based in Belgium, New Zealand, and Germany. The accounts are encrypted and their purpose remains unknown.

In response to a public records request weeks after the assassination attempt, police bodycam footage from the day of the rally was released. According to the New York Times, the footage provided more clarity about the movements of nearby law enforcement officers than previous releases of data.

Department of Homeland Security Secretary Alejandro Mayorkas appointed an independent panel of former law enforcement officials to make recommendations. On October 16, 2024, they issued a report saying that Secret Service leadership should be overhauled.

On December 5, 2024, acting Secret Service director Rowe testified before Congress, taking responsibility for the agency's failures and outlining corrective measures. He announced initiatives including enhanced technical assets, expanded staffing, improved retention efforts, and a new "chief wellness officer" to support mental health. These reforms aimed to address gaps in intelligence, communication, and protective protocols. During one exchange, Texas Representative Pat Fallon criticized Rowe for not deploying additional protective units and for his absence from the rally site after the attack. Fallon also accused Rowe of not properly protecting those in attendance at a 9/11 ceremony from the World Trade Center site in New York City earlier that year, while Rowe accused Fallon of politicizing 9/11. This led to a shouting match between the two. Once it concluded, Rowe refused to answer questions, emphasizing ongoing improvements and rejecting claims of politicizing his role. That same day, the Congressional Task Force released its final report, which concluded, among other findings, that Crooks had "exploited gaps in protection because of a lack of assets and staff."

The FBI investigation concluded in November 2025. It found that Crooks acted alone, with no clear motive.

FBI evidence from the assassination attempt
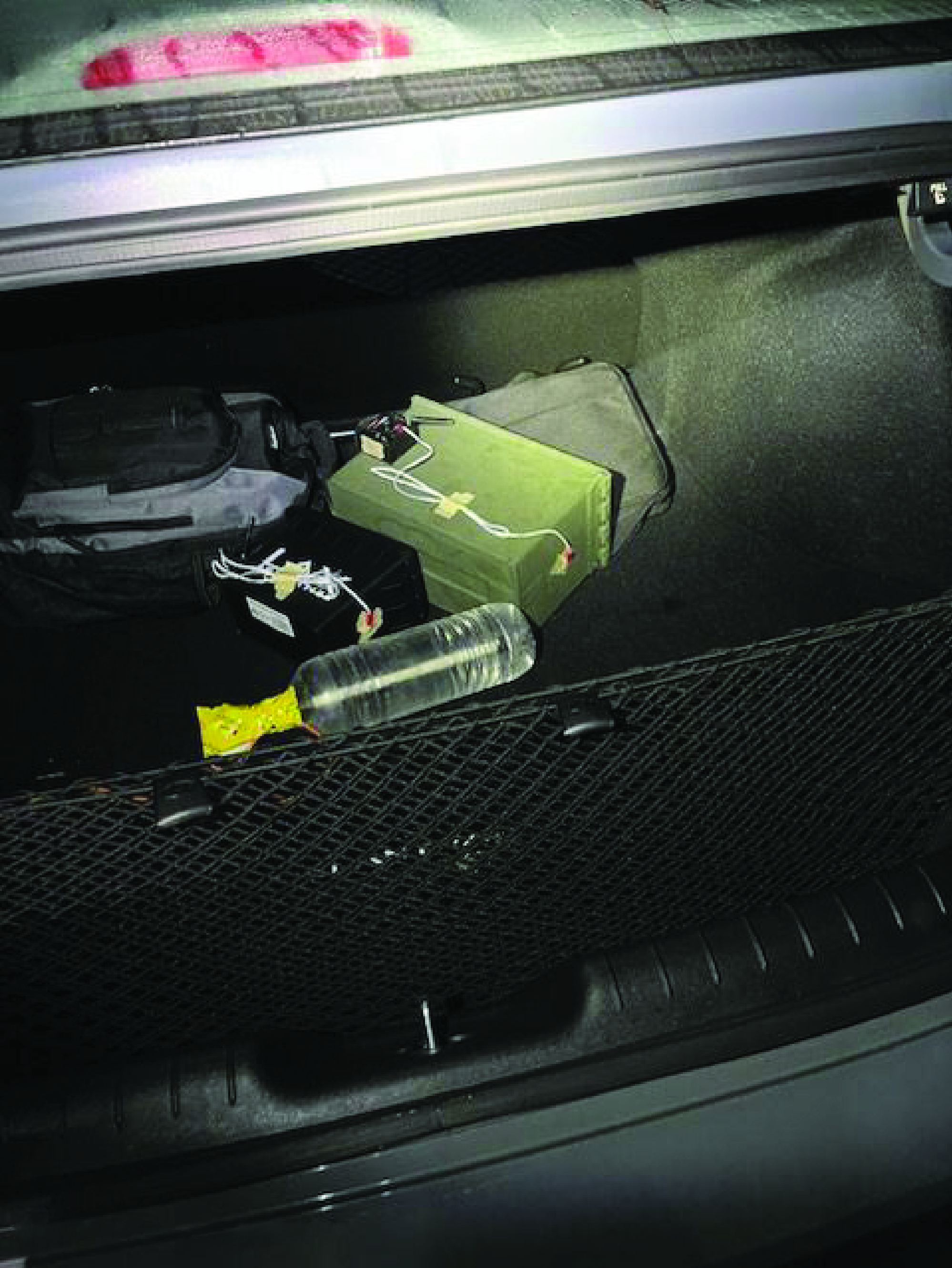
Improvised explosive devices in the car trunk of Crooks found by the FBI

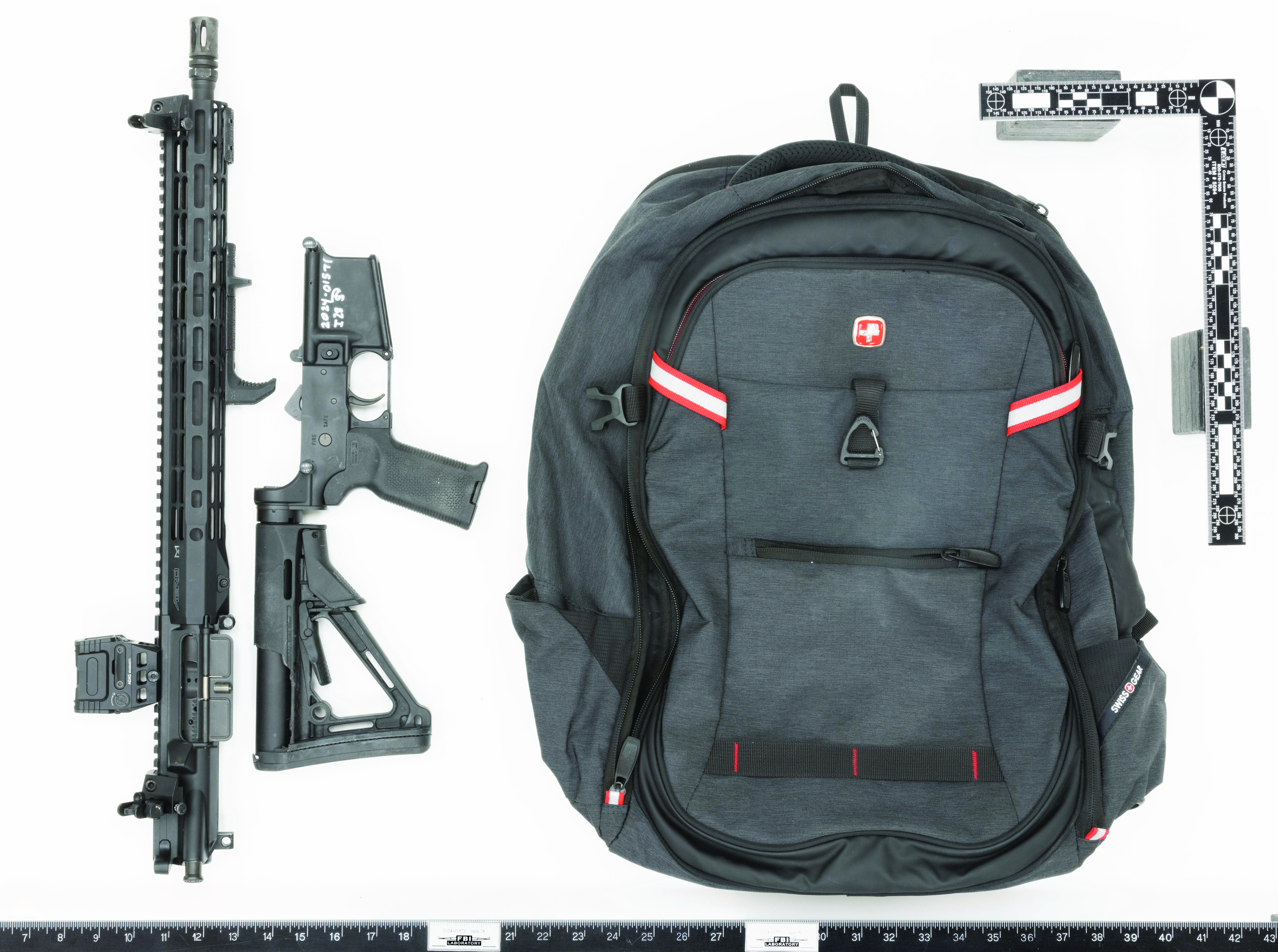
The rifle and backpack used by Crooks at the assassination attempt

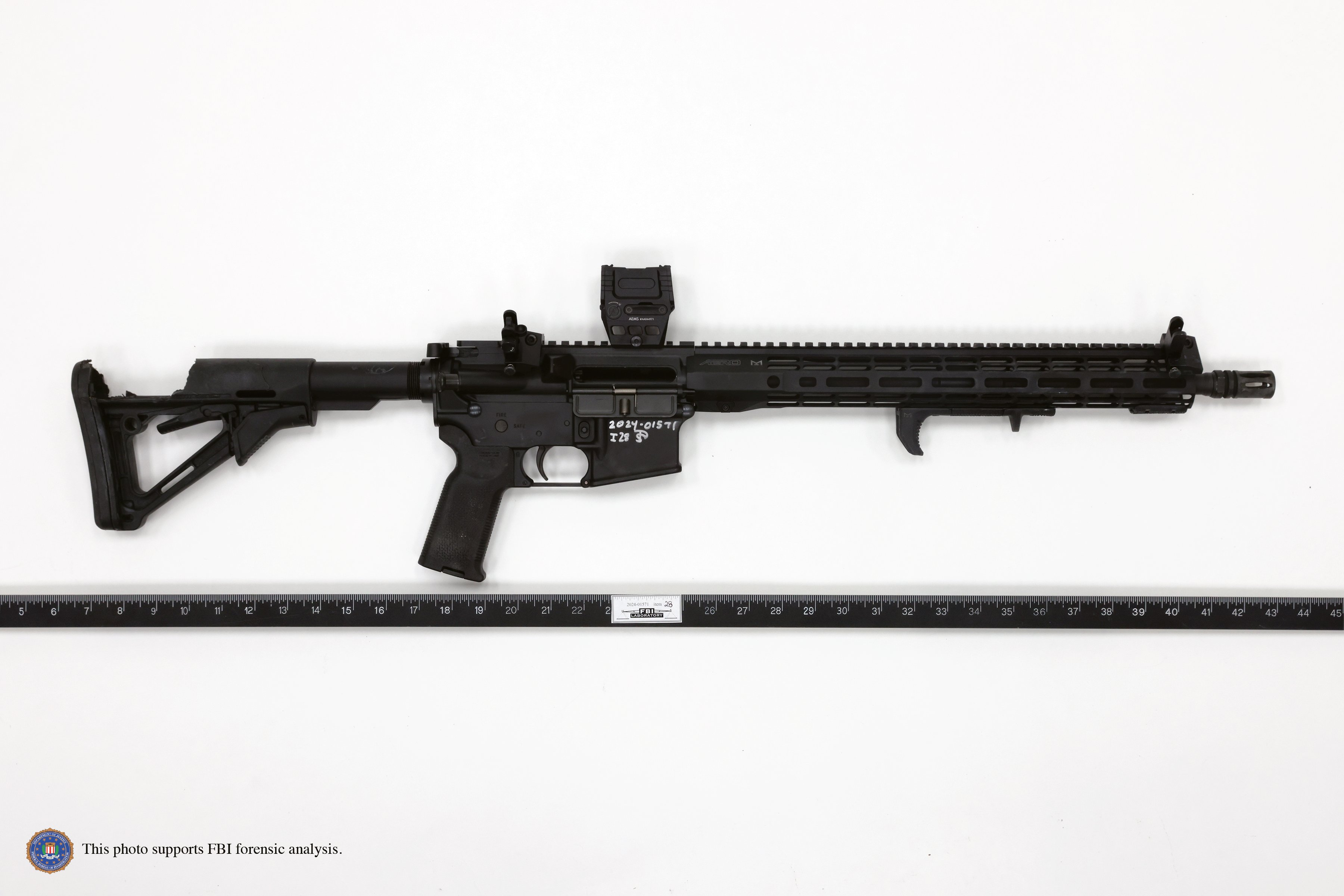
The rifle used by Crooks during the assassination attempt, with visible damage to the stock of the firearm after being struck by police gunfire at Crooks

==== Motive ====
Authorities and experts offered several speculative theories about the motive for the attack and Crooks's intentions.

One investigative lead is looking into whether the attack was politically motivated. The FBI said that Crooks's political beliefs are unclear; the limited information about them has been called contradictory; for example, Crooks both was a registered Republican and donated to ActBlue.

Another line of thinking proposed by authorities is that Crooks may have intended to carry out a larger mass-casualty attack or mass shooting at the rally, rather than singularly target Trump. This is based on discoveries made on Crooks's phone, including internet searches about the Oxford High School shooting and a photo of its perpetrator, Ethan Crumbley, on the device. The discovery of an explosive device, bulletproof vest, and additional magazines in Crooks's vehicle at the rally has also been suggested as indicating a larger planned attack. Additionally, several explosive devices were recovered from Crooks's home. The assassination attempt fits some definitions of a mass shooting, but it is unclear whether this was intentional on Crooks's part.

Experts have offered varying opinions on this. James Densley, founder of the Violence Project, a research organization focused on mass shootings and their perpetrators, suggested Crooks might be "somebody intent on perpetrating mass violence, and they happened to pick a political rally". Kathleen Pickett, a former behavioral analyst for the FBI, suggested that Crooks was not "ready for an assault", citing his lack of body armor and use of a single firearm. As of November 20, 2024, U.S. federal agencies and the House task force were still working to determine Crooks's motive.

=== Criticism of security arrangements ===
The Secret Service security detail responsible for protecting Trump during the rally faced criticism and intense scrutiny for not securing access to the roof of the building from which Crooks committed the shooting. Three police snipers were in the building, but none were on the roof or able to cover it. Local law-enforcement sources interviewed by BeaverCountian.com said this was due to "extremely poor planning" and manpower shortages. Democratic and Republican lawmakers expressed concern about what they perceived as errors or oversights that exposed Trump to gunfire. The Secret Service said it added protective resources to accommodate campaign travel schedules, disputing claims that it did not provide requested extra protection for Trump. Secret Service Director Kimberly Cheatle called the lapse "unacceptable". In a reversal, the Secret Service later acknowledged denying Trump campaign requests for additional security for the past two years. The requests included additional snipers and special teams for outdoor events. A failure in inter-agency communications has also been pointed out.

Several prominent politicians and officials, including Tim Burchett of Tennessee and Cory Mills of Florida, argued that DEI hiring of more women by the Biden administration had compromised Secret Service training. Cheatle and female agents in Trump's security detail faced scrutiny, especially after the release of video showing one of the agents struggling to holster her weapon and crouching behind Trump. Trump spoke in defense of a female agent who shielded him as he was escorted off stage, commending her bravery.

Biden instructed the Secret Service to reassess all security protocols for the Republican National Convention in Milwaukee, where Trump was expected to be officially nominated as the Republican candidate for the presidential election on November 5. Biden also ordered an independent review on the federal security the Secret Service provided in order to ascertain how Crooks nearly assassinated Trump with a clear sightline. The independent review was published in October 2024.

The independent presidential candidate Robert F. Kennedy Jr. was approved to receive Secret Service protection two days after the assassination attempt against Trump. Kennedy had previously sought protection from the Secret Service but was denied by Department of Homeland Security Secretary Alejandro Mayorkas. Kennedy had instead been relying on a private security firm.

Secret Service Director Kimberly Cheatle testifies in Congress before the United States House Committee on Oversight and Accountability; July 22, 2024

On July 22, Cheatle testified before the United States House Committee on Oversight and Accountability; the New York Times reported that she failed to answer basic questions about the assassination attempt. Lawmakers from both parties called for her resignation. On July 23, Cheatle's resignation was announced. In January 2025, Trump appointed Sean M. Curran, one of the Secret Service agents who protected him during the assassination attempt, director of the Secret Service.

According to The New York Times, the law enforcement agencies that assisted the Secret Service the day of the shooting were the Pennsylvania State Police, the Butler Township Police Department, the Butler County Sheriff, Pittsburgh Bureau of Police, and multicounty tactical teams. The Pennsylvania State Police commissioner testified that officers at the event were busy responding to over 100 heat-related emergencies, and handling multiple reports of suspicious individuals at the rally, which was not considered unusual.

According to The New York Times, the Secret Service rejected offers to use a drone to support their surveillance at the Butler rally site.

On July 10, 2025, six Secret Service agents received short-term suspensions. Trump said on My View with Lara Trump, "There were mistakes made, and that shouldn't have happened."

=== Photographs ===
External image
- Photograph of a bloodied Trump raising his fist shortly after the assassination attempt. This image was part of a series of photographs by the photojournalist Evan Vucci that were widely circulated after the attempt.

The photojournalist Evan Vucci of the Associated Press captured widely praised images of a bloodied Trump pumping his fist in the air, surrounded by Secret Service members, with a U.S. flag in the background. The photos quickly spread on social media and television and were widely circulated by Trump's allies, including the National Republican Senatorial Committee, family members, and Republican members of Congress. The images were seen as encapsulating strength, resilience, patriotism, Trump himself, the United States, and the country's ongoing culture war.

Also widely reproduced and discussed was an image by New York Times photographer Doug Mills apparently showing a bullet passing Trump. Journalists compared this image to other iconic photographs capturing singular events in U.S. history and remarked on the improbability of capturing a bullet speeding past the subject of an attempted assassination. Mills said, "One forensic guy told me it's between one in a million and one in 5 million chances" to capture a bullet in flight with a regular camera. Mills, Vucci, and other photojournalists were commended for their bravery in continuing to record after the outbreak of gunfire instead of fleeing for their safety. Immediately after Mills's image was published, some social media users doubted the photo was authentic, suspecting the bullet was doctored into the image and questioning whether a camera could capture a rifle bullet in flight. Several news sites, blogs, and commentators, including The New York Times and Michael Harrigan, a retired FBI agent the Times consulted, concluded that it was indeed possible for Mills's camera to capture a bullet in flight. Mills was shooting with a shutter speed of 1/8,000th of a second, while the bullet likely had a muzzle velocity of approximately 3,200 feet per second. The bullet would have slowed considerably as it traveled 400–450 feet to reach Trump, but even at its maximum velocity, it would have been slow enough to move roughly 5 inches while the camera shutter was open, well within the camera's field of view, and roughly corresponding to the size of the streak in the image. Harrigan concluded, "Given the circumstances, if that's not showing the bullet's path through the air, I don't know what else it would be." Harrigan said the image might have captured either the bullet itself or a streak of air displaced by the bullet's motion, but the Times and other reputable outlets have affirmed the image's authenticity.

== Reactions ==
The incident was the most serious attempt to kill a U.S. president or presidential candidate since Ronald Reagan was shot in 1981. Political scientists, historians, and many political figures pointed to the shooting as a consequence of political polarization in the United States. The shooting led to widespread sympathy for Trump on social media and public figures across the political spectrum both domestically and internationally urged a decrease in tensions, condemning the assassination attempt.

Journalist Salena Zito, who was present at the event, published a book, Butler: The Untold Story of the Near Assassination of Donald Trump and the Fight for America's Heartland, in 2025. It debuted as a #1 on The New York Times Best Seller list.

External videos
- Elon Musk and Alice Weidel saying "Fight Fight Fight" at the AfD rally

During Elon Musk's 2024 Alternative für Deutschland (AfD) campaign rally appearance, he smiled, pumped his fists in the air, and said "Fight! Fight! Fight!", prompting AfD politician Alice Weidel to repeat the phrase and gesture.

=== Domestic ===
U.S. president Joe Biden commenting on the assassination attempt, July 13

On July 14, Biden gave an address condemning political violence, including the attempted assassination of Trump, arguing for the need to "lower the temperature" in American politics.

After the shooting, President Biden said: "Look, there's no place in America for this kind of violence. It's sick. It's sick. It's one of the reasons we have to unite this country... Everybody must condemn it." In a separate statement, he said he was grateful that Trump was safe. Biden also publicly expressed his condolences for Comperatore, hailing his actions as a father. Biden and Trump spoke on the evening of the incident. On July 14, Biden ordered an independent security review of Trump's rally and warned against political violence in an Oval Office address.

Republican House Speaker Mike Johnson pledged to open an investigation into the shooting, seeking testimony from federal law enforcement and national security officials. Senate Republicans urged the Democratic-controlled Senate to conduct hearings as well.

Republican U.S. Representative Mike Collins argued that Biden "sent the orders" on Twitter, referencing something Biden said during a conversation with other Democrats: "I have one job, and that's to beat Donald Trump... It's time to put Trump in a bullseye." Reuters wrote that "many of [Trump's] supporters began laying blame on Democrats, seeking to flip the script on who has stoked America's heated political rhetoric as cases of political violence reach historic heights", including Texas representative Keith Self, who argued that his language had incited violence. Biden later apologized for the remark, saying "It was a mistake to use the word. I didn't say crosshairs. I meant bullseye, I meant focus on [Trump]. Focus on what he's doing."

Republican Senator JD Vance—later Trump's running mate—blamed the Biden campaign's political rhetoric, while Republican Senator Tim Scott blamed messaging by "the radical left and corporate media". Republican House Majority Leader Steve Scalise, who was seriously injured in the 2017 congressional baseball shooting, said that Democratic leaders had been fueling "ludicrous hysteria" about Trump and called for the "incendiary rhetoric" to stop. Republican Representative Marjorie Taylor Greene criticized Democratic Representative Bennie Thompson for having introduced a bill that would strip Secret Service protection from convicted felons, including Trump. Jacqueline Marsaw—a member of Thompson's staff—was fired after a social media post that read "I don't condone violence but please get you some shooting lessons so you don't miss next time oops that wasn't me saying that". Steven Woodrow, a Democratic member of the Colorado House of Representatives, posted on Twitter in response to the assassination attempt: "The last thing America needed was sympathy for the devil but here we are." His post was widely criticized, including by the Colorado Democratic Party; Woodrow deleted his account about three hours after his post. Afterward, he told the Washington Examiner that he condemned the shooting "on the strongest terms".

Pennsylvania Governor Josh Shapiro denounced political violence and ordered flags to be lowered to half-staff in honor of Comperatore. Colorado Governor Jared Polis called for Biden to extend Secret Service protection to independent presidential candidate Robert F. Kennedy Jr. Requests for protection by the Secret Service of independent presidential candidates are considered on an as-needed basis. Biden directed the Secret Service to do so on July 15.

Former president George W. Bush called the shooting "cowardly" and applauded the Secret Service's response. Former presidents Barack Obama and Bill Clinton and former secretary of state Hillary Clinton, who was Trump's opponent in the 2016 presidential election, also condemned the attack and wished Trump a swift recovery. Former House Speaker Nancy Pelosi, whose husband Paul Pelosi was severely assaulted, said, "As one whose family has been the victim of political violence, I know firsthand that political violence of any kind has no place in our society". Mike Pence, who served as Vice President of the United States during Trump's first presidency and launched a rival bid to Trump in the 2024 Republican presidential primaries, released a statement saying, "Karen and I thank God that President Trump is safe and recovering following yesterday's attempted assassination" and praising the Secret Service for its quick response, which Pence said "undoubtedly saved lives", adding, "There is no place in America for political violence and it must be universally condemned." Former U.S. Representative Gabby Giffords, who was seriously injured in the 2011 Tucson shooting, said "Political violence is terrifying. I know. I'm holding former President Trump, and all those affected by today's indefensible act of violence in my heart. Political violence is un-American and is never acceptable—never." The Carter Center, founded by former president Jimmy Carter, condemned the attack and called for Americans to "embrace civility". John Hinckley Jr., who attempted to assassinate Ronald Reagan in 1981, said "violence is not the way to go".

Mark Webb, a bishop of the Global Methodist Church—the Christian denomination of which Comperatore was a member—called the assassination attempt a "senseless act of violence and hatred" and implored all to "comfort those who mourn and boldly offer the promise of resurrection and new life through Jesus Christ".

The National Council of Churches condemned the assassination attempt, along with "toxic polarization, hate rhetoric, and the demonization and denigration of those who hold different opinions". Archbishop Timothy Broglio, president of the United States Conference of Catholic Bishops, issued a statement condemning the shooting as political violence, emphasizing that it is never a solution to political disagreements.

=== International ===
Many heads of state and of government, as well as of international organizations, condemned the shooting and expressed good wishes to Trump.

Prime Minister of Canada Justin Trudeau issued a statement on social media that he was sickened by the attack, adding, "my thoughts are with former President Trump, those at the event, and all Americans." Trudeau spoke to Trump on the phone after the attack. United Kingdom Prime Minister Keir Starmer condemned the shooting, saying he was appalled by it and that political violence has "no place in our society". Buckingham Palace confirmed on July 15 that King Charles III wrote to Trump after the assassination attempt. First Minister of Scotland John Swinney also condemned the incident. On July 14, Palestinian president Mahmoud Abbas sent a letter to Trump, which Trump posted on his social media site.

Prime Minister Narendra Modi of India strongly condemned the incident, saying, "violence has no place in politics and democracies" and wishing Trump a speedy recovery. Prime Minister Anthony Albanese of Australia condemned the shooting, saying there was "no place for violence in the democratic process" and added that he was relieved to hear Trump was safe. Prime Minister Christopher Luxon of New Zealand said he was shocked to hear of what had occurred, adding that "no country should encounter such political violence".

Chancellor Olaf Scholz of Germany condemned the shooting as an "attack on democracy", describing the attack on Trump as despicable and wishing the former president a quick recovery. Other European leaders to condemn the shooting included Viktor Orbán of Hungary, Simon Harris of Ireland, Giorgia Meloni of Italy, Luc Frieden of Luxembourg and Volodymyr Zelenskyy of Ukraine. President Recep Tayyip Erdoğan of Turkey held a telephone conversation with Trump and praised his "bravery". Prime Minister Benjamin Netanyahu of Israel released a video condemning the shooting and said it was an attack on democratic institutions everywhere.

NATO Secretary General Jens Stoltenberg expressed shock at the shooting, condemning the attack on Trump, and wishing the former president a speedy recovery. António Guterres, Secretary-General of the United Nations, was confirmed by a UN spokesperson to have unequivocally condemned the attack, describing it as an act of political violence. The President of the European Commission Ursula von der Leyen issued a statement saying that she was "deeply shocked" by the events at the rally, and offered condolences to the family of the deceased audience member, Corey Comperatore.

Dmitry Peskov, the press secretary of Russian president Vladimir Putin, condemned the event, adding that the shooting took place in an atmosphere created by Biden's leadership, in the context of what he argued to be attempts to remove Trump from the political arena. Cuba blamed the U.S. arms industry and increased political violence in America. Georgian Prime Minister Irakli Kobakhidze and other Georgian government officials blamed the attack on the "Global War Party", a recurring conspiracy theory of the Georgian Dream party alleging a mysterious international organization that exerts influence on the Western world from the shadows.

=== Online ===
The event garnered a large amount of commentary from Internet users. There was much activity on Twitter. Tweets about the event gained millions of views in the first hour; "Trump" was the top trending topic, with over 228,000 posts; one livestream had hundreds of thousands of people in its audience. Posts, pictures, and videos related to the event were seen not only from accounts users were following, but also appeared prominently in users' algorithmic "for you" feeds. While much larger audiences posted on Twitter, the event was also discussed on 4chan, TikTok, Reddit, and Meta-owned Instagram and Threads. Similar bursts of activity happened on pro-Trump website patriots.win and Telegram, on the latter of which some far-right groups carried out a "pattern of mass deletion of posts ... in case it was one of their own".

Topics of discourse (on both the left and right wings) involved details of the security setup, who was to blame for the attack, what kind of weapon the shooter used, and whether language used by politicians and the media had "inflamed tensions" and played a role in motivating the attack. The Atlantic described posters as "trying to make their own order amid intense disorder". A very large number of claims made in the period immediately after the attack were unverified or conjectural, including multiple failed attempts to identify the attacker. Many turned out to be false, while others were jokes or deliberate hoaxes.

Some people (including left-wing users, right-wing users, and bots) suggested or claimed online that the attack had been staged as a false flag, and the words "Trump" and "staged" were briefly the two highest-trending topics immediately after the attack. No evidence emerged to support this. Some false claims that gained significant circulation derived from early media reports, superseded by later reports, including the claim that Trump was hit by a glass fragment flying at him from a teleprompter purportedly shattered by a bullet; the teleprompters were actually intact after the shooting.

A hashtag comparing the assassination attempt to the Reichstag fire during Adolf Hitler's rise to power in Germany trended on social media. Bruce Bartlett, an official in the Ronald Reagan and George H. W. Bush administrations, also made the comparison.

=== Entertainment ===
In the wake of the assassination attempt, MSNBC and Comedy Central preempted the Monday broadcasts of Morning Joe and The Daily Show, respectively, with MSNBC continuing to air breaking news coverage of the assassination attempt and Comedy Central canceling its plans to host the Republican National Convention from Milwaukee. Both shows returned to air on July 16.

Channel 4 in the United Kingdom pulled The Simpsons season 7 episode "Lisa the Iconoclast" from its air in the wake of the shooting, possibly due to a scene in which a sniper points a gun at a speaker during a rally or the fact that the episode depicts a (fictional) assassination attempt on George Washington.

After the shooting, the American TV series The Boys changed the title of its season four finale, which aired on July 18, from "Assassination Run" to "Season Four Finale". A "viewer discretion advised" warning was added at the beginning, with Amazon, Sony Pictures Television, and the producers of The Boys opposing political violence and writing, "any scene or plotline similarities to these real-world events are coincidental and unintentional".

Jack Black canceled the world tour of his comedy band Tenacious D on July 16 after bandmate Kyle Gass joked onstage about the assassination attempt. Black later said on Instagram that he "would never condone hate speech or encourage political violence in any form". Gass apologized on Instagram, saying his joke was "highly inappropriate, dangerous and a terrible mistake", but deleted the post two days later.

=== Proposed historical marker ===
A proposed gift of a historical marker to the Connoquenessing Township was offered by the Jewish American Society for Historic Preservation to historically interpret the assassination attempt. The Connoquenessing Township Board of Supervisors declined the offer unanimously.

== Misinformation and conspiracy theories ==
Misinformation, disinformation, and conspiracy theories about the assassination attempt quickly spread on social media, gaining popularity within minutes of the shooting. Public opinion polls show that over half of Americans believe that Crooks did not act alone. MIT misinformation expert Adam Berinsky said the fast spread of such theories online reflected the extensive political division in the United States, and author Colin Dickey said the spread was due to the nation's "long love affair with conspiracy theories of all kinds". BBC News disinformation and social media correspondent Marianna Spring said, "the real change... is how this kind of lingo is being widely used by the average social media users" rather than being on the fringe, adding that many of the "most-viral" false posts "came from left-leaning users who regularly share their anti-Trump views". The Associated Press called the two competing conspiracy theories established online—that the shooting was either staged by Trump or orchestrated by Biden—"one for each end of America's polarized political spectrum".

Claims were made that the incident was planned by Democrats, staged by Republicans, planned by BlackRock, or planned by the FBI.

=== Planned by Democrats ===
Many right-wing conspiracy theories circulated on social media. "Antifa" became a trending topic after posts on Twitter blamed the shooting on a "prominent Antifa activist", while other posts claimed the perpetrator was Jewish and/or transgender. A photo of an unrelated transgender woman was claimed on social media to be of Crooks. CBS News wrote that users on Twitter alleged that "Secret Service resources were diverted from Trump's rally", an unsubstantiated claim denied by a spokesperson and echoed by Elon Musk, as part of the "baseless theory" that the agency is part of "a conspiracy to get rid of the former president". Many Trump supporters claimed the event was a deep state plot to prevent Trump's re-election. Several antisemitic conspiracy theories have also been reported.

Marjorie Taylor Greene, citing Biden's "bullseye" comment, said, "Democrats wanted this to happen", and U.S. Representative Mike Collins falsely said that Biden "sent the orders". According to The New York Times, the claim that Biden orchestrated the shooting was "perhaps the most dominant" conspiracy theory. The Institute for Strategic Dialogue called this part of a "massive online spread of false claims". Biden later apologized for the remark, saying "It was a mistake to use the word. I didn't say crosshairs. I meant bullseye, I meant focus on [Trump]. Focus on what he's doing."

=== Staged by Republicans ===
Within minutes of the shooting, the word "staged" became the second-highest trending topic on Twitter, generating about 600 million views with the help of bot accounts. Left-wing users posted conspiracy theories of a false flag operation, dubbed "BlueAnon", in reference to QAnon. False claims included that the shooting and blood on Trump were faked; that crisis actors were used; that Corey Comperatore was a "'sacrifice' to make the attempt look more realistic"; that the shooting was intended to improve Trump's chance of winning the election; and, according to a Democratic strategist, that Republicans staged the shooting to improve Trump's image. The Washington Post journalist Taylor Lorenz wrote, "As more Americans lose trust in mainstream institutions and turn to partisan commentators and influencers for information, experts say they are seeing a big uptick in the manufacture and spread of left-wing conspiracy theories, a sign that the communal warping of reality is no longer occurring primarily on the right." A Morning Consult poll two days after the shooting found that one in five Americans found it credible that the shooting was staged, including a third of Biden voters.

=== Planned by BlackRock ===
BlackRock is the world's largest asset manager. In the days after the shooting, a conspiracy theory centered on BlackRock, and was propagated by cryptocurrency promoters, as a continuation of previous conspiracy narratives involving the company. This was spurred by the fact that in 2022 Crooks had appeared in a BlackRock advertisement that was filmed at his high school. In less than a day, a tweet revealing Crooks's appearance in the ad was viewed more than 17 million times. The company then deleted the video. The conspiracy theory that some people had foreknowledge is based on behavior on July 12, 2024, the day before the assassination attempt, when the investment company Austin Private Wealth filed a report with the Securities and Exchange Commission indicating that it had shorted 12 million shares of Trump Media & Technology Group (ticker symbol DJT), thus betting that the stock's price would decrease. Four days later, the filing was amended to 1,200 shares, and the company apologized for what it called a "filing error".

=== Planned by the FBI ===
Conspiracies claiming the FBI was involved in the assassination attempt circulated on social media after the shooting. In November 2025, though the FBI had claimed Crooks had no online footprint, independent investigators uncovered some of Crooks's social media. Former Secret Service special agent Richard Staropoli told Fox News he believed that the assassination attempt, as well as the one in Florida two months later, might have been planned by authorities. Staropoli said he found the lack of public information about Crooks "suspicious", saying, "Why was [Crooks's] body burned so quickly? Where's the level of investigation that should've been done?" He added, "The only reason there was an investigation to begin with was because it reached public attention. Otherwise, I'd say nothing would have been done." U.S. Representative Mike Kelly accused the FBI of withholding files and ignoring security warnings before the rally. Representative Pat Fallon said the FBI never shared files related to Crooks with members of Congress who were investigating the assassination attempt. Fallon later called for a new investigation in light of any new information. Conservative commentator Tucker Carlson said he believed that FBI director Kash Patel was purposely avoiding questions about Crooks.

== See also ==
- 2024 United States presidential election in Pennsylvania
- 2026 White House Correspondents' Dinner shooting
- Assassination of Charlie Kirk
- List of mass shootings in the United States in 2024
- Political violence in the United States
- Security incidents involving Donald Trump
