= Zico (footballer, born 1954) =

Brazilian footballer (born 1954)

Personal information
- Full name: José Aparecido Rodrigues
- Date of birth: 9 November 1954 (age 71)
- Place of birth: Andirá, Paraná, Brazil
- Position: Goalkeeper

Senior career*
Years	Team	Apps	(Gls)
1974	Matsubara		
1975–1977	9 de Julho (CP)		
1978	Marcílio Dias		
1979–1982	Cascavel EC		
1983	Colorado-PR		
1983	Pinheiros-PR		
1984	Comercial-MS		
1984–1985	Pinheiros-PR		
1986	Cascavel EC		
1986–1987	CSA		
1987	ASA		
1988–1989	Grêmio Maringá		
1990	Campo Mourão		
- * Club domestic league appearances and goals as of 17 September 2025

José Aparecido Rodrigues (born 9 November 1954), better known as Zico, is a Brazilian former professional footballer who played as a goalkeeper.

== Career ==
A native of Paraná, Zico spent most of his career with teams from the state. He gained notoriety both in 1980, when he scored a goal from his own goal area against Colorado's Joel Mendes, and in 1983 in a Brazilian Championship match, when he failed to return from halftime against Botafogo FR, arriving on the field in a race after passed 40 seconds of the start of second half.

== Honours ==
Cascavel EC

- Campeonato Paranaense: 1980
