= Doug Mills (photographer) =

American photographer (born 1960)

Doug Mills (born 1960) is an American photographer who has covered the White House since 1983. He began working for The New York Times in 2002, having previously been the chief photographer for The Associated Press in Washington, in which capacity he won two Pulitzer prizes for team coverage. As of February 2019, he is a board member of the White House Correspondents' Association. In 2025, Mills won a third Pulitzer, in Breaking News Photography, for his photographs of the attempted assassination of Donald Trump in 2024.

== Early life ==
Mills was born in Greensboro, North Carolina, in 1960. Mills grew up in Arlington County, Virginia, where he attended Fairlington and Oak Ridge Elementary School. His interest in photography began while attending Gunston Middle School, after being signed into a daily three-hour program at Arlington Career Center. In his teenage years, Mills worked as a waste collector in Fairlington Villages and as a Drug Fair employee. Mills graduated Wakefield High School, where he had served as a sports photographer, also taking photos of swimmers of the Overlee Swimming Association for the Alexandria Journal.

== Career ==
Mills studied photography at Northern Virginia Community College, working for a newspaper in Virginia. While attending college, Mills became a freelance photographer for United Press International, after showing his portfolio to a UPI photographer, who was holding a public speaking event. A few years later, Mills was hired by the Associated Press and during his 15 years of employment there, Mills became chief photographer. He joined The New York Times in 2002, working at their Washington, D.C. bureau.

In 1993, he won a Pulitzer Prize for photography for covering the Bill Clinton 1992 presidential campaign. He won a second Pulitzer Prize for AP's coverage of the Clinton–Lewinsky scandal. It has been reported that Mills was the first photographer—in 2001—to use a remote camera to photograph presidents. In 2015, Mills was inducted into the Hall of Fame of his former high school.

Mills won multiple awards at the "2021 Eyes of History Still Contest" of The White House News Photographers Association. His awards included Photographer of the Year and Political Photo of the Year (for a photo of then U.S. President Donald Trump leaving Air Force One during a lightning storm). Trump called Mills the "No. 1 photographer in the world." Of the seven U.S. presidents Mills covered, he considered Barack Obama the most "photogenic" and Trump the most "iconic."

In 2022, Mills covered his 16th Olympic Games.

All of a sudden, there was what I thought were three or four loud pops. At first I thought it was a car. The last thing I thought was it was a gun.

I kept taking pictures. He went down behind the lectern, and I thought, "Oh my God, something's happened."

I've never been in a more horrific scene. As much as I've covered presidents for 35 to 40 years, it's not something I ever wanted to witness.

— Doug Mills, 'A Times Photographer Who Was Feet Away From Trump Describes the Shooting', The New York Times, the 14th of July, 2024

On July 13, 2024, Mills took a world-famous (Note: Multiple references:) photograph during the assassination attempt of Trump, capturing one of the bullets whizzing millimetres away from his head. The New York Times article's expert considered the photo as 'a one in a million shot and nearly impossible to catch even if one knew the bullet was coming'.

== Personal life ==
Mills lives in Cherrydale, Virginia. He is married to Kate, who is director of Audio Services for C-SPAN. As of May 2025, the couple have three children, two daughters and one son.
