= Salena Zito =

American journalist and author

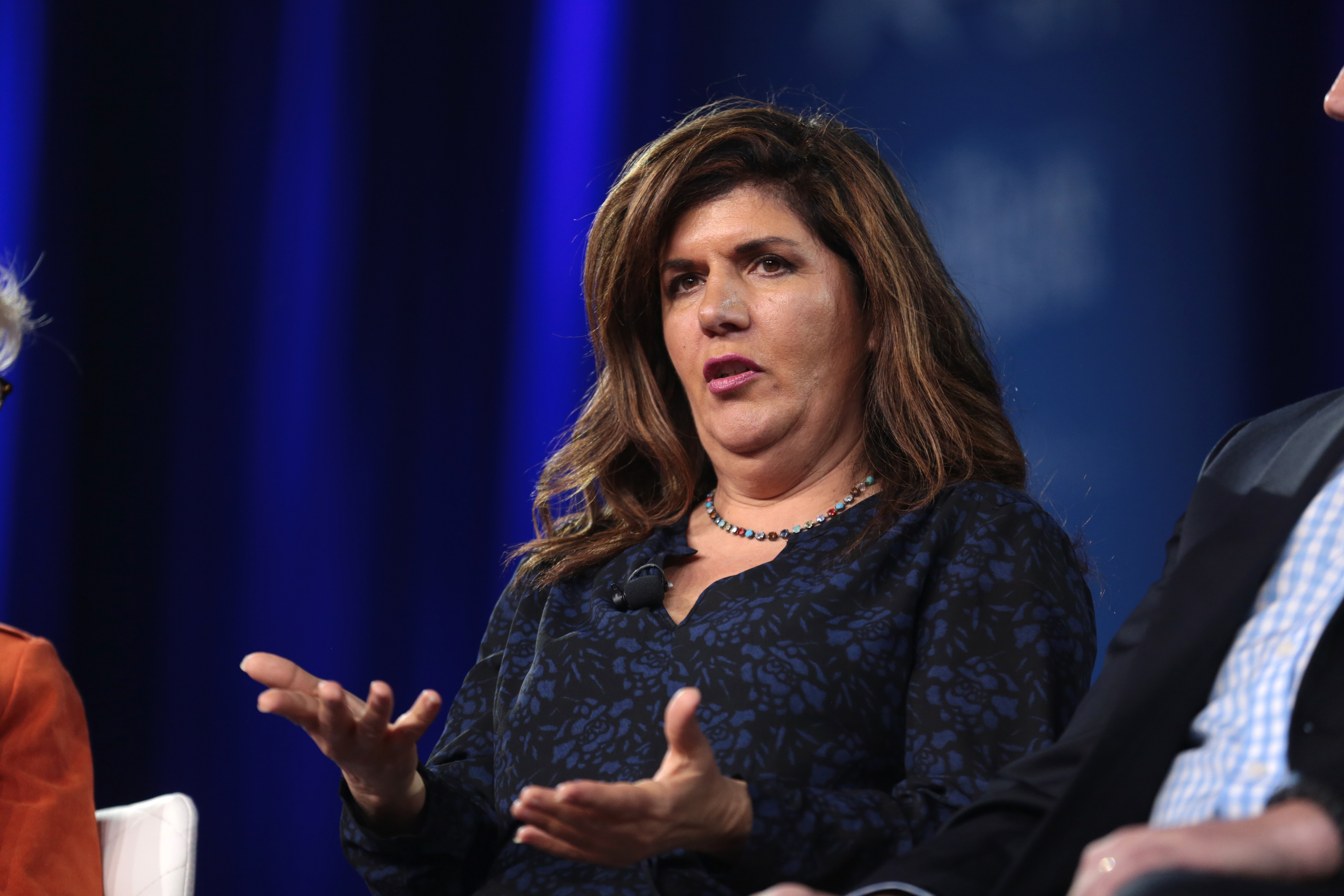
Zito at the Conservative Political Action Conference in 2017

Salena Zito is a Pennsylvania-born American political journalist and author who is a reporter for the Washington Examiner and a contributor to The Washington Post. She was previously a columnist for the Pittsburgh Tribune-Review and the New York Post and a CNN contributor.

Other reporters have frequently accused Zito of misrepresenting Republican Party officials as swing voters and of fabricating quotes in her reporting. On at least three occasions, Zito has plagiarized content from other writers, including Wikipedia.

Donald Trump praised The Great Revolt (2018), which she co-authored with Brad Todd. Zito's 2025 book about the attempted assassination of Donald Trump in Pennsylvania, Butler, debuted at #1 on The New York Times Best Seller list, and Zito sold the movie rights to Pensé Productions.

== Awards ==
In 2024, Zito received the Media Research Center Bulldog Award.

== Books ==
- Zito, Salena; Todd, Brad (2018). The Great Revolt: Inside the Populist Coalition Reshaping American Politics. Crown Forum. ISBN 978-1-5247-6368-8.
- Zito, Salena (2021). It's Complicated: How Our Nation Is Coming Together and Falling Apart. Creators Publishing. ISBN 978-1949673364.
- Zito, Salena (2025). Butler: The Untold Story of the Near Assassination of Donald Trump and the Fight for America's Heartland. Center Street. ISBN 978-1546009146.
