= Donald Trump raised-fist photographs =

2024 images of Donald Trump after shooting

Attempted assassination of Donald Trump in Pennsylvania
- The most famous and most distributed of the pictures, taken by Evan Vucci of the Associated Press on July 13, 2024, during an attempted assassination of Donald Trump

- Location within Pennsylvania
- Date: July 13, 2024; 2 years ago
- Time: 6:11 p.m. EDT (UTC−04:00)
- Venue: Butler Farm Show grounds
- Location: Butler, Pennsylvania; 40.857°N 79.971°W
- Type: Assassination attempt, political violence, mass shooting
- Theme: presidential assassination attempts
- Cause: AR-15-style rifle fire
- Motive: Under investigation
- Target: Donald Trump
- Perpetrator: Thomas Matthew Crooks
- Organised by: Donald Trump 2024 presidential campaign
- Outcome: Target injured; perpetrator killed; security failure leading to political fallout and resignations
- Deaths: 3 (including the perpetrator)
- Injuries: 2
- Inquiries: House Task Force on the Attempted Assassination of Donald Trump, Secret Service internal review, FBI investigation

On July 13, 2024, photojournalists covering a political rally near Butler, Pennsylvania captured numerous photographs of Donald Trump — then a former president of the United States and the presumptive nominee of the Republican Party in the 2024 presidential election — in the immediate aftermath of an assassination attempt. These photographs, many showing Trump with blood on his face and with a raised fist, were published worldwide alongside news of the assassination attempt and shared widely on social media. The photographs themselves, and the stories of the photographers who took them, received substantial press coverage.

The composition of photos taken by Evan Vucci for the Associated Press, featuring an American flag framed prominently behind Trump as he raised his fist, was praised by commentators who compared it to several iconic historical images and predicted that it would come to represent Trump and his 2024 election victory. Trump used this photo for fundraising and the sale of merchandise.

Photographs taken by other photographers covering the campaign event were also widely shared. A sequence of photographs taken by Doug Mills for The New York Times, including one showing a bullet whizzing past Trump's head, received the 2025 Pulitzer Prize in breaking news photography.

== Background ==
Donald Trump, then a former president of the United States who was the presumptive nominee of the Republican Party in the 2024 United States presidential election, held a rally for his presidential campaign near Butler, Pennsylvania, on July 13, 2024. Shortly after the rally began, Thomas Matthew Crooks opened fire at Trump in an assassination attempt; Trump survived, though his ear was injured by a bullet, bloodying his face.

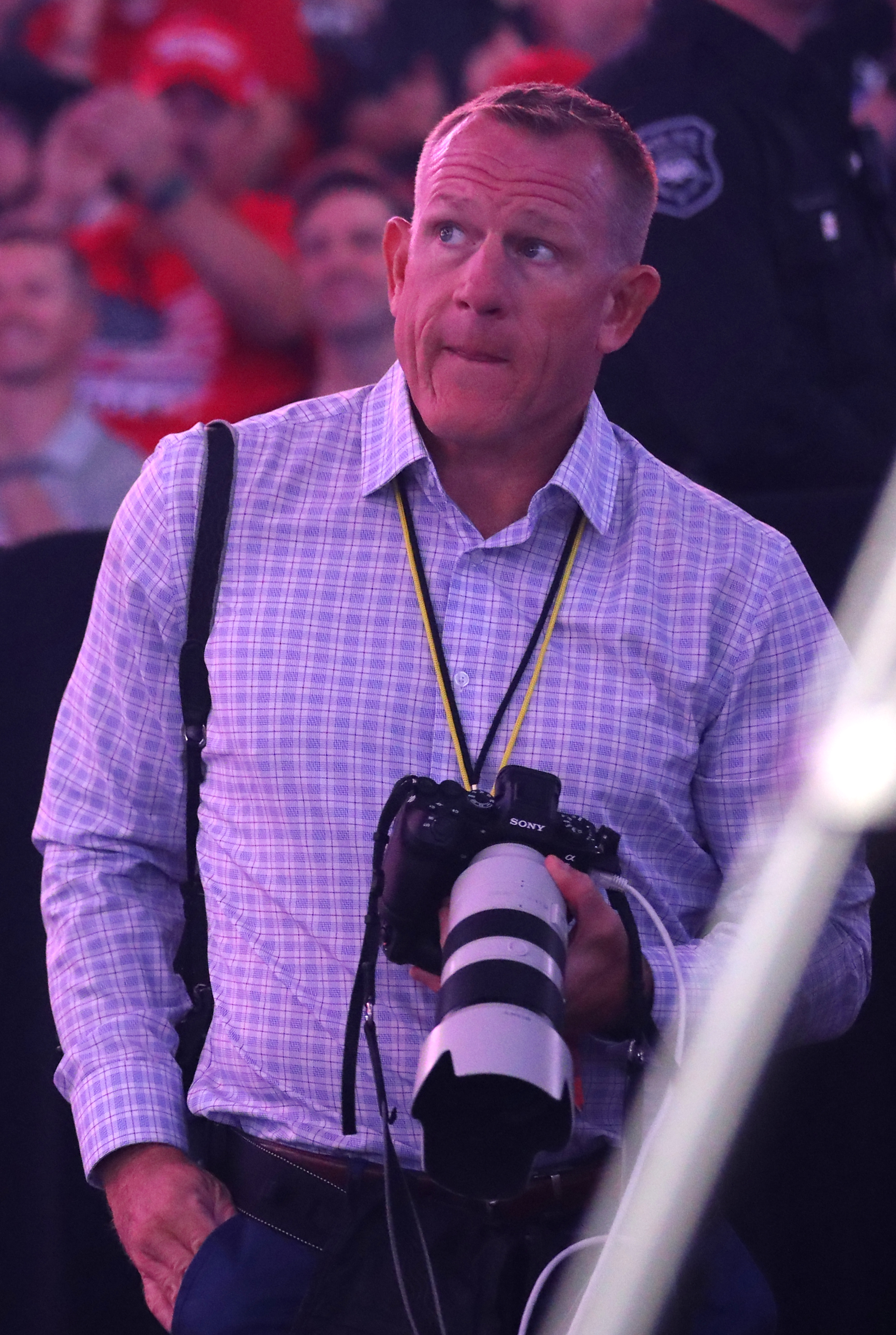
Photographer Evan Vucci in August 2024

Evan Vucci, the chief photojournalist of the Associated Press (AP) in Washington, D.C., was one of four photographers stationed in a buffer area near the stage where Trump spoke during the rally. Vucci had covered Trump since 2015 and had photographed hundreds of political rallies. He previously covered the War in Afghanistan and the Iraq War, and he took a well-known 2008 photograph of an Iraqi journalist throwing his shoes at then-U.S. president George W. Bush. In 2021, he won the Pulitzer Prize for Breaking News Photography as part of an AP team covering the George Floyd protests.

After shots began to be fired at the rally, Vucci saw United States Secret Service agents in Trump's security detail rush towards the former president, so he ran to find a better vantage point and began photographing. He later recounted that he "knew right away" that it was an attempt to assassinate Trump, and that "it was a moment in American history and it had to be documented". Vucci further recounted:

It was a situation where that vast experience absolutely does [prepare you]. To have that experience behind you sort of allows you to remain calm. ... In my head, I just kept saying to myself, 'slow down, slow down. Compose, compose.' Okay, what's gonna happen next? What's going on here? What's going on there? Just trying to get every angle on it.

== Composition ==
Evan Vucci's photographs show Trump moments after he stood up after being shot in the ear during an assassination attempt. His right fist is raised into the air in defiance and blood is streaked across his face. He is surrounded by Secret Service agents on his security detail, one of whom, Sean M. Curran, stares at the camera. A large flag of the United States waves in the background of the photos, in front of a clear blue sky. Trump holds a red MAGA hat that reads "Make America Great Again"—his signature slogan—in his left hand. In some of Vucci's photographs, Trump's mouth is open as he either mouths or shouts "Fight!"; in other photos, Trump's lips are pursed.

In The Conversation, Sara Oscar described numerous elements she said made Vucci's work "such a powerful image": The agents form[ing] a triangular composition that places Trump at the vertex; ... The agent draw[ing] us into the image, he looks back at us, he sees the photographer and therefore, he seems to see us; ... Set against a blue sky, everything else in the image is red, white and navy blue. The trickles of blood falling down Trump's face are echoed in the red stripes of the American flag which aligns with the republican red of the podium."

Philip Kennicott, writing for The Washington Post, described Vucci's photographs as "Densely packed with markers of nationalism and authority" such as "the flag, the blood, the urgent faces of federal agents in dark suits". He described one of the closed-mouth photos as "strongly constructed, with aggressive angles that reflect the chaos and drama of the moment, and a powerful balance of color, all red, white and blue, including the azure sky above and the red-and-white decorative banner below. Trump seems to emerge from within a deconstructed version of its basic colors."

== Related photographs ==
Other photographers in the press gallery also took photos of Trump during the assassination attempt.

A photograph by Doug Mills of The New York Times showed a bullet streaking past Trump's head. Mills, who had photographed American presidents since 1983, initially thought the noise was that of a car before he noticed that Trump had been shot. He continued to take pictures using a Sony camera capable of taking 30 pictures per second. Mills had captured a picture of Trump pumping his fist, though he also sent to his editor photographs taken of Trump speaking before the shooting. She saw what appeared to be a bullet behind Trump's head in one of the photographs, which was later confirmed by a forensic analysis. In May 2025, Mills was awarded the Pulitzer Prize for Breaking News Photography for his photographs of the assassination attempt on Trump, including this bullet photograph.

Anna Moneymaker, a photographer for Getty Images, captured a photo of Trump on the ground with blood trickling over his face immediately after the shooting, underneath Secret Service agents who were on top of him. Other photographers who captured photos in the aftermath of the shooting included Gene J. Puskar for the Associated Press, Doug Mills for The New York Times, Brendan McDermid for Reuters, Rebecca Droke for Agence France-Presse, and Jabin Botsford for The Washington Post.

== Reception and impact ==
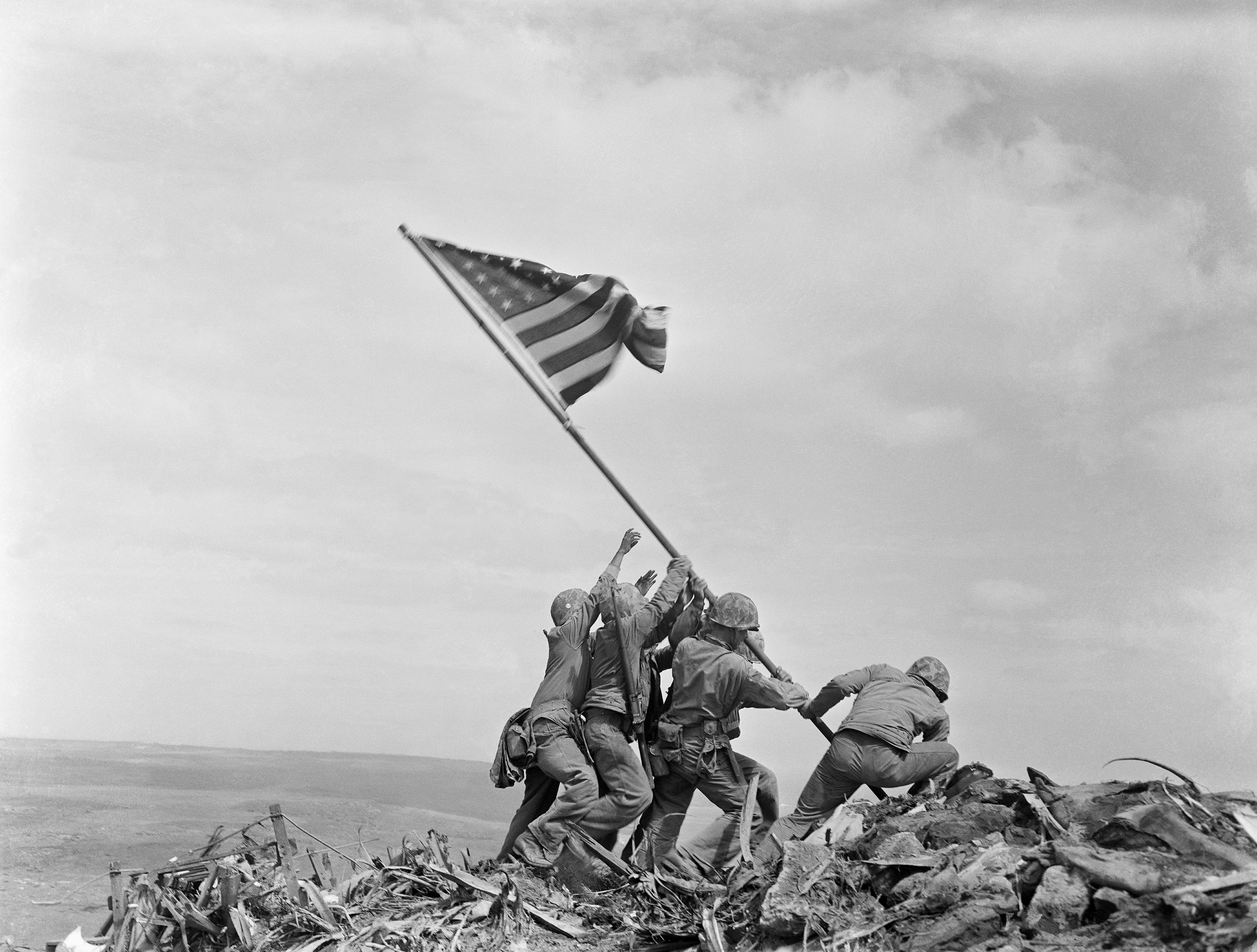
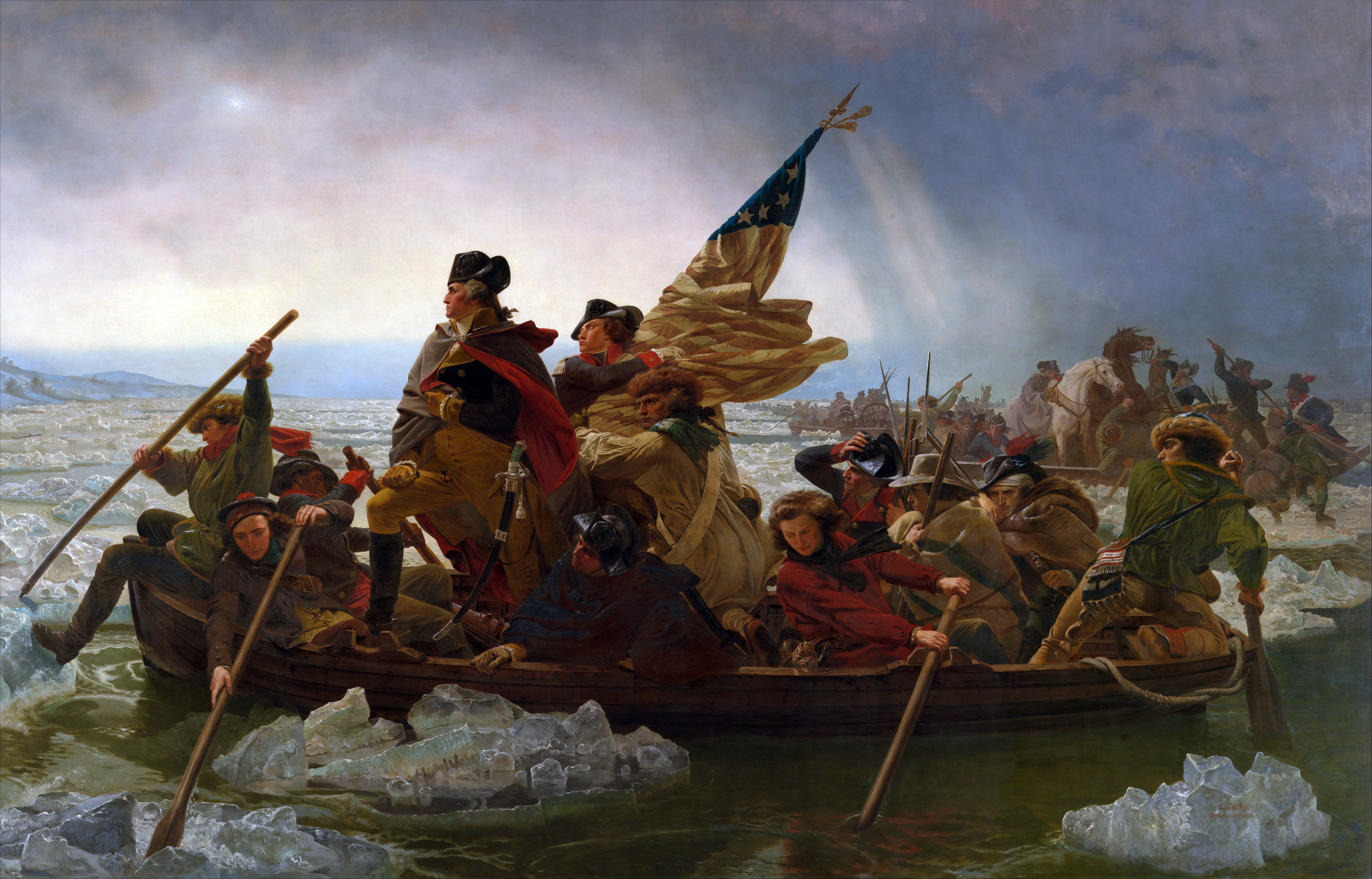
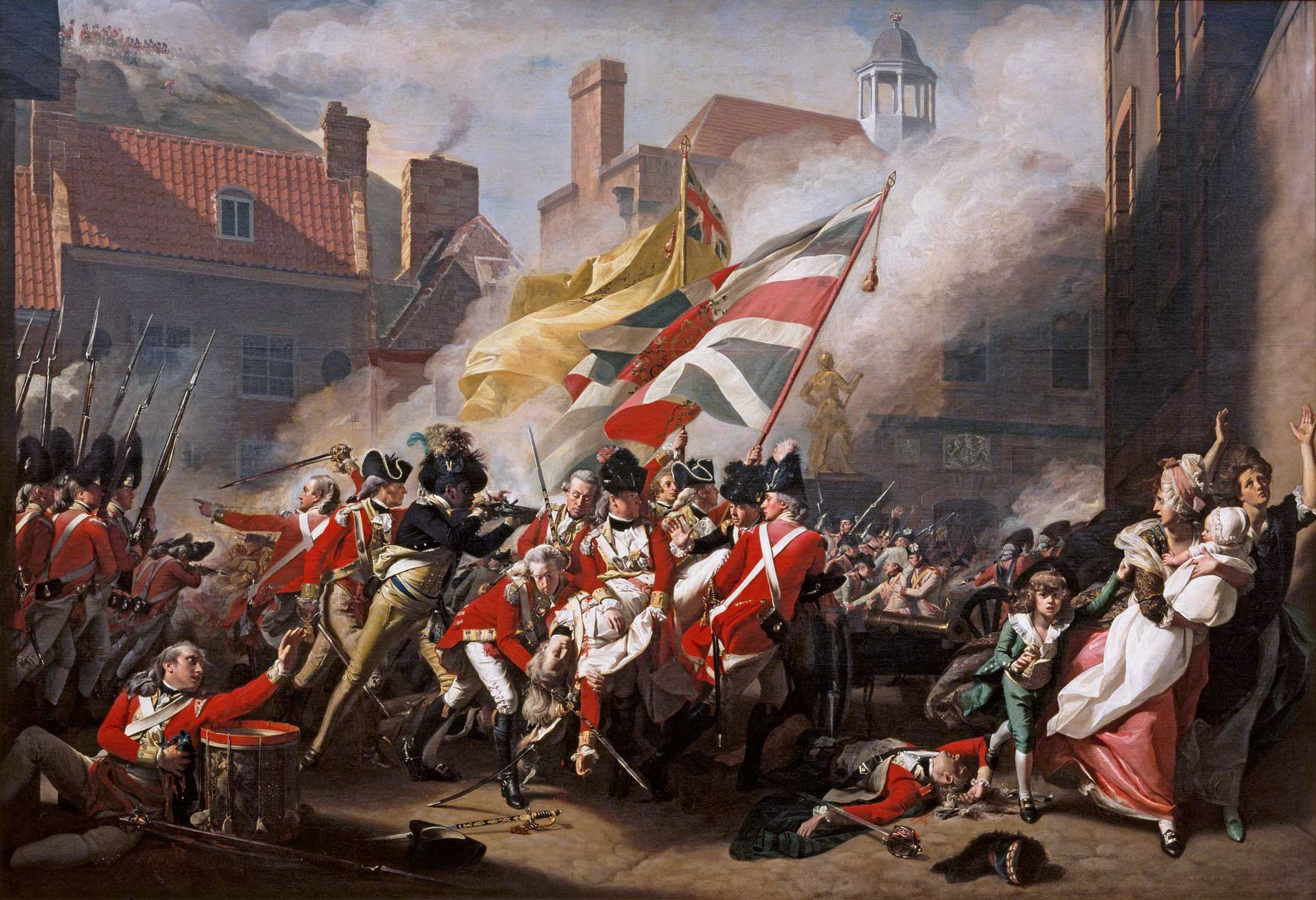
The photographs have been compared to the photo Raising the Flag on Iwo Jima and historical patriotic paintings, including Washington Crossing the Delaware, Liberty Leading the People and The Death of Major Peirson.

The photographs of Trump were quickly shared widely on the internet, circulated by Republicans and Trump's allies and appeared in internet memes. The photos appeared on the front pages of newspapers across the United States, United Kingdom, and Australia. Two days after the assassination attempt, Vucci's photos were called "already iconic"; Patrick Witty, a former photo editor at Time, The New York Times, and National Geographic, said "Without question, Evan's photo will become the definitive photo from the [assassination] attempt" because it "captures a range of complex details and emotions in one still image". AP customers used two of the photos 4,100 times the day after the shooting, compared to 700–800 times for a typical week's most-used photo.

Many compared the photographs of Trump to historical patriotic images, most prominently Raising the Flag on Iwo Jima, a 1945 photograph by Joe Rosenthal of U.S. Marines raising the American flag during World War II. The New York Times art and culture critic Jason Farago said that Trump's raised fist suggested "fearlessness and indomitability". He compared photos of the assassination attempt by Vucci, Mills, Moneymaker, and a Reuters photographer to historical paintings: Liberty Leading the People (1830) of the July Revolution in France by Eugène Delacroix; and The Death of Major Peirson (1783), by John Singleton Copley during the Anglo-French War.

The photographs were taken as proof, by some, of Trump's strong media instinct, turning a moment of crisis into a display of strength. On July 14, the day after the assassination attempt, Trump told The New York Post: "A lot of people say it's the most iconic photo they've ever seen. They're right and I didn't die. Usually you have to die to have an iconic picture." Trump's presidential campaign used images of the assassination attempt to solicit donations. In The Daily Telegraph, Roland Oliphant wrote that Trump "could not have looked more like an American hero if he tried", calling Vucci's photos "a product of world-class photojournalism—and also, perhaps, of Trump's innate political instincts."

The press gallery photographers were commended for their bravery in running towards the stage to take the photos after shots were fired. Axios writer Aïda Amer said that notable images by Vucci, Moneymaker, and Mills quickly became known in newsrooms as the "Evan photo", "Anna photo", and "the bullet photo", respectively. Amer also reported that "Multiple photographers worried privately that the images from the rally could turn into a kind of 'photoganda'" for Trump's campaign, and that one told her it was "dangerous" for the media to continue using the Vucci photo "despite how good it is", because it was "free P.R. for Trump" that made him a "martyr".

In Deutsche Welle, Carla Bleiker called one of Vucci's photographs an "image for the history books", describing it as a "declaration of defiance in the face of adversity" and noting the cultural importance of the U.S. flag in the image, especially for conservative Americans. Fraser Nelson of The Spectator wrote that "[any critic] would have instantly recognised" Vucci's photos as "a once-in-a-generation photograph—an image that will become one of the most potent in American politics and history" and "be remembered as one of the most important political photographs ever taken." He called Vucci's work photojournalism at its most powerful". In The Atlantic, Tyler Austin Harper said Vucci's photos "became immediately legendary", and that "However you feel about the man at its center, it is undeniably one of the great compositions in U.S. photographic history." He said that it was not "an exaggeration to say that the photo is nearly perfect, one captured under extreme duress and that distills the essence of a man in all his contradictions."

Jonathan Jones, an art critic writing for The Guardian, compared the photographs to "timeless patriotic images" including Raising the Flag on Iwo Jima and Washington Crossing the Delaware (1851) by Emanuel Leutze. Drawing similarities to religious works, including Descent from the Cross (c. 1435) and The Entombment of Christ (1603–1604), he wrote: "There is something genuinely uncanny, not quite explicable, about this image: how a scene with such deep meanings and a positively religious suggestiveness can happen spontaneously." Philipp Kennicott said the pictures "could change America forever", predicting that it would encourage further political violence by "creat[ing] a reality more real than reality, transforming the chaos and messiness of a few moments of peril onstage in Pennsylvania into a surpassing icon of Trump's courage, resolve and heroism." Timothy Garton Ash wrote that the photograph would "change the course of history of the world", and commentators suggested it could help Trump win the 2024 election.

British journalist Piers Morgan wrote that Vucci's work was "Already one of the most iconic photographs in American history". Many other journalists expressed similar sentiments; The Washington Post writer Jeremy Barr also said Vucci's photos were "sure to go down in the pantheon of American photography", while Geordie Gray wrote in The Australian that the photos were "destined to become one of the defining images of our time". Writing for The New Yorker, Benjamin Wallace-Wells said the pictures were "already the indelible image of our era of political crisis and conflict." Discussing how the photographs depicted Trump, he concluded: "It is an image that captures him as he would like to be seen, so perfectly, in fact, that it may outlast all the rest."

=== Monetization by Trump and third parties ===
Within hours of the shooting, the Trump campaign website began using a black and white raised-fist photograph to direct visitors to the Republican Party's fundraising website. Trump put Vucci's raised-fist photograph on the cover of a book that was already scheduled to be released the following month, and, within days of the shooting, licensed and promoted high-top sneakers with his bloodied face and the words "Fight Fight Fight".

Also within a few hours of the shooting, online influencers and right-wing political commentators such as Candace Owens and Sebastian Gorka began selling T-shirts featuring photos of the shooting as well as the word "fight".

=== Tributes ===
In January 2025, American sculptor Alan Cottrill unveiled Don Colossus, a 15-foot (4.6-meter) bronze statue of Trump modeled after Vucci's raised-fist photograph. It was commissioned in August 2024 by the $PATRIOT cryptocurrency group, who paid Cottrill around $400,000, and was said to be intended to "tour the country" before being permanently placed at the future Donald J. Trump Presidential Library. In April 2026, the statue was put on display at the Trump National Doral golf course.

During Trump's second presidency, Marc Lipp created a canvas painting based on Vucci's photograph; the painting was donated to the White House by Andrew Pollack. In April 2025, it was hung in the Grand Foyer of the State Floor of the White House, displacing former president Barack Obama's portrait which was moved onto the opposite wall to replace one depicting former president George W. Bush. Bush's portrait was moved to a nearby staircase, next to one of his father George H. W. Bush. White House press secretary Karoline Leavitt said Trump had decided to "temporarily" display the painting.

== Legacy ==
Trump went on to win the U.S. presidential election in November 2024; after his victory, The New York Times said that the "images of him bleeding after a failed assassination attempt became the symbol of what supporters saw as a campaign of destiny." CNN wrote that the image "became an emblem of strength" in Trump's presidential campaign. During Trump's presidential campaign, the photographs of him were featured on T-shirts, mugs, and other merchandise. In December 2024, The Guardian named Vucci's photograph of Trump after the assassination attempt one of the "photographs that defined 2024". Regarding the legacy of his photographs, Vucci said:

My job is to show you the world through my eyes. I try to do it professionally, fairly, and I feel like I did that in the moment. The reaction to the photograph afterwards is out of my control. As far as people saying that photograph won Trump the election, I would have to push back on that. I think people have very real problems and very real issues, and I feel that for someone to vote based on a photograph is ridiculous.

== See also ==
- Public image of Donald Trump
- List of photographs considered the most important
