= Zeto (Greek) =

Greek linguistic interjection

Zeto (Greek: ζήτω, ancient pronunciation: zḗtō; modern pronunciation: zī́to) is an interjection used in the Greek language. Zeto is the third person, singular imperative form of the verb "to live" (ζῆν in Ancient Greek, ζην in Modern Greek). It expresses a hope on the part of the speaker that another should live, roughly translating into "may he/she/it live" though it is used in the same sense as "long live" in English and "vive, viva, and vivat" in the Romance languages. For example, «Ζήτω η Ελλάς!» means "Long live Hellas!" while «Ζήτω το Σύνταγμα», a popular chant of the 3 September 1843 Revolution, means "Long live the Constitution!"
