= Zito =

Zito may refer to:

- Zito (surname)
- Žito (fl. 14th century), Bohemian court magician
- Zito (footballer, born 1932) (1932–2015), born José Ely de Miranda, Brazilian football midfielder
- Zito (footballer, born 1971), born Helmer da Piedade Rosa, Angolan football midfielder
- Zito Luvumbo (footballer, born 2002), Angolan football winger
- Zito, Tibet, Tibetan town
- Zito, singular form of ziti
