= James Benjamin Parker =

Intervenor in President McKinley's assassination (1857–1907)

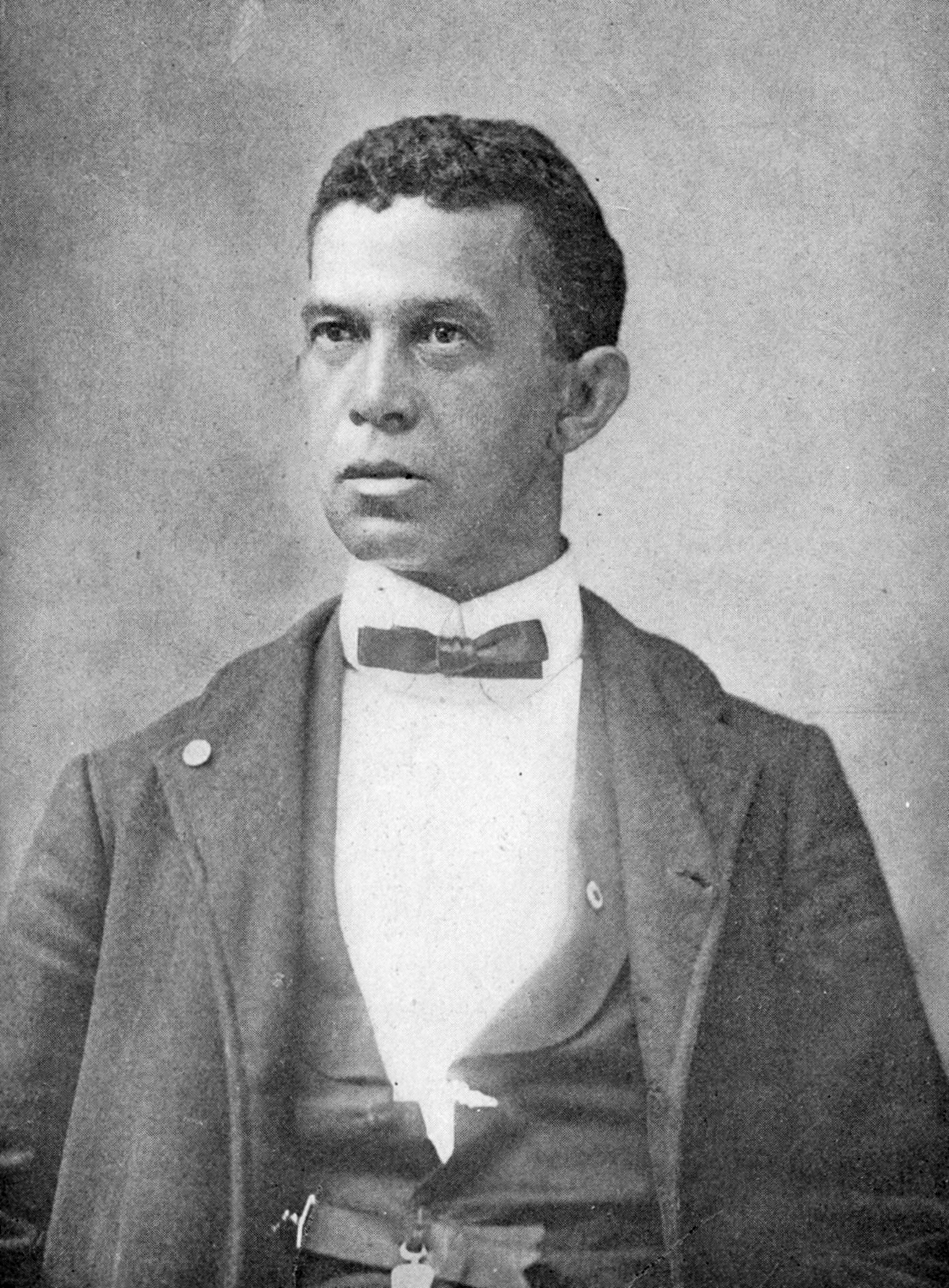
- Parker in 1901
- Born: July 31, 1857; Atlanta, Georgia, U.S.
- Died: April 13, 1907 (aged 49); Philadelphia, Pennsylvania, U.S.
- Occupations: Newspaper salesman, constable, mail carrier, caterer, traveling salesman
- Known for: Intervening in the shooting of William McKinley

James Benjamin Parker (July 31, 1857 – April 13, 1907) was an African-American man best known for apprehending Leon Czolgosz after Czolgosz shot President William McKinley on September 6, 1901. After Czolgosz fired two shots from a concealed gun, Parker knocked him down before a third shot could be fired. Parker was initially applauded for his actions, though some witnesses minimized or omitted his role because of his race. After McKinley's assassination, Parker drifted around the United States before being committed to Philadelphia State Hospital at Byberry, where he died.

== Early life ==
James Benjamin Parker was born to enslaved parents on July 31, 1857, in Atlanta, Georgia. He worked various jobs, including as a newspaper salesman for the Southern Recorder and as a constable. He moved to Chicago, Illinois, where he was employed as a waiter, before returning to Atlanta, where he appears in city directories as a mail carrier for the United States Postal Service. He then moved to Saratoga, New York; New York City; and Buffalo, New York, where he took a job with a catering company at the Pan-American Exposition's Plaza Restaurant.

== McKinley assassination ==
=== Background ===
Parker had been laid off from his job at the Plaza Restaurant before September 6, 1901, and used that day to visit the Exposition's Hall of Music, where President William McKinley was receiving members of the public.

The recent assassinations of European leaders by anarchists, and often virulent denouncements of McKinley in the newspapers of William Randolph Hearst, made McKinley's private secretary George B. Cortelyou concerned that there might be an attempt on the president's life. Cortelyou arranged for tight security after McKinley twice refused to cancel his appearance. A contingent of up to 75 City of Buffalo police and exposition security guards monitored the doors to the Hall of Music and patrolled the queue waiting to see the president. Persons who made it far enough to approach McKinley finally had to pass through a cordon of U.S. Army soldiers who had been instructed to quickly surround anyone who appeared suspicious. Since the Spanish–American War, the United States Secret Service had been protecting McKinley, and two special agents, backed by several Buffalo police detectives, stood near the president.

=== Shooting ===
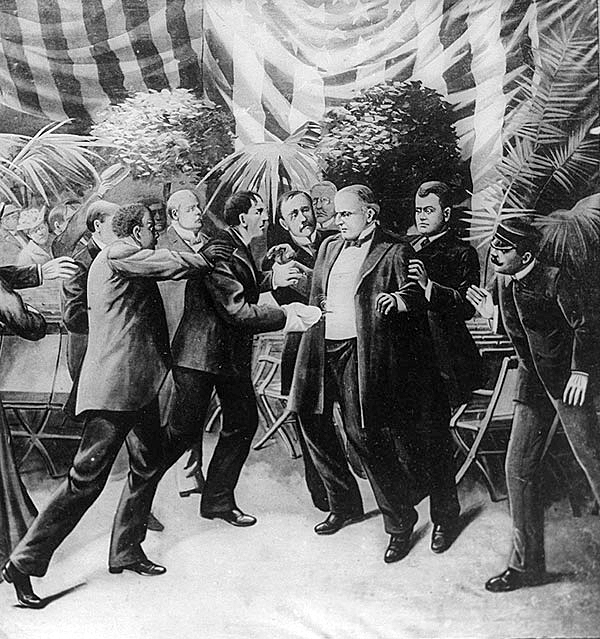
Parker, left, grabs Czolgosz in a drawing by T. Dart Walker depicting the shooting.

There was a general rule that anyone approaching the president must do so with their hands open and empty. But the heat of the day meant this custom was not being enforced, as many people were carrying handkerchiefs with which to wipe away perspiration. A long line of exposition attendees queued to meet the president. Leon Czolgosz, in front of Parker in the queue, used the heat to conceal a pistol underneath a handkerchief. As McKinley extended his hand, Czolgosz shot him in the abdomen twice at point blank range. The first bullet ricocheted off a coat button and lodged in McKinley's jacket. The second pierced his stomach. As onlookers gazed in horror, and as McKinley lurched forward a step, Czolgosz prepared to take a third shot but was prevented from doing so when Parker slammed into him, knocking the gun out of his hand. As Parker tackled Czolgosz, he was joined by Buffalo detective John Geary and artilleryman Francis O'Brien; they succeeded in restraining Czolgosz, who was badly pummeled by more soldiers, police, and bystanders before McKinley could order the beating to stop.

According to a later account by United States Secret Service special agent Samuel Ireland, Parker punched Czolgosz in the neck, then tackled him to the ground. An unnamed witness cited in a Los Angeles Times story said that "with one quick shift of his clenched fist, he knocked the pistol from the assassin's hand. With another, he spun the man around like a top and with a third, he broke Czolgosz's nose. A fourth split the assassin's lip and knocked out several teeth."

In Parker's own account, given in a newspaper interview a few days later, he said:

I heard the shots. I did what every citizen of this country should have done. I am told that I broke his nose—I wish it had been his neck. I am sorry I did not see him four seconds before. I don't say that I would have thrown myself before the bullets. But I do say that the life of the head of this country is worth more than that of an ordinary citizen and I should have caught the bullets in my body rather than the President should get them.

In an interview with the New York Journal, Parker said, "just think, Father Abe freed me, and now I saved his successor from death, provided that bullet he got into the president don't kill him."

=== Aftermath ===
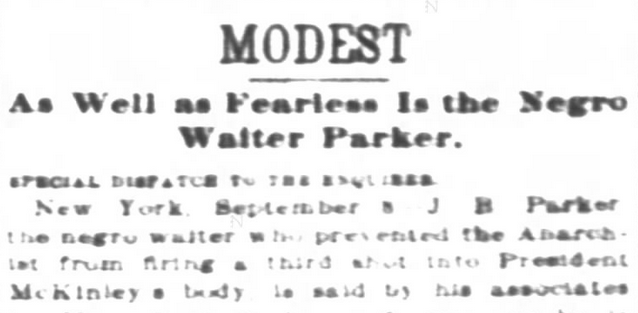
The headline of a story on Parker that ran in the Cincinnati Enquirer following the assassination: "Modest as Well as Fearless is the Negro Waiter Parker"

After the shooting, Parker was praised in both black and white press stories for saving McKinley's life; the Washington Evening Star published the first photograph of him on September 11. It described him as six feet four inches tall, "peaceful", "law-abiding", but known for bravery, and noted that a public fund had been organized in Washington for his benefit. Parker received awards for his efforts. He was even inducted into the Don't Knock Society, an all-white fraternal organization. He received several commercial offers, including one from a company that wanted to sell his photograph. He refused, saying in an interview: "I do not think that the American people would like me to make capital out of the unfortunate circumstances. I am glad that I was able to be of service to the country." Before McKinley died, when his outlook for recovery appeared promising, the Savannah Tribune, an African-American newspaper, wrote of Parker: "the life of our chief magistrate was saved by a Negro. No other class of citizens is more loyal to this country than the Negro."

McKinley died about a week later of complications arising from his wound. Czolgosz was tried and convicted in Erie County Superior Court and executed on October 29, his body then dissolved in acid. Parker was not called to testify. Booker T. Washington later lauded his attempt to save McKinley in a speech. Preacher Lena Doolin Mason wrote a poem praising Parker's actions, "A Negro In It", casting him as the latest in a long line of African Americans who risked their lives in service to their country and admonishing white Americans to recognize that bravery with the cessation of lynchings.

=== Controversy ===
Parker was never called to testify at Czolgosz's trial. He was accused by Secret Service members of making false claims. On September 27, he encountered Black supporters who supported his claims but he refused to publicly address the crowd. Clarence Lusane wrote in The Black History of the White House that before the shooting, Parker was being racially profiled by a secret service agent. Parker was described as indignant at others' attempts to take credit for Czolgosz's capture.

== Later life and death ==
After the McKinley assassination, Parker left Buffalo, and after spending the Christmas holidays with his family in Atlanta, traveled through the United States giving lectures to enthusiastic crowds at such places as Nashville, Tennessee, Long Branch, New Jersey, Brooklyn, New York, and Pittsburgh, Pennsylvania. On September 6, 1902, the first anniversary of the shooting, Parker was the principal speaker at a memorial service at the People's AME Zion Church in Providence, Rhode Island. Although there was talk of Parker being appointed as a messenger to the United States Senate, nothing seems to have come of it, and he subsequently worked as a traveling salesman for the New York City based Gazetteer and Guide, an African-American interest magazine written for Pullman Porters and railroad and hotel employees. Details of his later activities were, for many years, unknown.

Later research found that in early 1907, Parker was in Atlantic City, New Jersey, where he had been "roaming about as a vagrant for some time". He was arrested by local police and confined as a "lunatic". "Friends" appeared to help Parker, who was released to their custody. They made their way to Philadelphia, Pennsylvania, where Parker was placed in a boardinghouse at 246 South 9th Street.

Parker later wrote to McKinley's widow, Ida, asking for help. Ida, who was grateful to Parker, sent the letter to George Cortelyou and Parker was given permanent employment as a messenger at the United States Capitol and a house in Washington, D.C.. On March 24, 1907, a policeman noticed Parker on a West Philadelphia street "acting queerly" and took him into custody. In the station house, Parker "raved all night". The next morning, a police surgeon examined him and determined that "his mind was subject to hallucinations and that it was dangerous for him to be at large". Parker was therefore admitted to Philadelphia State Hospital at Byberry. He died at 2:10 pm on April 13, 1907, with the cause given as myocarditis and nephritis as a contributory cause. As his body was not claimed for burial, it was sent to the "Anatomical Board", where it was eventually dissected by students of the Jefferson Medical College.

== Legacy ==
African Americans mourned McKinley's death but were proud of Parker's heroic actions and viewed his treatment as an injustice. Some experts have noted that Parker's efforts prevented Czolgosz from firing a third shot at McKinley, and by doing so, gave McKinley enough time not only for him to prepare for his condition worsening over the week but for his family and friends to spend those last days with him and say their goodbyes.

In 2023, a painting of Parker was unveiled at McKinley Vocational High School by Reverend William Cobb Jr.

=== Portrayals in media ===
- Parker's actions are dramatized in Murder at the Fair (2006), an episode of the History Channel miniseries 10 Days That Unexpectedly Changed America.
- In season 7, episode 15, of the CBC Television period drama series Murdoch Mysteries, "The Spy Who Came Up to the Cold" (2014), a scene depicting McKinley's shooting has Parker beating Czolgosz.

== See also ==
- Charles Burleigh Purvis, African-American physician who attended President James Garfield
