= Lena Doolin Mason =

American poet

- Born: May 6, 1864; Quincy, Illinois
- Died: August 28, 1924 (aged 60); Philadelphia, Pennsylvania
- Education: Douglass High School
- Occupation: Ministry
- Years active: 1887–1924
- Known for: Colored Conference

Lena Doolin Mason (May 6, 1864 – August 28, 1924) was an American Methodist preacher and poet.

== Biography ==
White man, stop lynching and burning
This black race trying to thin it
For if you go to heaven or hell
You will find some Negroes in it.

— Lena Doolin Mason

Lena Doolin was born on May 6, 1864, in Quincy, Illinois, to Vaughn and Relda Doolin. She joined the congregation of Hannibal, Missouri's African Methodist Episcopal Church in 1872. She attended Douglass High School in Hannibal and Professor Knott's School in Chicago. In 1883, she married George Mason. Their daughter was the only one of their six children to survive to adulthood. When she was 23, Mason entered the ministry, preaching exclusively to white people for her first three years.

Mason was a noted orator. During her career, she was a member of the Colored Conference and preached in "nearly every state in the Union."

Mason also wrote songs and composed poetry. Only two of her poems are extant, "A Negro in It," written to praise James Parker for his efforts in intervening in the assassination of William McKinley, and "The Negro in Education." For the latter poem, she subverted the standard pro-slavery argument that education makes people unfit to be slaves.
