= Assassination of William McKinley =

1901 murder in Buffalo, New York, US

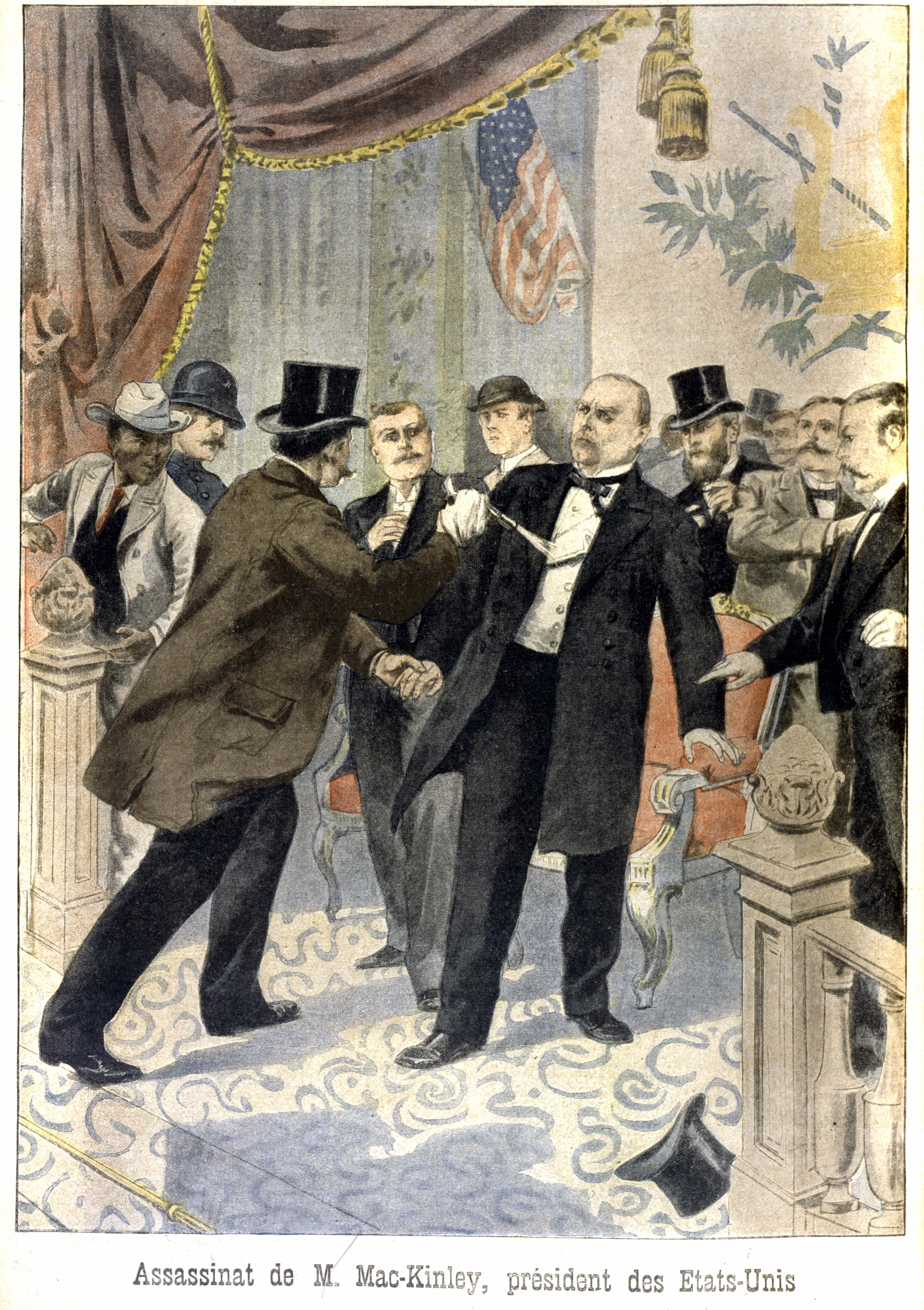
- Leon Czolgosz shoots President McKinley with a revolver concealed under a rag.
- Location: 42°56′19″N 78°52′25″W; Temple of Music on the grounds of the Pan-American Exposition in Buffalo, New York, U.S.
- Date: September 6, 1901; 125 years ago 4:07 p.m.
- Target: William McKinley
- Weapon: .32 caliber Iver Johnson revolver
- Deaths: 1 (McKinley; died on September 14, 1901 as a result of initial injury and subsequent infection)
- Perpetrator: Leon Czolgosz
- Motive: To advance anarchism
- Verdict: Guilty
- Convictions: First degree murder
- Sentence: Death

William McKinley, the 25th president of the United States, was shot on the grounds of the Pan-American Exposition in the Temple of Music in Buffalo, New York, on September 6, 1901, six months into his second term. He was shaking hands with the public when an anarchist, Leon Czolgosz, shot him twice in the abdomen. McKinley died on September 14 of gangrene caused by the wounds. He was the third American president to be assassinated, following Abraham Lincoln in 1865 and James A. Garfield in 1881.

McKinley enjoyed meeting the public and was reluctant to accept the security available to his office. Secretary to the President George B. Cortelyou feared that an assassination attempt would take place during a visit to the Temple of Music and took it off the schedule twice, but McKinley restored it each time.

Czolgosz had lost his job during the economic Panic of 1893 and turned to anarchism, a political philosophy adhered to by contemporary assassins of foreign leaders. He regarded McKinley as a symbol of oppression and was convinced that it was his duty as an anarchist to kill him. He was unable to get near the president during an earlier visit, but he shot him twice as McKinley reached to shake his hand in the reception line at the temple. One bullet grazed McKinley; the other entered his abdomen and was never found.

McKinley initially appeared to be recovering, but his condition deteriorated on September 13 as his wounds became gangrenous. He died at 2:15 am on September 14 and was succeeded by his vice president, Theodore Roosevelt. A month later, Czolgosz was convicted of first degree murder and was sentenced to death. He was executed by the electric chair on October 29. Congress later passed legislation to officially charge the Secret Service with the responsibility for protecting the president.

== Background ==
In September 1901, William McKinley was at the height of his power as president. Elected in 1896, during the serious economic depression resulting from the Panic of 1893, he had defeated his Democratic rival, William Jennings Bryan. McKinley led the nation both to a return to prosperity and to victory in the Spanish–American War in 1898, taking possession of such Spanish colonies as Puerto Rico, Guam and the Philippines in emulation of the era's overseas imperialism. Re-elected handily in a rematch against Bryan in 1900, according to historian Eric Rauchway, "it looked as if the McKinley Administration would continue peaceably unbroken for another four years, a government devoted to prosperity".

McKinley's original vice president, Garret Hobart, had died in 1899, and McKinley left the choice of a running mate to the 1900 Republican National Convention. In advance of the convention, New York's Republican political boss, Senator Thomas C. Platt, saw an opportunity to politically sideline his state's governor, Theodore Roosevelt, by pushing for his nomination as vice president. Roosevelt accepted the nomination and was elected on McKinley's ticket.

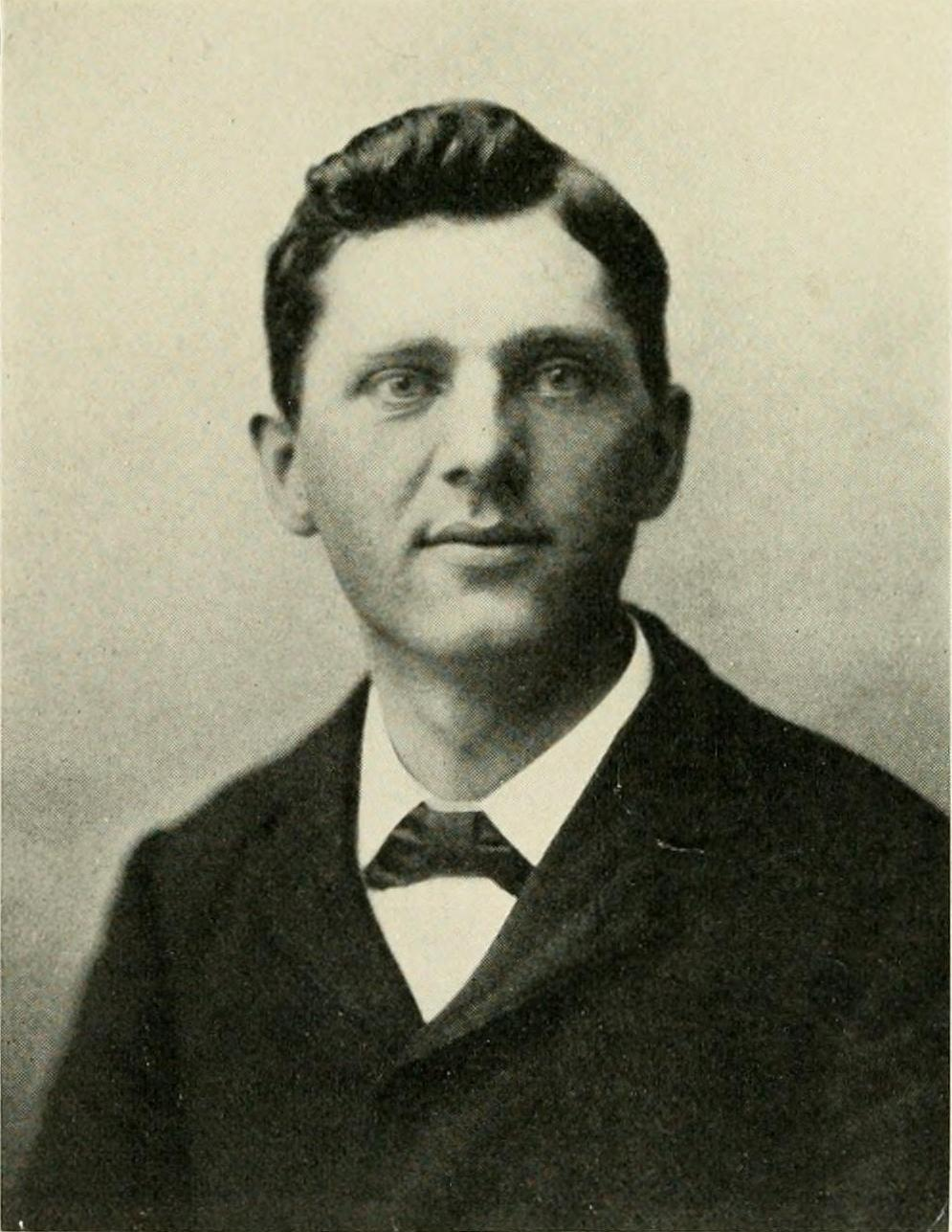
Leon Czolgosz, McKinley's assassin

Leon Czolgosz was born in Detroit, Michigan, in 1873, the son of Polish immigrants. The Czolgosz family moved several times as Paul Czolgosz, Leon's father, sought work throughout the Midwest. As an adult, Leon Czolgosz worked in a Cleveland factory until he lost his job in a labor dispute in 1893. Thereafter, he worked irregularly and attended political and religious meetings, trying to understand the reasons for the economic turmoil of the Panic of 1893. In doing so, he became interested in anarchism. By 1901, this movement was feared in the United States – New York's highest court had ruled that the act of identifying oneself as an anarchist in front of an audience was a breach of the peace. In Europe, anarchists had assassinated or attempted to assassinate a half-dozen officials and members of royal houses, and had been blamed for the 1886 Haymarket bombing in Chicago.

Two American presidents had been assassinated in the 19th century: Abraham Lincoln in 1865 and James A. Garfield in 1881. Even considering this history, McKinley did not like security personnel to come between him and the people. When in his hometown, Canton, Ohio, he often walked to church or the business district without protection, and in Washington he went on drives with his wife without a guard in the carriage.

== Presidential visit ==
=== Plans and arrivals ===
McKinley gave a short speech at his second inauguration on March 4, 1901. Having long been an advocate of protective tariffs, and believing the Dingley Tariff, passed during his first year in office, had helped the nation reach prosperity, McKinley planned to negotiate reciprocal trade agreements with other countries. This would open foreign markets to American manufacturers that had dominated the domestic market thanks to the tariff, and who sought to expand. During a long trip planned for the months after his inauguration, he intended to make major speeches promoting this plan, culminating in a visit and address at the Pan-American Exposition in Buffalo on June 13.

McKinley, his wife Ida, and their official party left Washington on April 29 for a tour of the nation by train, scheduled to conclude in Buffalo for a speech on what had been designated as "President's Day". He met with rapturous receptions in the Far West, where many had never before seen a president. In California, the first lady became seriously ill, and for a time was thought to be dying. She recovered in San Francisco, but her husband canceled the remainder of the tour and the McKinleys returned to Washington. The speech at the Exposition was postponed until September 5, after McKinley spent some weeks in Washington and two months in Canton. He used his time in his Ohio home working on the Buffalo speech and in supervising improvements to his house. He intended to remain based in Canton until October.

Czolgosz had lived on his parents' farm near Cleveland beginning in 1898, working little – he may have suffered a nervous breakdown. He is known to have attended a speech by anarchist Emma Goldman in May 1901 in Cleveland: he approached her before the speech and asked her to recommend books on anarchism; she obliged. The talk, in which Goldman did not advocate violence but expressed understanding for those driven to it, was a great influence on Czolgosz; he later stated that her words burned in his head. He came to see her at her Chicago home in July as she was about to depart on a trip to Buffalo to see the fair, and the two anarchists rode together to the train station. Goldman expressed concern to another radical that Czolgosz (who was using the alias Fred Nieman) was following her around; soon after, he apparently departed Chicago. William Arntz, a worker at a park in Canton, stated that he had seen a man resembling Czolgosz in mid-1901, when the president was staying at home and sometimes visiting the park. The man was wearing two guns, and when Arntz reminded him that firearms were not permitted outside the park's shooting range, responded dismissively. Arntz sought the police, but the man was never found.

Later in the summer, Czolgosz moved to Buffalo for unknown reasons. Author and journalist Scott Miller speculated that he may have chosen Buffalo because of its large Polish population. He boarded in the suburb of West Seneca and spent much of his time reading. Czolgosz then left for Cleveland, though what he did there is uncertain; he may have picked up anarchist literature or procured more money. Then Czolgosz went to Chicago, where he saw a newspaper mention of McKinley's impending visit to Buffalo. He returned to Buffalo, as yet uncertain of what he would do; at first, he only sought to be near the man who to him embodied injustice. On Tuesday, September 3, he made up his mind. Czolgosz later stated to the police:

It was in my heart, there was no escape for me. I could not have conquered it had my life been at stake. There were thousands of people in town on Tuesday. I heard it was President's Day. All those people seemed bowing to the great ruler. I made up my mind to kill that ruler.

On September 3, Czolgosz went to Walbridge's Hardware Store on Buffalo's Main Street and purchased a .32-caliber Iver Johnson revolver. He had as yet no clear plan for the assassination. The following day, William and Ida McKinley arrived in Buffalo by train. The cannon that fired a salute to the president on his arrival in the city had been set too close to the track and blew out several windows in the train, unnerving the first lady. About a dozen people on the platform, believing the damage was caused by a bomb, shouted "Anarchists!" As William McKinley stepped down from the train to the official welcome, Czolgosz shoved his way forward in the crowd, but found the president too well guarded to make an attempt on his life.

=== A day at the fair; excursion to Niagara Falls ===
McKinley's trip to Buffalo was part of a planned ten-day absence from Canton, beginning on September 4, which was to include a visit in Cleveland to an encampment of the Grand Army of the Republic; he was a member as a Union veteran. The McKinleys stayed in Buffalo at the Milburn House, the large home of the Exposition's president, John G. Milburn. On Saturday, September 7, they were to travel to Cleveland and stay first at the home of businessman and future Ohio governor Myron Herrick, a friend of the president, and then with McKinley's close friend and adviser, Ohio Senator Mark Hanna. Upon arrival in Buffalo, the presidential party was driven through the fairgrounds on the way to the Milburn House, pausing for a moment at the Triumphal Bridge at the Exposition so the visitors could look upon the fair's attractions.

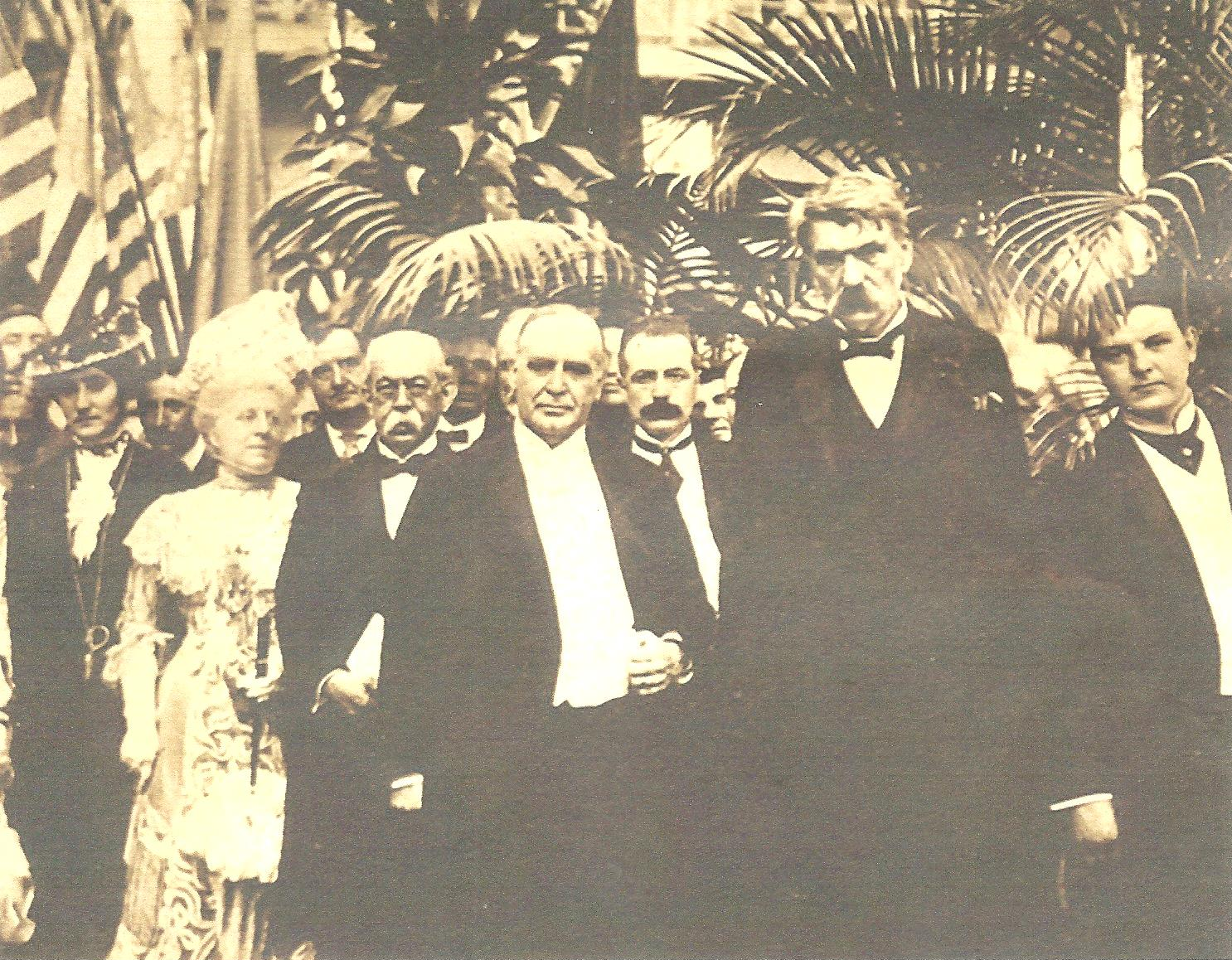
The "last posed photograph" of President McKinley, taken in the Government Building on September 5, the day before his assassination. Left to right: Mrs. John Miller Horton, chairwoman of the Entertainment Committee of the Woman's Board of Managers; John G. Milburn; Manuel de Azpíroz, the Mexican ambassador; the president; George B. Cortelyou, the president's secretary; Col. John H. Bingham of the Government Board.

While in Buffalo, McKinley had two days of events. On Thursday, September 5, he was to deliver his address and then tour the fair. The following day, he was to visit Niagara Falls, and, on his return to Buffalo, meet the public at the Temple of Music on the Exposition grounds. Part of the reason for bringing McKinley repeatedly to the fair was to swell the gate receipts; the popular president's visit was heavily advertised. The public reception at the Temple of Music was disliked by his personal secretary, George B. Cortelyou, who, concerned for the president's security, twice tried to remove it from the program. McKinley restored it each time; he wished to support the fair (he agreed with its theme of hemispheric cooperation), enjoyed meeting people, and was not afraid of potential assassins. When Cortelyou asked McKinley a final time to cancel the event, the president responded, "Why should I? No one would wish to hurt me." Cortelyou warned McKinley that many would be disappointed since the president would not have time to shake hands with all who would line up to meet him. McKinley responded, "Well, they'll know I tried, anyhow." Unable to persuade the president to alter his schedule, Cortelyou telegraphed authorities in Buffalo, asking them to arrange extra security.

On Thursday morning, the fair gates were opened at 6:00 a.m. to allow the crowds to enter early and seek good spots to witness the president's speech. The Esplanade, the large space near the Triumphal Bridge where the president was to speak, was filled; the crowd overflowed into the nearby Court of the Fountains. Of the 116,000 fairgoers that day, about 50,000 are believed to have attended McKinley's speech. The route between the Milburn House and the site of the speech was packed with spectators; McKinley's progress by carriage to the fair with his wife was accompanied by loud cheering. He ascended to a stand overlooking the Esplanade, and after a brief introduction by Milburn, began to speak.

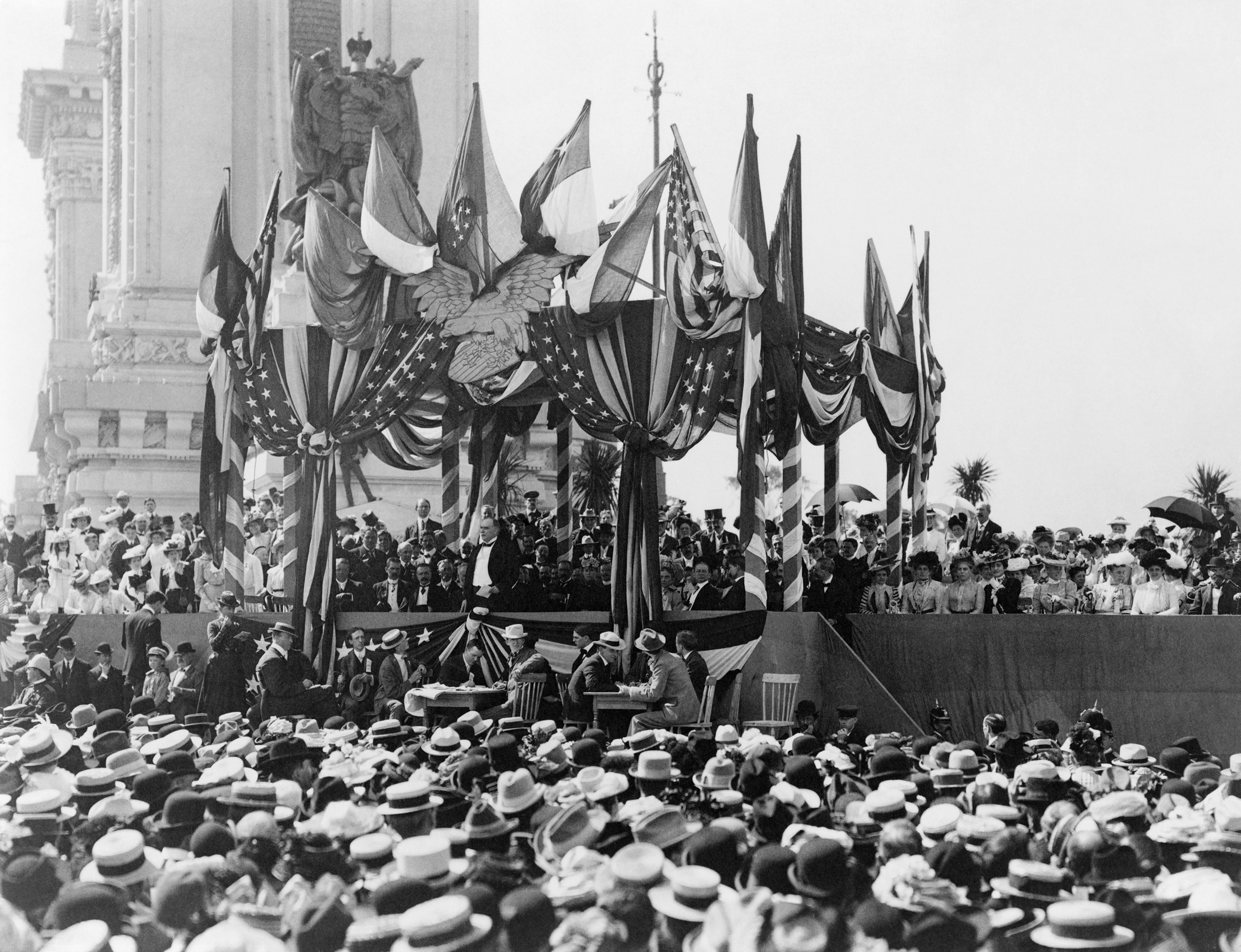
William McKinley (to the left of center, with white shirtfront) delivers his final speech.

In his final speech, McKinley urged an end to American isolationism. He proposed trade arrangements which would gain American manufacturers new markets. He stated,

The period of exclusiveness is past. The expansion of our trade and commerce is the pressing problem. Commercial wars are unprofitable.

The crowd greeted his speech with loud applause; at its conclusion, the president escorted his wife back to her carriage, as she was to return to the Milburn House while he saw the sights at the fair.

McKinley toured the pavilions of other Western Hemisphere nations, attracting crowds and applause wherever he went. He presided over a luncheon at the New York State Building (now the Buffalo History Museum) and attended a by-invitation-only reception at the Government Building. He was heavily guarded by soldiers and police, but still tried to interact with the public, encouraging those who tried to run to him by noticing them, and bowing to a group of loud young popcorn sellers. He made an unscheduled stop for coffee at the Porto Rican (Note: Puerto Rico was often spelled Porto Rico before 1932.) Building before returning to the Milburn House in the late afternoon. Despite a Cortelyou warning to the organizers that she might not attend due to her delicate health, Ida McKinley had been present at a luncheon in her honor by the Exposition's Board of Lady Managers, and after dinner, the president and first lady returned to the fairgrounds, pausing at the Triumphal Bridge to view the fair illuminated by electricity as the sun set. They went by boat to the Life Saving Station to watch the fireworks from there before returning to the Milburn House.

Czolgosz, gun in his pocket, had arrived early at the fair and was quite close to the podium before McKinley arrived. He considered shooting the president during his speech, but felt he could not be certain of hitting his target; he was also being jostled by the crowd. Czolgosz had not made up his mind when McKinley concluded his speech and disappeared behind security guards. Nevertheless, he attempted to follow McKinley as the president began his tour of the fair, but was thrust back by officers. Czolgosz saw no further chance at getting close to the president that day, and he returned to his $2 per week rented room above a saloon.

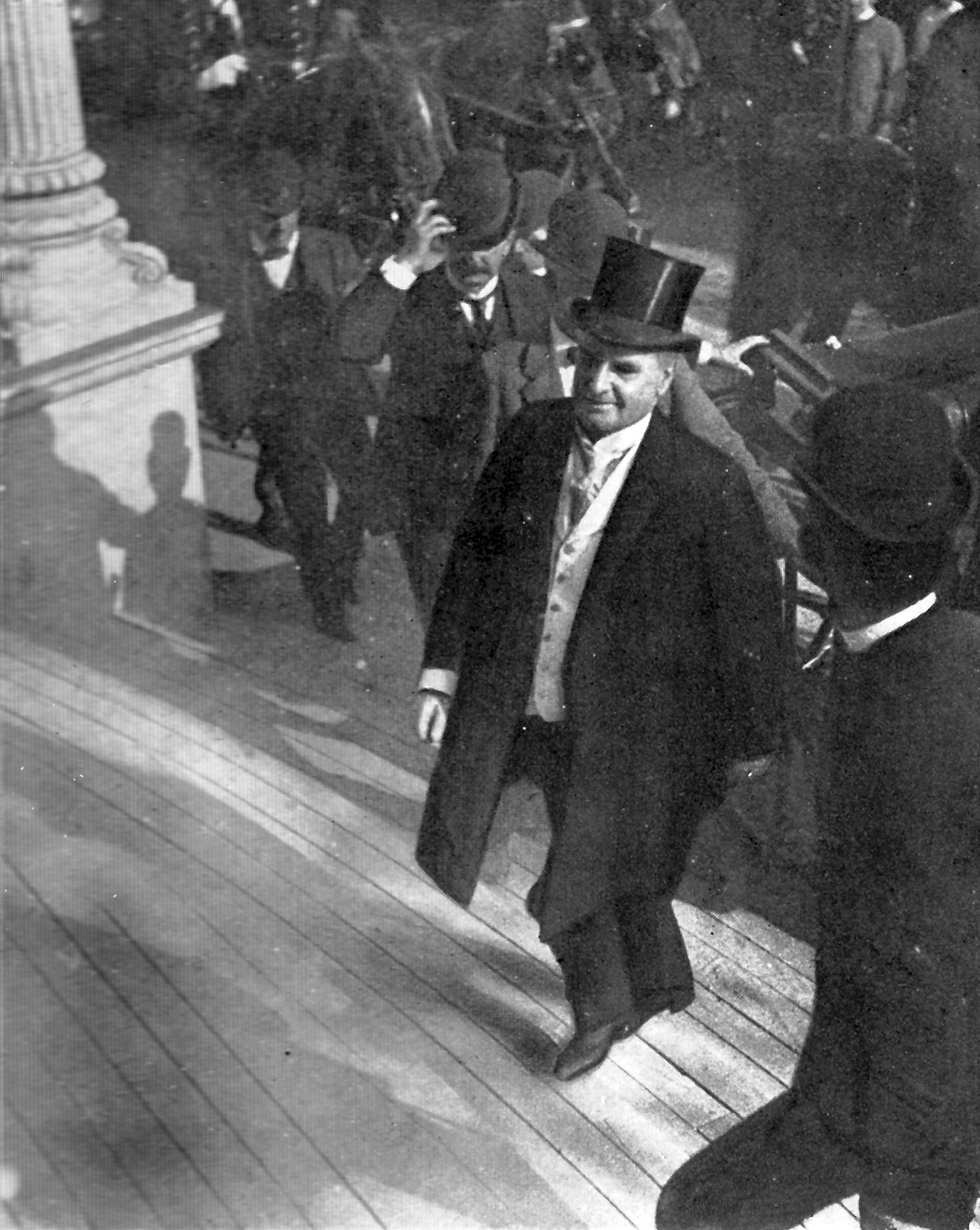
President McKinley arrives at the Temple of Music.

On Friday morning, McKinley dressed formally as usual, then departed the Milburn House for a stroll through the neighborhood. The president nearly slipped away unguarded; when the police and soldiers noticed him leaving, they hurried after him. Czolgosz also rose early, with the intent of lining up for the public reception at the Temple of Music; he reached the Exposition gates at 8:30 am, in time to see the president pass in his carriage en route to the train station for the visit to Niagara Falls.

The McKinleys traveled by train to Lewiston, where they switched to trolleys to view the Niagara Gorge. When the party reached the municipality of Niagara Falls, they transferred to carriages to see the sights. The party rode halfway across the Honeymoon Bridge overlooking the Falls, though McKinley was careful not to enter Canada for reasons of protocol. It was a hot day, and Ida McKinley felt ill due to the heat; she was driven to the International Hotel to await her husband, who toured Goat Island before joining his wife for lunch. After smoking a cigar on the veranda, the president rode with his wife to the train which awaited them nearby, and saw her settled there before touring the hydroelectric plant at the Falls. The train then returned to Buffalo so McKinley could attend the reception at the Temple of Music. Ida McKinley had originally intended to accompany her husband to the auditorium, but as she was not fully recovered, she decided to return to the Milburn House to rest. As the time allotted for the reception had been pared down to ten minutes, the president did not expect to be separated from his wife for long. As it was only 3:30 p.m., McKinley stopped for refreshments at the Mission Building before proceeding to the Temple of Music.

== Shooting and death of McKinley ==
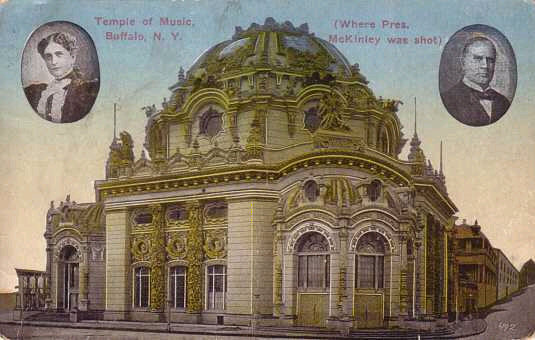
The Temple of Music, as seen on a post card. Like most of the Exposition's structures, it was removed after the Exposition closed.

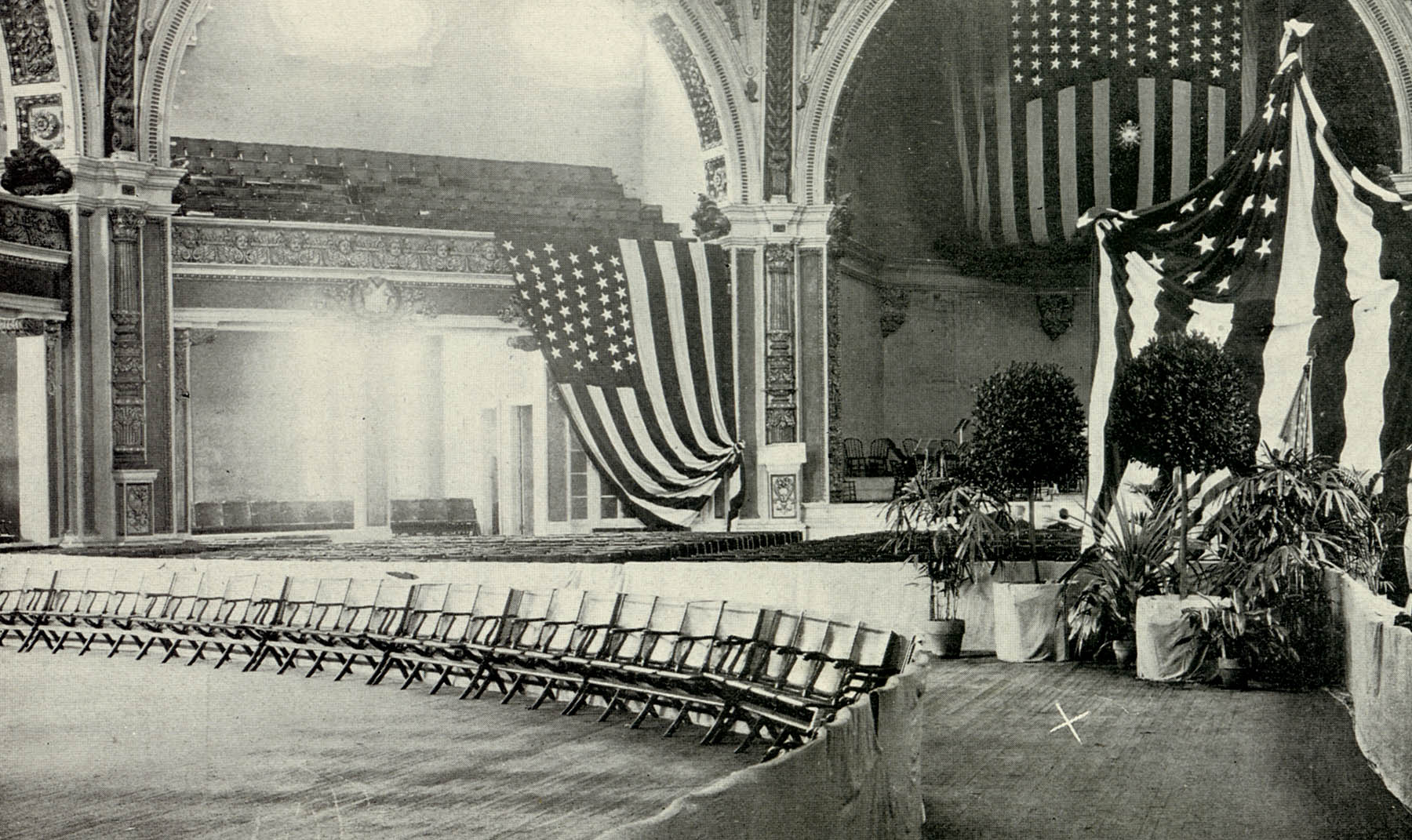
Scene of the shooting inside the Temple of Music. The spot where McKinley was shot is marked with an X, near the bottom-right corner of the picture.

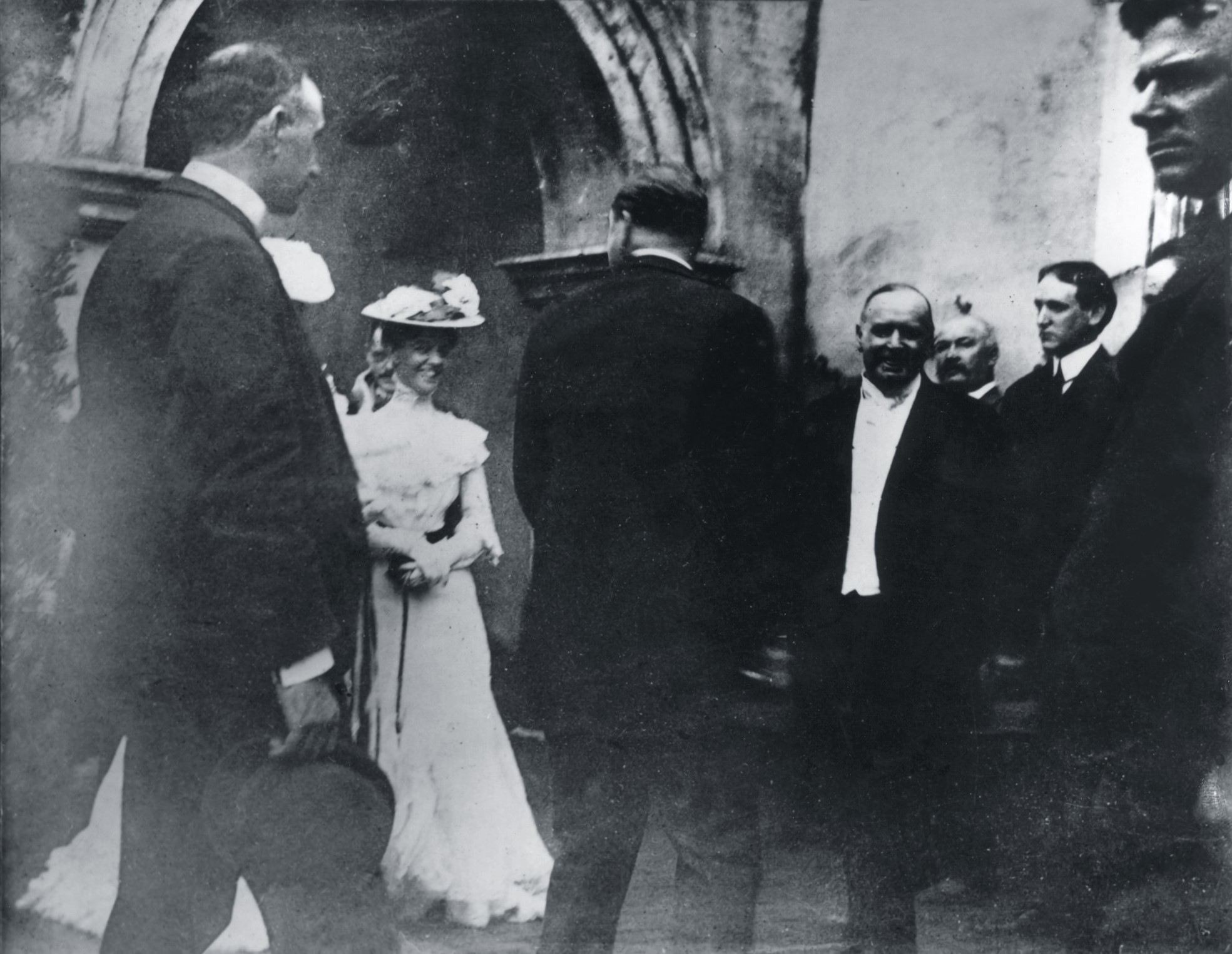
President McKinley greeting the public in the Temple of Music

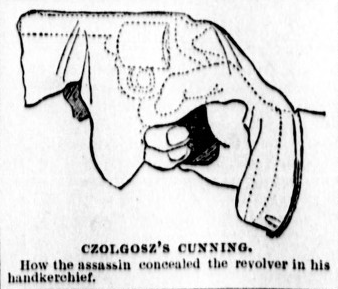
Illustration of how Czolgosz's gun was concealed. Chicago Eagle, September 14, 1901

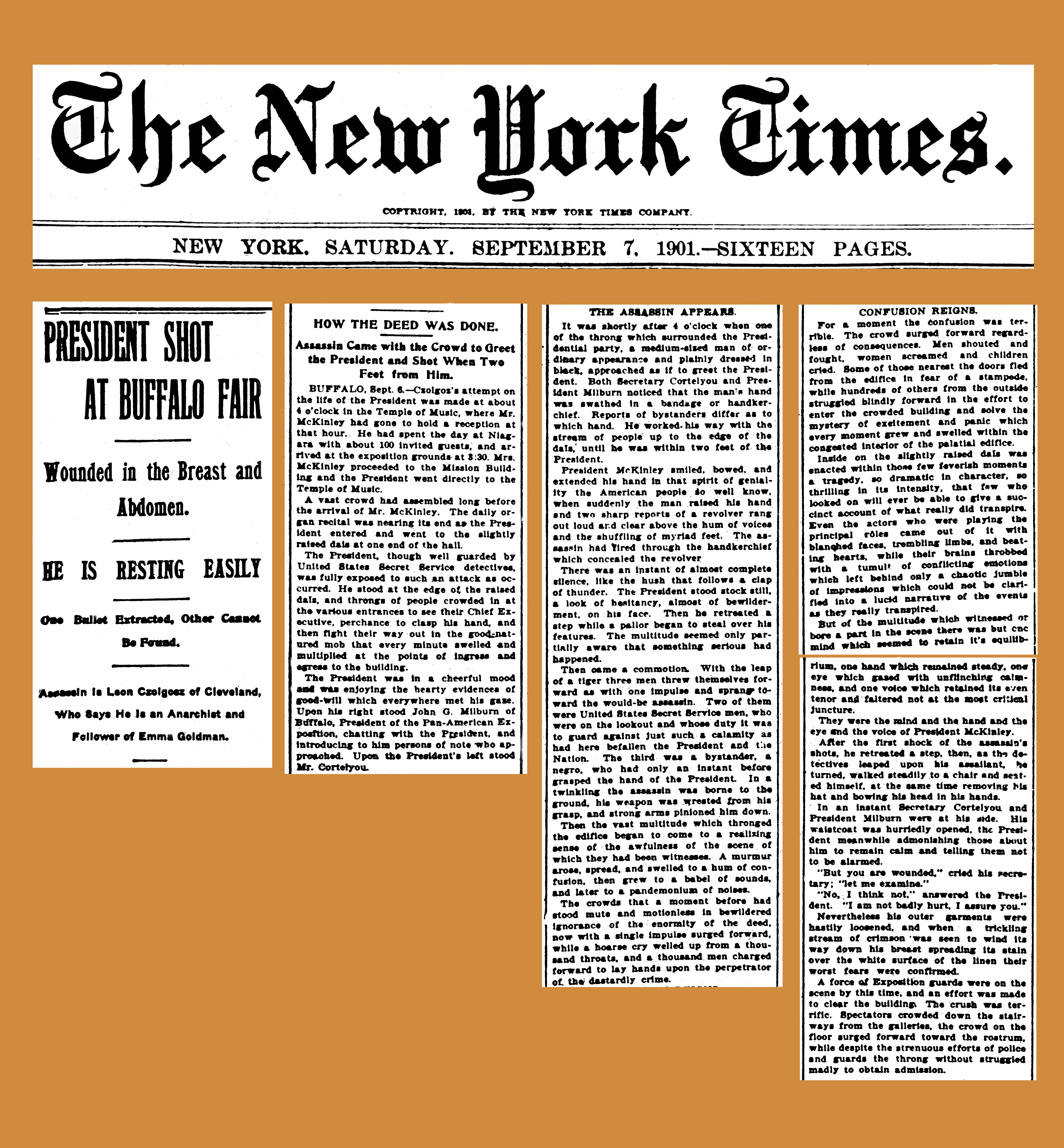
The New York Times detailed the shooting – "How the Deed Was Done" – on its September 7 front page.

=== At the Temple of Music ===
When given the opportunity to host a public reception for President McKinley, fair organizers chose to hold it in the Temple of Music – Louis L. Babcock, grand marshal of the Exposition, regarded the building as ideal for the purpose. The large auditorium was located close to the Esplanade, in the heart of the fair, and had doorways on each of its four sides. In addition to rows of chairs on the floor of the hall, it had spacious galleries. Babcock spent the morning of September 6 making some physical arrangements for the reception. Floor seating was removed to create a broad aisle, running from the east doors through which the public would be admitted, to where McKinley would stand. Once members of the public shook hands with McKinley, they would continue on to exit the building. An American flag was draped behind the president, both to screen him from behind and for decoration – several potted plants were arrayed around his place to create an attractive scene. Besides its utility for other purposes, the ornate building was one of the architectural features of the fair.

Considerable arrangements had been made for the president's security. Exposition police were stationed at the doors, and Buffalo police detectives guarded the aisle. In addition to McKinley's usual Secret Service agent, George Foster, two other agents had been assigned to the Buffalo trip because of Cortelyou's security concerns. Babcock was made nervous by a joke at lunch in an Exposition restaurant that the president might be shot during the reception. He had arranged for a dozen artillerymen to attend the reception in full-dress uniform, intending to use them as decoration. Instead, he had them stand in the aisle with instructions to close on any suspicious-looking person who might approach the president. These men were not trained in police work, and served to crowd the area in front of the president and obstruct the views of the detectives and Secret Service. At such events, Foster usually stood just to the left and behind McKinley. Milburn wished to stand to McKinley's left to be able to introduce anyone he knew in the line to the president, and Foster and another agent instead stood across the aisle from McKinley.

Throughout the afternoon, crowds had filled the floor outside the blocked-off aisle, and the galleries as well, wanting to see the president, even if they could not greet him. McKinley arrived just on time, glanced at the arrangements, and walked over to his place, where he stood with Milburn on his left and Cortelyou on his right. The pipe organ began to play "The Star-Spangled Banner" as McKinley ordered the doors open to admit those who had waited to greet him. The police let them in, and McKinley prepared to perform his "favorite part of the job". An experienced politician, McKinley could shake hands with 50 people per minute, gripping their hands first so as to both guide them past him quickly and prevent his fingers from being squeezed. Cortelyou anxiously watched the time; about halfway through the ten minutes allotted, he sent word to Babcock to have the doors closed when the presidential secretary raised his hand. Seeing Cortelyou looking at his watch, Babcock moved towards the doors. As the reception continued, the organist played works by Johann Sebastian Bach. The procession of citizens shaking hands with their President was interrupted when 12-year-old Myrtle Ledger of Spring Brook, New York, who was accompanied by her mother, asked McKinley for the red carnation he always wore on his lapel. The president gave it to her, then resumed work without his trademark good-luck piece. The Secret Service men looked suspiciously on a tall, swarthy man who appeared restless as he walked towards the president, but he shook hands with McKinley without incident and began to move towards the exit. The usual rule that those who approached the president must do so with their hands open and empty was not being enforced, perhaps due to the heat of the day, as several people were using handkerchiefs to wipe their brows; the man who followed the swarthy individual had his right hand wrapped in one, as if injured. Seeing this, McKinley reached for his left hand instead. As the two men's hands touched at 4:07 p.m., Czolgosz shot McKinley twice in the abdomen with a .32 Iver Johnson revolver concealed under the handkerchief.

As onlookers gazed in horror, and as McKinley lurched forward a step, Czolgosz prepared to take a third shot. However, James Parker, an American of African and Spanish descent from Georgia who had been behind Czolgosz in line, slammed into the assassin, reaching for the gun. A split second after Parker struck Czolgosz, so did Buffalo detective John Geary and one of the artillerymen, Francis O'Brien. Czolgosz disappeared beneath a pile of men, some of whom were punching or hitting him with rifle butts. He was heard to say, "I done my duty." McKinley staggered backwards and to the right, but was prevented from falling by Cortelyou, Milburn, and Detective Geary; they guided him across some fallen bunting to a chair. The president tried to convince Cortelyou he was not seriously injured, but blood was visible as he tried to expose his injury. Seeing the pummeling being taken by Czolgosz, McKinley ordered it stopped. Czolgosz was dragged away, but not before being searched by Secret Service Agent Foster. When Czolgosz kept turning his head to watch the president while being searched, Foster struck him to the ground with one punch.

After stopping the beating of Czolgosz, McKinley's next concern was for his wife, urging Cortelyou, "My wife – be careful, Cortelyou, how you tell her – oh, be careful." The initial crowd reaction had been panic, and an attempt to flee the hall, which was frustrated by others surging inwards to see what had occurred. As McKinley was carried out on a stretcher to an electric-powered ambulance, there was a moan from the crowd at the sight of the president's ashen face. Foster rode with him to the fair's hospital. On the way there, McKinley felt in his clothing and came out with a metal object. "I believe that is a bullet." McKinley had been shot twice; one bullet had deflected off a button and only grazed him; the other had penetrated his abdomen.

=== Operation ===
The ambulance carrying McKinley reached the Exposition hospital at 4:18 p.m. Although it usually dealt only with the minor medical issues of fairgoers, the hospital did have an operating theatre. At the time of the shooting, no fully qualified doctor was at the hospital, only nurses and interns. The best surgeon in the city and the Exposition's medical director, Roswell Park, was in Niagara Falls, performing a delicate neck operation. When interrupted during the procedure on September 6 to be told he was needed in Buffalo, he responded that he could not leave, even for the president of the United States. He was then told who had been shot. Park, two weeks later, would save the life of a woman who suffered injuries almost identical to McKinley's.

The first physician to arrive at the hospital was Herman Mynter, whom the president had met briefly the previous day; McKinley, who had a good memory for faces, joked that when he had met Mynter, he had not expected to need his professional services. As McKinley lay on the operating table, he stated of Czolgosz, "He didn't know, poor fellow, what he was doing. He couldn't have known."

With Park unavailable and with the fading afternoon light the major source of illumination in the operating room, upon the arrival of another surgeon, Matthew D. Mann, the decision was made to operate at once to try to remove the remaining bullet. Mynter had given McKinley an injection of morphine and strychnine to ease his pain; Mann, a noted gynecologist without experience in abdominal wounds, administered ether to sedate McKinley as the wounded man murmured the Lord's Prayer.

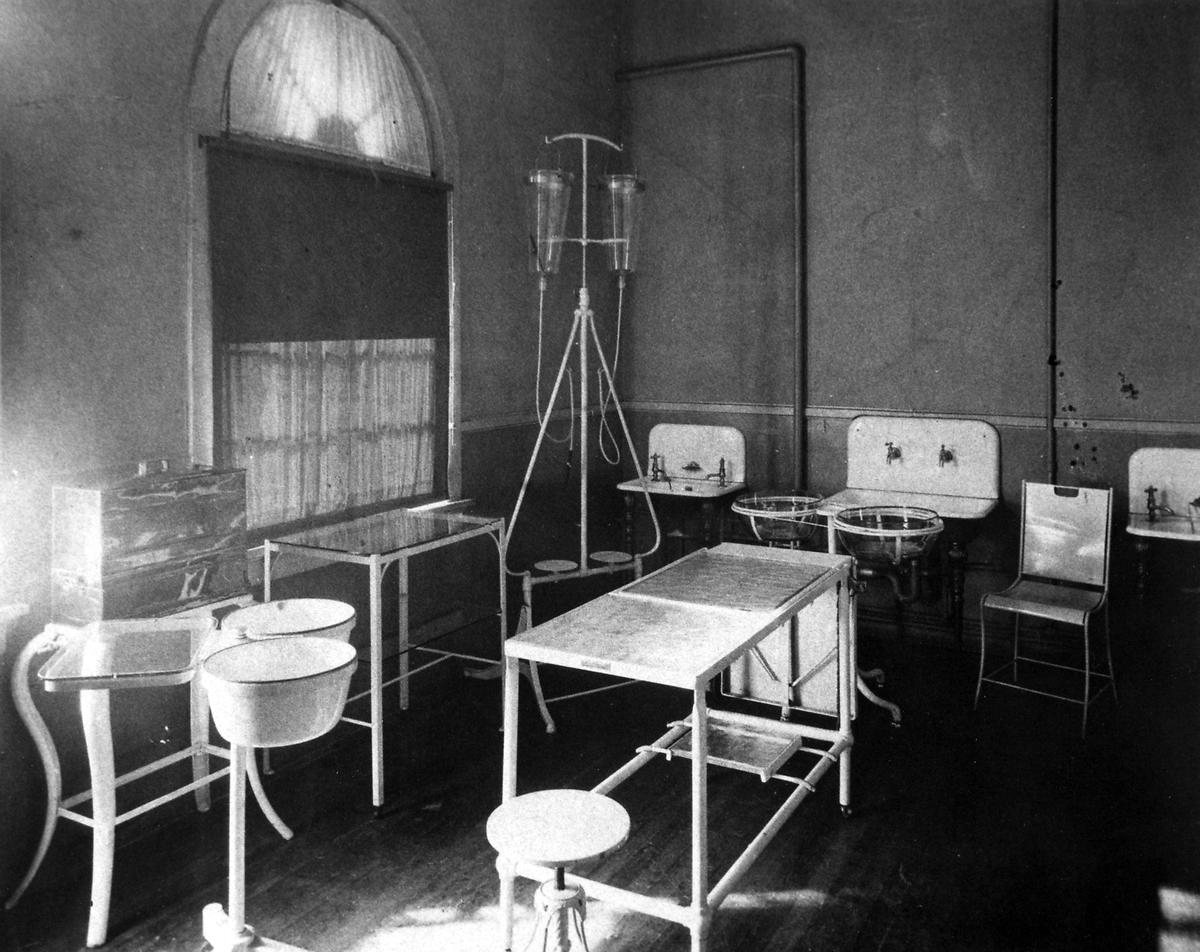
The operating room at the Exposition hospital

For hundreds of years, abdominal gunshot wounds had meant death by gangrene or other infection, with doctors able to do little more than ease pain. Only seventeen years before, Emil Kocher, a Swiss surgeon, had been the first to successfully operate on a patient who had received such a wound.

To increase the lighting, sunlight was reflected onto the wound by another physician; towards the end of the surgery, an electric light was rigged. The hospital lacked basic surgical equipment such as retractors. With McKinley in a weakened condition, Mann could do little probing of the wound to try to find the bullet; his work was complicated by the fact that the president was obese. The surgeon made an incision and found and removed a small piece of cloth which was embedded in the flesh. He probed with his finger and hand, finding damage to the digestive system – the stomach displayed both an entry and exit wound. Mann sewed up both holes, but could not find the bullet itself; he concluded it had lodged in the president's back muscles. He later wrote, "A bullet once it ceases to move does little harm." A primitive X-ray machine was on display at the fair but was not used on McKinley; Mann later stated that its use might have disturbed the patient and done little good. He used black silk thread to stitch the incision and wound, without drainage, and covered the area with a bandage. As the operation concluded, Park arrived; he was unwilling to interfere and at 5:20, McKinley was given another shot of painkiller and allowed to awaken. He was taken to the Milburn House by the electric ambulance.

The first lady had not been told of the president's shooting; once the surgery was complete, the presidential physician, Presley M. Rixey, gently told her what had occurred. Ida McKinley took the news calmly; she wrote in her diary, "Went to Niagra [sic] Falls this morning. My Dearest was receiving in a public hall on our return, when he was shot by a ... " Leech, in her biography of President McKinley, suggests that the first lady could not write the word, "anarchist".

=== Apparent recovery; eventual death ===
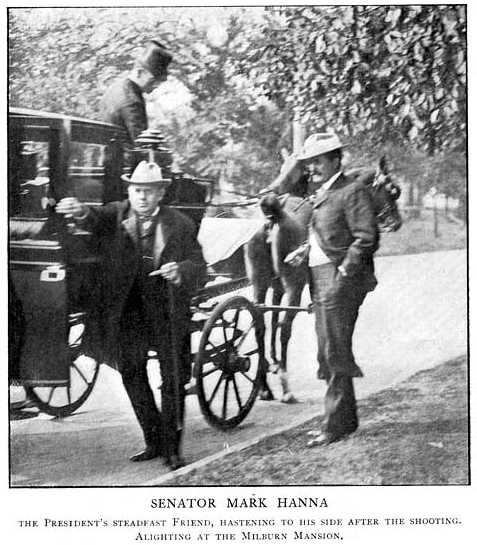
Senator Mark Hanna (left), friend of President McKinley, arriving at the Milburn House after the shooting

Within minutes of the shots, the news was conveyed around the world by telegraph wire, in time for the late newspaper editions in the United States. In the era before radio, thousands stood in cities across the country outside newspaper offices, awaiting the latest bulletin from Buffalo. Fears that McKinley would not survive the day of his shooting were allayed by reassuring bulletins issued by Cortelyou based on information from the doctors. Large, threatening crowds assembled outside Buffalo police headquarters where Czolgosz was brought. Word that he had admitted to being an anarchist led to attacks on others of that belief: one was nearly lynched in Pittsburgh.

At the Milburn House, McKinley seemed to be recovering. On Saturday, September 7, he was relaxed and conversational. His wife was allowed to see him, as was Cortelyou; the president asked his secretary, "How did they like my speech?" and was pleased to hear of positive reactions. Meanwhile, Vice President Roosevelt (who had been in Vermont), much of the Cabinet, and Senator Hanna hurried to Buffalo. Cortelyou continued to issue encouraging bulletins. The president was permitted few visitors, and complained of loneliness. As the crisis seemed to have passed, dignitaries started to leave on September 9, confident of the president's recovery. Roosevelt left for a vacation in the Adirondack Mountains after expressing outrage that Czolgosz might serve only a few years under New York State law for attempted murder, the maximum penalty for attempted murder in New York at that time being ten years. Attorney General Philander Knox went to Washington, searching for a means to prosecute Czolgosz under federal law. Secretary of State John Hay had been closely associated with the two presidents to be assassinated: he had been Lincoln's secretary, and a close friend of James A. Garfield. He arrived on September 10; met at the station by Babcock with an account of the president's recovery, Hay responded that the president would die.

McKinley biographer H. Wayne Morgan wrote of the week following the shooting:

His hearty constitution, everyone said, would see him through. The doctors seemed hopeful, even confident ... It is difficult to understand the cheer with which they viewed their patient. He was nearly sixty years old, overweight, and the wound itself had not been thoroughly cleaned or traced. Precautions against infections, admittedly difficult in 1901, were negligently handled.

According to McKinley biographer Margaret Leech, McKinley's apparent recovery "was merely the resistance of his strong body to the gangrene that was creeping along the bullet's track through the stomach, the pancreas, and one kidney". Another X-ray machine was sent from New Jersey by its inventor, Thomas Edison. It was not used on the president; sources vary on why this was – Leech stated that the machine, which she says was procured by Cortelyou and accompanied by a trained operator, was not used on orders of the doctors in charge of McKinley's case. Miller recounts that doctors attempted to test it on a man of about McKinley's size, but it proved to be missing a crucial part, much to Edison's embarrassment.

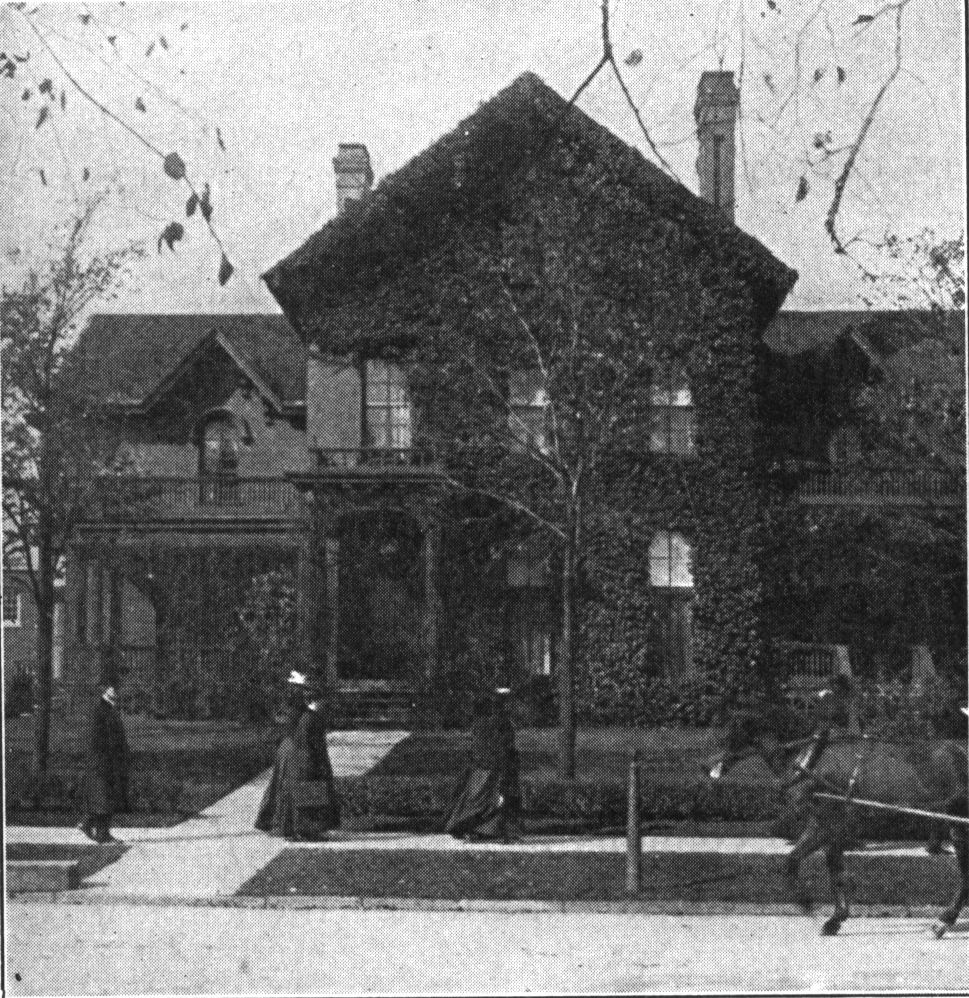
The Milburn residence, 1168 Delaware Avenue, where McKinley died. The house was later torn down; on the site today is Canisius High School.

McKinley had been given nutritive enemas; on September 11, he took some broth by mouth. When it seemed to do him good, the following morning they allowed him toast, coffee, and chicken broth. His subsequent pain was diagnosed as indigestion; he was given purgatives and most doctors left after their evening consultation. In the early morning of September 13, McKinley suffered a collapse. Urgent word was sent to Vice President Roosevelt to return to Buffalo; as the vice-president was 12 mi (19 km) from the nearest telegraph or telephone in the Adirondack wilderness, a park ranger was sent to find him.

Specialists were summoned; although at first some doctors hoped that McKinley might survive with a weakened heart, by afternoon they knew the case was hopeless. As yet unknown to the doctors, gangrene was growing on the walls of his stomach and toxins were passing into his blood. McKinley drifted in and out of consciousness all day; when awake he was the model patient. By evening, McKinley too knew he was dying, "It is useless, gentlemen. I think we ought to have prayer." His friends and family were admitted, and the first lady sobbed over him, "I want to go, too. I want to go, too." Her husband replied, "We are all going, we are all going. God's will be done, not ours" and with final strength put an arm around her. He may also have sung part of his favorite hymn, "Nearer, My God, to Thee", although other accounts have her singing it softly to him. Ida McKinley was led away, her place briefly taken by Senator Hanna. Morgan recounts their final encounter, "Sometime that terrible evening, Mark Hanna had approached the bedside, tears standing in his eyes, his hands and head shaking in disbelief that thirty years of friendship could end thus." When a tentative, formal greeting gained no coherent response, Hanna "cried out over the years of friendship, 'William, William, don't you know me?'"

At 2:15 a.m. on Saturday, September 14, 1901, President McKinley died. At the time of McKinley's death, Roosevelt was on his return journey to Buffalo, racing over the mountain roads by carriage to the nearest railroad station, where a special train was waiting. When he reached the station at dawn, he learned of McKinley's death.

== Aftermath ==
He, the said William McKinley, from the said sixth day of September, in the year aforesaid, until the fourteenth day of September, in the same year aforesaid, in the city and county aforesaid, did languish and languishing did live; on which said last mentioned day he, the said William McKinley, of the said mortal wound did die.

— From the indictment by the grand jury of the County Court of Erie County for first-degree murder in State of New York v. Leon Czolgosz, September 16, 1901.

An autopsy was performed later on the morning of McKinley's death. Mann led a team of 14 physicians. They found the bullet had passed through the stomach, then through the transverse colon, and vanished through the peritoneum after penetrating a corner of the left kidney. There was also damage to the adrenal glands and pancreas. Mynter, who participated in the autopsy, later stated his belief that the bullet lodged somewhere in the back muscles, though this is uncertain as it was never found. After four hours, Ida McKinley demanded that the autopsy end. A death mask was taken, and private services took place in the Milburn House before the body was moved to Buffalo City and County Hall for the start of five days of national mourning. McKinley's body was ceremoniously taken from Buffalo to Washington and then to Canton. On the day of the funeral, September 19, as McKinley was taken from his home on North Market Street for the last time, all activity ceased in the nation for five minutes. Trains came to a halt, telephone and telegraph service was stopped. Leech stated, "the people bowed in homage to the President who was gone".

In addition to the damage done by the bullet, the autopsy also found that the president was suffering from cardiomyopathy (fatty degeneration of the heart muscle). This would have weakened his heart and made him less able to recover from such an injury, and was thought to be related to his overweight frame and lack of exercise. Modern scholars generally believe that McKinley died of pancreatic necrosis, a condition that is difficult to treat today and would have been completely impossible for the doctors of his time.

Czolgosz went on trial for the murder of McKinley in state court in Buffalo on September 23, 1901, nine days after the president died. Prosecution testimony took two days and consisted principally of the doctors who treated McKinley and various eyewitnesses to the shooting. Defense attorney Loran L. Lewis and his co-counsel called no witnesses, which Lewis in his closing argument attributed to Czolgosz's refusal to cooperate with them. In his 27-minute address to the jury, Lewis took pains to praise President McKinley; Miller notes that the closing argument was more calculated to defend the attorney's "place in the community, rather than an effort to spare his client the electric chair". After a bare half-hour of deliberations (which a jury member later remarked would have actually been shorter, if not for examining the evidence), the jury convicted Czolgosz. He was subsequently sentenced to death and executed by electric chair on October 29, 1901. Acid was placed in the casket to dissolve his body, before burial in the prison graveyard.

After McKinley's murder, newspaper editorials across the country heavily criticized the lack of protection afforded to American presidents. Though it still lacked any legislative mandate, by 1902, the Secret Service, a unit of the Treasury Department, was protecting President Theodore Roosevelt full-time. This did not settle the debate. Some in Congress recommended the United States Army be charged with protecting the president. In 1906, Congress passed legislation officially designating the Secret Service as the agency in charge of presidential security.

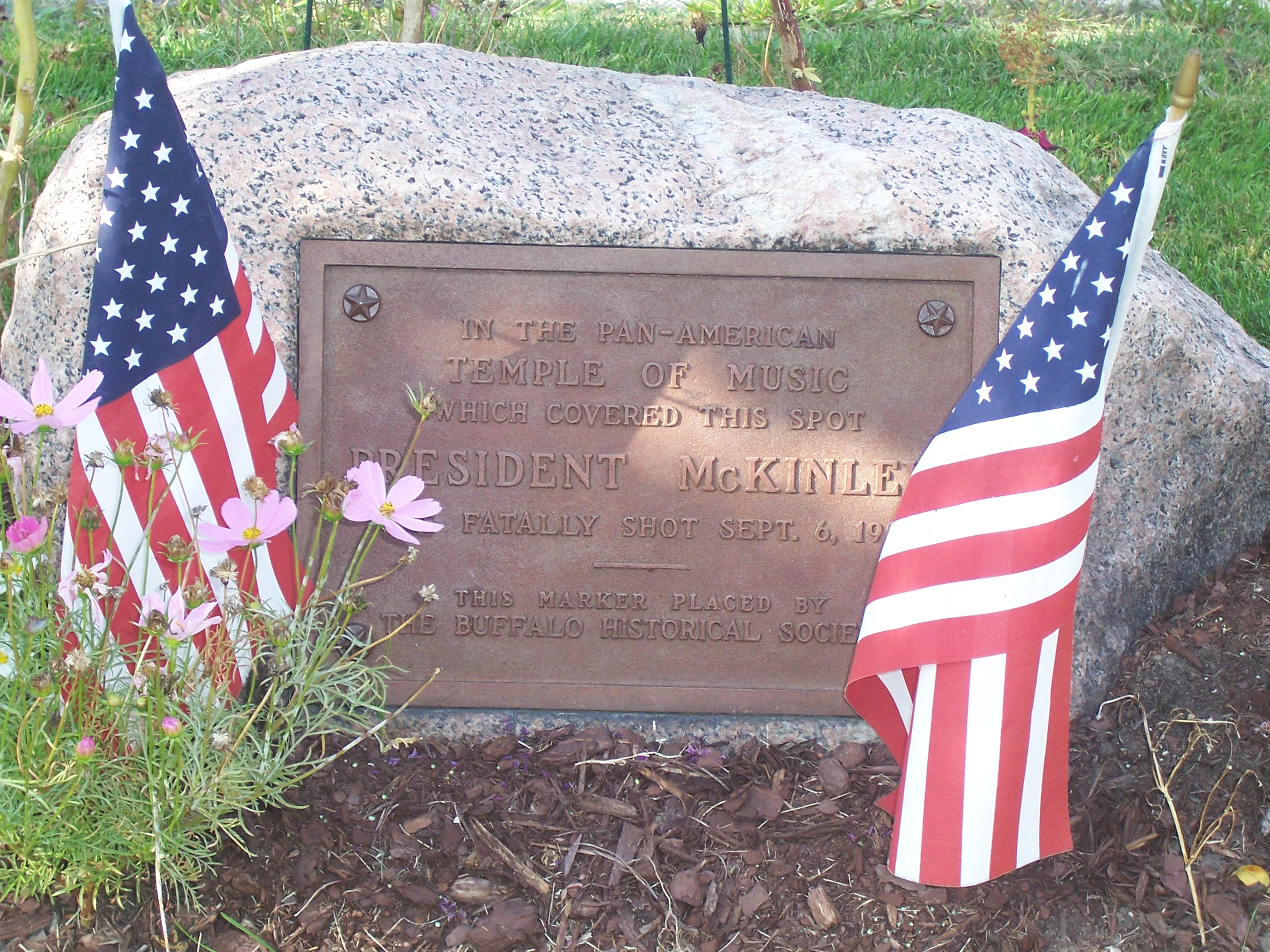
The assassination site

The aftermath of the assassination saw a backlash against anarchists. The Buffalo police announced soon after the shooting that they believed Czolgosz had not acted alone, and several anarchists were arrested on suspicion of involvement in the attack. Czolgosz mentioned his contacts with Emma Goldman during his interrogation; authorities arrested her family to give her incentive to turn herself in, which she did on September 10. She spent nearly three weeks in jail. She, like all other arrestees thought to have conspired with Czolgosz, was released without charge. Anarchist colonies and newspapers were attacked by vigilantes; although no one was killed, there was considerable property damage. Fear of anarchists led to surveillance programs which were eventually consolidated in 1908 as the Federal Bureau of Investigation. Anti-anarchist laws passed in the wake of the assassination lay dormant for some years before being used during and after World War I, alongside newly passed statutes, against non-citizens whose views were deemed a threat. Among those deported in December 1919 was Goldman, who did not have American citizenship.

Leech believed the nation experienced a transition at McKinley's death:

The new President was in office. The republic still lived. Yet, for a space, Americans turned from the challenge and the strangeness of the future. Entranced and regretful, they remembered McKinley's firm, unquestioning faith, his kindly, frock-coated dignity; his accessibility and dedication to the people: the federal simplicity that would not be seen again in Washington ... [After McKinley's death,] old men came to the [White House] on errands of state and politics, but their primacy was disputed by the young men crowding forward. The nation felt another leadership, nervous, aggressive, and strong. Under command of a bold young captain, America set sail on the stormy voyage of the twentieth century.

== See also ==
- Assassination of John F. Kennedy
- List of United States presidential assassination attempts and plots

== Sources ==
Books

- Bumgarner, Jeffrey (2006). Federal Agents: The Growth of Federal Law Enforcement in America. Westport, Connecticut: Greenwood Press. ISBN 978-0-275-98953-8.
- Horner, William T. (2010). Ohio's Kingmaker: Mark Hanna, Man and Myth. Athens, Ohio: Ohio University Press. ISBN 978-0-8214-1894-9.
- Johns, A. Wesley (1970). The Man Who Shot McKinley. South Brunswick, New Jersey: A.S. Barnes. ISBN 978-0-498-07521-6.
- Kedward, Harry Roderick (1971). The Anarchists: The Men who Shocked an Era. American Heritage Press. ISBN 978-0-356-03721-9.
- Leech, Margaret (1959). In the Days of McKinley. New York: Harper and Brothers. OCLC 456809.
- McElroy, Richard L. (1996). William McKinley and Our America: A Pictorial History (softcover ed.). Canton, Ohio: Stark County Historical Society. ISBN 978-0-9634712-1-5.
- Merry, Robert W. (2017). President McKinley. Simon & Schuster. ISBN 978-1451625448.
- Miller, Scott (2011). The President and the Assassin. New York: Random House. ISBN 978-1-4000-6752-7.
- Morgan, H. Wayne (2003). William McKinley and His America (revised ed.). Kent, Ohio: The Kent State University Press. ISBN 978-0-87338-765-1.
- Olcott, Charles (1916). William McKinley. Vol. 2. Boston: Houghton Mifflin.
- Rauchway, Eric (2004). Murdering McKinley: The Making of Theodore Roosevelt's America. New York: Hill and Wang. ISBN 978-0-8090-1638-9.

Other sources

- Fine, Sidney (July 1955). "Anarchism and the assassination of McKinley". The American Historical Review. 60 (4): 777–799. doi:10.2307/1844919. JSTOR 1844919.
- Parker, LeRoy (December 1901). "The trial of the anarchist murderer Czolgosz". Yale Law Journal. 11 (2): 80–94. doi:10.2307/783764. JSTOR 783764.
- "President at Buffalo". The New York Times. September 6, 1901.
- "President going to big show". Philadelphia Record. September 4, 1901.
- "An interview with the President's nurses". The Trained Nurse and Hospital Review. 27 (4): 222–223. October 1901.
- "Special Contribution: The Official Report on the Case of President McKinley". Buffalo Medical Journal. Xll–LVII (4): 271–293. November 1901.
- "William McKinley: Autopsy Report". DoctorZebra.com. April 9, 2009. Archived from the original on November 23, 2010.
