= McKinley Vocational High School =

Location
- 1500 Elmwood Ave; Buffalo, New York 14207; United States; 42°56′15″N 78°52′47″W

Information
- Type: Public, vocational school
- Motto: Excellence Through Training
- Established: 1910
- School district: Buffalo Public Schools
- School number: 305
- NCES School ID: 360585000315
- Principal: Terence Jenkins
- Teaching staff: 91.22 (on an FTE basis)
- Grades: 9-12
- Enrollment: 862 (2024-2025)
- Student to teacher ratio: 9.45
- Campus: City: Large
- Colors: Black and Orange
- Mascot: Bulldog
- Team name: Macks
- Yearbook: President
- Website: www.buffaloschools.org/o/ps305

McKinley Vocational High School is a public high school in Buffalo, New York. The school is at 1500 Elmwood Avenue, and serves about 1200 students in grades 9 through 12.

== History ==
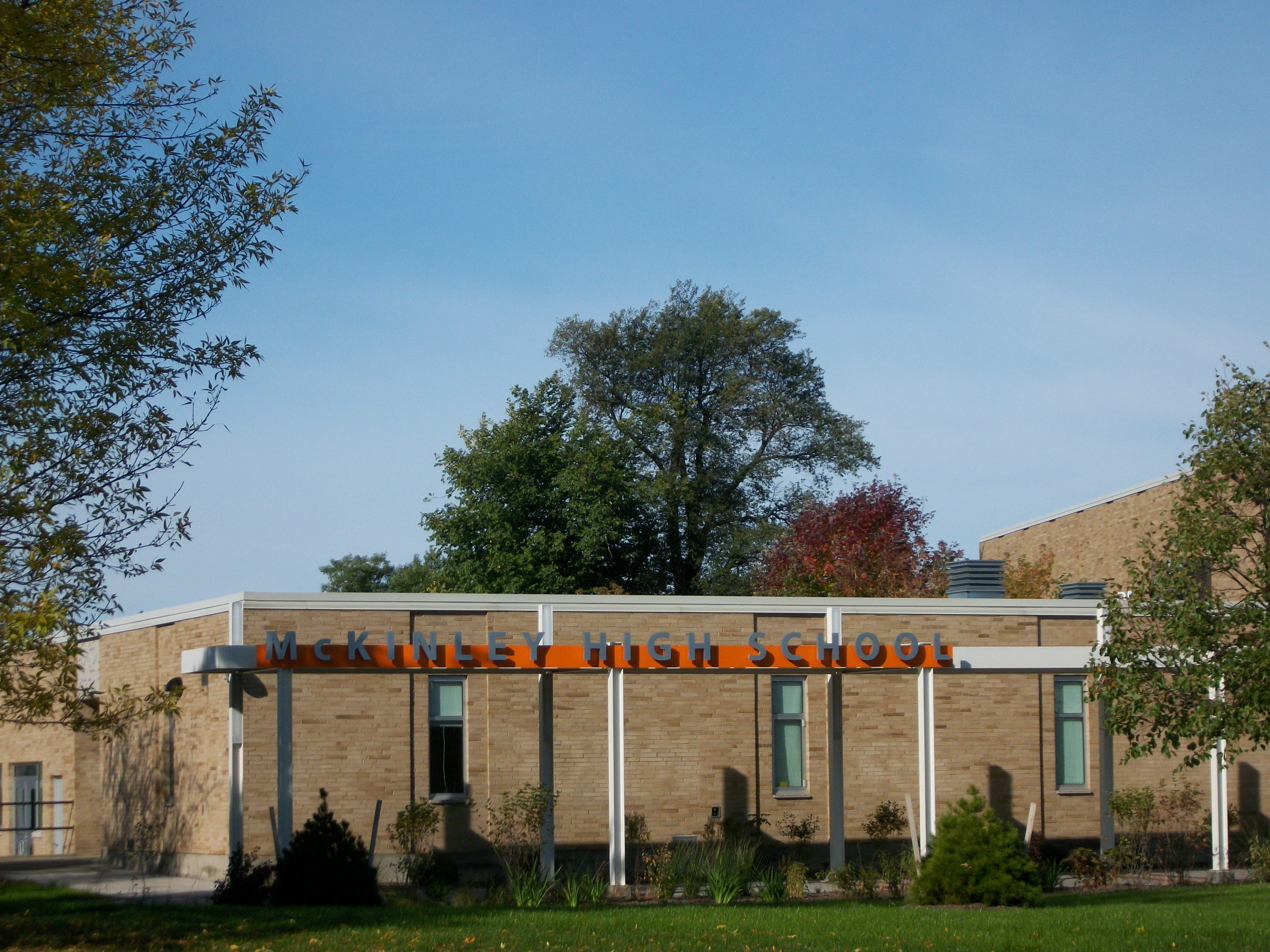
Sign on the south end of McKinley's campus

McKinley was formed in 1910 as Black Rock Vocational School. It moved into its current address on Elmwood in 1923, which formerly had housed the Buffalo Orphan's Asylum. The current building was built in 1966. The school is named for former United States President William McKinley, who was assassinated in 1901; he was shot and mortally wounded just a few blocks from the school.

In 2010, the building began undergoing extensive renovations to add more classroom space and expand its vocational programs. Ninth-graders were housed at the former School 56 until renovations were completed on the McKinley building. McKinley reopened to all students in fall 2012.

In March 2023, a painting of James Benjamin Parker, the man who attempted to stop President McKinley's assassination was unveiled at McKinley Vocational High School by Reverend William Cobb Jr.

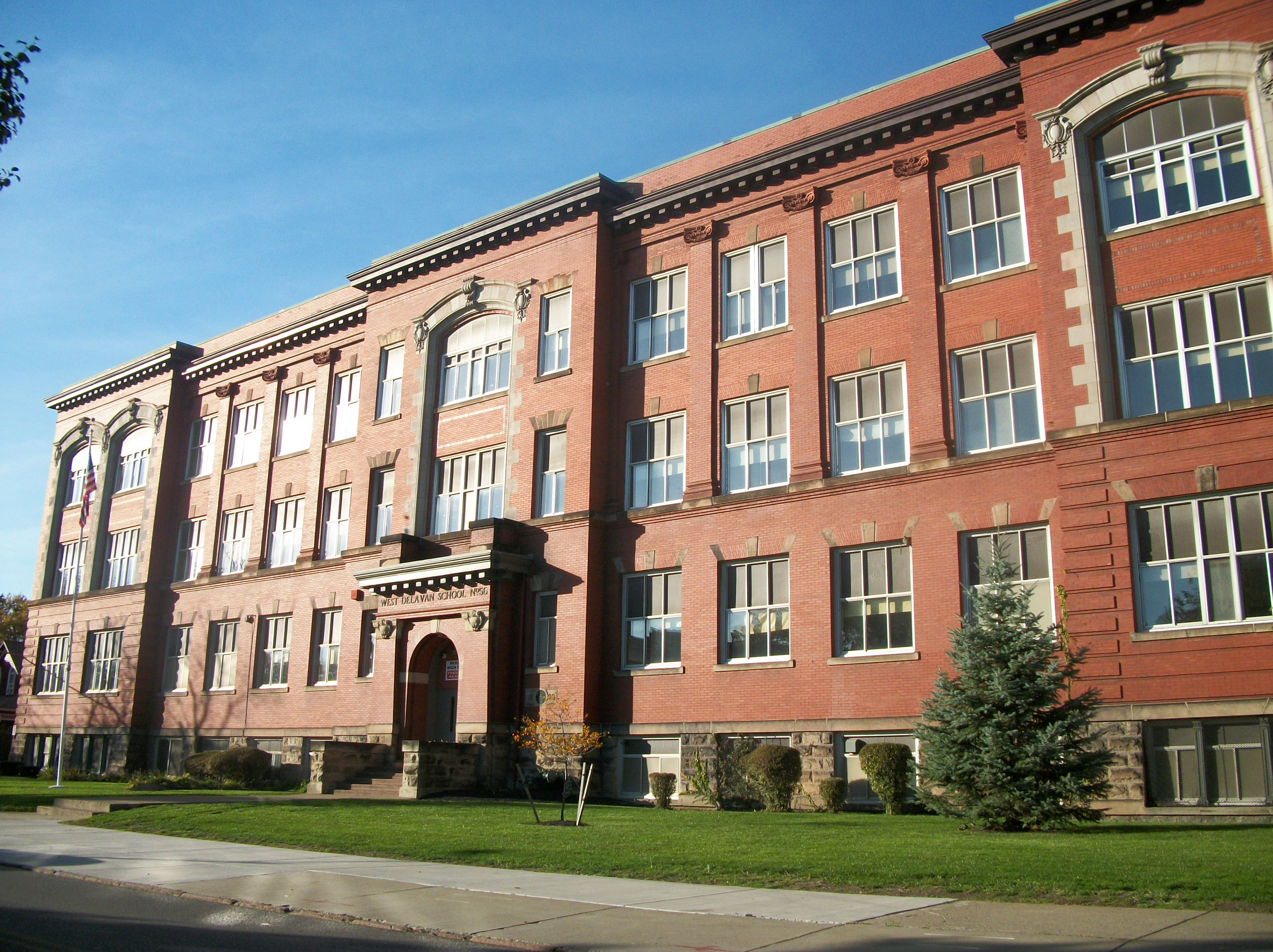
School 56, where McKinley 9th graders were housed from 2010 to 2012.

== Notable alumni ==
- Goo Goo Dolls, lead singer and guitarist John Rzeznik attended McKinley, graduating in 1983.
- Bob MacKinnon, College and professional basketball coach, graduating in 1946.

== Former principals ==
Previous assignment and reason for departure denoted in parentheses

- Samuel F. King, 1923-1934
- Robert S. Hoole, 1934-1953
- Ferdinand E. Kampreth, 1953-1965
- Albert B. Buck, 1965-1972
- James F. Harmon–1972-1984
- Ronald J. Meer, 1984-1987
- Crystal A. Boling-Barton, 1987-2017
- Marck E. Abraham [interim], 2017-2020
- Naomi R. Cerre [interim], 2020-2021
- Carmelita Burgin [interim], 2021-2022
- Mustafa Khalil, 2022-2023
