= The Black History of the White House =

2010 book by Clarence Lusane

- The Black History of the White House
- Author: Clarence Lusane
- Language: English
- Genre: Nonfiction
- Publisher: City Lights
- Publication date: November 2010
- Pages: 576
- ISBN: 978-0-87286-532-7

The Black History of the White House is a book by Clarence Lusane concerning the history of the African-American community's relationship to government and the White House as a symbol as well as a place of employment. The book begins with the founding of the United States and continues to the first few years of the Barack Obama administration.

== Summary ==
At the beginning of each chapter Lusane provides a narrative of an African-American's "White House Story" ranging from an escaped slave once belonging to George Washington to the First Lady Michelle Obama. Topics discussed included in the book are the Founding Fathers, the abolitionist movement, slave-owning presidents, Reconstruction, Jim Crow Laws and the Civil Rights Movement.

== Critical reception ==
Lusane speaks to White House staff

Following its 2010 publication The Black History of the White House has received much attention from the political community. To acknowledge the work, author Clarence Lusane was invited to the White House by President Barack Obama to speak with staff in March 2011.
