= Clarence Lusane =

American writer and activist (born 1953)

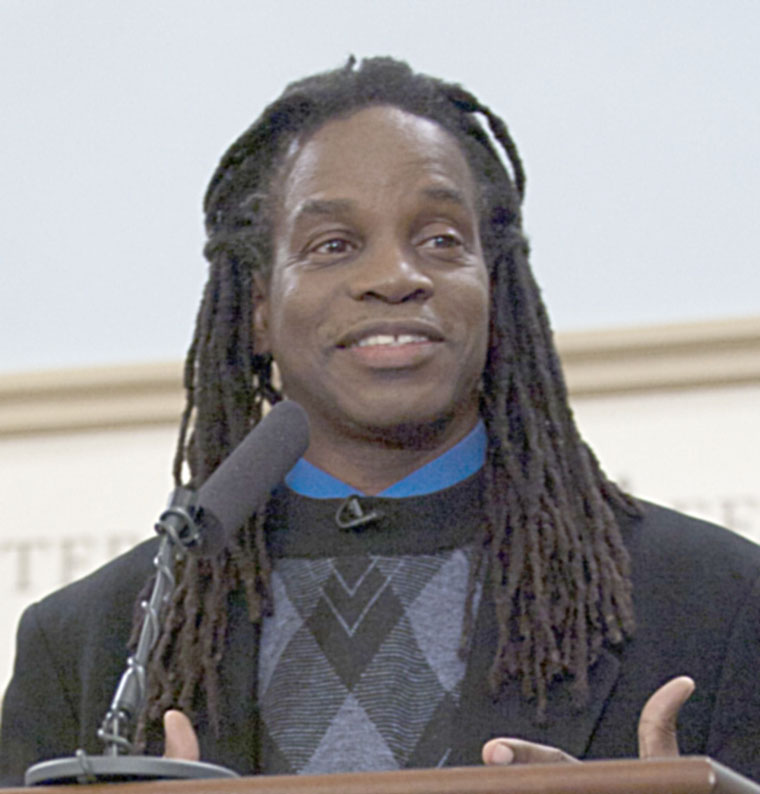
- Lusane in 2012
- Born: 1953 (age 72–73); Detroit, Michigan
- Education: Howard University (Ph.D.)
- Known for: The Black History of the White House; Colin Powell and Condoleezza Rice:Foreign Policy, Race, and the New American Century
- Scientific career
- Fields: International race politics Jazz influence on international relations
- Workplaces: American University
- Thesis: “The Interaction and Collaboration Between Black Interest Groups and Black Congressmembers in the 103rd Congress
- Website: http://clarencelusane.blogspot.com

Clarence Lusane (born 1953) is an American author, activist, lecturer and freelance journalist. His most recent major work is his book The Black History of the White House.

== Background ==
Clarence Lusane received his Ph.D. in political science from Howard University in 1997. For more than 30 years, Lusane has written about and been active in national and international anti-racism politics, globalization, U.S. foreign policy, human rights and social issues such as education and drug policy.

Lusane is the former editor of the journal Black Political Agenda, and has edited newsletters for a number of national non-profit organizations. He is a national columnist for the Black Voices syndicated news network, and his writings have appeared in The Black Scholar, Race & Class, The Washington Post, Oakland Tribune, CovertAction Quarterly, Z Communications, Radical History Journal and many other publications.

Lusane is the former chairman of the board of the National Alliance of Third World Journalists. As a journalist, he has traveled to numerous countries to investigate the political and social circumstances or crises faced by those nations. Various nations that he has reported on include Cuba, Egypt, Mexico, Jamaica, the Netherlands, North Korea, Italy, and South Africa.

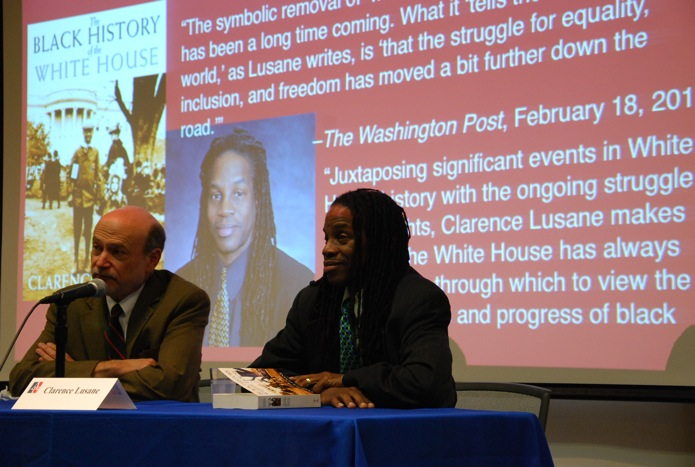
Lusane on a panel at American University

Lusane is an associate professor of political science at American University's School of International Service, where he teaches courses in comparative race relations, modern social movements, comparative politics of Africa, the Caribbean and Europe, black political theory and political behavior, international drug politics, and jazz and international relations. Lusane has lectured at numerous universities nationwide, including Harvard University, Georgetown University, George Washington University, the University of California, Berkeley, the University of Chicago and Yale University, among others. He has also lectured on US race relations in numerous foreign nations, including Colombia, Cuba, England, France, Germany, Guadeloupe, Haiti, Japan, the Netherlands, Panama, Switzerland, and Zimbabwe.

Lusane's current research interests are in international race politics, human rights, and electoral politics. He is currently conducting research on the intersection of jazz and international relations. This work examines how jazz has been politically and ideologically appropriated by a wide range of social groups in the international community.

== Awards and fellowships ==
For nearly 20 years, Lusane has won research and writing awards. His essay, “Rhapsodic Aspirations: Rap, Race, and Power Politics,” won the 1993 Larry Neal Writers’ Competition Grand Prize for Art Criticism. In 1983, his article, “Israeli Arms to Central America,” won the prestigious Project Censored Investigative Reporting Award as the most censored story of the year. In 2001-2002, he received the prestigious British Council Atlantic Fellowship in Public Policy where he investigated the impact of regional anti-racism legislation on the anti-racist movement in the UK.

== Publications ==
- Pipe Dream Blues: Racism and the War on Drugs (1991)
- The Struggle for Equal Education: the African-American Experience (1992)
- African Americans at the Crossroads: The Restructuring of Black Leadership and the 1992 Elections (1994)
- No Easy Victories: A History of Black Elected Officials (1997)
- Race in the Global Era: African Americans at the Millennium (1997)
- Hitler’s Black Victims: The Experiences of Afro-Germans, Africans, Afro-Europeans and African Americans During the Nazi Era (Routledge, 2002)
- Colin Powell and Condoleezza Rice: Foreign Policy, Race, and the New American Century (Praeger, 2006)
- The Black History of the White House (City Lights Publishers, 2010) ISBN 978-0-87286-532-7.
- Twenty Dollars and Change: Harriet Tubman and the Ongoing Fight for Racial Justice and Democracy (City Lights Publishers, 2022) ISBN 9780872868854
