= Chicago Eagle =

American newspaper

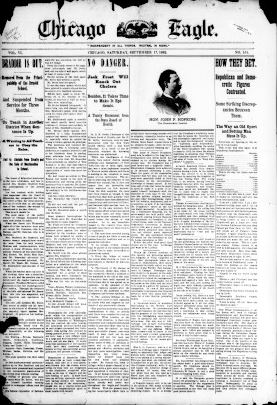
- Type: Weekly newspaper
- Format: Broadsheet
- Owner: Henry Donovan Company
- Founded: 1889-1912
- Headquarters: Chicago, Illinois

The Chicago Eagle was a newspaper from Chicago, Illinois, founded by publisher/editor Henry Donovan. The newspaper was originally published weekly on Saturdays, but changed its frequency to monthly in September 1944.

The Chicago Eagle lived up to the slogan printed under its masthead: "Independent in all things, neutral in none." Its publisher's concerns and interests lay more in the day-to-day lives of his readers than cultivating political friendships: "Donovan campaigned relentlessly against graft and corruption in local and state government, with a particular emphasis on working conditions in the department stores; the meat-packing industry; the emerging telecommunications monopoly; election fraud; bribery of public officials; and public safety issues."

It is not known when the Chicago Eagle ceased publication, but the latest known issue is dated November 1946.
