= 2026 White House shooting =

2026 White House shooting may refer to:

- 2026 White House Correspondents' Dinner shooting, an incident that occurred on April 25, 2026, at the Washington Hilton in Washington, D.C.
- May 2026 White House shooting, an incident that occurred on May 23, 2026, outside the White House grounds
