= Saimo Chahal =

British lawyer

Saimo Chahal KC (hon) is a British lawyer specialising in human rights. She was formerly joint head of the public law and human rights team at Bindmans LLP, in London.

== Education and personal life ==
Chahal was born in Punjab, India. She attended primary school in Twickenham and the Kneller Girls' School. She has a BA in sociology from the University of Sussex. She qualified in law in 1990, joined Bindmans LLP in 1993 and became a partner in 1995. Chahal is married to Stephen Pierce and they have two children, a daughter Asta Chahal-Pierce, and a son Jamie Chahal-Pierce.

== Career ==
Chahal first came to the attention of the press when she was interviewed by the Guardian (22 Sept 1990) as the supervising solicitor at Battersea Law Centre because Wandsworth council with the lowest poll tax in the country had decided to axe the Law Centre’s funding.

=== Cases – right to die with dignity ===
At Bindmans LLP Chahal has worked on many high-profile and cutting edge cases involving right-to-die campaigners, including Tony Nicklinson, Omid T, and Phil Newby.

=== Debbie Purdy ===
She acted for Debbie Purdy, a campaigner for assisted dying, whose case went to the Supreme Court in July 2009, where in a landmark victory the DPP was obliged to formulate guidance to Crown Prosecutors on how they would decide whether to prosecute or not in cases of those helping their loved ones to die. This was the last judgment of the House of Lords before if rose to sit as the newly formed Supreme Court and the painting The Last Judgment hangs in the dining room of the Supreme Court justices. Chahal appears in the book written by Debbie Purdy who describes the first meeting with Chahal in, It's Not because I want to Die.

Chahal appeared on BBC Radio 4's 2019 Test Case: The Legacy of Debbie Purdy, to discuss Purdy's case with professor Deborah Bowman, Purdy's husband Omar Puente, and barrister and peer Charlie Falconer, and Omid T. who travelled to Switzerland for an assisted death in October 2018 while waiting for the courts to consider his case seeking "a declaration under Section 4 (2) of the Human Rights Act that Section 2 (1) of the Suicide Act 1961 which makes assisting in a suicide a criminal offence is incompatible with his rights under Article 8 of the European Convention on Human Rights".

=== Tony Nicklinson ===
Chahal worked on Nicklinson’s case. Nicklinson, a then 56 year old from Wiltshire, a father of two daughters, suffered a stroke in 2005, which left him almost totally paralysed, only able to move his eyes and head. While Nicklinson was able to make an informed, and fully consensual decision to end his life, his disabilities meant that he could not take his life unassisted, meaning anyone who helped him would face a murder charge.

=== Savage ===
In a widely reported case Chahal acted for Anna Savage whose mother jumped in front of a train whilst a detained patient. Chahal devised a novel challenge under the Human Rights Act arguing violation of her right to life under Art2 ECHR. The Trust argued that it would open the flood gates to claims.

=== Yorkshire Ripper ===
Chahal represented the "Yorkshire Ripper" Peter Sutcliffe in his appeal to have a tariff, or minimum term, set for his sentence, and received hate-mail and negative media coverage. In response she said "If I wasn't the person I am I would have asked myself why I took that case on — but I felt I was doing my job as a lawyer. Peter Sutcliffe is entitled to good legal representation as much as anyone else. It is a fundamental right enshrined in our legal system. My job is to do the best I can and not to be bullied and distracted from that course." A journalist Fiona Bawden responded by writing an article about Chahal's unfair treatment by the Tabloids, in Trial by Tabloid for Ripper's Lawyer.

=== Junior doctors ===
In 2016 Chahal represented five junior doctors in their judicial review claim against the Secretary for State for Health, who was attempting to impose a new contract on Junior Doctors which would adversely affect doctors' pay and working conditions. Dr White, Dr McVeigh, Dr. Masood, Dr. Silman and Dr. Mashru, the junior doctors who founded the company Justice for Health Ltd, instructed Chahal in February 2016 immediately after Jeremy Hunt had announced a "decision to impose a contract on the junior doctors".

=== Other notable cases ===
Chahal represented a mother taking action against a doctor who circumcised her son at the father's request without the mother's consent, and represented Michael Sandford, a British man with autism arrested after trying to take a policeman's gun at a Donald Trump rally.

Chahal was selected to form part of a legal panel representing three of the most powerful human rights law firms assembled by Times Law in a bid to help secure the release of the well known Chinese artist, Ai Weiwei from prison.

Chahal acted for Alhammad in 1997 and won a landmark victory against the Welcome Trust the landlord in a housing case in the court of Appeal which reversed an earlier ruling and gave protection back to hundreds of tenants where tenants had lost protection when a leaseholder surrenders his/her tenancy.

Chahal successfully prevented a Serious Crime Prevention Order against Michael Steven Sandford, a British citizen who attempted to shoot Donald Trump during his presidential campaign in June 2016 and was changed with disorderly conduct and with being an "illegal alien in possession of a firearm" serving a 12 months and one day prison sentence in Nevada, the UK Crown Prosecution Service sought a Serious Crime Prevention Order against Sandford on the basis that he posed a "serious risk" to Trump, seeking to curtail his activities during the time of the visit yet Chahal evidenced that the legal test could not be met, resulting in the claim being dismissed.

== Recognition ==
She was appointed Queen's Counsel (honoris causa) in 2014. This distinction given to lawyers "recognises their pioneering contribution to the law of England and Wales outside of practice in the courts". In Chahal's case it was awarded "for her innovative use of the Human Rights Act to help ordinary people, often vulnerable, to achieve success before the highest courts in what many would have considered unarguable cases or would have been unwilling to take".

- March 2018: Chahal was appointed an Associate Fellow, Centre for Public Law, University of Cambridge
- February 2016: Chahal was listed in the Thompson Reuter's Top 100 Super Lawyers List, Public & Admin Law
- January 2016: Chahal was listed in the Black Lawyers Directory in the first ever "Movers and Shakers" list of the most influential and powerful black lawyers
- March 2012: Chahal was listed in The Times Law 100 chosen from the nation's 150,000 judges and lawyers as one of the most influential 100 lawyers in society
- May 2011: Chahal was Public Law and Human Rights Lawyer of the Year by the Society of Asian Lawyers
- 2008: Chahal was named the Law Society's Solicitor of the Year.
- Oct 2006: Chahal was Legal Aid Lawyer of the Year- Mental Health, for constantly pushing the boundaries of the law on behalf of those with mental illness and the vulnerable

In 2008 the Guardian's Afua Hirsch noted that Saimo had 'built a career on helping people turn disadvantage into pioneering litigation, a record that won her the legal profession's highest accolade... Law Society Solicitor of the Year.'
