= Debbie Purdy =

British music journalist and political activist

- Born: 4 May 1963
- Died: 23 December 2014 (aged 51)
- Occupation: Musical journalist

Debbie Purdy (4 May 1963 – 23 December 2014) was a British music journalist and political activist from Bradford, West Yorkshire. After being diagnosed with primary progressive multiple sclerosis, she challenged the law in England and Wales regarding assisted suicide. In 2009, revised guidelines on assisted suicide law were published by the UK Government following Purdy's campaign.

== Purdy's case ==
Debbie Purdy and her counsel David Pannick QC argued that the Director of Public Prosecutions (Ken Macdonald QC) was infringing on her human rights by failing to clarify how the Suicide Act 1961 is enforced. The DPP counsel took the position that the law does not require the DPP to make any further clarification of the Act: they argued that the Act and further information contained in the Code for Crown Prosecutors provided sufficient information.

Purdy's particular concern was to know whether any actions her husband, Omar Puente, took in assisting her suicide would lead to his prosecution. The penalty for those who "aid, abet, counsel or procure the suicide of another" is up to 14 years in prison. No family member of the 92 Britons who have gone abroad for an assisted suicide had been prosecuted at that time, but some had been charged and later had the charges dropped. Purdy said that if her husband would be exposed to prosecution for helping her travel to Switzerland to a Dignitas clinic to die, she would make the journey sooner whilst she was able to travel unassisted. This would save her husband from exposure to the law but would have forced Purdy to make her decision on dying before she felt it was absolutely necessary.

The hearing began on 2 October 2008 at the High Court of Justice. In court the DPP said that Purdy could not be given any reassurance that her husband would not be prosecuted as the law was clear that assisting suicide is an offence.

On 10 December 2008 Sky TV broadcast a programme on which a man with motor neurone disease was shown committing suicide with assistance. There had also been the case of 23-year-old Daniel James, who went to Switzerland with the aid of his parents after being paralysed whilst playing rugby, in which the Department of Public Prosecutions determined that to prosecute the parents would be against the public interest. These two events led to the issue of assisted suicide making the first story on the BBC's Newsnight. Purdy appeared on the programme to debate the issue. She denied that it is society that makes disabled people wish to kill themselves and reasserted her belief that it is right to be able to seek assistance when one is physically incapable of committing suicide oneself.

== Personal life ==
Purdy met her husband Omar Puente in Singapore when he was playing with a band, and they married in 1998. She was diagnosed with multiple sclerosis after she found her feet felt heavy when out dancing. She later used a wheelchair for mobility and both her sight and hearing began to deteriorate. Purdy entered the Marie Curie Hospice in Bradford in June 2013 and in December 2013 she began to intermittently refuse food. She described the length of time it was taking to die as "agonising". Purdy died on 23 December 2014, aged 51.

== Book and radio play ==
Purdy wrote a memoir entitled It's Not Because I Want to Die (2010, HarperTrue: ISBN 978-0007357987). On 26 February 2019 BBC Radio 4 broadcast Joy Wilkinson's dramatisation of Purdy's book, as Test case: Debbie Purdy. It was followed by a discussion, Test Case: The Legacy of Debbie Purdy, between professor Deborah Bowman, Purdy's husband Omar Puente, her lawyer Saimo Chahal QC, and barrister and peer Charlie Falconer.

== See also ==
- Assisted suicide in the United Kingdom
- Euthanasia
- Diane Pretty
