= 2016 Donald Trump Las Vegas rally incident =

Failed pistol grab in Nevada, United States

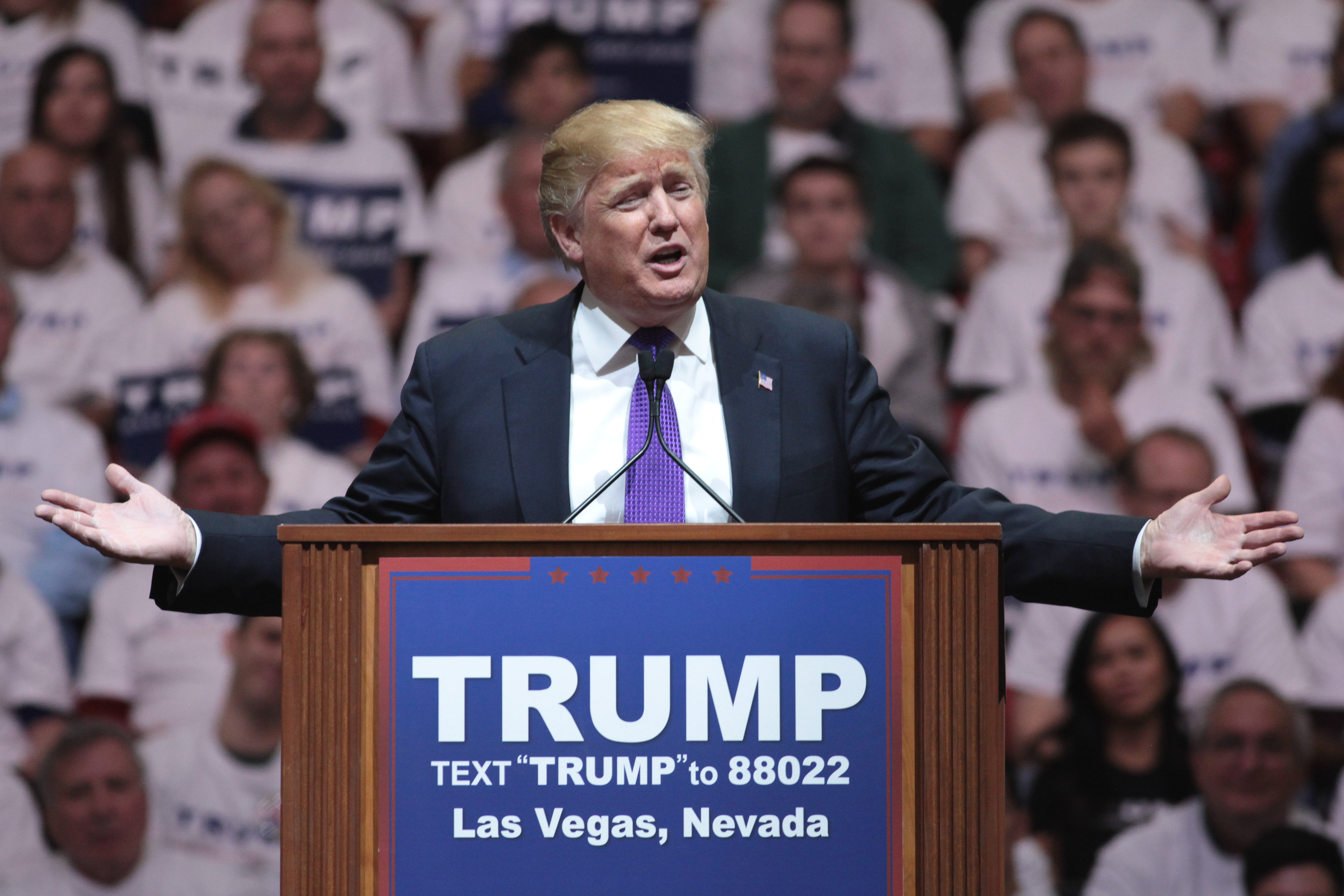
- Donald Trump addressing rally attendees in Enterprise, Nevada, in February 2016
- Location: 36°07′29″N 115°10′19″W; Mystère Theatre, Treasure Island Hotel and Casino, Paradise, Nevada, United States
- Date: June 18, 2016; 10 years ago 11:35 am (Pacific)
- Target: Donald Trump
- Attack type: Security incident involving Donald Trump
- Weapon: Glock 17 semi-automatic pistol
- Deaths: 0
- Injuries: 0
- Perpetrator: Michael Steven Sandford
- Motive: Prevent Trump from winning the 2016 presidential election and becoming president
- Convictions: Disorderly conduct; Unlawful possession of a firearm
- Criminal information
- Penalty: 12 months and one day imprisonment (released and deported after 11 months)

On June 18, 2016, at a rally for Donald Trump's 2016 United States presidential campaign in Paradise, Nevada, Michael Steven Sandford, a 20-year-old British citizen, attempted to grab the service pistol of a Las Vegas Metropolitan Police officer providing security for the event. Having failed to do so and having been arrested, Sandford claimed that he had wished to kill Trump to prevent him from being elected U.S. president.

Sandford was only charged with disorderly conduct and with being an "illegal alien in possession of a firearm" (for having previously rented a pistol at a shooting range). On September 13, 2016, he pleaded guilty to both charges. Sandford was sentenced to 12 months and 1 day of imprisonment, and was released and deported to the United Kingdom after 11 months in custody.

Sandford had a history of mental disorders, and the incident prompted criticism of mental health care in the United Kingdom. While the incident did not receive sustained media coverage in the United States, it was the subject of a documentary commissioned by the BBC in February 2017.

== Background ==
Sandford, aged 20, traveled from his home in Dorking, Surrey, United Kingdom, to the United States for an extended California vacation in early 2015. In June 2016, he acquired a ticket for the Trump campaign event, also reserving a ticket for a rally to be held in Phoenix, Arizona, later the same day.

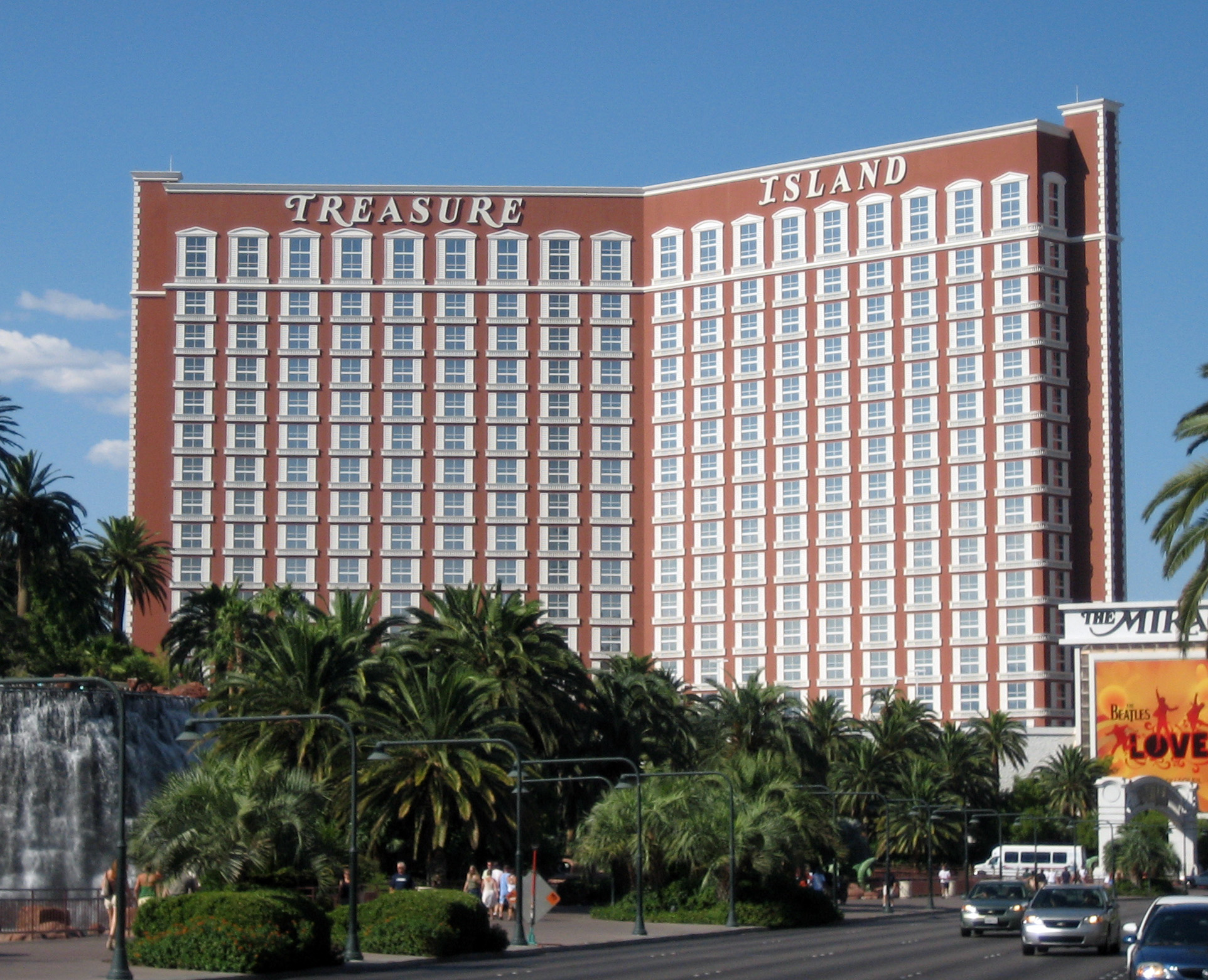
The Treasure Island Hotel and Casino, the scene of the incident

On June 16, 2016, Sandford drove to Las Vegas, where he visited the shooting range Battlefield Vegas for instruction and practiced shooting a rented 9mm Glock 17 pistol. This was the first time Sandford had fired a gun; the range safety officer who assisted him described him as "not a good shot". Because Sandford had overstayed his visa, the rental of a firearm to him was illegal.

On the evening of June 17, Sandford joined a queue at the Treasure Island Hotel and Casino for the following day's rally. At 9:00 am the following morning, the approximately 1,500 rally attendees were allowed into the Mystère Theater. The event was under the protection of the United States Secret Service, and magnetometers were used to detect any weapons brought into the venue.

== Incident ==
At 11:35 am, as Trump was speaking, Sandford noticed that Ameel Jacob, a police officer with the Las Vegas Metropolitan Police Department who was providing security for the event, appeared to have his Glock 17 pistol unlocked in its holster. Sandford approached Jacob, who was positioned approximately nine meters (30 feet) from the stage where Trump was speaking, and engaged him in conversation, saying that he wanted Trump's autograph. While talking to Jacob, Sandford "reached down to try and pull the officer's gun, but it got stuck in his holster". Sandford was immediately subdued and arrested by Jacob and two other police officers. Sandford was described as appearing "confused" at the time of his arrest.

After being taken into custody by the Las Vegas Metropolitan Police Department, Sandford was handed over to the United States Secret Service. After agreeing to waive his Miranda rights, Sandford was interrogated by two special agents, during which time he stated that his intent had been "to kill Trump", that "if he were on the street tomorrow, he would try this again", and that he had been planning the attempt "for about a year". Sandford also stated that he had only anticipated being able to fire "one to two" shots and that he had expected to have been killed.

== Subsequent legal proceedings ==
Following his arrest, Sandford was held in the Nevada Southern Detention Center. Due to his mental health conditions, Sandford was kept in solitary confinement and repeatedly put under suicide watch. On June 20, 2016, a complaint was filed with the United States District Court for the District of Nevada charging Sandford with committing an act of violence on restricted ground. Sandford appeared in a Nevada District Court on June 20, 2016, where he was charged with committing an act of violence on restricted ground. Sandford's public defender, Heather Fraley, argued that Sandford should be bailed to a halfway house given his lack of a criminal record, but he was denied bail by Magistrate Judge George Foley Jr. on the basis that he presented a flight risk and was a potential danger to the community. On June 29, a federal grand jury indicted Sandford on three felonies: two counts of being an "illegal alien in possession of a firearm" and one count of "impeding and disrupting the orderly conduct of government business and official functions". Each charge carried a maximum sentence of 10 years' imprisonment and a fine of $250,000. U.S. Immigration and Customs Enforcement also issued a detainer against Sandford relating to an immigration violation.

Sandford was arraigned on the three charges on July 7, 2016, pleading not guilty to each. His trial was set for August 22, 2016. The Sandford family's UK lawyer, Saimo Chahal of Bindmans, requested that the trial be adjourned to enable "psychological evidence and psychiatric evidence" to be submitted in favor of Sandford being repatriated to the UK to receive treatment for mental illness there. Subsequently, at the urging of his family, Sandford signed a plea agreement that reduced his maximum sentence from 20 years to 27 months and protected Sandford from any additional charges arising from the investigation while waiving Sandford's right to appeal. On September 13, 2016, Sandford pleaded guilty in the United States District Court for the District of Nevada to charges of being an illegal alien in possession of a firearm (this pertaining to the firearm he had on June 16, 2016, rented for practice at a shooting range) and impeding and disrupting the orderly conduct of government business and official functions, saying "I tried to take a gun from a policeman to shoot someone with, and I'm pleading guilty." A third charge of being an illegal alien in possession of a firearm was dropped. Sandford apologized for his actions, saying, "I know saying sorry is not enough. I really do feel awful about what I did. I wish there was some way to make things better. I have cost taxpayers so much money. I feel terrible." Sandford reported having no memory of the incident.

Sandford was sentenced at a hearing on December 13, 2016, receiving 12 months and one day's imprisonment. He was also fined US$200 and required to undertake a rehabilitation program. The sentencing judge, James C. Mahan, acknowledged Sandford's mental health issues, stating, "I don't think you harbored malice in your heart ... You have a medical problem ... I don't see you as evil or a sociopath." Mahan described the incident as a "goofy, crazy stunt" driven by "voices" Sandford thought he was hearing and instructed Sandford to "stay on your medication". Prosecutors had sought a sentence of 18 months.

Sandford served most of his sentence in the Nevada Southern Detention Center. He was repeatedly placed on suicide watch and stated that he was confined to his cell "most of the time". In January 2017, Sandford's mother stated that Sandford was being harassed by "Trump-supporting guards and inmates". In February 2017, Sandford was relocated to a different jail. Sandford became eligible for early release in April 2017; the following month, he was released from prison and deported to the United Kingdom.

In advance of Trump's first presidential trip to the UK in July 2018, the UK Crown Prosecution Service sought a Serious Crime Prevention Order against Sandford on the basis that he posed a "serious risk" to Trump, seeking to curtail his activities during the time of the visit. The Order was successfully opposed by Sandford's lawyer, who evidenced that the legal test could not be met, resulting in the claim being dismissed.

== Reaction and analysis ==
Trump briefly acknowledged the scuffle in his campaign speech, saying, "We love you, police. Thank you. Thank you, officers," as Sandford was led out of the arena. When Fox News interviewer Maria Bartiromo asked Trump about Sandford allegedly having overstayed his visa in the United States, Trump said, "Well, that's what's happening. I mean, look, we have no law, we have no order when it comes to many things. I mean, we're just talking about immigration," and speculated that there were "millions" of people in the United States who had overstayed their visas.

The incident received little coverage in the American media. Journalists and political commentators attributed this to its "feebly unsophisticated" and "poorly conceived" nature. They also suggested that Trump and his supporters declined to make political capital from the incident, as "a white British non-Muslim man did not fit his narrative of 'threat'". The Oregonian noted the short sentence given to Sandford, suggesting that "U.S. officials [...] apparently do not consider Sandford a threat." Writing in The Independent, Peter Walker was critical of the decision to incarcerate Sandford, opining "The autistic do not respond well to deterrents, and this is why [Sandford] should never have spent a single day in prison [...] if sentenced in the UK, I've no doubt this punishment would have recommended a hospital order or counseling."

The BBC produced a documentary about the incident and various issues concerning mental health and treatment of individuals affected by disorders. Titled The Brit Who Tried to Kill Trump, it aired on BBC Three on the BBC iPlayer, then on BBC One in the United Kingdom on January 29, 2017. The film was critical of mental health care in the UK, stating that "NHS resources [are] increasingly stretched by government cuts" and "There's also this difficult crossover period around 18 years old when someone passes from youth to adult services and people can get lost in the system."

== See also ==
- Security incidents involving Donald Trump
