= Omar Puente =

Cuban-born violinist and jazz musician (born 1961)

Omar Puente (born 1961) is a Cuban-born violinist and jazz musician, currently living in England. He has been called "a classical violinist with a heart that beats with a Cuban rhythm, a soul that is African, and a home in West Yorkshire".

== Background ==
Puente was born in Santiago de Cuba in 1961, during the Cuban revolution, to a mother who was a nurse and a father who was a doctor. He began learning the violin when he was five years old and studied at the Esteban Salas music school in Santiago. At the age of 12, he took up a scholarship to study classical music at the Escuela Nacional de Arte in Havana for six years. He went on to make a career as a classical musician, completing his formal higher education at the Instituto Superior de Arte, then joining the National Symphony Orchestra of Cuba (NSOC), in which he became first violin. Throughout this time he was also learning about popular Cuban music and jazz, from musicians such as Chucho Valdes and Arturo Sandoval, as well as playing in clubs, and after leaving the NSOC he toured the world in groups such as the José María Vitier band and the Orquesta Enrique Jorrín (with Ruben Gonzalez of the Buena Vista Social Club).

In Singapore in 1995, Omar met his English future wife Debbie Purdy, a music journalist, who soon after they met was diagnosed with multiple sclerosis. When she returned to the UK in 1997 for medical reasons, he came too. They married in 1998 and settled in Yorkshire. The story of their life together attracted headline attention in 2009 because of her legal challenge to the laws of assisted suicide, seeking assurance that if in the future she were to choose to go abroad to the Dignitas clinic in Switzerland to end her own life her husband would not be prosecuted for accompanying her. The House of Lords backed her appeal to have the law clarified. She died in 2014.

Since settling in England, Puente has taught Cuban music and jazz violin at Leeds College of Music, Trinity College of Music and World Heart Beat Music Academy, while maintaining his links with Cuban musicians. He has performed with Venezuela's Simón Bolivar Youth Orchestra, has composed music for a Carlos Acosta ballet, performed in London with Nigel Kennedy, Eddie Palmieri and the late Tito Puente (no relation), and collaborated on a jazz project with the Royal Philharmonic Orchestra. Among other well known musicians he has played with are guitarist John Williams, pianist Robert Mitchell, Jools Holland, Kirsty MacColl, Ibrahim Ferrer and Omara Portuondo. Puente is a regular member of the band of saxophonist Courtney Pine, who produced his debut solo album From There to Here (2009).

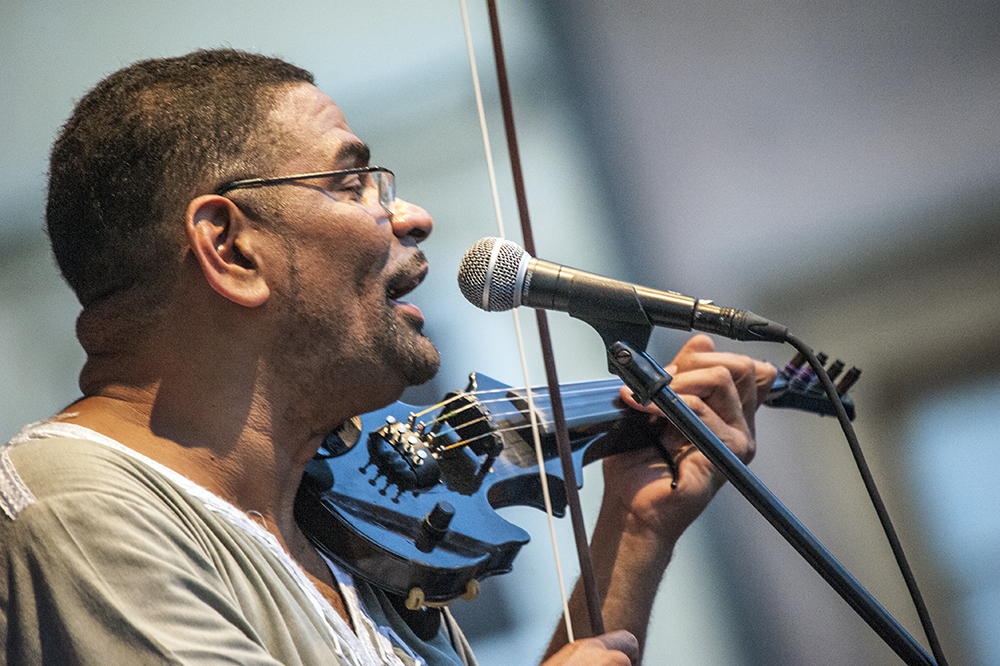
Omar Puente in an open-air performance in Warsaw, Poland - August 2011.

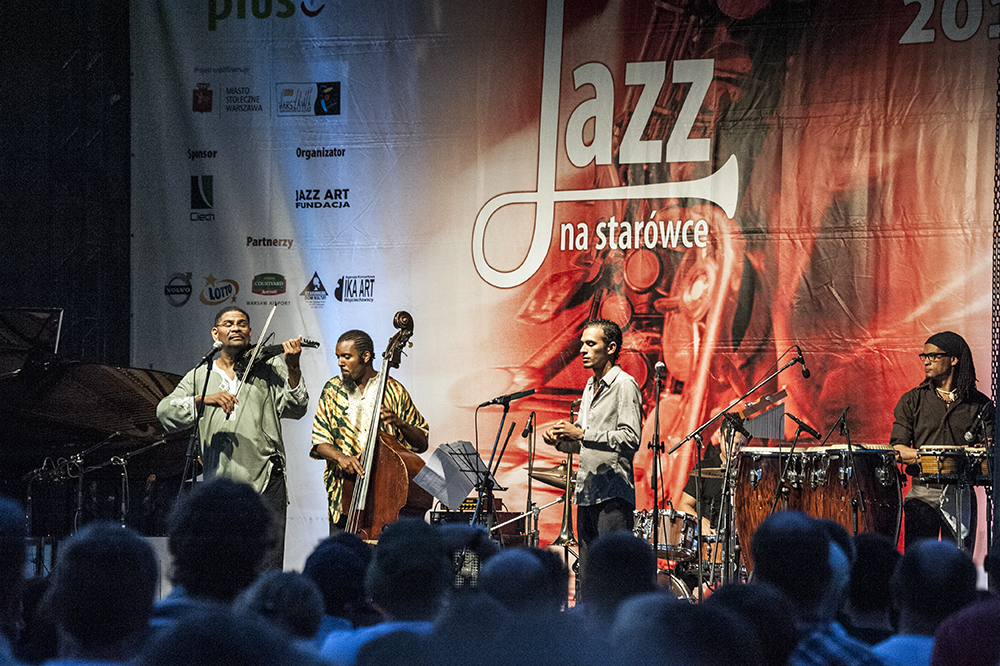
Omar Puente Sextet performing in Warsaw, Poland - August 2011.

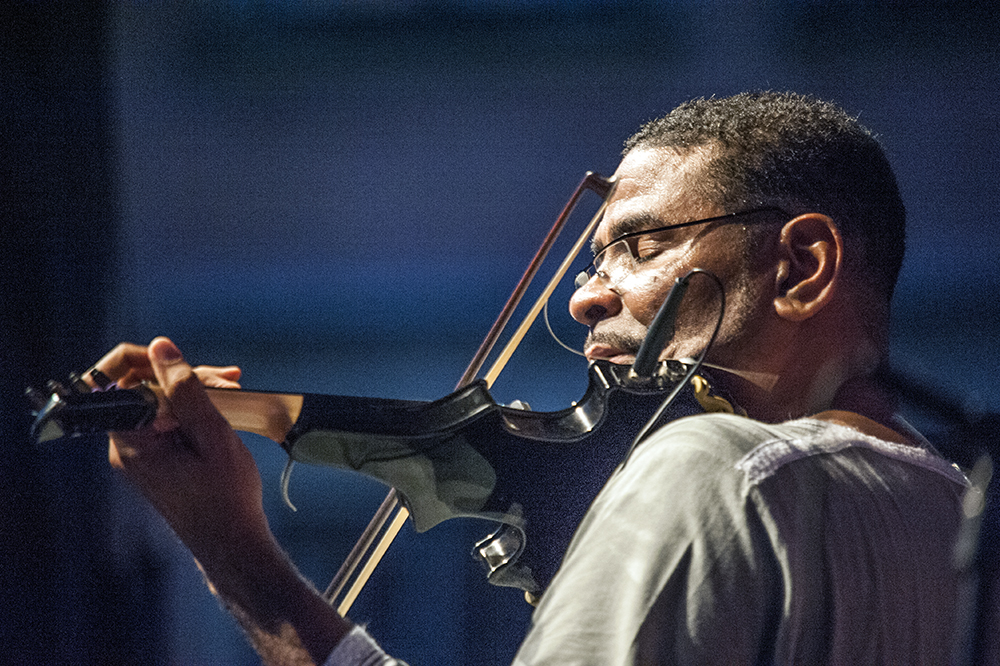
Cuban musician Omar Puente performing in the Old Town Square, Warsaw, Poland - August 2011.
