= Battlefield Vegas =

USA military museum and shooting range

- Battlefield Vegas logo

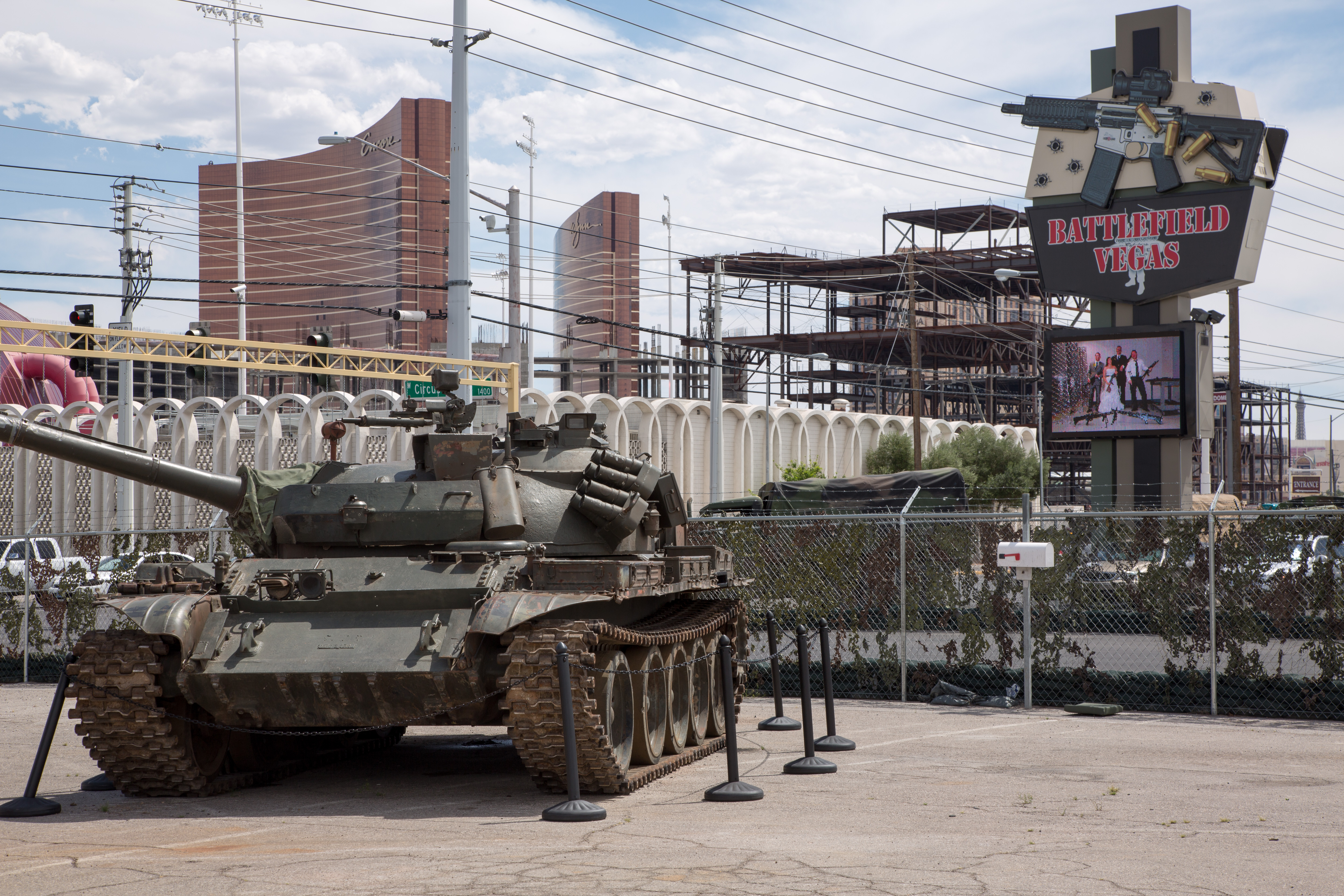
- A tank and the Battlefield Vegas sign on May 1, 2015
- Founded: October 1, 2012; 13 years ago
- Founders: David Famiglietti; Ron Cheney; Karla Cheney
- Headquarters: 2771 S Sammy Davis Jr Drive, Winchester, Nevada, United States; 36°08′20″N 115°10′07″W
- Owner: Henderson Defense Industries
- Number of employees: 68 (2016)
- Website: www.battlefieldvegas.com

Battlefield Vegas is an American shooting range and outdoor military museum located off the Las Vegas Strip in Winchester, Nevada. Founded by David Famiglietti, Ron Cheney, and Karla Cheney, the five-acre complex opened on October 1, 2012.

Battlefield Vegas has an 11-lane indoor shooting range and a 25-acre desert area for outdoor shooting. Primarily employing veterans, it owns a collection of about 750 firearms, 550 of which are automatic. The firearms were produced by nearly all member states of NATO and had been used in wars beginning from World War I. The museum showcases decommissioned tanks and helicopters in its yard. The company allows customers to maneuver a tank to crush a car. It sells shooting experiences named after and inspired by war films like Platoon and Saving Private Ryan and video games like Call of Duty's Black Ops and Modern Warfare series. Battlefield Vegas primarily caters to tourists instead of to locals.

== History ==
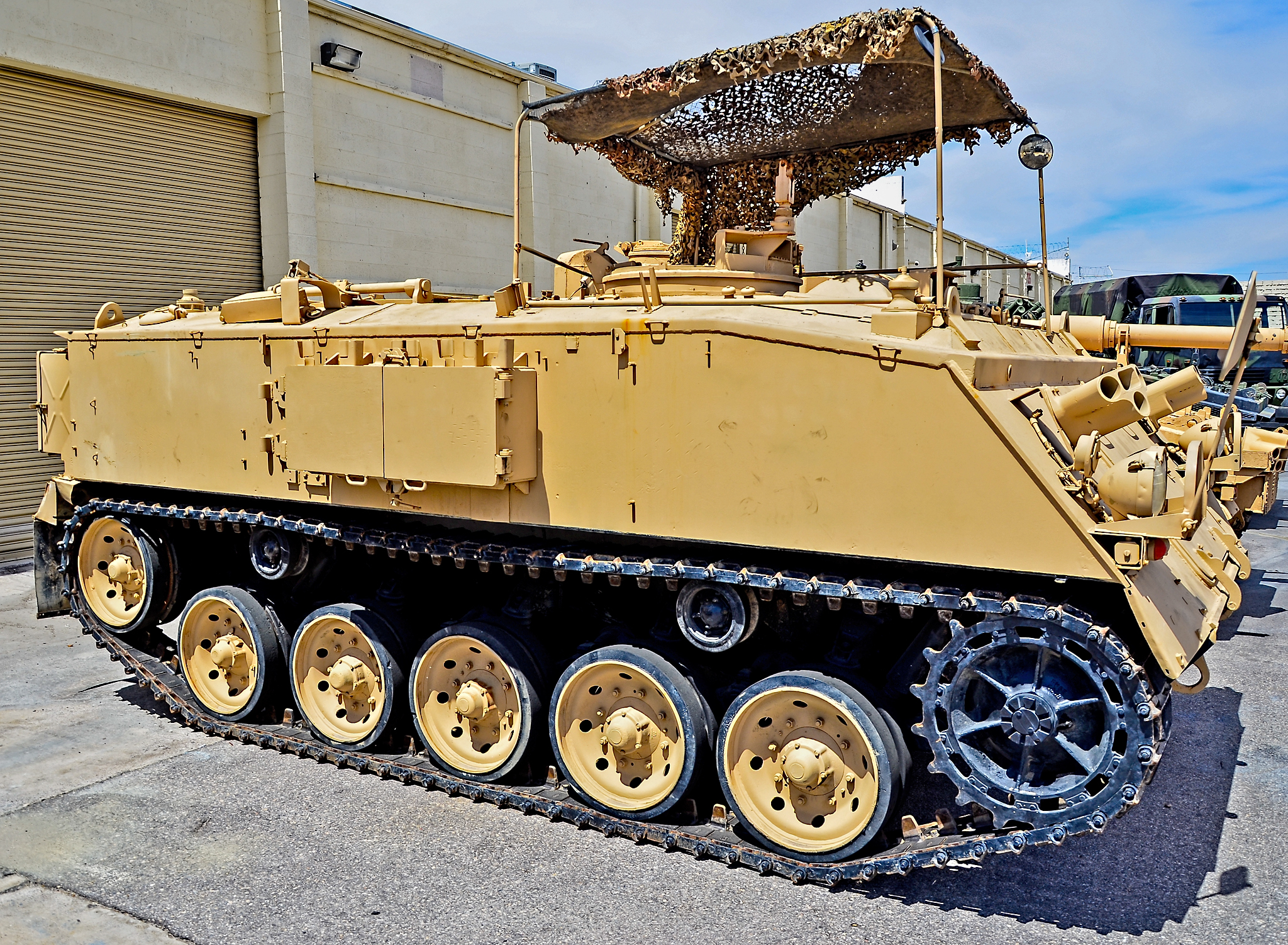
A British armored personnel carrier at Battlefield Vegas

Battlefield Vegas opened on October 1, 2012, following three years of planning and development. Founded by David Famiglietti, Ron Cheney, and Karla Cheney, the five-acre military-themed complex cost $2.5 million to build. Located off the Las Vegas Strip to its east, Battlefield Vegas is close to Circus Circus Las Vegas. Prior to founding the company, Cheney had been a chiropractor for 14 years and had served in the United States Army. His aim in establishing Battlefield Vegas was to give the community the opportunity to safely discharge firearms. In 2013, the company placed first in TripAdvisor's Traveler's Choice Award rankings for Las Vegas. In 2016, it had 68 employees, who were largely veterans. The employees wear military fatigues. Co-founder David Famiglietti died of cancer in 2019 at age 39. Battlefield Vegas belongs to and is run by Henderson Defense Industries, a limited liability company controlled by Ron and Karla Cheney.

In January 2013, Battlefield Vegas hosted a National Rifle Association lobbying session with 20 Nevada politicians. Participants included Democratic and Republican members of the Nevada Assembly and Nevada Senate as well as local Las Vegas and Clark County politicians. Assemblywoman Michele Fiore, who proposed a law to permit people with firearms licenses to carry a concealed firearm at schools, helped organize the event by inviting the 63 members of the Nevada Assembly and Senate to learn about firearms from the NRA. They attended lessons for three hours and went shooting for one hour. Roughly 36 protesters stood outside the complex to demonstrate against the NRA gathering and in support of gun control. On June 18, 2016, Michael Steven Sandford was arrested during a Donald Trump Las Vegas rally when he attempted to steal a police officer's firearm. Sandford, who had no prior experience with firing guns, received instructions at Battlefield Vegas on June 17 about how to wield a 9mm Glock, which he discharged 20 times at the range.

Several minutes after the 2017 Las Vegas shooting began, Battlefield Vegas co-founder Ron Cheney received a call from a sergeant in the Las Vegas Metropolitan Police Department requesting support. After recruiting 16 people, they drove four armored personnel carriers to Mandalay Bay to shield the police officers and remained there until 5:00 am. They did not know whether it was a terrorist attack and did not bring any firearms as they wanted to avoid startling the police officers. The group was the subject of multiple conspiracy theories following the shooting with some falsely speculating that they gave the shooter the firearms. After the shooting, the company established a team to respond quickly to future emergency events with each person given tasks to complete.

In November 2019, Diego Prado sued parent company Henderson Defense Industries after his 10-year-old daughter was "severely injured" on October 8, 2018, while holding a semi-automatic rifle at the gun range. Accusing Battlefield Vegas of negligence and requesting $15,000 to cover the girl's medical bills, the lawsuit said, "Despite assuring Plaintiff and her father that the employee would, at all the times, be in physical control of the rifle, the employee unexpectedly removed his hands from the rifle causing Plaintiff to lose control and drop the rifle which then discharged ammunition rounds."

Battlefield Vegas had a two-alarm fire just after noon on July 10, 2025. 63 employees from the Clark County Fire Department, Las Vegas Fire Department, and other agencies arrived to handle the fire, sending 10 engines, three trucks, and an aerial support team. Southwest Gas, NV Energy, and the Las Vegas Metropolitan Police Department assigned people to help. To make the situation better for any people in the building, firefighters climbed onto the roof to ventilate it. Battlefield Vegas updated its website to say, "Due to unforeseen circumstances Battlefield Vegas is currently closed." After undergoing renovations, it resumed operations on February 20, 2026.

== Shooting range and exhibits ==
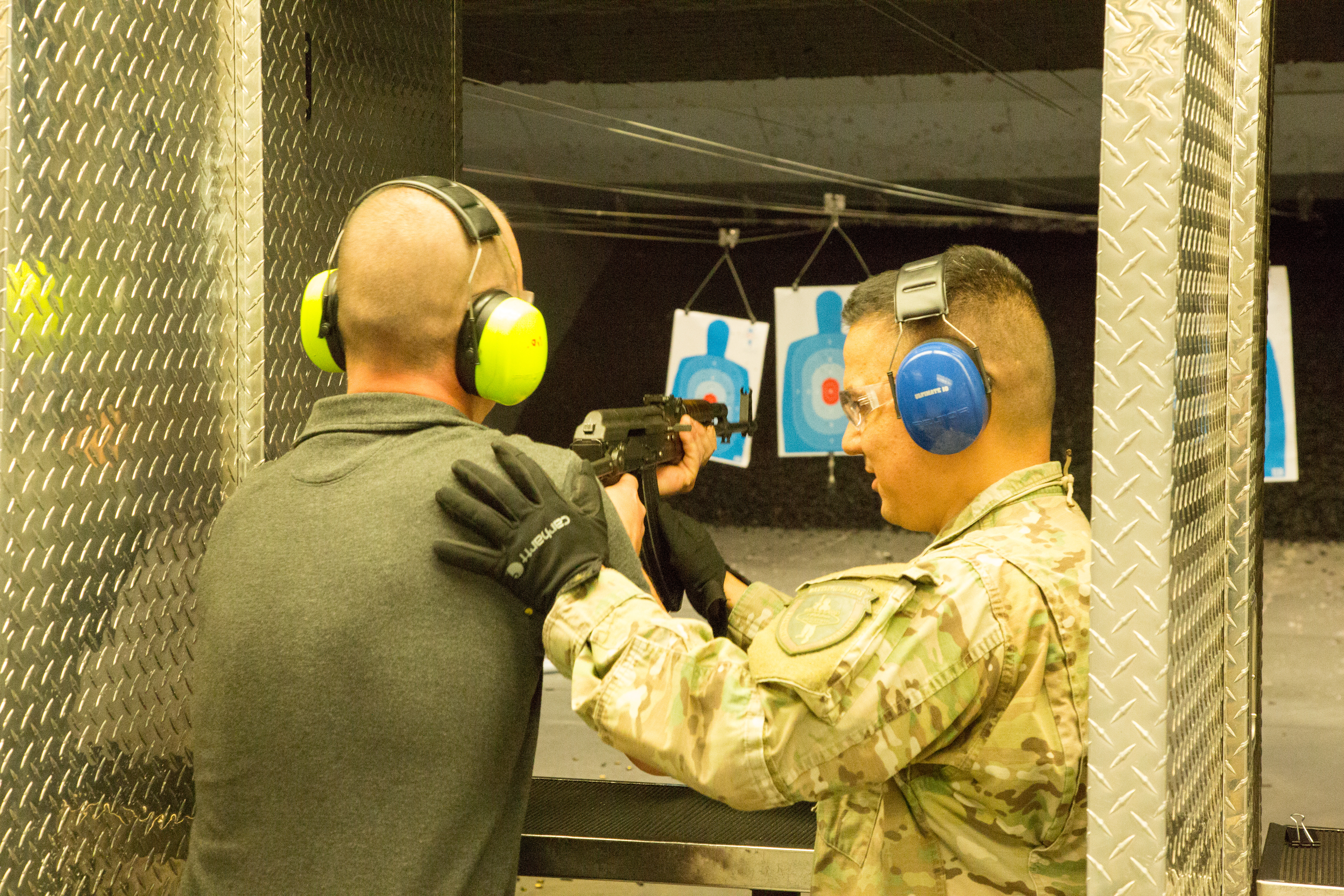
A man shooting an AK-47 at the gun range with the help of a range safety officer on May 1, 2015.

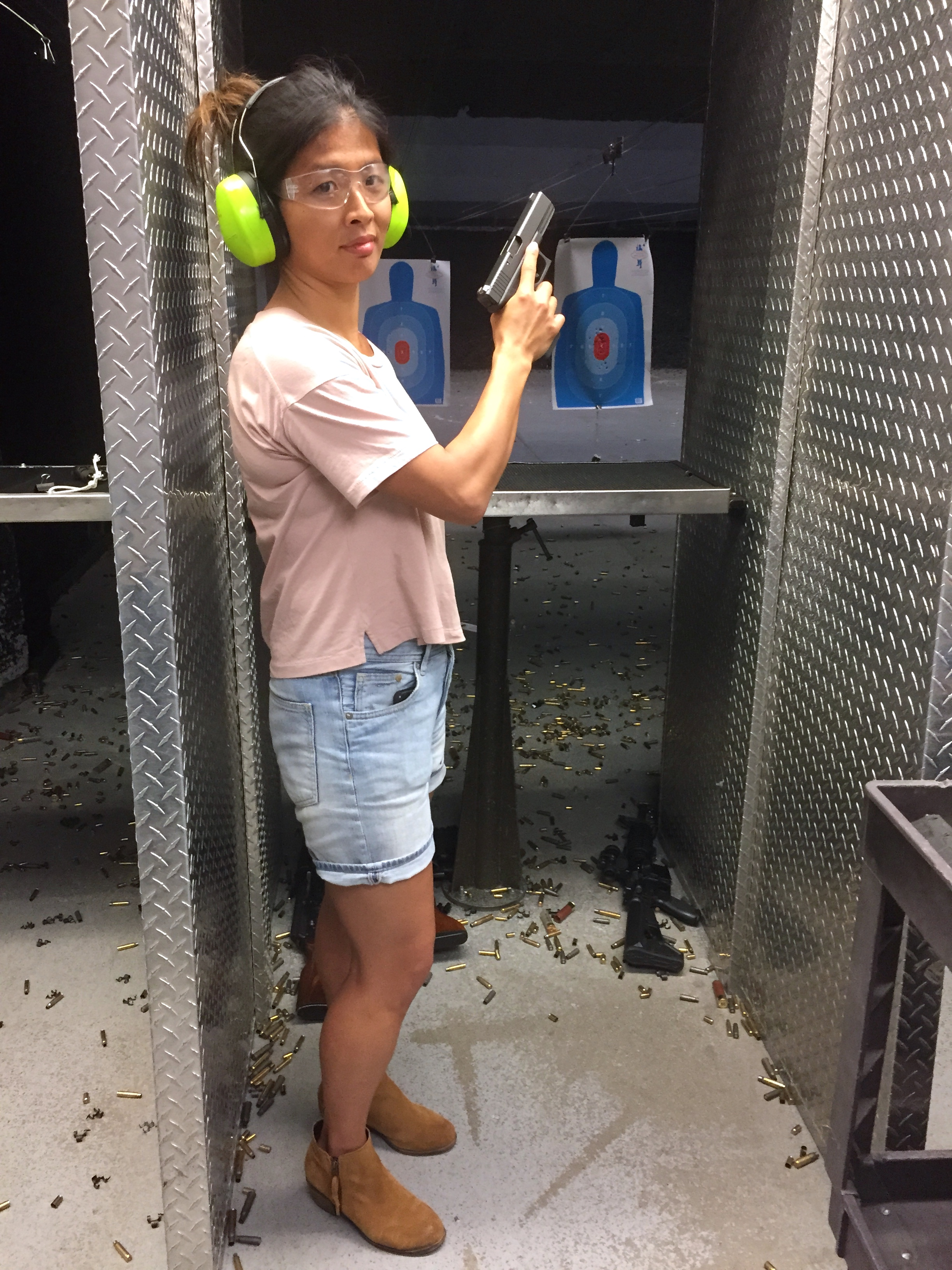
A woman holding a Glock 17 at the gun range on June 27, 2015

The Battlefield Vegas complex is surrounded by a chain-link fence wrapped in "shredded canvas" and containing barbed wire. Inside the fence are tanks, helicopters, and sandbags. It has a single-story structure with eaves decorated with images of guns. The building houses an indoor shooting range and a gift shop. The gift shop allows customers to purchase mementos such as guns, "toy grenades for ages 3 and up", T-shirts, and hats.

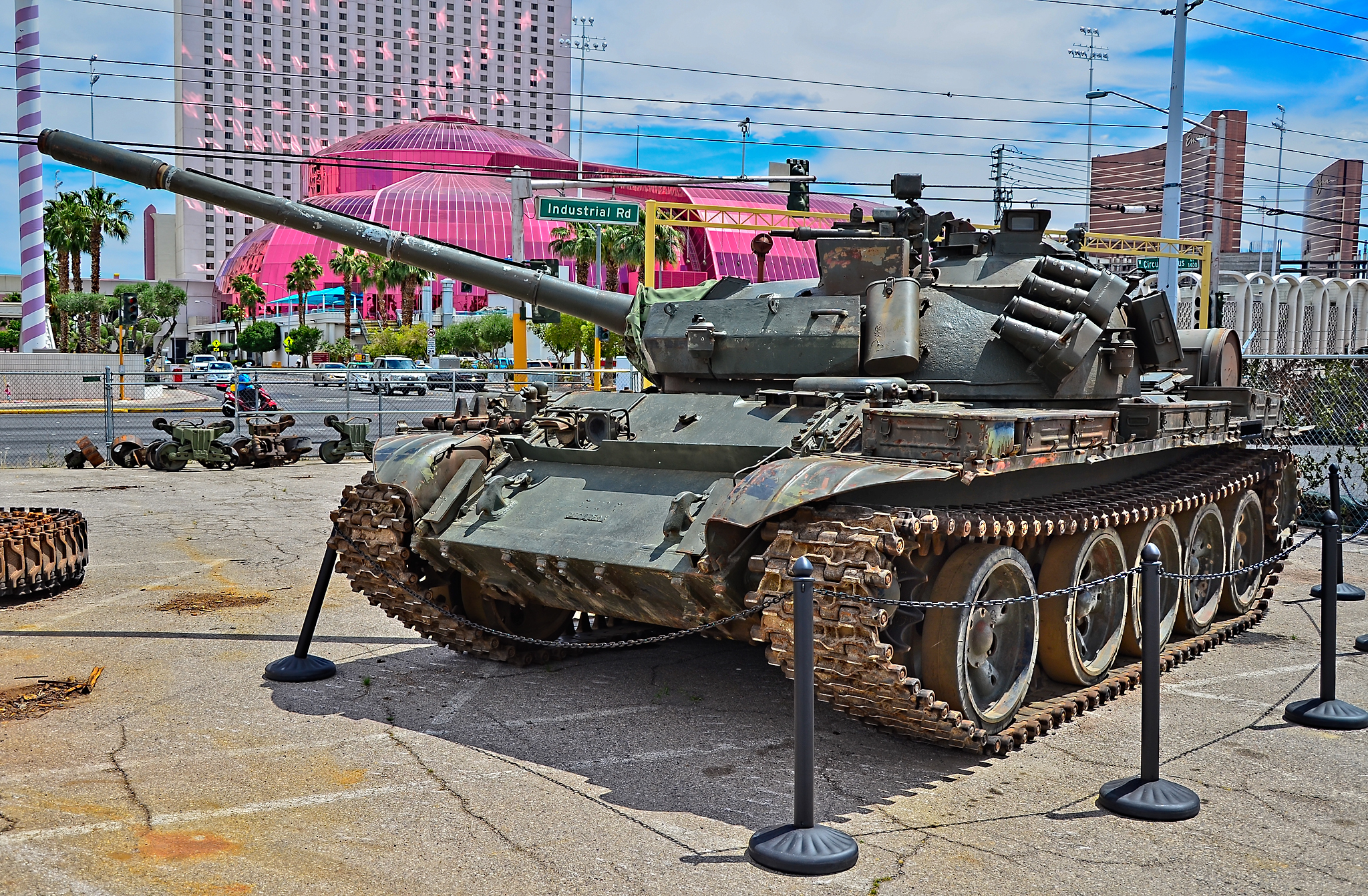
A T-55 tank at Battlefield Vegas

Using a Humvee, Battlefield Vegas transports visitors from their Las Vegas Strip hotels to the complex. It teaches visitors about the military history of the United States through exhibits, including a World War II tent set in North Africa, a Willys Jeep made in 1944, a Bell UH-1 Iroquois helicopter used during the Vietnam War, and eight M35 series 2½-ton 6×6 cargo trucks. The complex has a yard that the employees have christened "Petting Zoo", featuring numerous decommissioned military conveyances, particularly tanks. Penn Jillette rented a T-90 tank from the company in 2016 to demolish "The Slammer", the southwest Las Vegas house he purchased in 1994, for his independent film The Grounds. Battlefield Vegas has an assortment of machine guns of the same type that had been used by nearly all member states of NATO and in past wars including World War I, the War in Afghanistan, and the Iraq War. Seeded from co-founder Ron Cheney's private selection, the weapons number roughly 750. 550 of them are automatic firearms. Some of the firearms are privately made while some are fixed up.

Housing an indoor shooting range with 11 lanes, Battlefield Vegas is the largest Las Vegas indoor gun range. Customers aim at targets placed 25 yards (23 m) away. The company has a 25-acre desert area where visitors can do outdoor shooting. Prior to using the firearms, customers are informed about the regulations and must complete a waiver form. To get into the shooting range, they enter a pair of soundproof doors. When using the range, customers put on earmuffs for hearing protection and goggles for eye protection. They are accompanied by a range safety officer. After completing their shooting, visitors can keep what they shot as mementos.

The company sells a "crush a car with a tank" experience for $2,500 in which customers can steer an imitation M1 Abrams tank to crush a junkyard car. There are no safety lessons for the experience. Two employees assist the customer to raze the car: the first is seated in a backseat to give instructions and the second is outside to monitor and give advice. Armament experiences it offers bear the names of well-known military conflicts and events in which they had been used such as the Battle of Stalingrad, the Battle of Iwo Jima, and D-Day. Battlefield Vegas gave customers the option to use guns from war films like Platoon and Saving Private Ryan and from video games like Call of Duty's Black Ops and Modern Warfare series.

== Advertising ==
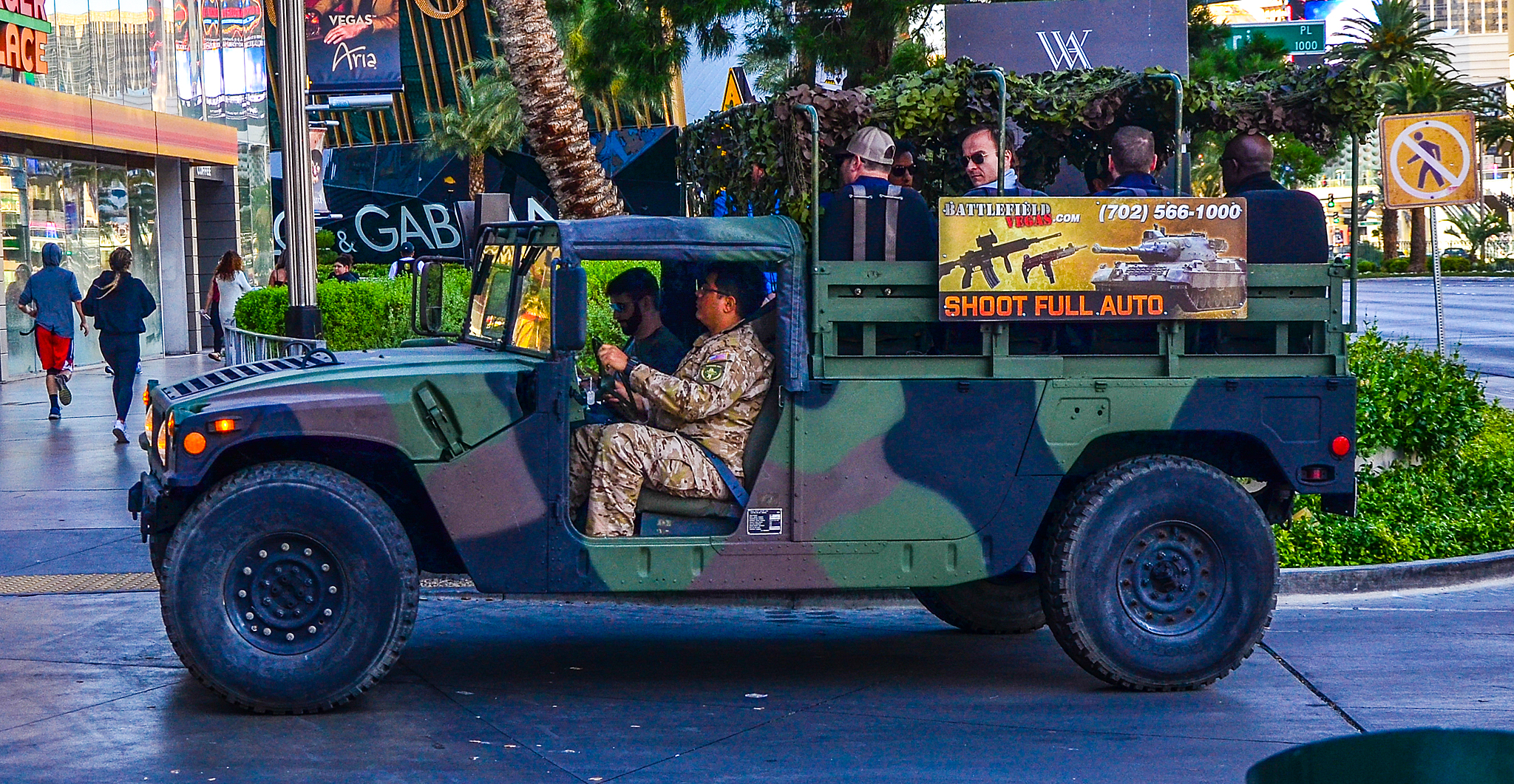
A Battlefield Vegas Humvee on May 21, 2021, advertising its services

The company advertises its services through a digital billboard truck with bright, flashing text. In its ads featuring visitors with military attire and bearing large firearms, Battlefield Vegas says, "More fire-power than your local armory. It's your new playground." Las Vegas residents said that in contrast to another gun range, The Range 702, Battlefield Vegas primarily caters to vacationers instead of locals.

The company rented a billboard operated by Lamar Advertising Company close to Interstate 15 and Spring Mountain Road to advertise its shooting range. The billboard, which said "Shoot a .50 Caliber Only $29", was vandalized on March 1, 2018 to read "Shoot a School Kid Only $29". Battlefield Vegas's phone number was covered with the text "Defend Lives Reform Laws". Indecline, an artist collective, posted a video showing two of its members vandalizing the sign and said their actions were in response to Stoneman Douglas High School shooting on February 14, 2018. Indecline released a statement explaining the vandalism, "This protest piece is in response to America's longstanding obsession with gun culture and our government’s inability to honor the victims of mass shootings by distancing themselves from the homicidal policies of the (National Rifle Association)." It targeted the Battlefield Vegas billboard despite there being nearby shooting range billboards "because of their aggressive name and location".

== Reception ==
In a January 2020 review of Battlefield Vegas gun range, the Toronto Sun's Adrienne Batra wrote, "Former military personnel guide users through a thrilling round that would make even the most timid shooter feel at ease." Geoff Carter of the Las Vegas Weekly said Battlefield Vegas "stands apart from other gun ranges. Everyone who works here has served in the military; many of the staffers are current reservists. ... firing a big gun is one thing; firing it under the guidance of people who handle this kind of ordinance (sic) for a living is something else entirely." He praised the company, writing, "Most of us haven't handled this equipment and probably never will, which is what makes BV such a fascinating place to visit. Things you've only seen on television and movie screens are suddenly given weight."

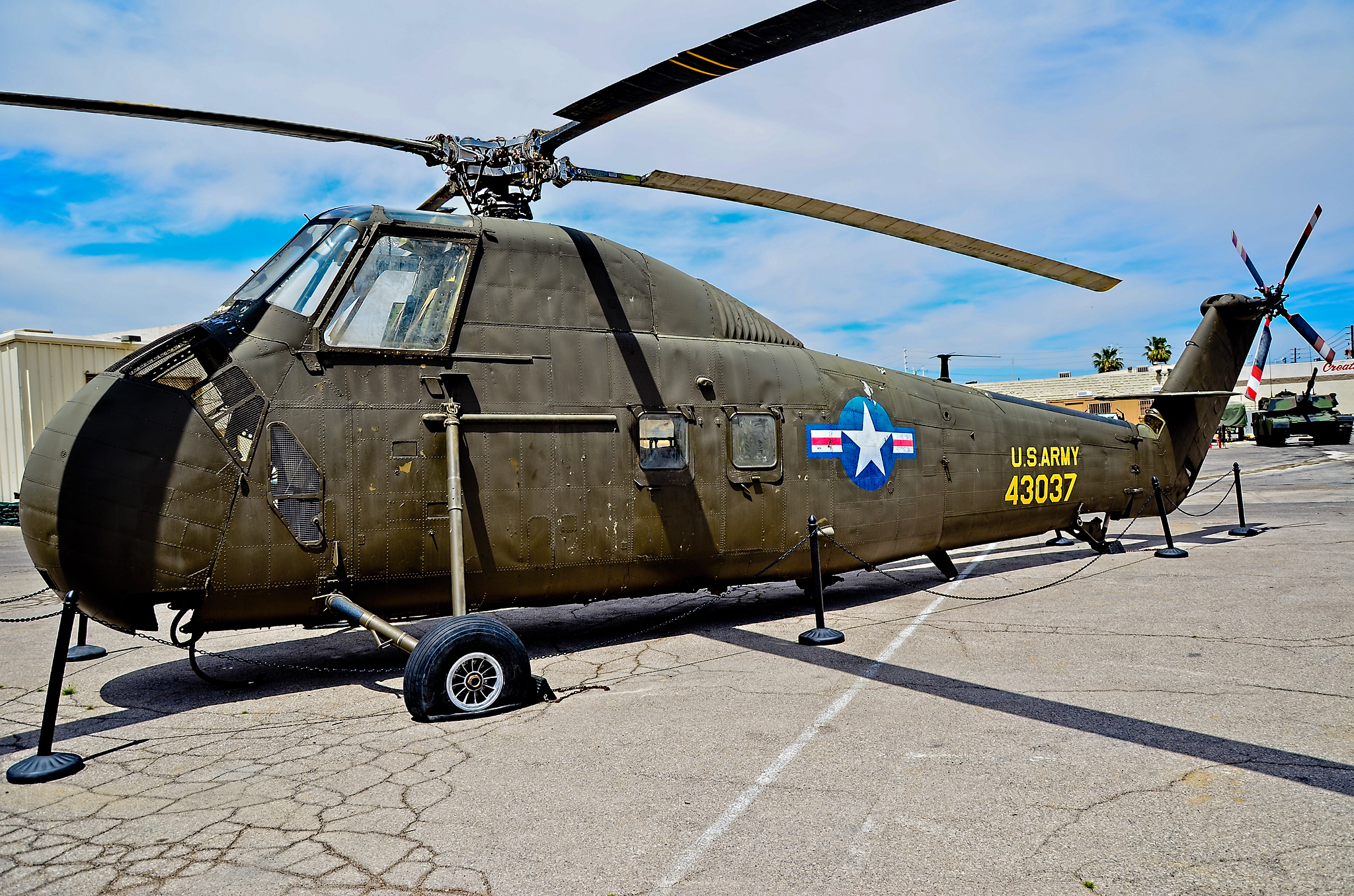
A Sikorsky H-34 helicopter at Battlefield Vegas
