= Security incidents involving Donald Trump =

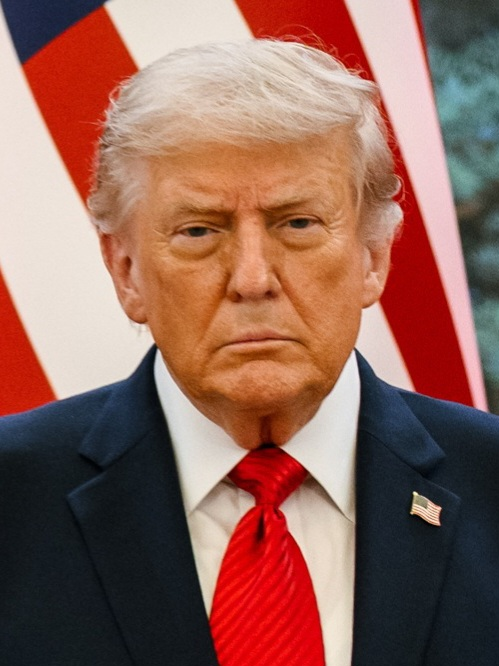
Trump in 2026

Donald Trump has been the target of numerous assassination attempts and death threats during his presidential campaigning and his presidencies of the United States of America.

The earliest known attempt occurred at a campaign rally in Las Vegas shortly before he secured the nomination of the Republican Party in the 2016 presidential election. Throughout Trump's first term in office, he was targeted but unharmed in several failed assassination attempts.

The most serious incident took place at a Pennsylvania campaign rally in 2024 while Trump was running for a second term. The attempt resulted in three deaths, that of the would-be assassin and two spectators. Trump was injured by a bullet that grazed his right ear, the only injury he sustained in these attempts.

== Incidents ==
=== Before 2024 ===
==== 2016 incident at Dayton, Ohio rally ====
On March 12, 2016, 22-year-old Thomas DiMassimo was arrested and charged with disorderly conduct as he broke over the police barricade and attempted to rush the stage during a rally in Dayton, Ohio. He was tackled by the Secret Service. On July 26, 2016, DiMassimo was sentenced to one year probation.

==== 2016 incident at Las Vegas rally ====
On June 18, 2016, Trump was giving a speech at the Treasure Island Hotel and Casino in Las Vegas, Nevada, as part of his presidential campaign. During the speech, Michael Steven Sandford, a 20-year-old British man, attempted to grab a Las Vegas Metropolitan Police officer's pistol. The officer quickly subdued Sandford, who was arrested and handed over to the United States Secret Service, where he expressed his desire to murder Trump. Sandford was sentenced to 12 months and one day's imprisonment, along with being fined $200. After becoming eligible for early release, Sandford was released and deported to the United Kingdom in May 2017.

==== 2016 Reno "gun" scare ====
On November 5, 2016, three days before the presidential election, Trump was speaking at a rally in Reno, Nevada, when a man in the crowd screamed "gun". This caused Trump to be rushed off stage by security, and the man was tackled by surrounding members of the crowd. The man, Austyn Crites, was subdued by Secret Service agents and searched, only to find that he was unarmed. Crites, a Republican who opposed Trump, was holding up a sign shortly before that stated "Republicans against Trump". Crites stated that others attempted to grab the sign and were booing him. After the scene was cleared and identified as safe, Trump returned to the stage minutes later and finished the speech without incident.

==== 2017 forklift attack attempt ====
On September 6, 2017, in Mandan, North Dakota, Gregory Lee Leingang stole a forklift from an oil refinery and attempted to drive it toward the presidential motorcade while Trump was visiting to rally public support. After the forklift became jammed within the refinery, he fled on foot and was arrested by the pursuing police. While interviewed in detention, Leingang admitted his intent to murder the president by flipping the presidential limousine with the stolen forklift, to the surprise of authorities, who had assumed he was stealing the vehicle for personal use. Leingang pleaded guilty to the attempted attack, stealing the forklift, related charges and several other unrelated crimes on the same day. Consequently, he was sentenced to 20 years in prison. His defense attorney noted a "serious psychiatric crisis".

==== 2018 ricin threats ====
On October 1, 2018, an envelope containing castor beans, initially incorrectly being identified as ricin, was sent to Trump before being discovered by mailing facilities. Several other letters were sent to the Pentagon, all of them labeled on the front with "Jack and the Missile Bean Stock Powder". Two days later on October 3, a 39-year-old Utah Navy veteran named William Clyde Allen III was arrested and charged with one count of mailing a threat against the president and five counts of mailing threatening communications to an officer or an employee of the United States. Allen pleaded not guilty to all charges. He was subsequently remanded for psychiatric evaluation and treatment, and the charges against him were dismissed on January 25, 2022.

==== 2020 escort from press briefing ====
On August 10, 2020, Trump was escorted from a press briefing by a Secret Service agent after an armed suspect was shot outside the White House fencing.

==== 2020 ricin poisoning attempt ====
On September 20, 2020, Pascale Cécile Véronique Ferrier was arrested in Buffalo, New York, while attempting to cross over the border to Canada. Ferrier, who is Canadian, wrote in a ricin-laced letter to Trump that he should drop out of the ongoing 2020 presidential election along with calling him an "ugly tyrant clown". She was charged with eight counts each of prohibitions with respect to biological weapons and making threats via interstate commerce and faced up to life in prison. On August 17, 2023, a US court sentenced Ferrier to nearly 22 years in prison.

=== 2024 ===
==== Assassination attempt in Butler, Pennsylvania ====
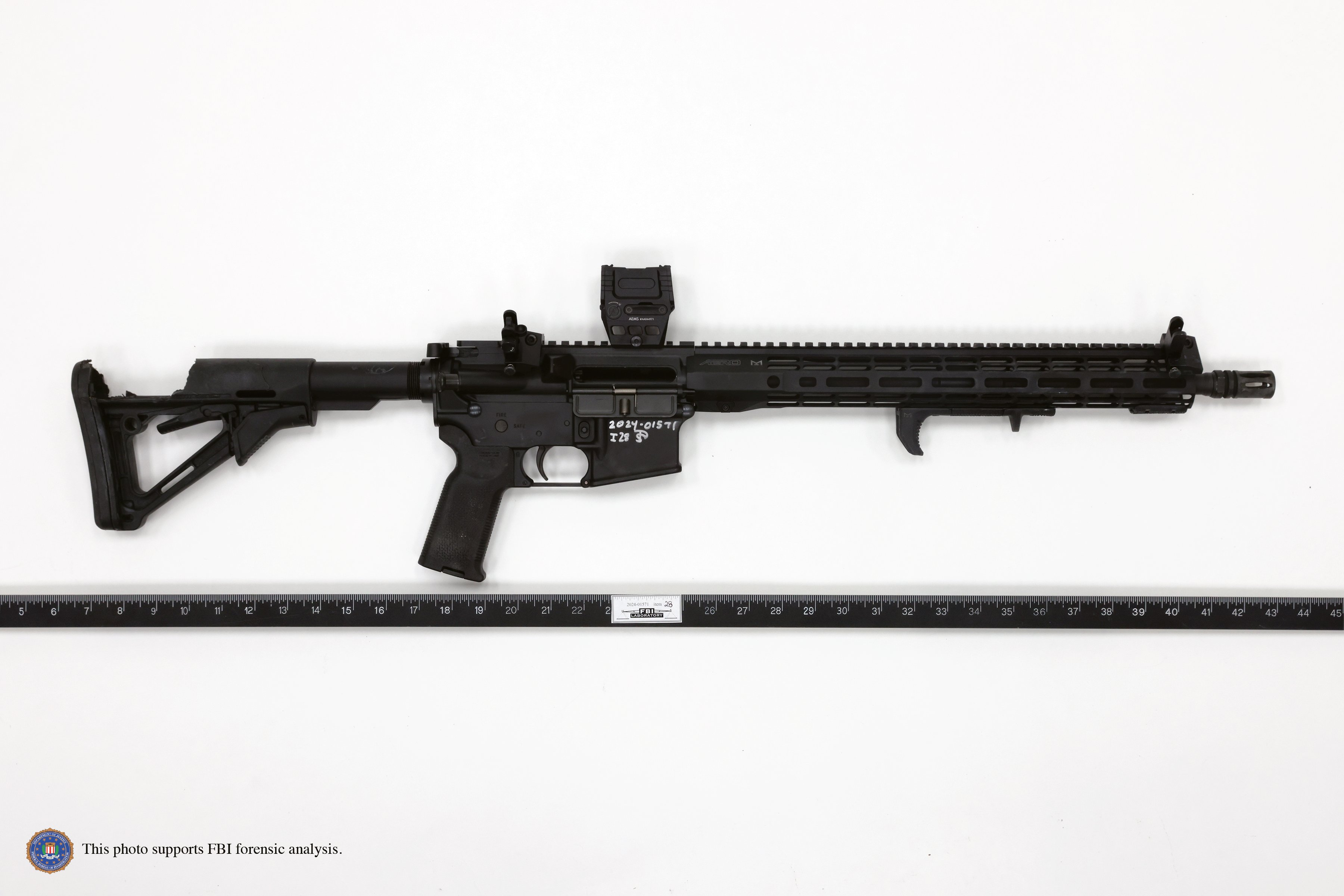
The rifle used by Crooks in the attempted assassination

On July 13, 2024, Thomas Crooks fired eight shots from an AR-15–style rifle at Trump while speaking at a rally near Butler, Pennsylvania. Trump was shot and wounded in his upper right ear before dropping to the ground and being shielded by the Secret Service. Crooks also killed two members of the audience, Corey Comperatore and James Copenhaver (the latter of whom died in 2026), as well as critically injuring one other, prior to being shot and killed by a member of the Secret Service Counter Sniper Team.

The assassination attempt prompted the resignation of the director of the Secret Service, Kimberly Cheatle, as well as several ongoing investigations into the incident as a political assassination attempt as well as an act of domestic terrorism.

==== Assassination attempt in West Palm Beach, Florida ====
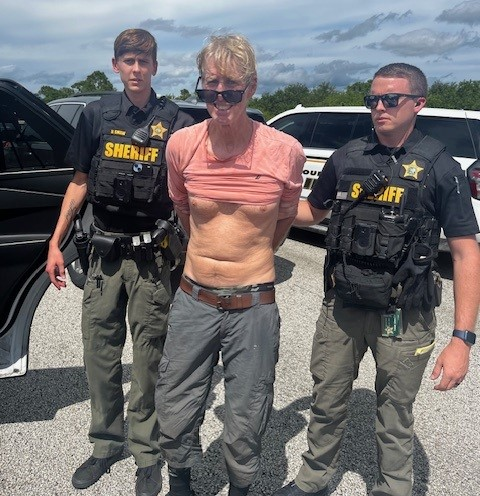
Routh being detained following the incident

On September 15, 2024, Ryan Routh was sighted wielding a rifle in bushes at the Trump International Golf Club in West Palm Beach, Florida, while Donald Trump was golfing at the club. A Secret Service officer shot at Routh, who fled, and was apprehended while driving away. The FBI was investigating it as an assassination attempt.

Authorities later confirmed that Routh did wish to kill the former president. An indictment on April 7, 2025, revealed that Routh was planning the assassination attempt as early as February 2024 with an accomplice who called himself "Ramiro", who lived in Mexico. Routh's trial began on September 8, 2025, and he was found guilty on all counts on September 23. He was sentenced to life in prison on February 4, 2026.

==== Security incident at Coachella rally ====
On October 12, 2024, a man was arrested near a checkpoint at a Donald Trump rally in Coachella, California. The man had two firearms and ammunition, multiple passports with different names, and an unregistered vehicle with a fake license plate. On the same day, he was released after posting a $5,000 bail.

==== Assassination attempts allegedly linked to Iran ====
According to a report by the United States Institute of Peace, "Iran has assassinated its enemies across four continents — in Asia, Europe, North America and South America — over the four decades since the 1979 revolution." Iran is said to have begun plotting against Trump's life following the assassination of Qasem Soleimani in 2020. In October 2024, the Biden administration warned Iran that the US would consider any retaliatory assassination attempts by Iran on Trump's life an act of war.

===== July 2024 arrest in Houston =====
On July 12, 2024, a Pakistani man with connections to Iran, Asif Merchant, was arrested in Houston and charged with recruiting people to help kill Trump, on behalf of Iran's Islamic Revolutionary Guard Corps (IRGC). One of the recruits turned into an informant for the FBI. On March 6, 2026, Merchant was convicted in New York City of murder for hire in the plot to kill Trump. Merchant testified that he participated unwillingly to protect his family in Tehran, whereas the Iranian government denied involvement.

===== November 2024 plot =====
On November 8, 2024, the U.S. Department of Justice charged Farhad Shakeri, an Afghan citizen, along with Carlisle Rivera and Jonathan Loadholt (whom Shakeri had met in a US prison) in connection with another murder-for-hire plot, as revenge for the killing of Soleimani. Shakeri allegedly told an undercover FBI agent that an IRGC official urged him to "set aside other efforts" to focus on Trump. Rivera and Loadholt were arrested in November 2024 and convicted on related charges in January 2026, whereas Shakeri remains at large.

=== 2025 ===
==== May death threat ====
On May 21, 2025, an Immigration and Customs Enforcement officer received a handwritten letter from someone claiming to be a Mexican immigrant threatening to shoot Trump with a hunting rifle at his next rally, offering to self-deport after Trump was killed. Ramon Morales Reyes, an undocumented immigrant from Mexico, was arrested the following day on suspicion of threatening the president. However, investigators soon concluded he could not have written the letter, as he did not speak English and the handwriting did not match. Prosecutors later charged Demetric Scott with witness intimidation after he admitted to writing the letter in an attempt to get Morales Reyes deported so that he could not testify against Scott in an upcoming robbery trial. Scott was convicted of witness intimidation and misappropriating another person's identity in January 2026. On February 27, he was sentenced to 16 years in prison.

==== June RCMP officer threat ====
On June 3, 2025, Royal Canadian Mounted Police (RCMP) officer Evenson Dumerlus posted a video to his Snapchat account in which he made unspecified threatening comments toward Trump. He was deployed at the time on security duty for the G7 summit in Kananaskis, Alberta, which Trump attended on June 15–17. A fellow officer reported the video, and Dumerlus was removed from his duties. On June 17, 2026, the RCMP announced that he had been charged with one count of uttering threats and was scheduled to appear at the St-Jean-sur-Richelieu courthouse on July 30, 2026.

==== August death threat ====
A 50-year-old woman from Indiana was arrested in the District of Columbia on August 16, 2025, and charged with making violent threats against Trump. An Instagram account attributed to the woman had posted intent to "sacrificially kill this POTUS by disemboweling him and cutting out his trachea with Liz Cheney and all The Affirmation present." The account also referred to Trump as a terrorist and expressed a desire to avenge deaths that occurred due to his administration's COVID-19 policies. During an interview with the Secret Service, she claimed to have a bladed object which she would use to kill Trump. On the day of her arrest, the woman "circumnavigated" the White House complex as part of a protest.

==== Security lapse at Trump National Golf Club ====
On August 31, 2025, a member of the Trump National Golf Club in Sterling, Virginia, inadvertently brought a loaded Glock handgun into the facility while Trump was present. The firearm passed undetected through a manual bag inspection and handheld magnetometer screening. The individual later self-reported the weapon to security staff, and the gun never came into close proximity to Trump. The United States Secret Service launched an internal review of the lapse, and the screening agent responsible was placed on administrative leave.

==== Ryder Cup impersonation incident ====
On September 26, 2025, an off-duty New York City Police Department officer who was armed gained unauthorized access to the Ryder Cup at Bethpage Black Course while Trump was present, falsely claiming to be part of his security detail. The officer, who was on sick leave and not assigned to the event, was later suspended pending investigation.

==== Air Force One security incident ====
On October 16, 2025, the United States Secret Service discovered a suspicious elevated hunting stand near Palm Beach International Airport in Florida with a direct line of sight toward the area where Air Force One was parked. The structure was found during a routine security sweep before Trump's arrival. No individuals were located at the site, but the FBI investigated whether the placement of the stand posed a potential threat. According to reports, the vantage point provided an unobstructed view of the aircraft due to temporary construction changes at the airport, though authorities stated that Trump's movements were not disrupted by the discovery.

=== 2026 ===
==== February Mar-a-Lago Secret Service shooting ====
On February 22, 2026, the United States Secret Service shot and killed Austin Tucker Martin, a 21-year-old man from Cameron, North Carolina, who was reportedly carrying a shotgun and gas canister onto the grounds of Mar-a-Lago, Trump's private residence in Florida. Trump was in Washington D.C. at the time of the incident.

==== March Mar-a-Lago no-fly zone violation ====
At around 1:15 p.m. on March 29, 2026, a civilian plane was intercepted by NORAD aircraft after it violated the Mar-a-Lago no-fly zone.

==== White House Correspondents' Dinner shooting ====
CCTV footage of the suspect running past the secure area near the ballroom

On April 25, 2026, gunshots were fired as an armed man ran past law enforcement at the Washington Hilton during the White House Correspondents' Dinner. Secret Service agents evacuated Trump and his wife Melania, Vice President JD Vance, and several cabinet members from the banquet hall. The suspect, 31-year-old Cole Tomas Allen of Torrance, California, was apprehended near the screening area outside the banquet hall. No officials were harmed. One officer was struck in his bullet-resistant vest and was hospitalized but later released. Allen was hospitalized for a knee injury from falling.

A manifesto that officials attributed to Allen criticized Trump administration policies and stated that he intended to target administration officials. The manifesto did not name Trump, but stated "I am no longer willing to permit a pedophile, rapist, and traitor to coat my hands with his crimes". Allen was charged with four criminal counts, including attempting to assassinate a United States president, carrying a possible sentence of life in prison if convicted. He pleaded not guilty to all of the charges on May 11. The dinner was rescheduled for July 24, at the Waldorf Astoria hotel, with advanced security measures in place.

==== April death threat ====
On April 30, 2026, a Tidal Wave Auto Spa car wash facility in Apex, North Carolina was evacuated after a witness noticed a BMW X5 SUV parked in front of the facility with threats against Trump written on the driver's side window, one of which claimed the driver was on his way to Washington, D.C. to kill him. The witness immediately called the police and a bomb squad arrived to evacuate the facility. The driver was arrested and charged with resisting a public officer, possession of methamphetamine, and using a fake license plate.

==== May National Mall shooting ====
At around 3:40 p.m. of May 4, 2026, the United States Secret Service exchanged gunfire with an armed man in the area of the National Mall near the Washington Monument in Washington, D.C., not far from the White House, the U.S. Capitol Building and the Lincoln Memorial. The man was wounded by several gunshots and was taken to a hospital for treatment. A bystander was also grazed by a bullet, while no law enforcement officers were injured.

==== May White House checkpoint shooting ====
On May 23, 2026, dozens of gunshots were heard outside the White House complex, triggering a lockdown. It was reported that an African American man approached a White House checkpoint and pulled a pistol from his handbag and began shooting. The Secret Service guards returned fire and shot the man, critically injuring him. He was transported to George Washington University Hospital where he died shortly after admission. A 41-year-old male bystander was also struck and injured by gunfire. A lockdown was placed on the White House, which contained reporters and journalists, and was lifted following the man's death announcement.

The suspect was 21-year-old Nasire Best, a Glenarden, Maryland resident. Reuters reported that, according to a law enforcement official, the perpetrator was an emotionally disturbed person who had a previous "stay-away order" issued to him.

==== June White House plot ====
On June 15, 2026, the Department of Justice released an affidavit alleging that several individuals planned an armed attack to take place during the 2026 UFC Freedom 250 event at the White House the day before, with the stated goal of launching an insurrection against Trump and multiple other members of the US government. According to authorities, a plot involving several individuals led by a DACA recipient, five of whom were arrested at the time, allegedly sought to exploit the UFC Freedom 250 event to carry out an attack on the White House using snipers and bomb-equipped drones. Their goal was to spark a revolution by decapitating the country's leadership structure. Suspects allegedly planned to target lawmakers who received money from pro-Israel groups.

Two days after the event, the Department of Justice filed a statement in the ongoing litigation regarding construction of a ballroom attached to the White House. The construction was facing a court challenge, and the Justice Department filed a letter with the court stating the government’s view that the ballroom's "mass and height will shield the White House grounds from attack, and give the Secret Service the visibility needed to identify attackers."

==== July alleged Iranian plot ====
In early July 2026, Israel provided the United States with an intelligence report alleging that Iran had developed a new plot to assassinate Trump. The claims were first reported by The Wall Street Journal. The threat prompted Trump to publicly board an older, more secure plane that had previously served as Air Force One rather than the Qatari-donated aircraft, which still lacked full presidential security upgrades, for his departure from the NATO summit in Turkey on July 8, after which he was secretly transferred to an Air Force C-32A. In Ankara, he boarded the older aircraft in front of television cameras, but a few minutes later he was secretly transferred to the smaller C-32A via an airport catering truck normally used to transport food and equipment to aircraft. Journalists raised concern about the press, who had remained on the prior AF1, being used as unwitting decoys.

On July 8, Trump said that Iran put him on a hit list where he is listed as the top target. When Trump was asked about the plot by the media, he said, "They want to take out the US leader—me, I'm on whatever list. I saw this morning I'm on every single one of their lists".

==== Armed man at golf course, August ====
In August 2026, a man was spotted taking photos and videos of the Trump-owned Trump National Golf Course in Rancho Palos Verdes, California, and later arrested on August 2, 2026 "on charges of carrying a concealed firearm and possession of armor-piercing/prohibited ammunition", after he was stopped by the Los Angeles Sheriff's Department and found with a 16-round magazine containing hollow point ammunition, illegal in California. Trump was visiting California and is planning a Republican party fundraising dinner at his golf club. As of August 4, officials have not stated whether the man was intending to attack Trump, and they also said that the man may face further charges.

==== November arrest near White House ====
On November 5, 2026, Secret Service agents arrested an armed Venezuelan man in a stolen vehicle near the White House.

== See also ==
- List of United States presidential assassination attempts and plots § Donald Trump
