= World Heart Beat Music Academy =

- Formation: 2012; 14 years ago
- Founder: Sahana Gero
- Location: Wandsworth, South West London, England

World Heart Beat Music Academy is an arts organisation and charity based in Wandsworth, South West London, England. World Heart Beat provides access to instruments and free or subsidised music tuition to children and young people aged between 5 and 24 years, particularly those who come from challenging and disadvantaged backgrounds. The academy teaches traditional and contemporary music in a variety of genres including Jazz, Classical, Asian, Celtic, Eastern European, Gypsy, Jazz and Reggae, and has a number of highly-accomplished professional musicians on its teaching staff.

Sahana Gero, founder of World Heart Beat, opened the academy in 2012, with the help of a Bank of America Merrill Lynch Neighbourhood Excellence Initiative Award and support from local residents and businesses. In 2013 Gucci Timepieces and Jewelry launched their UK Music Fund, to promote talented young musicians in the UK and partnered with World Heart Beat to provide ten student scholarships per year to attend the Los Angeles-based Grammy Camp.

World Heart Beat teaches music and provides various personal development opportunities to over 440 children and young people each year.

In November 2022, the organisation opened a second centre in London's newly-developed Nine Elms district. World Heart Beat Embassy Gardens comprises a state-of-the-art digital music education and concert venue, featuring a flexible capacity concert hall, a highly-specced recording studio, radio broadcasting suite, three teaching rooms, plus a community café and licensed bar. The venue produces around 100 concerts a year spanning Jazz, Classical, neoclassical, Global, Folk, Opera and more.
