= Vincent Fuller =

Vincent Fuller may refer to:

- Vincent Fuller (American football) (born 1982), American football player
- Vincent J. Fuller (1931–2006), American lawyer
