= Jerry Parr =

American Secret Service agent (1930–2015)

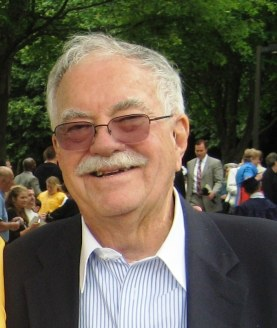
- Parr in 2013
- Born: September 16, 1930; Montgomery, Alabama, U.S.
- Died: October 9, 2015 (aged 85); Washington, D.C., U.S.
- Education: Vanderbilt University; Loyola University
- Occupation: Secret Service agent
- Known for: Saving President Reagan during the 1981 assassination attempt
- Spouse: Carolyn Parr (m. 1959)
- Children: 3

Jerry S. Parr (September 16, 1930 – October 9, 2015) was a United States Secret Service agent who is best known for defending President Ronald Reagan during the attempt on the president's life on March 30, 1981, in Washington, D.C. Parr pushed Reagan into the presidential limousine and made the critical decision to divert the presidential motorcade to George Washington University Hospital instead of returning to the White House. He was honored for his actions that day with U.S. Congress commendations, and is widely credited with helping to save the president's life.

== Early life ==
Jerry Studstill Parr was born in Montgomery, Alabama, on September 16, 1930, and he grew up in the Miami area. Parr received his B.A. in English and Philosophy from Vanderbilt University in 1962. In 1987, he received his M.S. in pastoral counseling from Loyola University in Maryland.

An ordained minister, in 1987, Parr was awarded an honorary doctorate in Humane Letters from Eureka College.

== Career with the Secret Service ==
Parr's interest in joining the Secret Service originated as a boy after watching Code of the Secret Service (1939) starring Ronald Reagan as agent "Brass" Bancroft. He was working as a lineman for Florida Power and Light in 1962 when he was interviewed by a visiting recruiter for the Secret Service. When asked if he was able to assume the risks of the job, Parr replied it was probably no more dangerous than what he had been doing for the power company. He joined the Secret Service at age 32, the oldest rookie in his class. His first protection assignment was John F. Kennedy and Lyndon B. Johnson at the funeral of Eleanor Roosevelt. After Kennedy was assassinated, Parr was assigned to protect Marina Oswald, and Marguerite Oswald, the widow, and the mother, respectively, of Lee Harvey Oswald until completion of Marina's testimony before the Warren Commission.

Over the next 23 years, Parr conducted 15 foreign and 65 domestic protective surveys for various presidents and vice presidents, and worked with security, intelligence and law enforcement professionals in all 50 states and in 37 countries. From 1969 to 1978, he worked for the Foreign Dignitary Division as a mid-level supervisor on the Humphrey, Agnew and Ford details, and directed security for 56 foreign heads of state, including Queen Elizabeth II of Britain, Emperor Hirohito of Japan, King Juan Carlos of Spain and Pope John Paul II.

From 1978 to 1979, he was Special Agent in Charge of the Vice Presidential Protective Division, where he directed security for Vice President Mondale. In 1979, Parr moved to the Presidential Protective Division, where he was Special Agent in Charge and Head of the White House Detail. There, he directed security for Presidents Carter and Reagan. In 1982, he became Assistant Director of Protective Research, and in 1985, Parr retired from the Secret Service. Parr's story is told in his autobiography, In the Secret Service: The True Story Of The Man who Saved President Reagan (Tyndale House Publishing), co-authored by his wife Carolyn Parr.

== Ronald Reagan assassination attempt ==
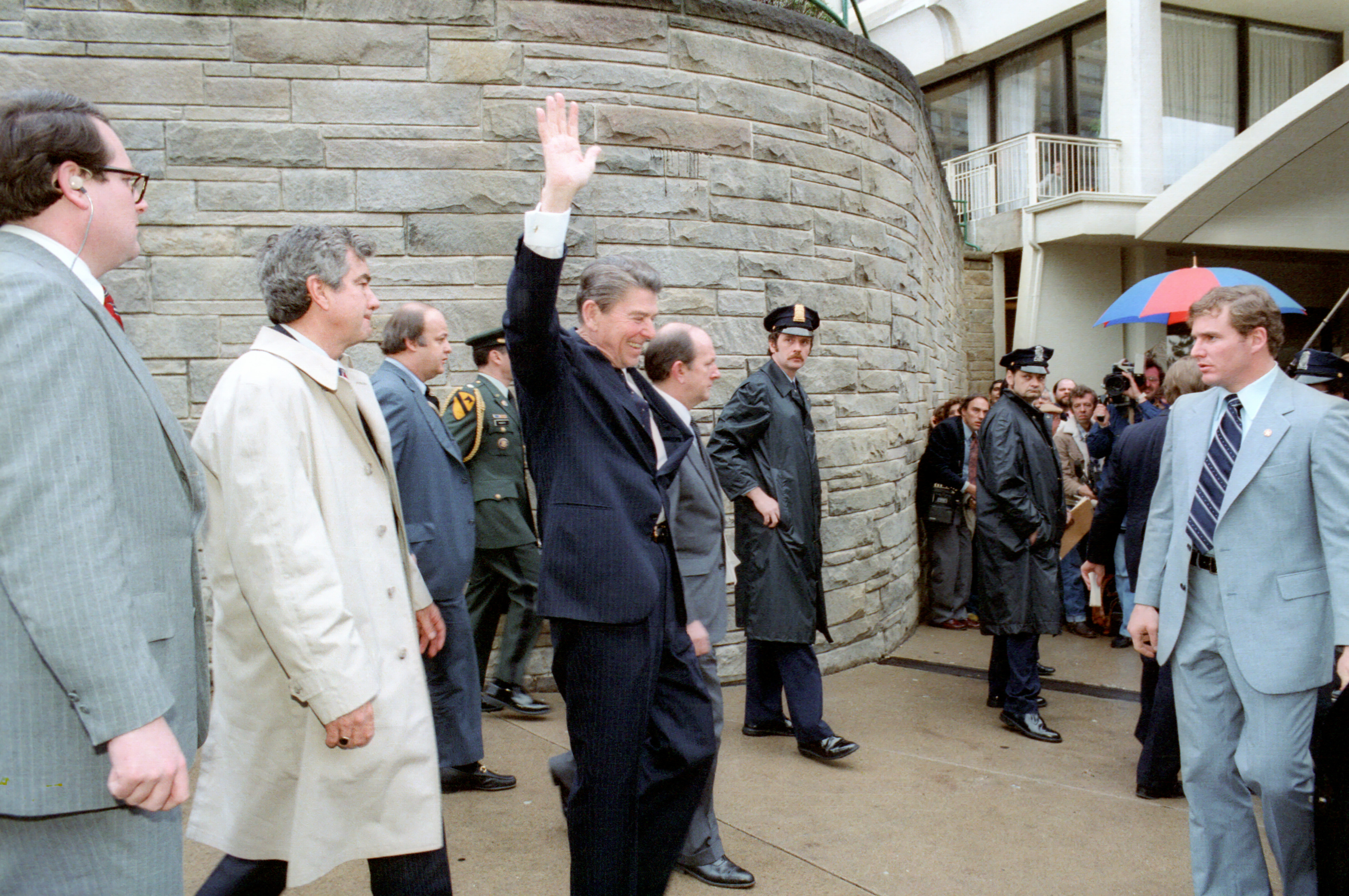
US President Ronald Reagan waves just before he is shot outside a Washington hotel on March 30, 1981. From left are From left to right are Rick Ahearn, publicist for Reagan; Parr, in raincoat, who pushed Reagan into the limousine; press secretary James Brady, who was seriously wounded; Reagan; Michael Deaver, Reagan's aide; police Sergeant Herbert Granger; Washington policeman Thomas Delahanty, who was shot in the neck; and Secret Service agent Tim McCarthy, who was shot in the chest.

On March 30, 1981, John Hinckley Jr. opened fire on President Ronald Reagan as he exited the Washington Hilton Hotel after giving a speech, firing six bullets in 1.7 seconds. Parr quickly pushed Reagan into the limousine, and as a result, one of the bullets overshot the president. Parr's prompt reaction had saved Reagan from being hit in the head.^{[13]:224} However, the final bullet ricocheted off the armored side of the limousine and hit the president in the left underarm, grazing a rib and lodging in his lung, causing it to partially collapse, and stopping less than an inch (25 mm) from his heart.^{[32][17][20]}

Carolyn, Parr's wife, had been standing directly across the street when the shooting occurred. Parr had called to invite her to come watch the president's exit and get a fun glimpse of her husband in action.

After the Secret Service first announced "shots fired" over its radio network at 2:27 p.m., Reagan—codename "Rawhide"—was taken away by the agents in the limousine ("Stagecoach").^{[36]} At first, no one knew that he had been shot, and Parr stated that "Rawhide is OK...we're going to Crown" (the White House), as he preferred its medical facilities to an unsecured hospital.^{[37][36]}

Reagan was in great pain from the bullet that struck his rib, and he believed that the rib had cracked when Parr pushed him into the limousine. When the agent checked him for gunshot wounds, however, Reagan coughed up bright, frothy blood.^{[32]} Although the president believed that he had cut his lip,^{[37]} Parr believed that the cracked rib had punctured Reagan's lung and ordered the motorcade to divert to nearby George Washington University Hospital, which the Secret Service periodically inspected for use.^{[23]} Although Reagan came close to death, the medical team's quick action—and Parr's decision to drive to the hospital instead of the White House—likely saved the president's life.^{[32]}

After the assassination attempt, Jerry Parr was hailed as a hero. He received congressional commendations for his actions, and was named one of four "Top Cops" in the U.S. by Parade magazine. He later wrote about the assassination attempt in his autobiography, calling it both the best and the worst day of his life. Parr came to believe that God had directed his life so that he could one day save the president's life, and became a pastor after retiring from the Secret Service in 1985.

== Community service ==
Parr was very active in his church in Washington, D.C., where he was a former co-pastor, retreat leader and spiritual director. He served on the board of directors at Joseph's House, an organization for men with AIDS and co-founded Servant Leadership School. In April 1992, he drove a school bus more than 3,000 miles from Washington, D.C., to deliver supplies to an orphanage in San Salvador.

== Death ==
Parr died of congestive heart failure at a hospice in Washington, D.C., on October 9, 2015, aged 85. He was survived by Carolyn, his wife of nearly 56 years, three daughters and four granddaughters.

== Awards and honors ==
- Presidential Rank Award for Meritorious Executive from the U.S. Secret Service, 1984
- U.S. Congress commendations for actions on March 30, 1981, during the attempt on President Reagan's life
- Director's Award of Valor, U.S. Secret Service
- Exceptional Service Award, U.S. Treasury Department
- Honor League, New York Police Department
- Commendation by the Maryland State Senate
- Named as one of four "Top Cops" by Parade magazine, 1981

== Professional organizations ==
Parr was a member of the Association for Conflict Resolution and American Association of Pastoral Counsellors. Previously, he was the president of the Association of Former Agents of the U.S. Secret Service.

== Filmography ==
Parr was a film advisor for the feature film dramas In the Line of Fire (1993) and Contact (1997), and for the documentaries In the Line of Fire: Behind the Scenes with the Secret Service (1993), and Inside the US Secret Service (2004). He also served as a commentator on C-SPAN, Larry King Live, Meet the Press, Discovery Channel, History Channel, PBS, and Travel Channel.

== Depiction in media ==
Parr was portrayed by John Robinson in the 2003 film The Reagans and by Joe Chrest in the 2016 television film Killing Reagan.
