= Attempted assassination of Ronald Reagan =

1981 shooting in Washington, D.C., U.S.

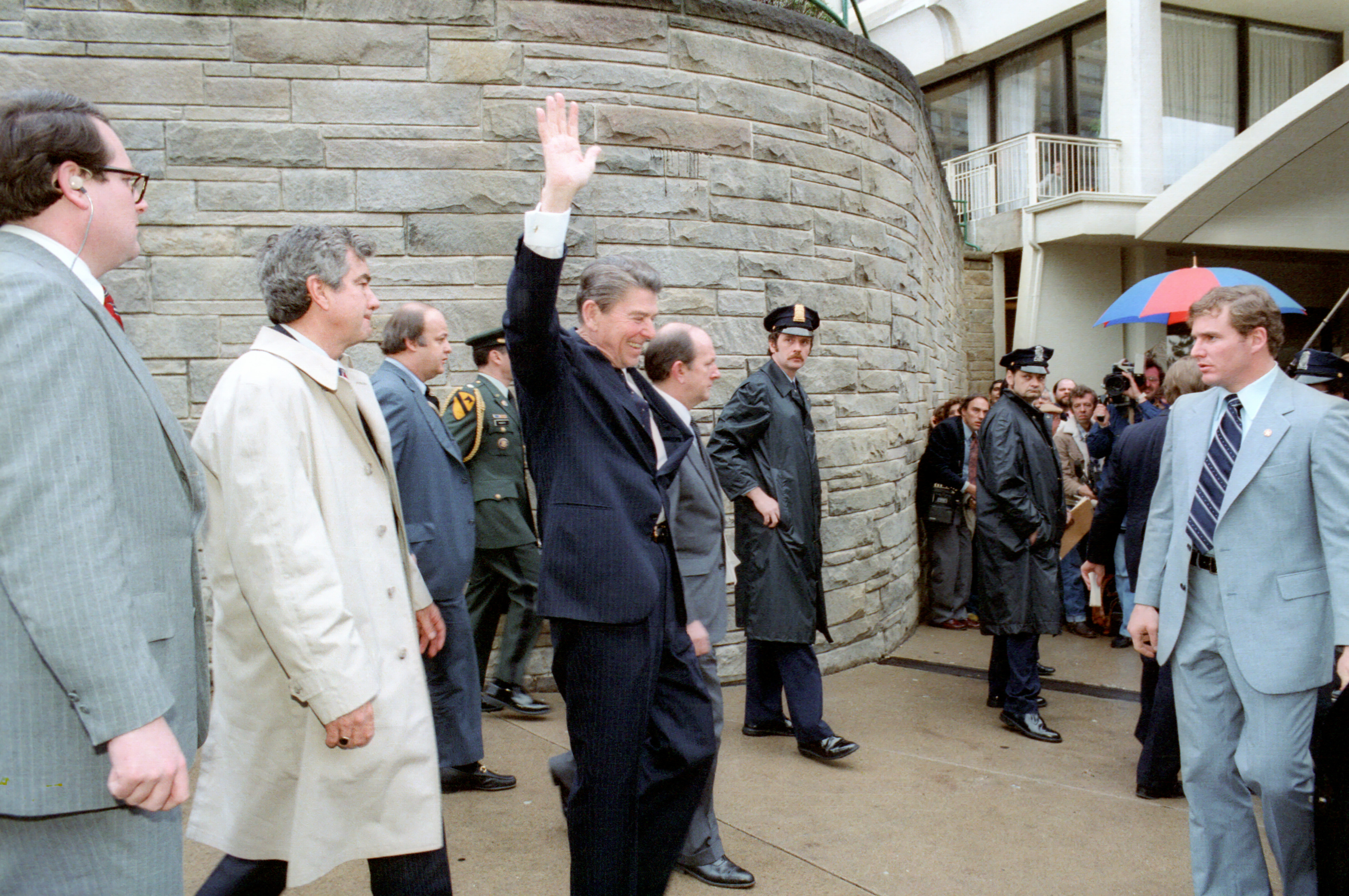
- Reagan waves shortly before he is shot. From left are advance man Rick Ahearn; Jerry Parr, in a white trench coat, who pushed Reagan into the limousine; White House press secretary James Brady, who was disabled by a gunshot to the head; Reagan; aide Michael Deaver; an unidentified policeman; policeman Thomas Delahanty, who was shot in the neck; and Secret Service agent Tim McCarthy, who was shot in the chest.
- Location: 38.9161°N 77.0454°W; Washington Hilton, Washington, D.C., United States
- Date: March 30, 1981; 45 years ago 2:27 p.m. (Eastern Time)
- Target: Ronald Reagan
- Attack type: Attempted assassination (Reagan), shooting
- Weapon: Röhm RG-14
- Deaths: 1 (James Brady (Note: James Brady was permanently disabled from his gunshot wound and died as a result of his injuries on August 4, 2014, 33 years after the event.))
- Injuries: 3 (Reagan, Tim McCarthy, Thomas Delahanty)
- Perpetrator: John Hinckley Jr.
- Motive: Mental illness; Attempt to gain the attention of actress Jodie Foster
- Charges: 13 counts (Note: Attempting to assassinate the president of the United States; Assault on a federal officer; Use of a firearm during the commission of a federal felony; Assault with a dangerous weapon (x4); Assault with intent to kill while armed (x4); Assaulting a police officer with a deadly weapon; Carrying a pistol without the required license)
- Verdict: Not guilty by reason of insanity
- Sentence: Institutionalization
- Website: reaganlibrary.gov

On March 30, 1981, Ronald Reagan, the president of the United States, was shot and wounded by John Hinckley Jr. outside of the Washington Hilton in Washington, D.C., as Reagan was returning to his limousine after a speaking engagement at the hotel. Hinckley believed the attack would impress the actress Jodie Foster, with whom he had developed an erotomanic obsession after viewing her in the 1976 film Taxi Driver.

Reagan was seriously wounded by a revolver bullet that ricocheted off the side of the presidential limousine and hit him in the left underarm, breaking a rib, puncturing a lung, and causing serious internal bleeding. He underwent emergency exploratory surgery at George Washington University Hospital, and was released on April 11. No formal invocation of sections 3 or 4 of the U.S. Constitution's Twenty-fifth Amendment (concerning the vice president assuming the president's powers and duties) took place, though Secretary of State Alexander Haig stated that he was "in control here" at the White House until Vice President George H. W. Bush returned to Washington from Fort Worth, Texas. Haig was fourth in the line of succession after Bush, Speaker of the House Tip O'Neill, and President pro tempore of the Senate Strom Thurmond.

White House press secretary James Brady, Secret Service agent Tim McCarthy, and D.C. police officer Thomas Delahanty were also wounded. All three survived, but Brady suffered brain damage and was permanently disabled; he died in 2014 as a result of his injury.

On June 21, 1982, Hinckley was found not guilty by reason of insanity on all counts. He remained confined to St. Elizabeths Hospital, a psychiatric facility in Washington, D.C. In 2015, federal prosecutors announced that they would not charge Hinckley with Brady's death, despite the medical examiner's classification of his death as a homicide. Hinckley was discharged from his institutional psychiatric care in 2016.

== Background ==
John Hinckley Jr. had erotomania and his motivation for the attack was born of his obsession with the actress Jodie Foster. While living in Hollywood in the late 1970s, he saw the film Taxi Driver at least 15 times, apparently identifying strongly with its protagonist, Travis Bickle, portrayed by the actor Robert De Niro. The story involves Bickle's attempts to save a child prostitute played by Foster. Toward the end of the film, Bickle attempts to assassinate a United States senator who is running for president.

Over the following years, Hinckley trailed Foster around the country, going so far as to enroll in a writing course at Yale University in 1980 after reading in People magazine that she was a student there. He wrote numerous letters and notes to her in late 1980. He called her twice and refused to give up when she indicated that she was not interested in him.

Hinckley was convinced that he would be Foster's equal if he became a national figure. He decided to emulate Bickle and began stalking President Jimmy Carter. He was surprised at how easy it was to get close to the president—he was only a foot away at one event—but was arrested in October 1980 at Nashville International Airport and fined for illegal possession of a firearm. Carter had made a campaign stop there, but the FBI did not connect this arrest to the president and did not notify the Secret Service.

His parents briefly placed him under the care of a psychiatrist. Hinckley turned his attention to Ronald Reagan, whose election, he told his parents, would be good for the country. He wrote three or four more notes to Foster in early March 1981. Foster gave these notes to a Yale dean, who gave them to the Yale police department, who sought but failed to track Hinckley down.

== Attempted assassination ==
On March 21, 1981, Reagan and his wife, Nancy, visited Ford's Theatre in Washington, D.C., for a fundraising event. In his autobiography An American Life, Reagan recalled,

I looked up at the presidential box above the stage where Abe Lincoln had been sitting the night he was shot and felt a curious sensation ... I thought that even with all the Secret Service protection we now had, it was probably still possible for someone who had enough determination to get close enough to the president to shoot him.

=== Speaking engagement at the Washington Hilton Hotel ===
On March 28, Hinckley arrived in Washington, D.C., by bus and checked into the Park Central Hotel. He originally intended to continue on to New Haven in another attempt to infatuate Foster. He noticed Reagan's schedule that was published in The Washington Star and decided it was time to act. Hinckley knew that he might be killed during the assassination attempt, and he wrote but did not mail a letter to Foster about two hours prior to his attempt on the president's life. In the letter, he said that he hoped to impress her with the magnitude of his action and that he would "abandon the idea of getting Reagan in a second if I could only win your heart and live out the rest of my life with you."

On March 30, Reagan delivered a luncheon address to AFL–CIO representatives at the Washington Hilton. The Secret Service was very familiar with the hotel, having inspected it more than 100 times for presidential visits since the early 1970s. The Hilton was considered the safest venue in Washington because of its secure, enclosed passageway called "President's Walk", built after the 1963 assassination of John F. Kennedy. Reagan entered the building through the passageway at about 1:45 p.m., waving to a crowd of news media and citizens.

The Secret Service had required him to wear a bulletproof vest for some events, but Reagan was not wearing one for the speech, because his only public exposure would be the 30 feet (9 m) between the hotel and his limousine, and the agency did not require vests for agents that day. No one saw Hinckley behaving in an unusual way. Witnesses who reported him as "fidgety" and "agitated" apparently confused Hinckley with another person that the Secret Service had been monitoring.

=== Shooting ===
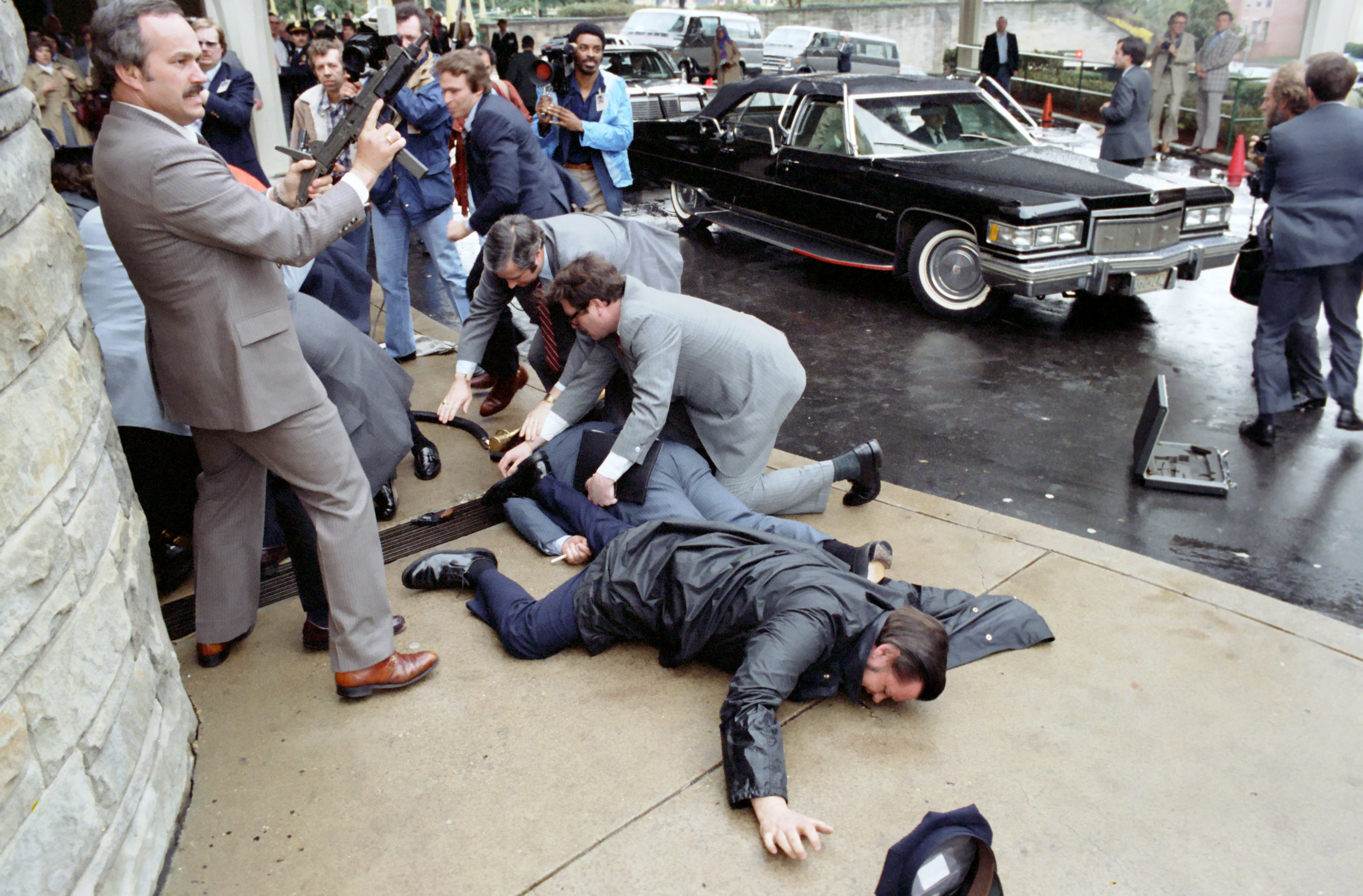
Secret Service agents cover Press Secretary James Brady and the police officer Thomas Delahanty during the assassination attempt of Reagan. Secret Service Agent Robert Wanko can be seen unfolding the stock of an Uzi in case of further attack.

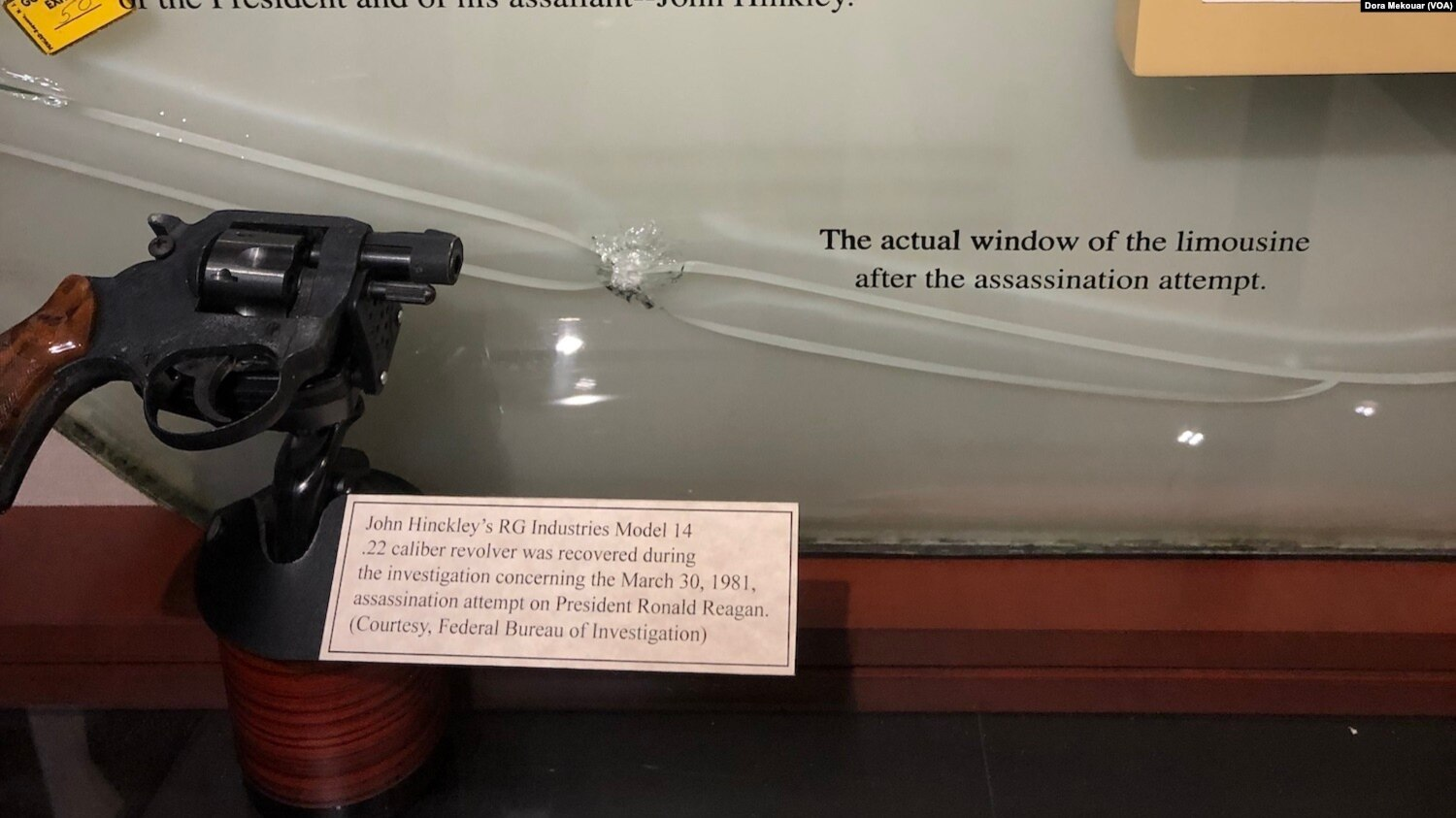
Hinckley's Röhm RG-14 revolver and the armored-glass limousine window that was struck by Hinckley's fifth shot. On display at the US Secret Service's restricted-access museum, 2022.

At 2:27 p.m., Reagan exited the hotel through "President's Walk" on Florida Avenue, where reporters waited. He left the T Street NW exit toward his waiting limousine as Hinckley waited in the crowd. The Secret Service had extensively screened those attending the president's speech, but allowed an unscreened group to stand within 15 ft (4.5 m) of him, behind a rope line. The agency uses multiple layers of protection. Local police in the outer layer briefly check people, Secret Service agents in the middle layer check for weapons and more agents form the inner layer immediately around the president. Hinckley had penetrated the first two layers.

As several hundred people applauded Reagan, the president unexpectedly passed right in front of Hinckley. Reporters standing behind a rope barricade 20 feet (6 m) away asked questions. As Mike Putzel of the Associated Press shouted "Mr. President—", Hinckley assumed a crouch position and rapidly fired a Röhm RG-14 .22 LR blue steel revolver six times in 1.7 seconds, missing the president with all six shots.

The first shot hit White House press secretary James Brady in the head above his left eye, passing through underneath his brain and shattering his brain cavity. The bullet had a small explosive charge within it which exploded on impact. District of Columbia police officer Thomas Delahanty recognized the sound as a gunshot and turned his head sharply to the left to identify the shooter. As he did so, he was struck in the back of his neck by the second shot, the bullet ricocheting off his spine. Delahanty fell on top of Brady, screaming "I am hit!"

Hinckley now had a clear shot at the president, but Alfred Antenucci, a labor official from Cleveland who was standing nearby, and saw Hinckley fire, struck him on the head, and began to wrestle him from behind. Upon hearing the shots, Special Agent in Charge Jerry Parr almost instantly grabbed Reagan by the shoulders and dove with him toward the open rear door of the limousine. Agent Ray Shaddick trailed just behind Parr to assist in throwing both men into the car. The third round overshot the president, instead hitting the window of a building across the street. Parr's actions likely saved Reagan from being shot in the head.

As Parr pushed Reagan into the limousine, Secret Service agent Tim McCarthy snapped his attention toward the sound of the gunfire, pivoted to his right, and placed himself in the line of fire. McCarthy spread his arms and legs, taking a wide stance directly in front of Reagan and Parr to make himself a target. McCarthy was struck in the lower chest by the fourth round, the bullet traversing his right lung, diaphragm and right lobe of the liver.

The fifth round hit the bullet-resistant glass of the window on the open rear door of the limousine as Reagan and Parr were passing behind it. The sixth and final bullet ricocheted off the armored side of the limousine, passed between the space of the open rear door and vehicle frame and hit the president in the left underarm. The round grazed a rib and lodged in his lung, causing it to partially collapse before stopping less than an inch (25 mm) from his heart.

Within moments of the first shots, Secret Service agent Dennis McCarthy, no relation to Tim McCarthy, dove across the sidewalk and landed directly on Hinckley, as others pushed Hinckley to the ground. Another Cleveland-area labor official, Frank J. McNamara, joined Antenucci and began punching Hinckley in the head, striking him so hard that he drew blood. Dennis McCarthy later reported that he had to "strike two citizens" to force them to release Hinckley. Secret Service agent Robert Wanko deployed an Uzi submachine gun concealed in a briefcase to cover the president's evacuation, and to deter a potential group attack.

The day after the shooting, Hinckley's gun was given to the ATF, which traced its origin. In just 16 minutes, agents found that the gun had been purchased at Rocky's Pawn Shop in Dallas, Texas, on October 13, 1980. It had been loaded with six Devastator brand cartridges, which contained small aluminum and lead azide explosive charges designed to explode on contact, but the bullet that hit Brady was the only one that exploded. On April 2, after learning that the others could explode at any time, volunteer doctors wearing bulletproof vests removed the bullet from Delahanty's neck.

=== George Washington University Hospital ===
Audio of Secret Service radio traffic

After the Secret Service first announced "shots fired" over its radio network at 2:27 p.m., Reagan—codename "Rawhide"—was removed from the scene by the agents in the limousine ("Stagecoach"). No one knew that Reagan had been shot. After Parr searched Reagan's body and found no blood, he stated that "Rawhide is OK...we're going to Crown" (the White House), as he preferred its medical facilities to those of an unsecured hospital.

Reagan was in great pain from the bullet that struck his rib, and believed that his rib had cracked when Parr pushed him into the limousine. When the agent checked him for gunshot wounds, Reagan coughed up bright, frothy blood. Although the president believed that he had cut his lip, Parr assessed that the cracked rib had punctured Reagan's lung and ordered the motorcade to divert to nearby George Washington University Hospital, which the Secret Service periodically inspected for use. The limousine arrived there less than four minutes after leaving the hotel, while other agents took Hinckley to a jail, and Nancy Reagan ("Rainbow") left the White House for the hospital.

Although Parr had requested a stretcher, none were ready at the hospital, which did not normally station a stretcher at the emergency department's entrance. Reagan exited the limousine and insisted on walking. He acted casually and smiled at onlookers as he entered the hospital. While he entered the hospital unassisted, once inside, Reagan complained of difficulty breathing, his knees buckled and he fell to one knee. Parr and others assisted him into the emergency department.

The physician to the president, Daniel Ruge, had been near Reagan during the shooting and arrived in a separate car. Believing that the president might have experienced a heart attack, Ruge insisted that the hospital's trauma team operate on Reagan as they would any other patient. When a hospital employee asked Reagan's aide Michael Deaver for the patient's name and address, only when Deaver stated "1600 Pennsylvania" did the worker realize that the president was in the emergency department.

The medical team, led by Joseph Giordano, cut Reagan's "thousand-dollar" custom-made suit in order to examine him. Reagan complained about the cost of the ruined suit, which was cited by an assistant in a press briefing to reassure the public that the president was in stable health. Military officers, including the one who carried the nuclear football, unsuccessfully tried to prevent Federal Bureau of Investigation (FBI) agents from confiscating the suit, Reagan's wallet and other possessions as evidence. The Gold Codes card was in the wallet, and the FBI did not return it until two days later.

The medical personnel found that Reagan's systolic blood pressure was 60 compared to the normal 140, indicating that he was in shock, and knew that most 70-year-olds in the president's condition would not survive. However, Reagan was in excellent physical health, and had been shot by a .22 (5.6 mm)-caliber bullet instead of a larger .38 (9.7 mm) as was first feared. They treated him with intravenous fluids, oxygen, tetanus toxoid and chest tubes and surprised Parr—who still believed that he had cracked the president's rib—by finding the entrance of the gunshot wound. Doctors operated on Brady and the wounded agent Tim McCarthy near the president.

When Nancy Reagan arrived in the emergency department, Reagan remarked to her, "Honey, I forgot to duck", borrowing the boxer Jack Dempsey's line to his wife from the night on which he was beaten by Gene Tunney. While intubated, he scribbled to a nurse, "All in all, I'd rather be in Philadelphia", borrowing a line from W. C. Fields. Although Reagan came close to death, the team's quick action—and Parr's decision to drive to the hospital instead of the White House—likely saved the president's life.

Within 30 minutes, Reagan left the emergency department for surgery, with normal blood pressure. He then underwent emergency exploratory surgery to check for organ damage and remove the bullet. The chief of thoracic surgery, Benjamin L. Aaron, performed a thoracotomy lasting 105 minutes because the bleeding persisted. Ultimately, Reagan lost over half of his blood volume in the emergency department and during surgery, but the bullet was successfully removed.

In the operating room, Reagan removed his oxygen mask to joke, "I hope you are all Republicans." The doctors and nurses laughed, and Giordano, a Democrat, replied, "Today, Mr. President, we are all Republicans." Reagan's post-operative course was complicated by fever, which was treated with antibiotics. Because Reagan had entered the operating room conscious and not in shock, and the surgery was routine, his doctors and others predicted that he could leave the hospital in two weeks, return to work at the Oval Office in a month and completely heal in six to eight weeks with no long-term effects.

== Immediate response ==
National Security Advisor Richard Allen would traditionally be responsible for crisis management for the executive branch, but Secretary of State Alexander Haig wanted the role. Six days before the shooting, Vice President George H. W. Bush received the assignment instead, Allen and the National Security Council would assist him, Reagan persuaded an upset Haig not to resign. The secretary reportedly "pound[ed] the table in frustration and anger."

When news of the assassination attempt reached the White House, Haig was there. He urged the vice president—visiting Texas for the first time since his and Reagan's inauguration—to return, but the voice connection to Bush aboard Air Force Two was weak, and it is unknown whether they heard each other.

By 2:35 p.m., Bush was notified of the shooting. He was leaving Fort Worth, Texas and, relying on the initial reports that Reagan was unharmed, he flew to Austin, Texas, for a speech. At 3:14 p.m., 47 minutes after the shooting, Haig sent a coded teletype message to Bush:

MR. VICE PRESIDENT: IN THE INCIDENT YOU WILL HAVE HEARD ABOUT BY NOW, THE PRESIDENT WAS STRUCK IN THE BACK AND IS IN SERIOUS CONDITION. MEDICAL AUTHORITIES ARE DECIDING NOW WHETHER OR NOT TO OPERATE. RECOMMEND YOU RETURN TO DC AT EARLIEST POSSIBLE MOMENT. SECRETARY ALEXANDER HAIG, JR.

Air Force Two refueled in Austin before returning to Washington, at what its pilot described as the fastest speed in the plane's history. The aircraft did not have secure voice communications, and Bush's discussions with the White House were intercepted and given to the press.

White House counsel Fred Fielding immediately prepared for a transfer of presidential powers under the Twenty-fifth Amendment to the U.S. Constitution, and Chief of Staff James A. Baker and Counselor to the President Edwin Meese went to Reagan's hospital still believing that he was unharmed. Within five minutes of the shooting, members of the Cabinet began gathering in the White House Situation Room. The Cabinet and the Secret Service were initially unsure whether the shooting was part of a larger attack by terrorists, or that of a foreign intelligence service such as the KGB. Tensions with the Soviet Union were high because of the Solidarity movement in communist Poland.

The Cabinet was also concerned that the Soviets would take advantage of the unstable situation to launch a nuclear attack. After the shooting, the American military detected two Soviet ballistic missile submarines patrolling unusually close to the East Coast of the United States, which could allow their missiles to reach Washington, D.C., two minutes faster than usual. Defense secretary Caspar Weinberger responded by placing the Strategic Air Command on high alert.

Haig, Weinberger, and Allen discussed various issues, including the location of the nuclear football, the submarine presence, a possible Soviet invasion against the 1981 warning strike in Poland, and the presidential line of succession. Although tape recorders are not normally allowed in the Situation Room, these meetings were recorded with the participants' knowledge by Allen, and the five hours of tapes have since been made public.

The group obtained a duplicate nuclear football and Gold Codes card and kept it in the Situation Room. Reagan's football was still with the officer at the hospital, and Bush also had a card and football. The participants discussed whether to raise the military's alert status and the importance of doing so without changing the DEFCON level. They eventually determined that the number of Soviet submarines was normal. A pair of Soviet submarines was assuming the patrol area from another pair, a relief operation that routinely occurred at the end of a month. However, one of the four submarines was patrolling unusually close to the coast. In consideration of the ongoing tensions over Poland, Weinberger ordered the Strategic Air Command to be placed on alert, but he did not reveal the alert status to the public.

Upon learning that Reagan was in surgery, Haig declared, the "helm is right here. And that means right in this chair for now, constitutionally, until the vice president gets here". However, Haig was incorrect. As the sitting secretary of state, he was fourth behind Vice President Bush, Speaker of the House Tip O'Neill, and President pro tempore of the Senate Strom Thurmond in the line of succession. Under 3 U.S.C. § 19, O'Neill and Thurmond would have to resign their positions to become acting president. Although others in the room knew that Haig's statement was constitutionally incorrect, they did not object at the time, to avoid a confrontation. Allen later said that although Haig "constantly, incessantly drummed on some variant of 'I am in charge, I am senior'", he and Fielding "didn't give a rat's ass", as Bush would be in charge when he arrived.

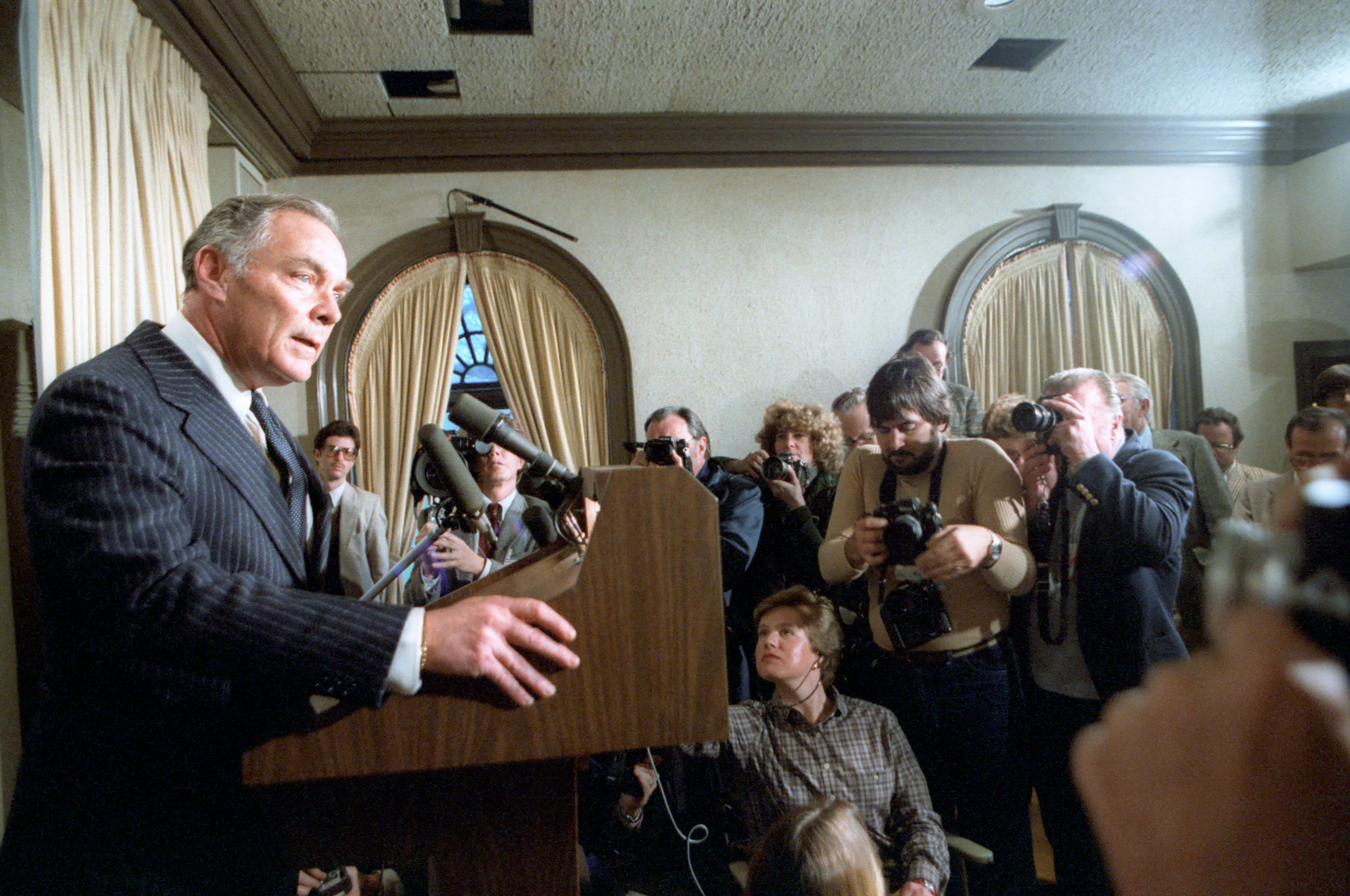
Secretary of State Alexander Haig speaks to the press about the shooting.

At the same time, a press conference was under way in the White House Briefing Room. CBS reporter Lesley Stahl asked deputy press secretary Larry Speakes who was running the government, to which Speakes responded, "I cannot answer that question at this time". Upon hearing Speakes's remark, Haig wrote and passed a note to Speakes, ordering him to leave the dais immediately. Moments later, Haig entered the Briefing Room, where he made the following controversial statement:

Constitutionally, gentlemen, you have the president, the vice president and the secretary of state, in that order, and should the president decide he wants to transfer the helm to the vice president, he will do so. As of now, I am in control here, in the White House, pending the return of the vice president and in close touch with him. If something came up, I would check with him, of course.

Despite his familiarity with the Briefing Room from serving as Richard Nixon's chief of staff, Stahl described Haig as "visibly shaken", and the Associated Press wrote that "his voice continually choked up and quavered with emotion, and his arms trembled". Those in the Situation Room reportedly laughed when they heard him say "I am in control here". Allen later said "I was astounded that he would say something so eminently stupid". Haig later said,

I wasn't talking about transition. I was talking about the executive branch, who is running the government. That was the question asked. It was not "Who is in line should the President die?"

Although Haig stated in the Briefing Room that "There are absolutely no alert measures that are necessary at this time or contemplated", while he was speaking, Weinberger raised the military's alert level. After Haig returned to the Situation Room, he objected to Weinberger doing so, as it made him appear a liar, although as deputy commander-in-chief, Weinberger was outranked only by Reagan in the National Command Authority. Weinberger and others accused Haig of exceeding his authority with his "I am in control" statement. Haig defended himself by advising the others to "read the Constitution", saying that his comments did not involve "succession" and that he knew the "pecking order".

Aboard Air Force Two, Bush watched Haig's press briefing. Meese told him that Reagan was stable after surgery to remove the bullet. The vice president arrived at Andrews Air Force Base at 6:30 p.m. and decided to not fly by helicopter to the White House. He said to a military aide "only the president lands on the South Lawn". Bush later said in an interview that landing on the South Lawn would have "made for great TV", but would have sent the wrong message to the country, and pointed out that the South Lawn was situated under the president's bedroom window, where the First Lady was waiting for news of Reagan's surgery. Marine Two instead flew to Number One Observatory Circle.

"Despite brief flare-ups and distractions", Allen recalled, "the crisis management team in the Situation Room worked well together. The congressional leadership was kept informed, and governments around the world were notified and reassured." Reagan's surgery ended at 6:20 p.m., although he did not regain consciousness until 7:30 p.m., so could not invoke Section 3 of the 25th Amendment to make Bush acting president. The vice president arrived at the White House at 7:00 p.m., and did not invoke Section 4 of the 25th Amendment.

Bush took charge of the Situation Room meeting, which received an update that the planned Polish national strike was cancelled. They evaluated new satellite images from Eastern Europe that showed no Soviet troop movements near Poland. They further assessed that Hinckley Jr. was likely acting alone after being informed of his October 1980 arrest record in Nashville, which suggested that he had been trailing then-President Carter. Bush stated on national television at 8:20 p.m.:

I can reassure this nation and a watching world that the American government is functioning fully and effectively. We've had full and complete communications throughout the day.

== Investigation ==
The FBI took over the investigation on Saturday. Agents obtained a warrant and searched the shooter's hotel room. Before touching anything, the entire room was filmed and photographed. Fingerprints were then sought in case there was an accomplice.

According to Agent Thomas J. Baker: "What we found in Mr Hinckley's room was bizarre. On the desk, so that we could find him, was his entire plan. He had left a map of where he was going. He had the morning paper open with the president's diary. He publicised the fact that Reagan would be speaking to a union group in the ballroom of the Washington Hilton. Strangest of all was a statement - a letter to actress Jodie Foster proclaiming that he was committing a historic act, a presidential assassination, to impress her."

The serial number of Hinckley's revolver was provided to the Bureau of Alcohol, Tobacco, Firearms and Explosives. It quickly determined where Hinckley bought the gun. The police gathered the witnesses in the auditorium where the president had given a speech. Secret Service agents who were witnesses or had other first-hand information were identified.

According to Agent Thomas J. Baker: "Our follow-up investigation, which lasted weeks, traced Mr Hinckley's history over the previous months. We determined that he had travelled the country, gone to firing ranges and, in fact, was obsessed with Ms Foster. He had planned and committed an assassination attempt on the president. He was a mentally disturbed man.".

== Public reaction ==
The assassination attempt was captured on electronic news-gathering videotape by several cameras, including those belonging to the Big Three television networks. ABC began airing footage at 2:42 p.m. All three networks erroneously reported that Brady had died. When ABC News anchorman Frank Reynolds, a close friend of Brady, was later forced to retract the report; visibly upset, he angrily said to his staff on the air, "Let's get it nailed down, somebody! Let's find out!", as a result of the miscommunication. ABC News also initially reported that President Reagan had not been injured. A network erroneously reported that he was undergoing open-heart surgery.

While CNN did not have a camera of its own at the shooting, it was able to use NBC's pool feed, and by staying on the story for 48 hours, the network, less than a year old, built a reputation for thoroughness. Shocked Americans gathered around television sets in homes and shopping centers. Some cited the alleged Curse of Tippecanoe, and others recalled the assassinations of John F. Kennedy and Martin Luther King Jr. Newspapers printed extra editions and used gigantic headlines; the United States Senate adjourned, interrupting debate of Reagan's economic proposals; and churches held prayer services.

Hinckley asked the arresting officers whether that night's ceremony for the 53rd Academy Awards would be postponed because of the shooting, and it was. The ceremony—for which Reagan, a former actor, had taped a message—occurred the next evening. The president survived surgery with a good prognosis. The NCAA championship basketball game that evening between Indiana and North Carolina was not postponed, although the audience of 18,000 in Philadelphia held a moment of silence before the game, which Indiana won.

In the immediate aftermath of the shooting, the Dow Jones Industrial Average declined before the New York Stock Exchange closed early, but the index rose the next day as Reagan recovered. Beyond having to postpone its Academy Awards broadcast, ABC temporarily renamed the lead character of The Greatest American Hero, which had debuted in March, from "Ralph Hinkley" to "Hanley", and NBC postponed a forthcoming episode of Walking Tall titled "Hit Man".

== Aftermath ==
=== Jodie Foster ===
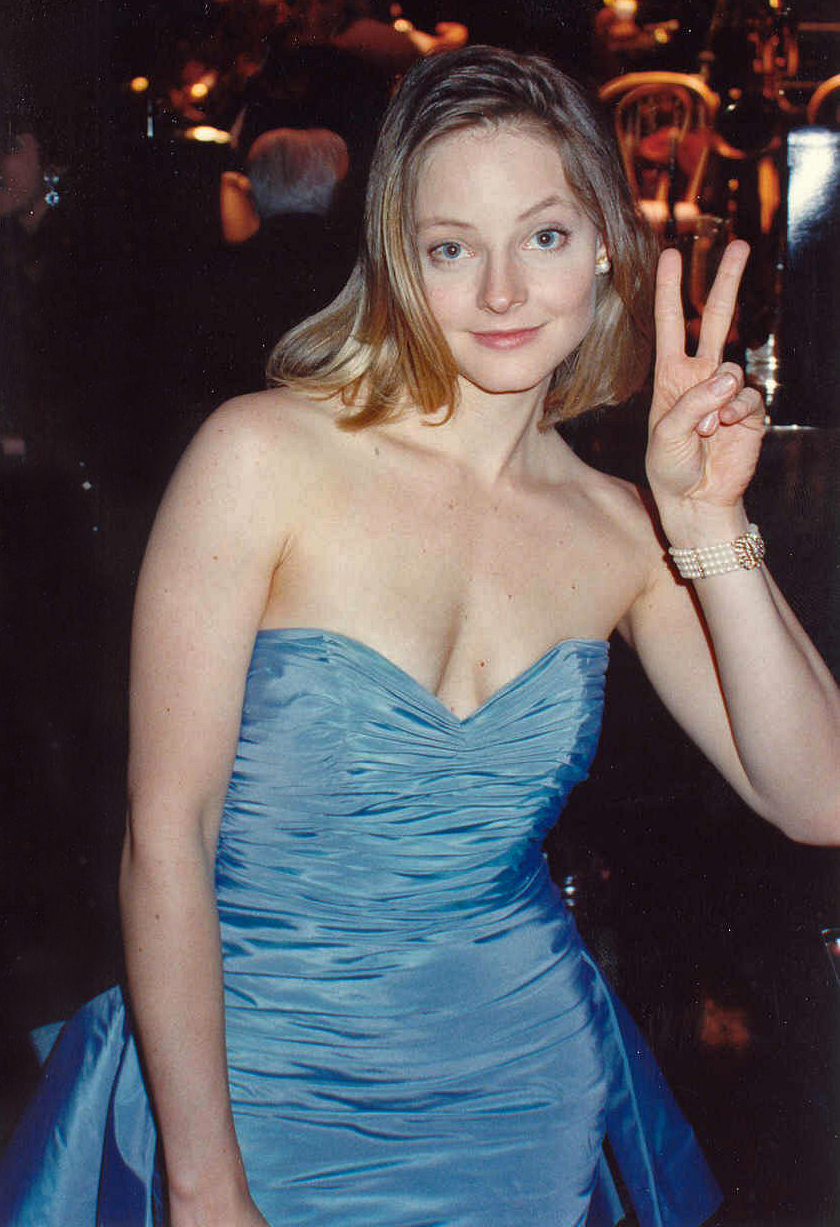
Jodie Foster in March 1989

The incident was a traumatic experience for the 18-year-old Foster, who was hounded by the media and paparazzi in its aftermath. She took a semester off at Yale and had to be escorted by a bodyguard everywhere she went. This event produced other stalkers for her, including a 22-year-old man named Edward Michael Richardson, who according to the Secret Service shared a similar obsession with Foster, and carried a loaded handgun planning to kill her, but changed his mind after watching her perform in a college play.

Hinckley demanded that Foster testify at his trial. Agreement was reached between Foster's and Hinckley's lawyers that she would do so in a closed session, with only herself, the judge (Barrington D. Parker), lawyers and Hinckley present. A videotape of this session could be introduced as evidence into Hinckley's trial. This session took place in March 1982. During her testimony, Foster did not look at or acknowledge Hinckley. This caused him to throw a pen at her and shout threats, before he was surrounded and removed from the room by U.S. marshals.

Since the attempted assassination, Foster has only commented on Hinckley on four occasions: a press conference a few days after the attack, an article she wrote for Esquire magazine in 1982 after his sentencing, during an interview with Charlie Rose on 60 Minutes II in 1999, and while speaking to the comedian and actor Marc Maron on his podcast WTF with Marc Maron in 2021. She has ended or canceled several interviews if the event was mentioned, or if she felt that an interviewer was going to bring Hinckley up. To Maron, Foster said that she voluntarily chose not to speak about the incident in interviews to avoid being labelled as an actress primarily remembered for that incident, and reflected on how her mother, a former publicist, helped her in overcoming the media frenzy, and the public's obsession with her involvement.

=== Ronald Reagan ===
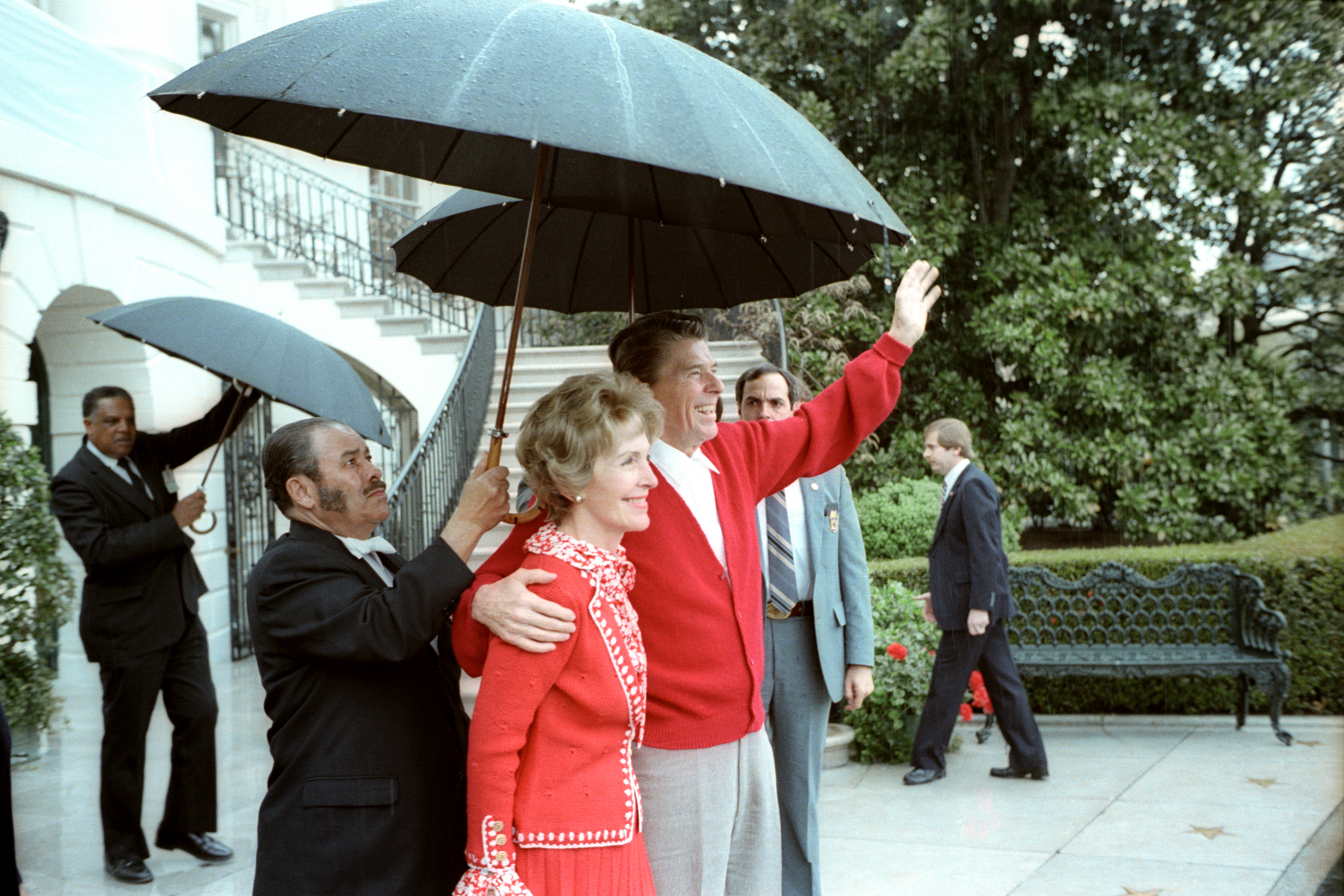
Reagan waves from the White House after his return from the hospital on April 11. He wore a bullet-resistant vest under his red sweater.

Reagan's staff members were anxious for the president to appear to be recovering quickly, and the morning after his operation he saw visitors and signed a piece of legislation. Reagan left the hospital on the morning of April 11. Entering the limousine was difficult, and he joked that the first thing he would do at home was "sit down".

Reagan's recovery speed impressed his doctors, but they advised the president not to work in the Oval Office for a week and avoid travel for several weeks. No visitors were scheduled for his first weekend. Initially, Reagan worked two hours a day in the White House's residential quarters. Reagan did not lead a Cabinet meeting until day 26, did not leave Washington until day 49, and did not hold a press conference until day 79. Ruge, the physician to the president, thought the recovery was not complete until October.

Reagan's plans for the month after the shooting were canceled, including a visit to the Mission Control Center at Lyndon B. Johnson Space Center in Houston, Texas, in April 1981 during STS-1, the first flight of the Space Shuttle. Vice President Bush instead called the orbiting astronauts during their mission. Reagan visited Mission Control during STS-2 that November.

The events contributed to Reagan's initial popularity. Though he had enjoyed approval ratings of up to 60% until March, his ratings surged to nearly 70% in the following months. Privately, Reagan believed that God had spared his life so that he might go on to fulfill a greater purpose and, although he was not a Catholic, his meetings with Mother Teresa, Cardinal Terence Cooke, and his fellow shooting-survivor Pope John Paul II reinforced his belief.

Reagan returned to the Oval Office on April 25 and received a standing ovation from staff and Cabinet members. He referred to their teamwork in his absence and insisted, "I should be applauding you." He made his first public appearance in an April 28 speech before the joint houses of Congress. In the speech, he introduced his planned spending cuts, which had been a campaign promise. He received "two thunderous standing ovations", which The New York Times deemed "a salute to his good health" as well as his programs, which the president introduced using a medical recovery theme.

Reagan installed a gym in the White House and began regularly exercising there, gaining so much muscle that he had to buy new suits. The shooting caused Nancy Reagan to fear for her husband's safety. She asked him not to run for reelection in 1984, and, because of her concerns, began consulting the astrologer Joan Quigley. Reagan never again walked across an airport tarmac, or got out of his limousine on a public sidewalk as president.

=== Delahanty, Tim McCarthy, and Brady ===
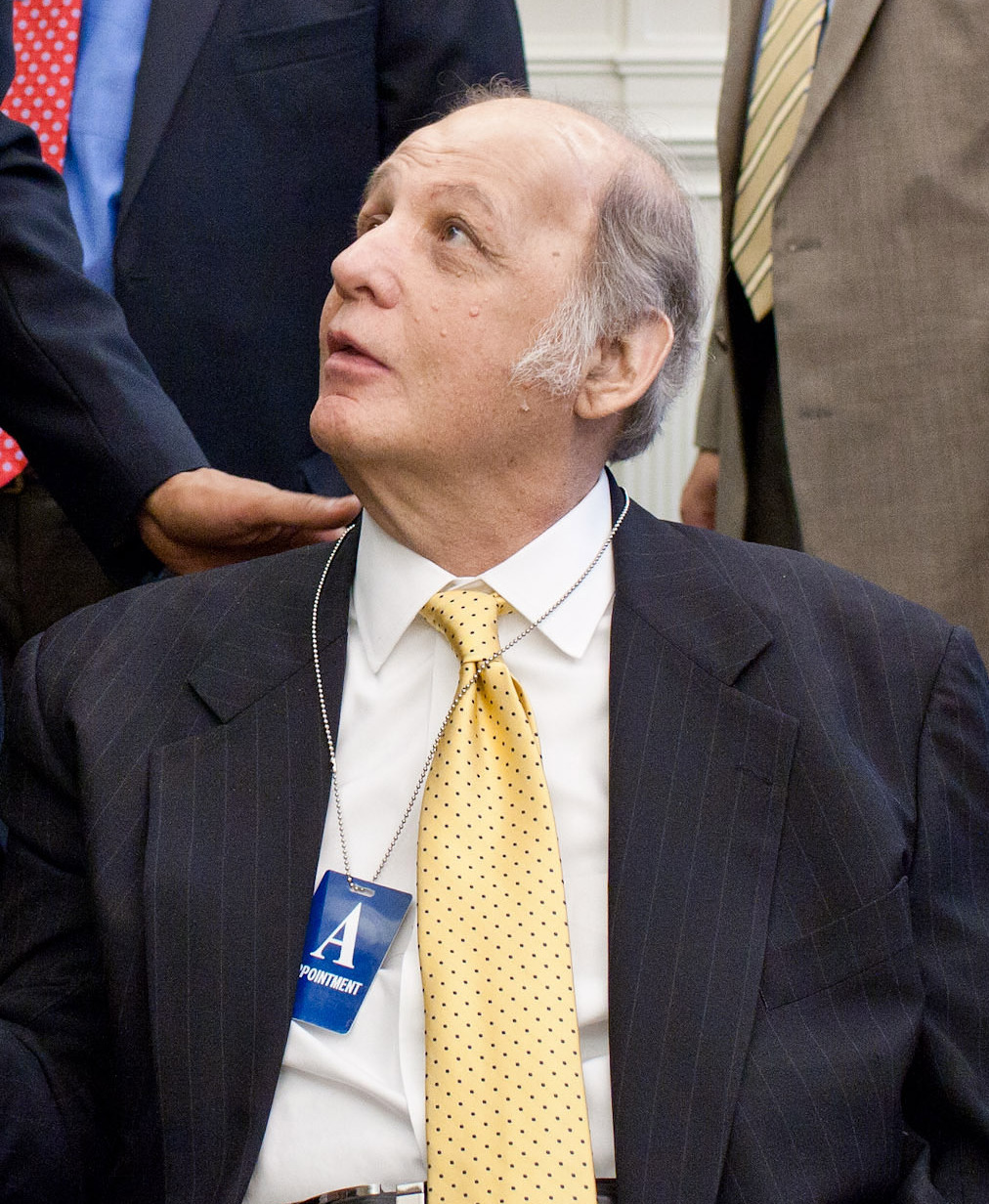
James Brady in 2011

Thomas Delahanty recovered but developed permanent nerve damage to his left arm, and was ultimately forced to retire from the Metropolitan Police Department due to his disability. Tim McCarthy recovered fully and was the first of the wounded men to be discharged from the hospital. James Brady survived, but his wound left him with slurred speech and partial paralysis that required the full-time use of a wheelchair.

Brady remained press secretary for the remainder of Reagan's administration, but this was primarily a titular role. Later, Brady and his wife Sarah became leading advocates of gun control and other actions to reduce the amount of gun violence in the United States. They became active in the lobbying organization Handgun Control, Inc.—which was eventually renamed the Brady Campaign to Prevent Gun Violence—and founded the non-profit Brady Center to Prevent Gun Violence. The Brady Handgun Violence Prevention Act was passed in 1993 as a result of their work.

Brady died on August 4, 2014, in Alexandria, Virginia, at the age of 73. Following Brady's death, the District of Columbia Medical Examiner ruled the death a homicide caused by his wounds sustained in the assassination attempt. This ruling raised the possibility that Hinckley could face additional future murder charges. However, prosecutors declined to do so for two reasons: namely, a jury had already declared Hinckley insane at the time of the shooting, and the constitutional prohibition against double jeopardy would preclude overturning this ruling on account of Brady's death.

Furthermore, Washington, D.C. was subject to the common law "year and a day" rule at the time of the shooting. Although the year and a day rule had been abolished in the district prior to 2014, the constitutional prohibition against ex post facto law would preclude the upgrading of charges for deaths resulting today from acts committed while the rule was in effect, and would prohibit the government from challenging Hinckley's successful insanity defense based on the current federal law.

The shooting of Reagan exacerbated the debate on gun control in the U.S., that began with the December 1980 handgun murder of John Lennon. Reagan expressed opposition to increased handgun control following Lennon's death and reiterated his opposition after his own shooting. However, in a speech at an event marking the assassination attempt's 10th anniversary, Reagan endorsed the Brady Act:

"Anniversary" is a word we usually associate with happy events that we like to remember: birthdays, weddings, the first job. March 30, however, marks an anniversary I would just as soon forget, but cannot... four lives were changed forever, and all by a Saturday-night special – a cheaply made .22 caliber pistol – purchased in a Dallas pawnshop by a young man with a history of mental disturbance. This nightmare might never have happened if legislation that is before Congress now – the Brady bill – had been law back in 1981... If the passage of the Brady bill were to result in a reduction of only 10 or 15 percent of those numbers (and it could be a good deal greater), it would be well worth making it the law of the land. And there would be a lot fewer families facing anniversaries such as the Bradys, Delahantys, [Tim] McCarthys and Reagans face every March 30.

In 1994, Reagan made numerous appeals to support the Federal Assault Weapons Ban in the House of Representatives. At least two representatives, Republican Scott L. Klug and Democrat Richard Swett, credit Reagan's efforts for their decision to vote for the bill, which eventually passed by a 216–214 margin.

=== Parr ===
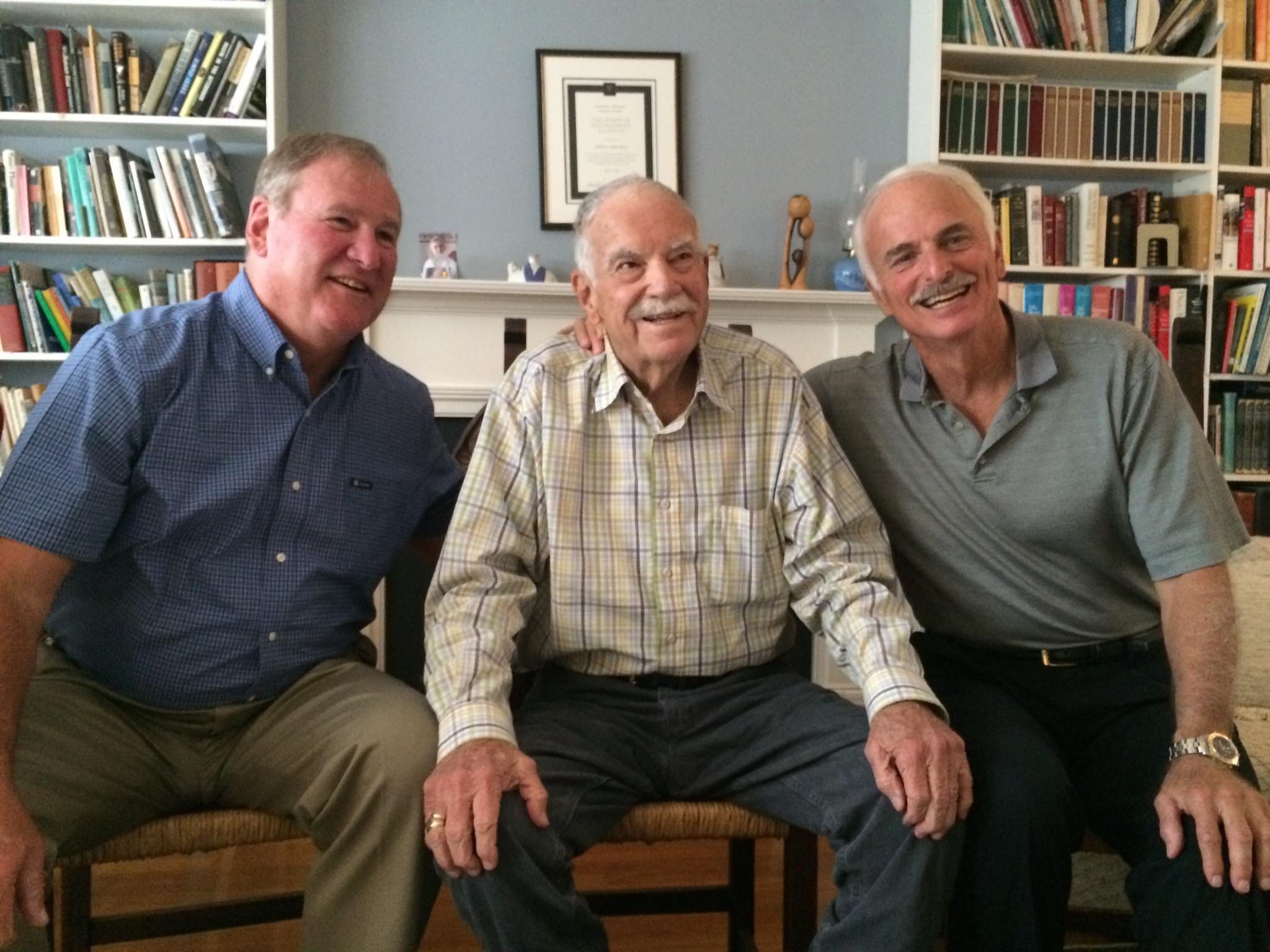
Former U.S. Secret Service agents Tim McCarthy, Jerry Parr and Ray Shaddick at Parr's home in September 2015

After the assassination attempt, Jerry Parr was hailed as a hero. He received Congressional commendations for his actions, and was named one of four "Top Cops" in the U.S. by Parade magazine. He later wrote about the assassination attempt in his autobiography, calling it both the best and the worst day of his life. Parr came to believe that God had directed his life so that he could one day save the president's life, and became a pastor after retiring from the Secret Service in 1985.^{[13]:224} He died of congestive heart failure at a hospice in Washington, D.C., on October 9, 2015, aged 85.

=== Antenucci and McNamara ===
Antenucci and McNamara both became ill following the assassination attempt. McNamara died on September 18, 1981, six months after the attempted assassination at the age of 62. Antenucci died on May 9, 1984, aged 71.

=== John Hinckley ===
Hinckley was found not guilty by reason of insanity on June 21, 1982. The defense psychiatric reports had found him to be insane while the prosecution reports declared him legally sane. Following his lawyers' advice, he declined to take the stand in his own defense. Hinckley was confined at St. Elizabeths Hospital in Washington, D.C., full-time until 2006, at which point he began a program of spending gradually more time at his mother's home.

On September 10, 2016, Hinckley was permitted to permanently leave the hospital to live with his mother full-time, under court supervision and with mandatory psychiatric treatment. After his trial, he wrote that the shooting was "the greatest love offering in the history of the world", and did not indicate any regrets at the time.

The not-guilty verdict led to widespread dismay, and, as a result, the U.S. Congress and a number of states rewrote laws regarding the insanity defense. The old Model Penal Code test was replaced by a test that shifts the burden of proof regarding a defendant's sanity from the prosecution to the defendant. Three states have abolished the defense altogether.

== See also ==
- List of United States presidential assassination attempts and plots
- 2026 White House Correspondents' Dinner shooting, a foiled assassination attempt on the administration of President Donald Trump that occurred at the same hotel
