= Thomas Delahanty =

American policeman (born c.1935)

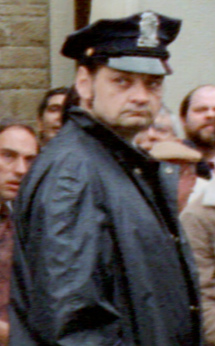
- Delahanty in 1981, moments before the shooting
- Born: Thomas K. Delahanty; January 24, 1936 (age 90); Pittsburgh, Pennsylvania, U.S.
- Spouse: Jean Marcey (died 1997)
- Police career
- Department: Metropolitan Police Department of the District of Columbia
- Service years: 1963–1981

Thomas K. Delahanty (born January 24, 1936) is an American retired police officer who served in the Metropolitan Police Department of the District of Columbia. He was one of the people wounded during the assassination attempt on US president Ronald Reagan on Monday, March 30, 1981, in Washington, D.C.

== Early life ==
Delahanty was born on January 24, 1936, in Pittsburgh, Pennsylvania. He joined the Metropolitan Police Department of the District of Columbia in September 1963 after working for Jones and Laughlin Steel (1959–1963) and serving in the United States Navy (1955–1959). When the attempted assassination of Ronald Reagan occurred in March 1981, he was 45 years old and had been a police officer for 17 years. Part of what his nephew described as "a long line of Irish cops", Delahanty was the fourth generation in his family to join the police.

== Reagan assassination attempt ==
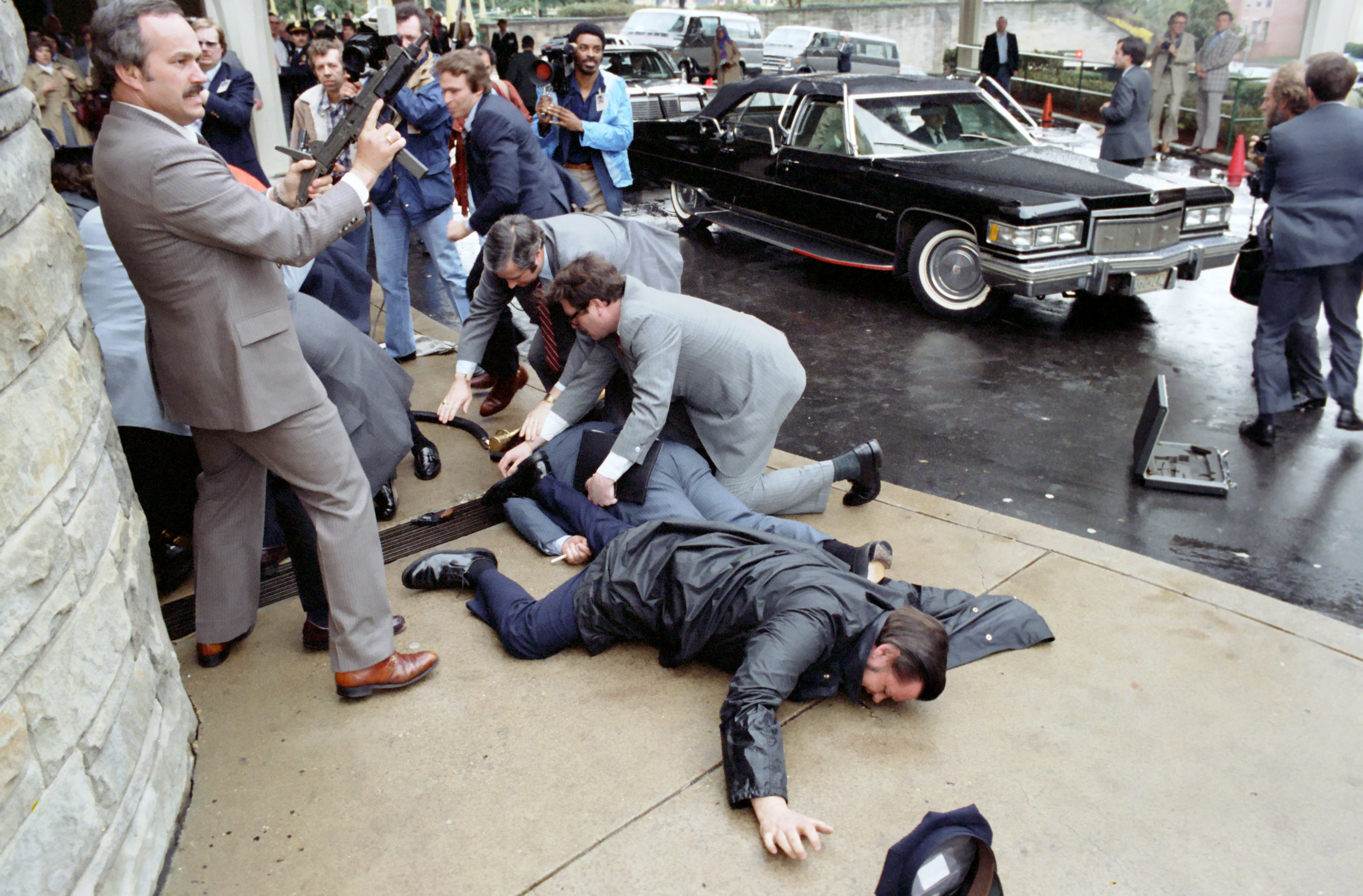
Chaos outside the Washington Hilton Hotel after the assassination attempt on President Reagan. Delahanty (with arm outstretched) and Brady lie wounded on the ground.

Delahanty was normally a K-9 officer; after his dog became ill, he volunteered to help guard President Reagan instead of taking the day off. Reagan, White House Press Secretary James Brady, and United States Secret Service agent Timothy McCarthy were also wounded in the crossfire. When John Hinckley Jr. fired the first of six bullets, striking Brady in the head and seriously wounding him, Delahanty recognized the sound as a gunshot and turned his head sharply to the left to locate Reagan. As he did so, he was struck in the back of his neck by the second shot, the bullet ricocheting off his spine.

Delahanty was taken to Washington Hospital Center. Hinckley's gun had been loaded with six "Devastator" brand cartridges, which contained small aluminum and lead azide explosive charges designed to explode on contact; the bullet that hit Brady was the only one that exploded. On April 2, after learning that the others could explode at any time, volunteer doctors wearing bulletproof vests removed the bullet from Delahanty's neck. He was sent home eleven days later on Friday, April 10, 1981, and was quoted as saying, "I feel good ... I'm ready to go."

After the assassination attempt, Delahanty was hailed as a hero, though he felt a great deal of regret for not having been able to do more. Although Delahanty recovered, the attack left him with permanent nerve damage to his left arm, and he was ultimately forced to retire from the Metropolitan Police Department due to his disability.

Delahanty later sued Hinckley, Hinckley's psychiatrist, and the gun manufacturer, Röhm Gesellschaft. His argument against the manufacturer—that small, cheap guns have no purpose except for crime, and thus the company should be held responsible—was rejected by the District of Columbia Court of Appeals.

== Personal life ==
Delahanty lives in Whitehall Borough, Pennsylvania (a suburb of Pittsburgh), after having moved from suburban Washington, D.C., after the death of his wife, Jean Marcey, in 1997.

Delahanty was interviewed in 2016 about the release of John Hinckley Jr., and responded: "That's their decision, I guess. I'm probably not too enthused with it, but what can you do?"
