= Röhm RG-14 =

German-made revolver

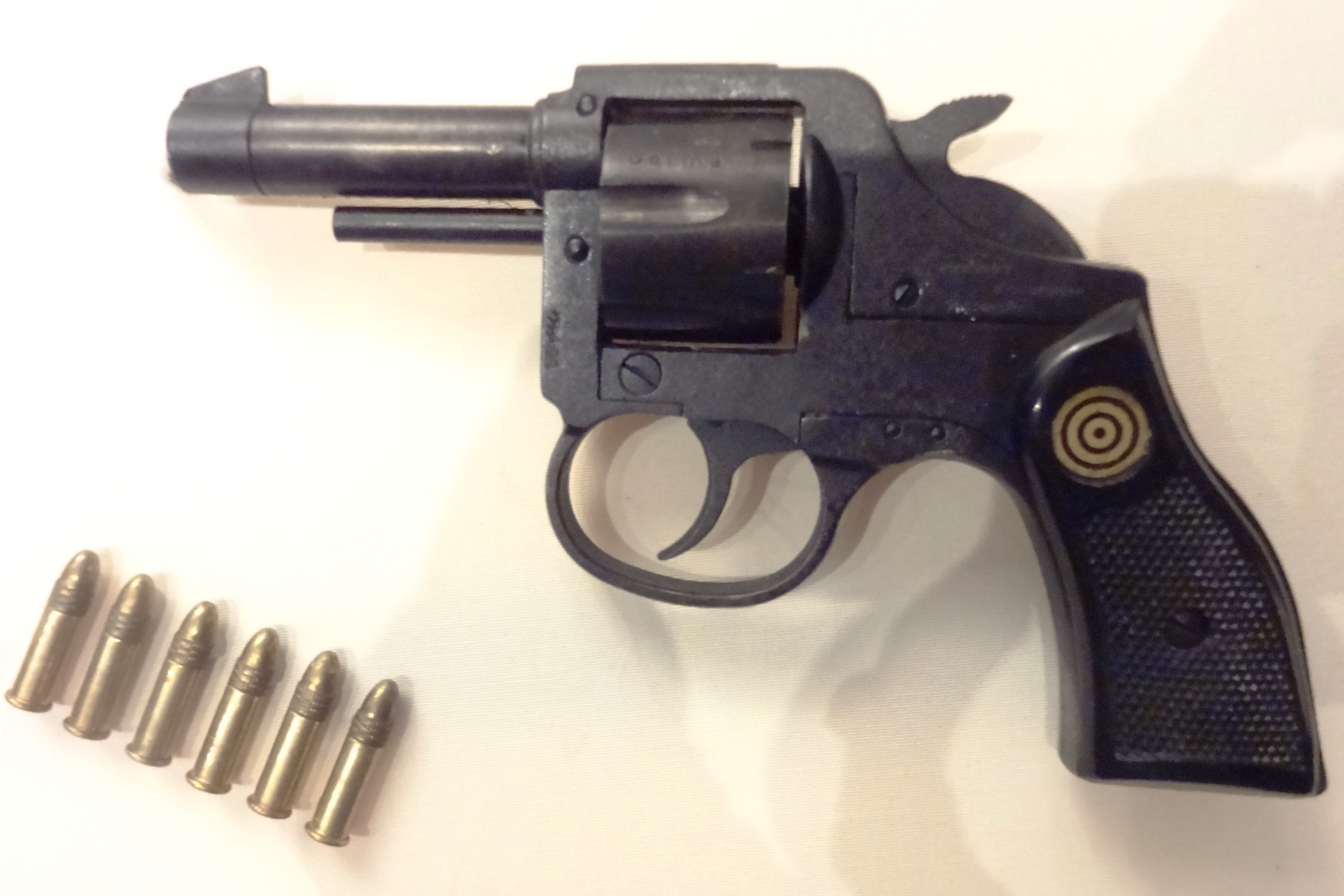
- A Röhm RG-14 displayed at the Ronald Reagan Presidential Library (Note: The gun pictured is similar to the one John Hinckley used in the attempted assassination of Ronald Reagan. However, Hinckley's actual weapon is in the possession of the US Secret Service and is not on public display.)
- Type: Revolver
- Place of origin: Germany

Production history
- Manufacturer: Röhm Gesellschaft
- Variants: 3-inch barrel; 1.5-inch barrel

Specifications
- Mass: 15.2 ounces (430 g), short-barrel version
- Length: 5 inches (130 mm), short-barrel version
- Cartridge: .22 Long Rifle

The Röhm RG-14 is a double-action, six-shot revolver chambered in .22, formerly manufactured and sold by Röhm Gesellschaft of Sontheim/Brenz, Germany.

== History ==
The Röhm RG-14 is notable for being the model of firearm used by John Hinckley Jr. to shoot Ronald Reagan on 30 March 1981.

Until 1968, the guns were manufactured in Germany. The Gun Control Act of 1968 prevented their import into the US, so subsequently they were manufactured at a Röhm factory in Miami.

The RG-14 is also known colloquially as a Saturday night special, a general category of cheap, low quality handguns.

== Design ==
The RG-14 had a swing-out cylinder that was secured to the frame by a pin that passed through its length, rather than a latch under the barrel as commonly found in double-action revolvers.

The RG-14's frame is made from zinc alloy, with a steel barrel, cylinder, hammer and trigger. It was intended to use .22 Short, Long, or Long Rifle cartridges.In order to load the weapon, the user had to unscrew and remove the pin, swing the cylinder open and insert a round into each chamber, then snap it shut and screw the pin back into place.

The RG-14 also did not have an ejector, meaning that each spent casing or unfired round had to be manually pushed out of the cylinder with the pin or a similar tool during unloading/reloading.

The RG-14 was available in a snubnose configuration with a 1.5-inch (3.8 cm) barrel as well as a more typical configuration with a 3-inch (7.6 cm) barrel.
