= Vincent J. Fuller =

American lawyer (1931–2006)

- Born: Vincent John Fuller; June 21, 1931; Ossining, New York, U.S.
- Died: July 26, 2006 (aged 75); Derwood, Maryland, U.S.
- Education: Williams College; Georgetown Law School
- Occupation: Criminal defence lawyer
- Known for: Defending John Hinckley Jr., Jimmy Hoffa, Mike Tyson
- Spouse: Beatrice Carideo (married 1957–)
- Children: 5

Vincent John Fuller (June 21, 1931 – July 26, 2006) was an American criminal defence lawyer, whose high-profile clients included John Hinckley Jr., Jimmy Hoffa and Mike Tyson.

== Biography ==
Fuller was born in Ossining, New York. His father (also called Vincent Fuller) was a municipal judge and Mayor of the town. Fuller graduated from Williams College in 1952 then served two years in the United States Navy as a communications officer on a destroyer; he served in the Pacific during the Korean War, but did not see combat. He graduated from Georgetown Law School in 1956. In 1957, he married Beatrice Carideo, and they remained married until his death in 2006.

One of Fuller's professors at Georgetown was Edward Bennett Williams, and he was eventually hired by Williams at Williams & Connolly.

In 1982, Fuller defended John Hinckley Jr., who shot and wounded President Ronald Reagan; Hinckley was found not guilty by reason of insanity to all his 13 charges. Fuller also successfully defended boxer Don King on income tax evasion charges in 1985. In 1988 he became the senior partner at Williams & Connolly after Williams' death. However he lost the 1989 case defending financier Michael Milken on charges of insider trading. In 1992, he lost the case defending boxer Mike Tyson on charges of rape.

Fuller died of lung cancer and pulmonary obstructive disease in July 2006.
