= John Hinckley Jr. =

Attempted assassin of Ronald Reagan (born 1955)

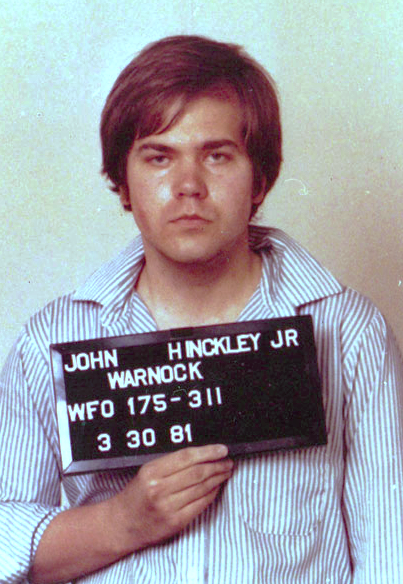
- Hinckley's mugshot on March 30, 1981
- Born: John Warnock Hinckley Jr. May 29, 1955 (age 71); Ardmore, Oklahoma, U.S.
- Status: Granted unconditional release in 2022
- Motive: Attempt to gain the attention of Jodie Foster
- Criminal charges: Attempting to kill the President; Assault on a federal officer; Use of a firearm during the commission of a federal felony; Assault with a dangerous weapon (×4); Assault with intent to kill while armed (x4); Assaulting a police officer with a deadly weapon; Carrying a pistol without the required license
- Verdict: Not guilty on all counts by reason of insanity
- Penalty: Institutionalization

Details
- Victims: 6 (4 shot, 2 stalked) (Note: Shooting: James Brady; Ronald Reagan; Thomas Delahanty; Tim McCarthy; Stalking: Jodie Foster; Jimmy Carter)
- Span of crimes: Late 1970s – 1981
- Killed: 1 (Note: Brady died of complications 33 years after the shooting in 2014.)
- Injured: 3
- Date apprehended: March 30, 1981

Signature
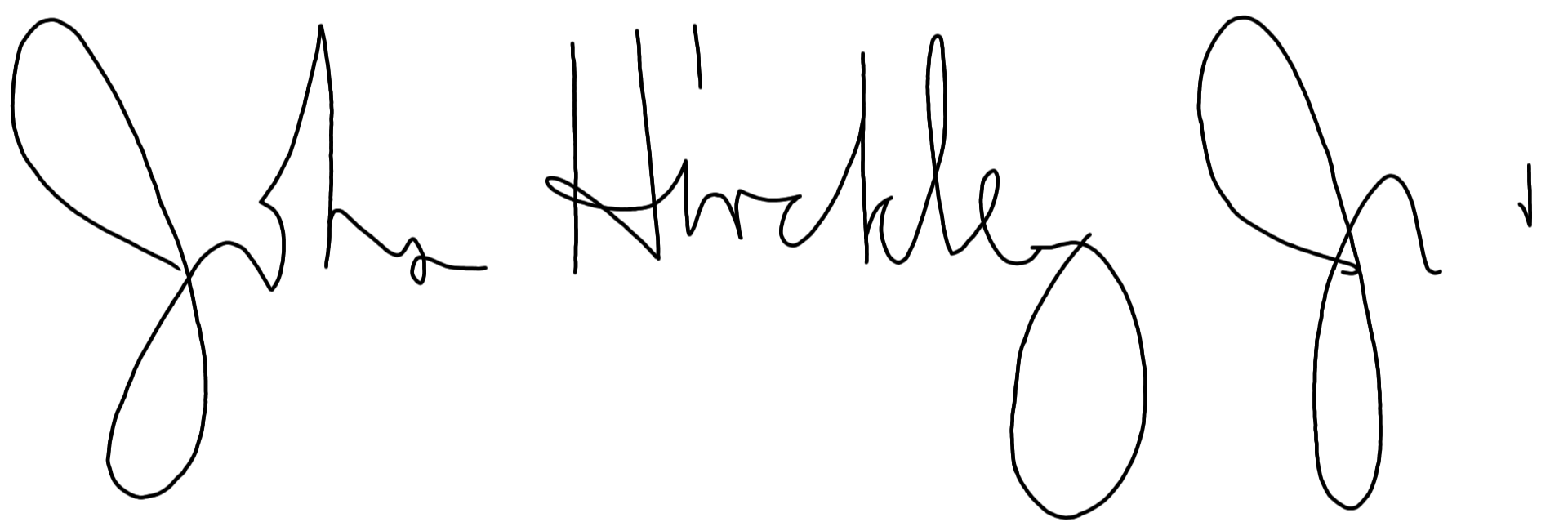

John Warnock Hinckley Jr. (born May 29, 1955) is an American man who attempted to assassinate U.S. president Ronald Reagan as he left the Hilton Hotel in Washington, D.C., on March 30, 1981, two months after Reagan's first inauguration. Using a revolver, Hinckley wounded Reagan, MPD police officer Thomas Delahanty, Secret Service agent Tim McCarthy, and White House press secretary James Brady. Brady was left disabled and died 33 years later from his injuries.

Hinckley believed that the attack would impress the actress Jodie Foster, on whom he had a fixation after watching her in Martin Scorsese's 1976 film Taxi Driver. Hinckley was found not guilty by reason of insanity and remained under institutional psychiatric care for over three decades. Public outcry over the verdict led state legislatures and Congress to narrow their respective insanity defenses.

In 2016, a federal judge ruled that Hinckley could be released from psychiatric care as he was no longer considered a threat to himself or others, albeit with many conditions. After 2020, a ruling was issued that Hinckley may showcase his artwork, writings, and music publicly under his own name, rather than anonymously as he had in the past. Since then, he has maintained a YouTube channel for his music. His restrictions were unconditionally lifted in June 2022.

In 2025, Hinckley published his full-length autobiography, John Hinckley Jr.: Who I Really Am by WildBlue Press, giving an in-depth review on his upbringing, the beginning of his fixation on Foster, the planning, occurrence, and aftermath of the shooting, his trial, institutionalization, and release.

== Early life ==
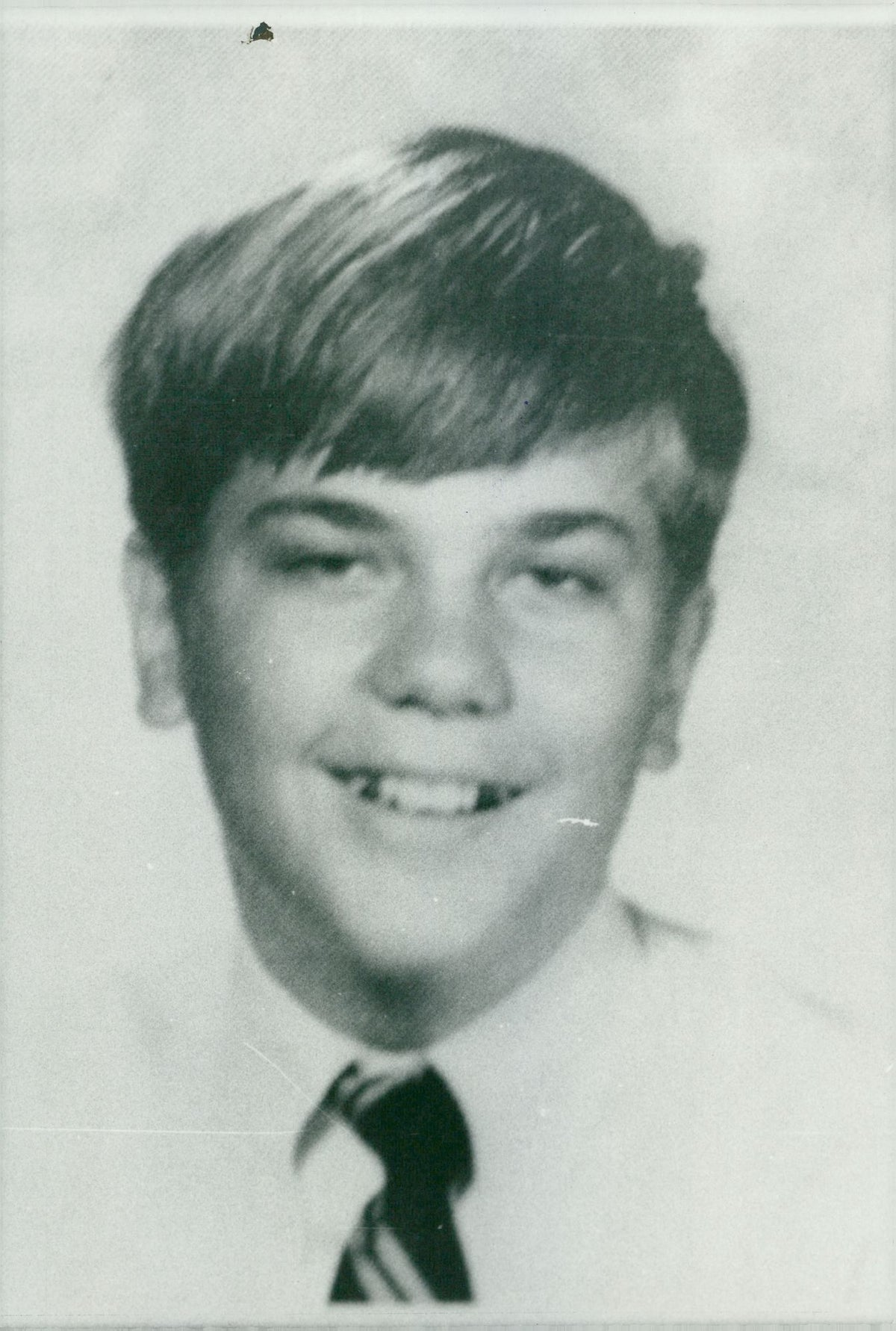
Hinckley's seventh grade yearbook photo, c. 1967–1968

John Warnock Hinckley Jr. was born on May 29, 1955, in Ardmore, Oklahoma, and moved with his wealthy family to Dallas, Texas, when he was four. Hinckley's father, John Sr. (1925–2008), was the founder, chairman, chief executive officer, and president of the Vanderbilt Energy Corporation. His mother was Jo Ann Hinckley (née Moore; 1925–2021).

John Sr. was a financial supporter of George H.W. Bush in the 1980 election campaign. Bush was Reagan's biggest rival for the Republican Party's presidential nomination. Hinckley's older brother, Scott, who became vice president of his father's oil company after graduating from college, was supposed to have dinner at Neil Bush's house the day after the assassination attempt. The connection between the two families has occasionally been used for conspiracy theories, for example by Roger Stone, an author and conservative political consultant.

Hinckley grew up in University Park, Texas, and attended Highland Park High School in Dallas County. After he graduated from high school in 1973, his family, owners of the Hinckley oil company, moved to Evergreen, Colorado, where the new company headquarters was located. Hinckley was an off-and-on student at Texas Tech University from 1974 to 1980, but eventually dropped out.

In 1975, Hinckley went to Los Angeles in the hope of becoming a songwriter. His efforts were unsuccessful, and Hinckley wrote to his parents with tales of misfortune and pleas for money. Hinckley spoke of a girlfriend, Lynn Collins, who turned out to be a fabrication. In September 1976, he returned to his parents' home in Evergreen.

In the late 1970s and early 1980s, Hinckley began purchasing weapons and practicing with them. He was prescribed antidepressants and tranquilizers to deal with his emotional problems.

== Obsession with Jodie Foster ==
Hinckley became obsessed with the 1976 film Taxi Driver, in which disturbed protagonist Travis Bickle (Robert De Niro) plots to assassinate a presidential candidate. Bickle was partly based on the diaries of Arthur Bremer, who attempted to assassinate George Wallace. Hinckley developed an infatuation with Iris, a sexually trafficked 12-year-old child, played by Jodie Foster. Hinckley began to adopt the dress and mannerisms of the Travis Bickle character.

When Foster entered Yale University, Hinckley moved to New Haven, Connecticut, for a short time to stalk her. His parents had given him funds to attend a writing course at Yale. Hinckley never enrolled in the course, but instead used the money to support himself while sending Foster love letters and romantic poems, and repeatedly calling and leaving her messages.

Failing to develop any meaningful contact with Foster, Hinckley fantasized about conducting an aircraft hijacking or killing himself in front of her to get her attention. Eventually, he settled on a scheme to impress her by assassinating the president, thinking that by achieving a place in history, he would appeal to her as an equal. Hinckley trailed President Jimmy Carter from state to state during his campaign for the 1980 United States presidential election and got to within twenty feet (six meters) of him at a rally at Dayton, Ohio.

On October 9, 1980, Hinckley was in Nashville, Tennessee, on the same day Carter was visiting the city. Hinckley was arrested at Nashville International Airport while trying to board a flight to New York with handcuffs and three unloaded guns in his hand-luggage. The airport police handed him over to the Metropolitan Nashville Police Department. Hinckley's guns and handcuffs were confiscated, and he was fined $50 plus court costs. He was released later the same day.

After Nashville, Hinckley flew to Dallas. On October 13, he bought more guns from a Dallas pawn shop. They included the .22 caliber Röhm RG-14 revolver that he used five months later to attempt the assassination of Reagan. The $3,600 from Hinckley's parents was now exhausted and he returned home penniless. Hinckley spent four months undergoing psychiatric treatment for depression, but his mental health did not improve. In 1981, Hinckley began to target the newly elected president Ronald Reagan. For this purpose, he collected material on the assassination of John F. Kennedy. On January 20, 1981, the day of Reagan's inauguration, Hinckley was present outside St. John's Episcopal Church in Washington, D.C., where Reagan attended a pre-inaugural church service, and was later recognized by an officer who had observed him there.

== Ronald Reagan assassination attempt ==
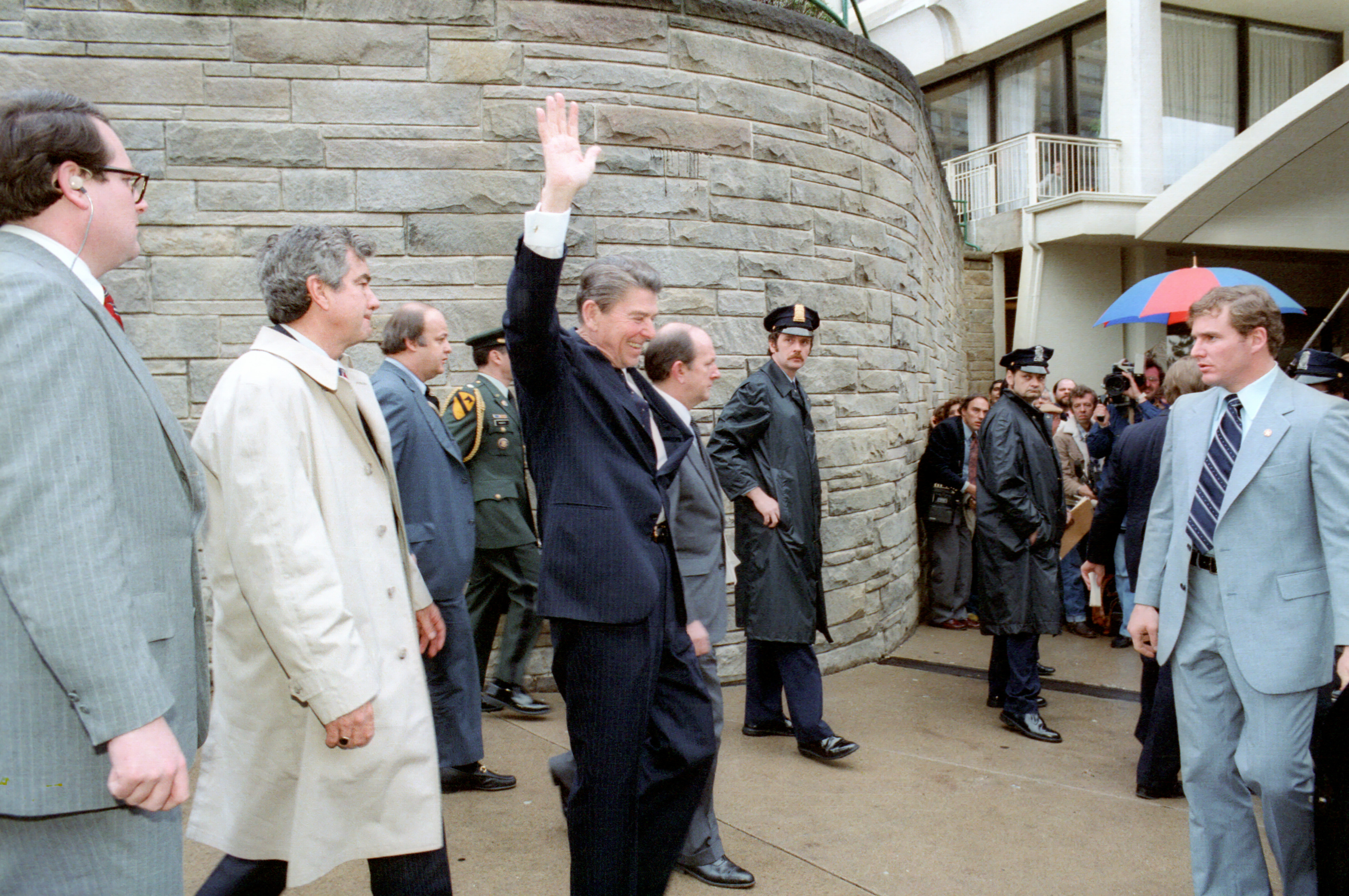
Ronald Reagan waves just before he is shot. From left are advance man Rick Ahearn; Jerry Parr, in a white trench coat, who pushed Reagan into the limousine; press secretary James Brady, who was seriously wounded by a gunshot to the head; Reagan; aide Michael Deaver; an unidentified policeman; policeman Thomas Delahanty, who was shot in the neck; and secret service agent Tim McCarthy, who was shot in the chest.

Hinckley arrived in Washington, D.C. on March 29, 1981, after travelling by Greyhound bus from Los Angeles. He spent the night in a hotel. The next morning, he read President Reagan's itinerary in a newspaper and discovered that later that day, Reagan was to be at the Hilton Hotel to address an AFL–CIO conference. Hinckley spent the morning composing a letter to Jodie Foster.

Over the past seven months I've left you dozens of poems, letters and love messages in the faint hope that you could develop an interest in me. Although we talked on the phone a couple of times I never had the nerve to simply approach you and introduce myself. ... The reason I'm going ahead with this attempt now is because I cannot wait any longer to impress you.

— Excerpt from Hinckley's March 30 letter

After finishing the letter, he took a taxi to the Hilton Hotel.

At 2:27 p.m. EST, Hinckley was among a crowd of several hundred outside the hotel. He was carrying his Röhm revolver. When Reagan emerged from the hotel, Hinckley shot all six of the bullets in the gun at Reagan. The first shot critically wounded press secretary James Brady while the second wounded police officer Thomas Delahanty. The third shot missed, but the fourth hit Secret Service agent Timothy McCarthy, who was deliberately standing in the line-of-fire to shield Reagan. The fifth bullet struck the armored glass of the presidential limousine. The sixth seriously wounded Reagan, when it ricocheted off the side of the limousine and hit him in the chest.

Alfred Antenucci, a Cleveland, Ohio, labor official who stood near Hinckley and saw him firing, hit Hinckley in the head and pulled him to the ground. Within two seconds, agent Dennis McCarthy (no relation to agent Timothy McCarthy) dove onto Hinckley, intent on protecting Hinckley, to avoid what happened to Lee Harvey Oswald, who was killed before he could be tried for the assassination of President Kennedy. Another Cleveland-area labor official, Frank J. McNamara, joined Antenucci and started punching Hinckley in the head, striking him so hard he drew blood.

As a result of the shooting, Brady endured a long recuperation period, remaining paralyzed on the left side of his body, until his death on August 4, 2014. Brady's death was ruled a homicide 33 years after the shooting.

== Trial ==
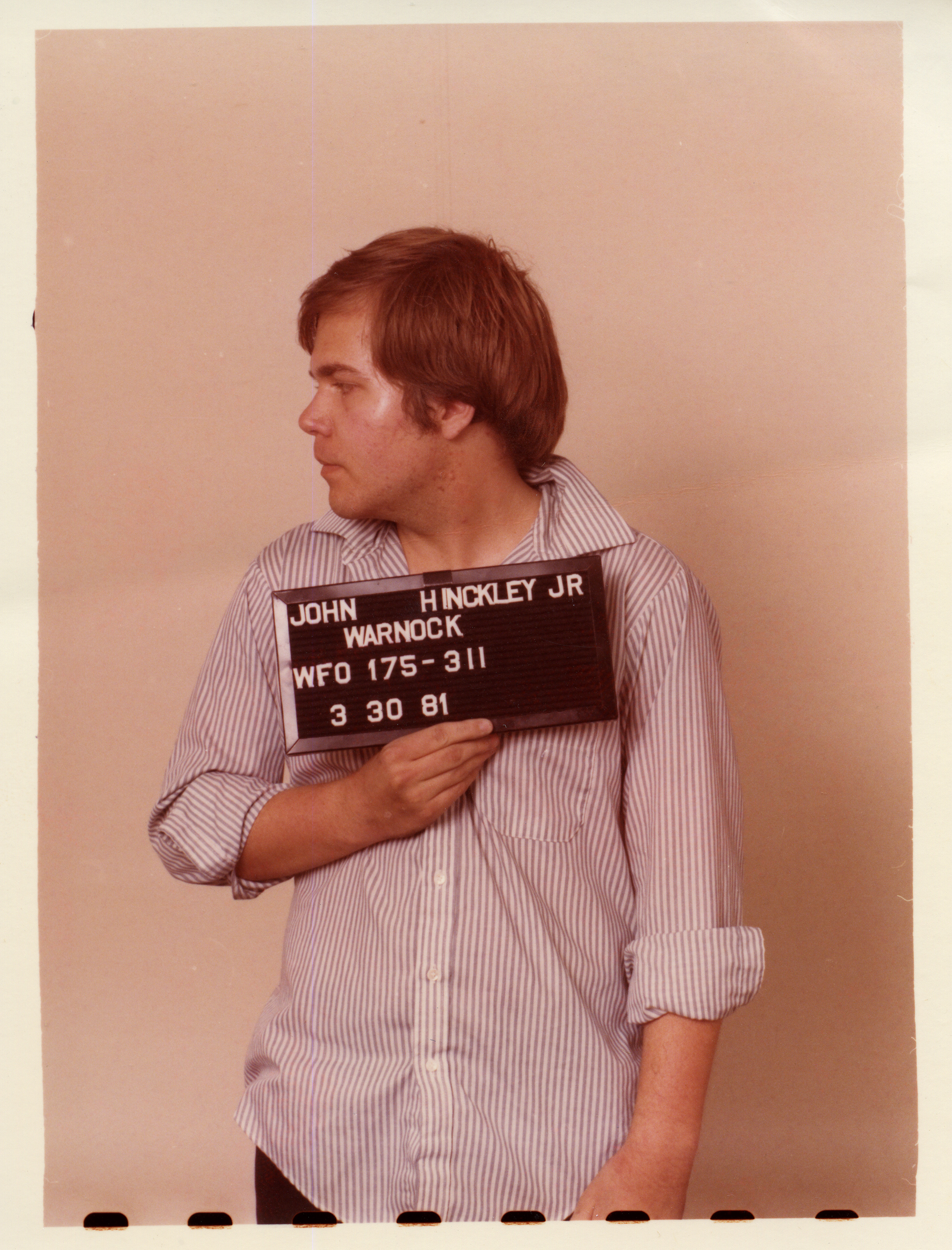
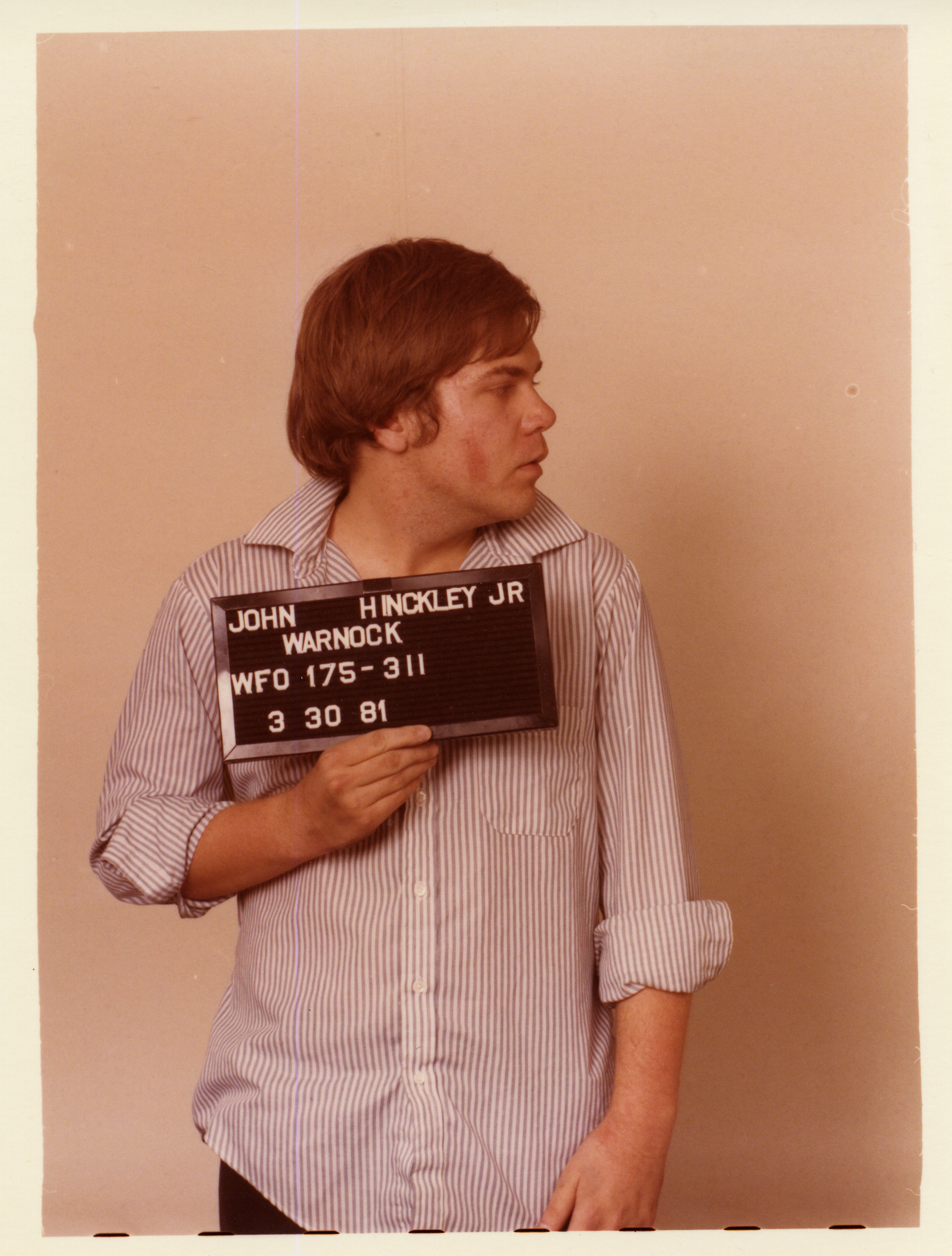
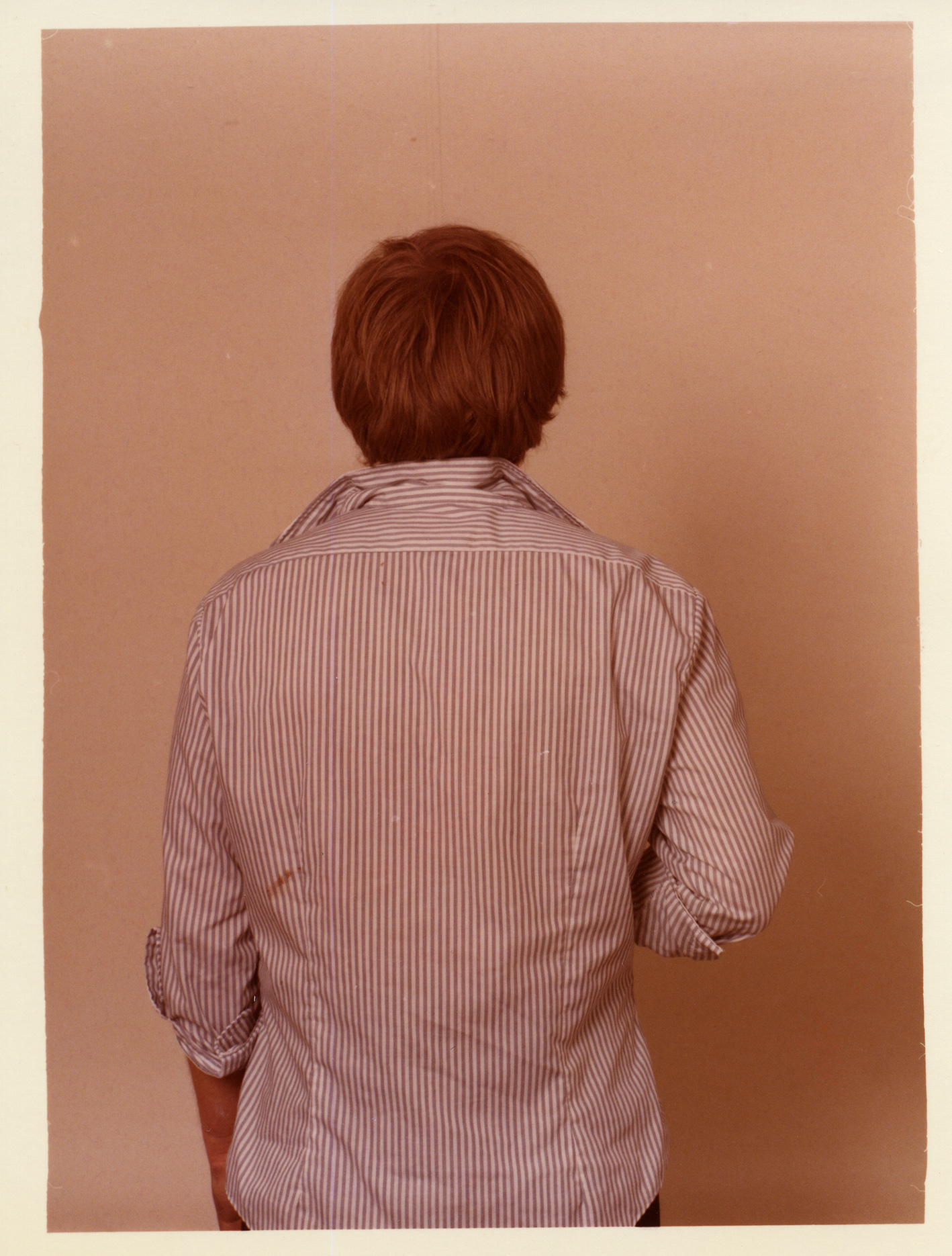
Some of Hinckley's many mugshots from the day after his arrest, from the Ronald Reagan Presidential Library.

Hinckley was initially held at Marine Corps Base Quantico, where he met his defense lawyer Vincent J. Fuller. Hinckley was quickly moved to Federal Correctional Complex, Butner. For four months, he was interviewed by both prosecution and defense. During his incarceration, he tried to kill himself twice, in May 1981 and again the following November.

At trial, the government emphasized Hinckley's premeditation of the shooting: noting that he had purchased a gun, trailed President Reagan, traveled to Washington, D.C., left a note detailing his plan, selected particularly devastating ammunition, and fired six shots. The defense argued that Hinckley's actions and his obsession with Foster indicated that he was legally insane. The trial was chiefly devoted to a battle of the psychiatric experts concerning Hinckley's mental state. Because Hinckley was charged in federal court, the prosecution was required to prove his sanity beyond reasonable doubt.

For the defense, William T. Carpenter, who diagnosed Hinckley with schizophrenia, testified for three days, opining that Hinckley had amalgamated various personalities from fiction and real life—including Travis Bickle (from Taxi Driver) and John Lennon. Carpenter concluded that Hinckley could not emotionally appreciate the wrongfulness of his actions because he was consumed by the prospect of a "magical unification with Jodie Foster". David Bear testified that Hinckley's actions followed "the very opposite of logic" and that Hinckley did not exhibit signs of malingering. Bear said that his opinion was in part supported by a CAT scan of Hinckley's brain showing widened sulci, a feature Bear said was found in 1/3 of persons with schizophrenia, but only two percent of non-schizophrenics. Similarly, Ernest Prelinger testified that, while Hinckley had an above-average IQ, his results on the Minnesota Multiphasic Personality Inventory were highly abnormal—specifically, Prelinger said that only one person out of a million with Hinckley's score would not be suffering from serious mental illness.

For the prosecution, Park Dietz testified that he had diagnosed Hinckley with dysthymia and three types of personality disorders: narcissistic, schizoid, and mixed, with borderline, and passive-aggressive features. Dietz found that none of these illnesses rendered Hinckley legally insane. His report said that there was "no evidence that [Hinckley] was so impaired that he could not appreciate the wrongfulness of his conduct or conform his conduct to the requirements of the law". Sally Johnson, a psychiatrist in the federal prison who interviewed Hinckley more than any other doctor, emphasized that Hinckley had planned the shooting and that he was preoccupied with being famous. Johnson said that Hinckley's interest in Foster was no different than any young man's interest in a movie star.

The insanity instruction provided to the Hinckley jurors was based on the American Law Institute's Model Penal Code:

The burden is on the Government to prove beyond a reasonable doubt either that the defendant was not suffering from a mental disease or defect on March 30, 1981, or else that he nevertheless had substantial capacity on that date both to conform his conduct to the requirements of the law and to appreciate the wrongfulness of his conduct.

— Jury instructions.

The jury deliberated for a total of 24 hours over the course of four days. On June 21, 1982, Hinckley was found not guilty by reason of insanity of all his 13 charges.

=== Aftermath ===
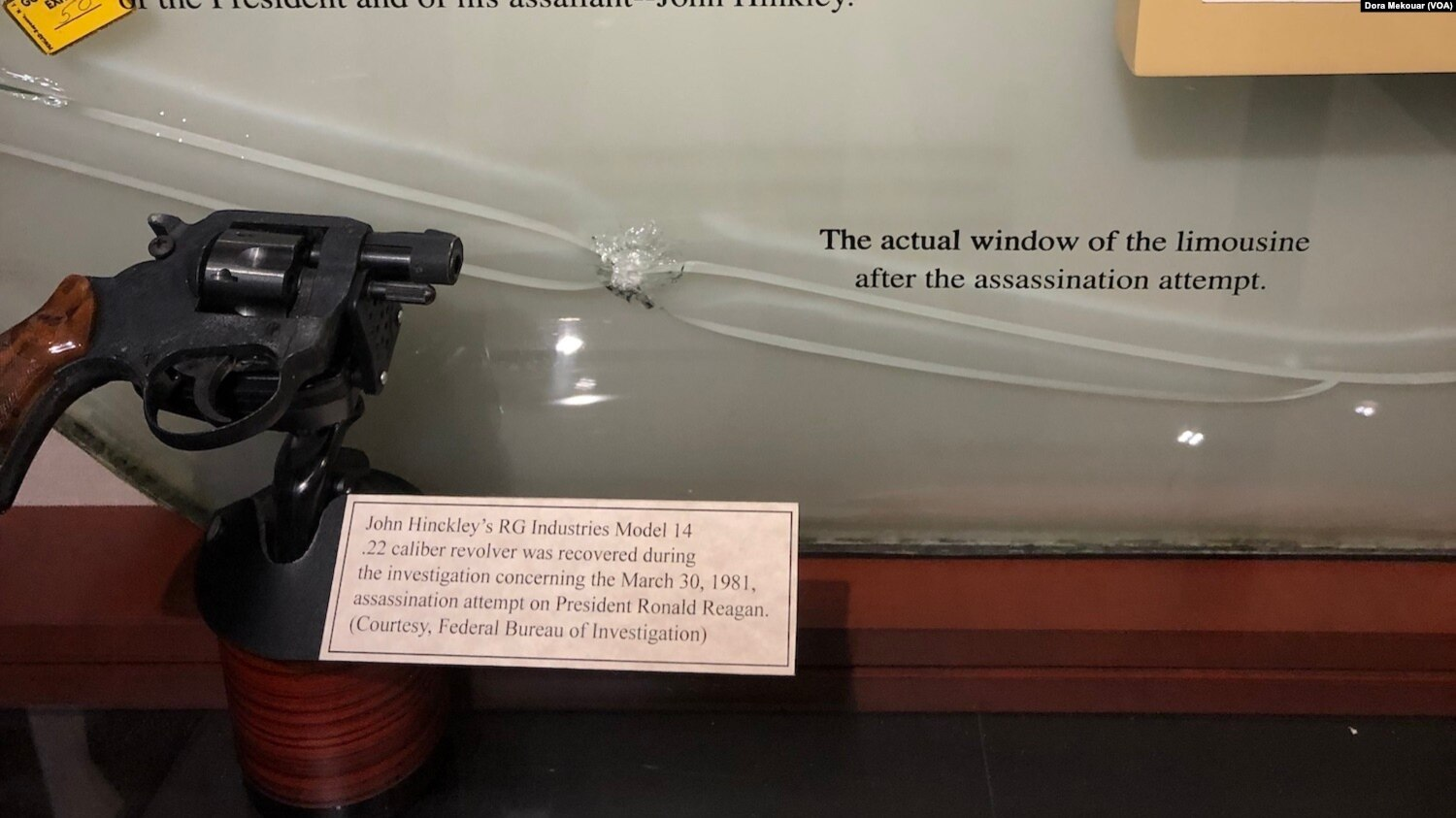
Hinckley's Röhm RG-14 revolver that he bought in Dallas. Behind it is the armored-glass limousine window hit by one of its bullets, on display at the US Secret Service's restricted-access museum, 2022.

Soon after his trial, Hinckley wrote that the shooting was "the greatest love offering in the history of the world" and was disappointed that Foster did not reciprocate his love. In 1985, Hinckley's parents wrote Breaking Points, a book detailing their son's mental condition.

On August 4, 2014, James Brady died. Because the medical examiner determined his death to be a result of the "gunshot wound and consequences thereof", it was labeled a homicide. Hinckley did not face charges as a result of Brady's death because he had been found not guilty of the original crime by reason of insanity. Additionally, since Brady's death occurred more than 33 years after the shooting, prosecution of Hinckley was barred under the year and a day law in effect in the District of Columbia at the time of the shooting.

==== Effect on insanity defenses ====
Before the Hinckley case, the insanity defense had been used in less than 2% of all American felony cases and was unsuccessful in almost 75% of those trials. Created in 1962, the Model Penal Code's insanity test broadened the then-dominant M'Naghten test. By 1981, it was adopted in 10 of the 11 federal circuits and a majority of the states. As a consequence of public outcry over the Hinckley verdict, the United States Congress and a number of states enacted legislation making the insanity defense more restrictive. Congress rejected the Model Penal Code test, and by 2006, only 14 states retained it. Eighty percent of insanity-defense reforms between 1978 and 1990 occurred shortly after the Hinckley verdict. In addition to restricting eligibility for the defense, many of these reforms shifted the burden of proof to the defendant.

For the first time, Congress passed a law stipulating the insanity test to be used in all federal criminal trials, the Insanity Defense Reform Act of 1984. The IDRA excised the Model Penal Code's volitional element in favor of an exclusively cognitive test, affording the insanity defense to a defendant who can show that, "at the time of the commission of the acts constituting the offense, the defendant, as a result of a severe mental disease or defect, was unable to appreciate the nature and quality or the wrongfulness of his acts". At the state level, Idaho, Kansas, Montana, and Utah abolished the defense altogether.

Hinckley's acquittal led to the popularization of the "guilty but mentally ill" (GBMI) verdict, typically used when a defendant's mental illness did not result in sufficient impairment to warrant insanity. A defendant receiving a GBMI verdict generally receives an identical sentence to a defendant receiving a guilty verdict, but the designation allows for a medical evaluation and treatment. Studies have suggested that jurors often favor a GBMI verdict, considering it to be a compromise.

Changes in federal and some state rules of evidence laws have since excluded or restricted the use of testimony of an expert witness, such as a psychologist or psychiatrist, regarding conclusions on "ultimate" issues in insanity defense cases, including whether a criminal defendant is legally "insane", but this is not the rule in most states.

== Treatment ==
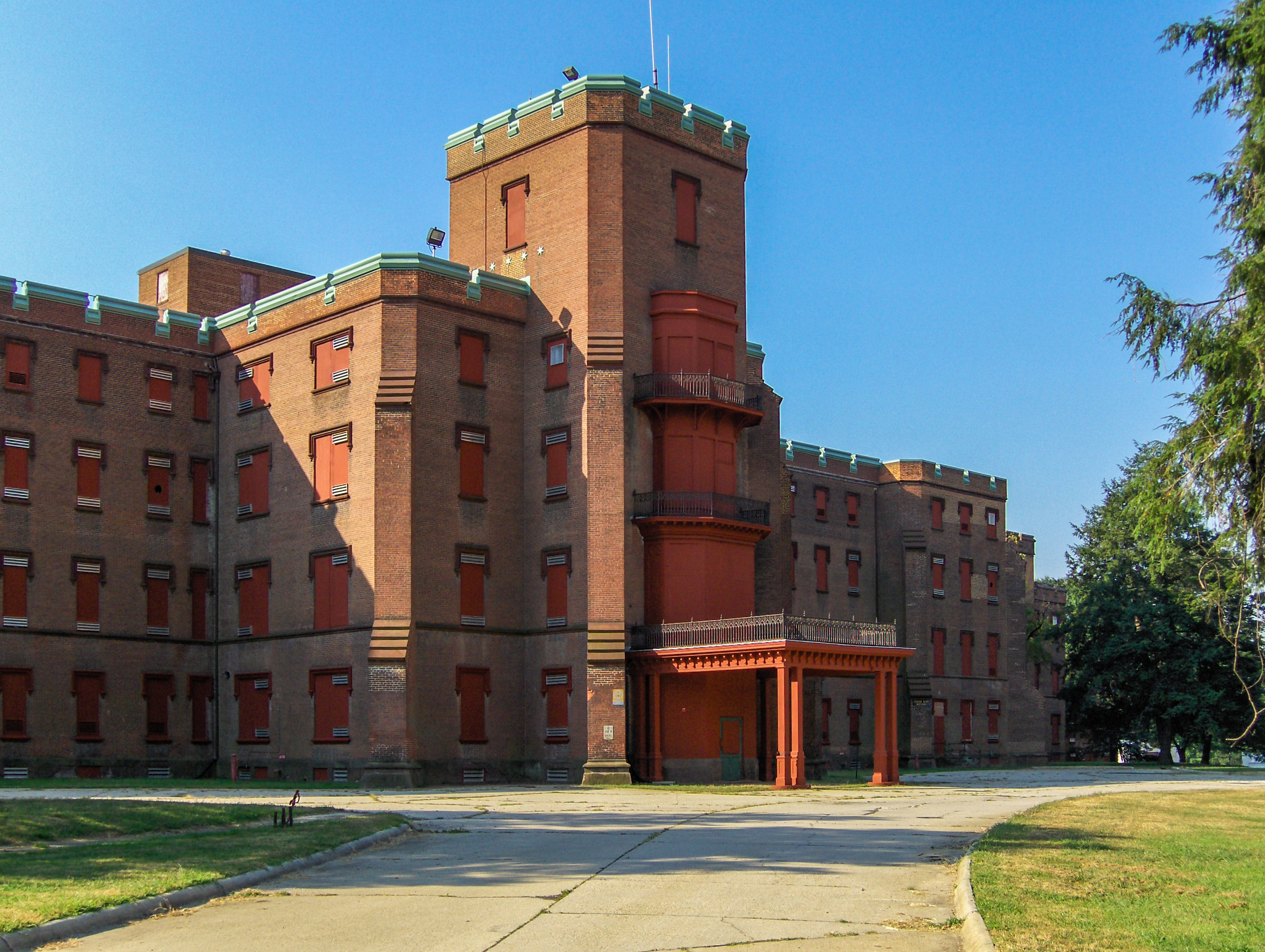
The Center Building at St. Elizabeths in 2006

Hinckley was confined at St. Elizabeths Hospital in Washington, D.C. After being admitted, tests found that he was an "unpredictably dangerous" man who might harm himself or any third party. In 1983, Hinckley told Penthouse that on a normal day, he would "see a therapist, answer mail, play guitar, listen to music, play pool, watch television, eat lousy food and take delicious medication".

Around 1986, Hinckley and the hospital began seeking various conditional releases, which required judicial authorization. The Reagan family frequently spoke out against these requests. In 1986, a judge denied Hinckley's request to be transferred to a less restrictive ward. The following year, the hospital requested that Hinckley be given a 12-hour unescorted pass, allowing Hinckley to visit his parents on Easter. Glenn Miller, who had performed the initial evaluation of Hinckley, testified, "I do not believe he's suicidal, I do not believe he's a danger to Jodie Foster, I do not believe he's a danger to Mr. Reagan or Mr. Brady."

However, Miller also revealed that Hinckley had written to serial killer Ted Bundy, sought the address of Charles Manson, and received a letter from Manson family member Lynette Fromme. The hospital subsequently withdrew the request for "administrative" reasons, though it emphasized that the "clinical" assessment was unchanged. In 1992, Hinckley again submitted a request for additional privileges, but he later withdrew that request. During this period, St. Elizabeths gradually expanded Hinckley's privileges, by allowing off-site trips under custodial supervision.

In 2003, Hinckley, for the first time, received judicial approval for a release proposal: six local day visits under the supervision of his parents and, upon the successful completion and evaluation of those day visits, two local overnight visits under parental supervision. On June 17, 2009, Judge Friedman ruled that Hinckley would be permitted to visit his mother for a dozen visits of 10 days at a time, rather than six, to spend more time outside of the hospital, and to have a driver's license. The court ordered that Hinckley be required to carry a GPS-enabled cell phone to track him whenever he was outside of his parents' home. He was prohibited from speaking with the news media. Prosecutors objected to this ruling, saying that Hinckley was still a danger to others and had unhealthy and inappropriate thoughts about women. Hinckley had recorded a song, "Ballad of an Outlaw", which the prosecutors claimed was "reflecting suicide and lawlessness".

On March 29, 2011, the day before the 30th anniversary of the assassination attempt, Hinckley's attorney filed a court petition requesting more freedom for his client, including additional unsupervised visits to the Virginia home of Hinckley's mother, Jo Ann. On November 30, a hearing in Washington was held to consider whether he could live full-time outside the hospital. The Justice Department opposed this, stating that Hinckley still posed a danger to the public. Justice Department counsel argued that Hinckley had been known to deceive his doctors in the past. By December 2013, the court ordered that visits be extended to his mother, who lives near Williamsburg. Hinckley was permitted up to eight 17-day visits, with evaluation after the completion of each one.

Hinckley has been prescribed sertraline (Zoloft) and risperidone (Risperdal).

=== Release and later activities ===
On July 27, 2016, a federal judge ruled that Hinckley could be released from St. Elizabeths on August 5, as he was no longer considered a threat to himself or others. Patti Davis, one of Reagan's daughters, and then-presidential candidate Donald Trump, both denounced the decision to grant Hinckley unsupervised release. The former president's son and namesake, Ron Reagan Jr., was strongly critical as well, noting that during one of his first unsupervised trips into public, Hinckley had visited a local bookstore to peruse a book about political assassinations. Hinckley's activity at the bookstore was documented by an undercover agent of the Secret Service, which maintains him under constant surveillance.

Hinckley was released from institutional psychiatric care on September 10, 2016, with many conditions—including that he was required to live full-time at his mother's home in Williamsburg, Virginia, to work at least three days a week and record his browser history. He was also prohibited from a variety of activities, including contacting the Reagan, Brady, or Foster families; watching or listening to violent media; accessing pornography; and speaking to the press. In November 2018, Judge Friedman ruled Hinckley could move out of his mother's house in Virginia and live on his own, upon location approval from his doctors.

In September 2019, Hinckley's attorney stated that he planned to ask for full, unconditional release from the court orders that determined how he could live by the end of 2019. On September 27, 2021, a federal judge approved Hinckley for unconditional release, beginning June 2022. Michael Reagan, Reagan's son, spoke out in favor of the decision, while Davis again denounced it. On June 15, 2022, Hinckley was fully released from court restrictions. In a June 2022 interview with CBS, Hinckley expressed remorse for his actions, and apologized to the Reagan and Brady families, as well as Jodie Foster.

On July 17, 2024, following the attempted assassination of Donald Trump, Hinckley tweeted, "Violence is not the way to go. Give peace a chance." On April 26, 2026, following the White House Correspondents' Dinner shooting, Hinckley criticized the lack of security at the Washington Hilton and stated it was "spooky" that another such incident "took place at the same hotel as mine did."

== Music ==
As a young adult, Hinckley made unsuccessful efforts to become a songwriter. Years later, he posted music online anonymously but received little interest. In October 2020, a federal court ruled that Hinckley may showcase and market his artwork, writings, and music publicly under his own name, but his treatment team could rescind the display privilege. Hinckley created a YouTube channel where, since December 2020, he has posted videos of himself performing original songs with a guitar and covers of songs such as "Blowin' in the Wind" by Bob Dylan, and the Elvis Presley song "Can't Help Falling in Love".

In January 2022, Hinckley announced that he was looking for members for his own band. On June 15, 2022, after his restrictions were unconditionally lifted, it was announced that what would have been Hinckley's first live performance in front of a physically present audience at a Brooklyn, New York, venue had been canceled over security concerns for "vulnerable communities" after it had received threats. Three other planned concerts that summer, in Chicago, Hamden, Connecticut, and Williamsburg, Virginia were cancelled because of threats to the venues. In July 2022, Asbestos Records decided to release some of Hinckley's songs on vinyl later that year. The album was released on July 12, 2023.

Following his release, Hinckley took up painting, using his pet cat as a subject. As of May 2023, he had sold several pieces on eBay. In December 2024, Hinckley announced that he would open a music store in Williamsburg, Virginia, but those plans were quickly scrapped by Hinckley due to negative publicity and security concerns.

== See also ==
- United States federal laws governing defendants with mental diseases or defects
- John Schrank (attempted Theodore Roosevelt 1912)
- Samuel Byck (attempted Nixon 1974)
- Lynette Fromme (attempted Ford 1975)
- Sara Jane Moore (attempted Ford 1975)
- Vladimir Arutyunian (attempted Bush 2005)
- Thomas Crooks (attempted Trump 2024)
