= Rope line =

Setting for celebrity/fans interaction

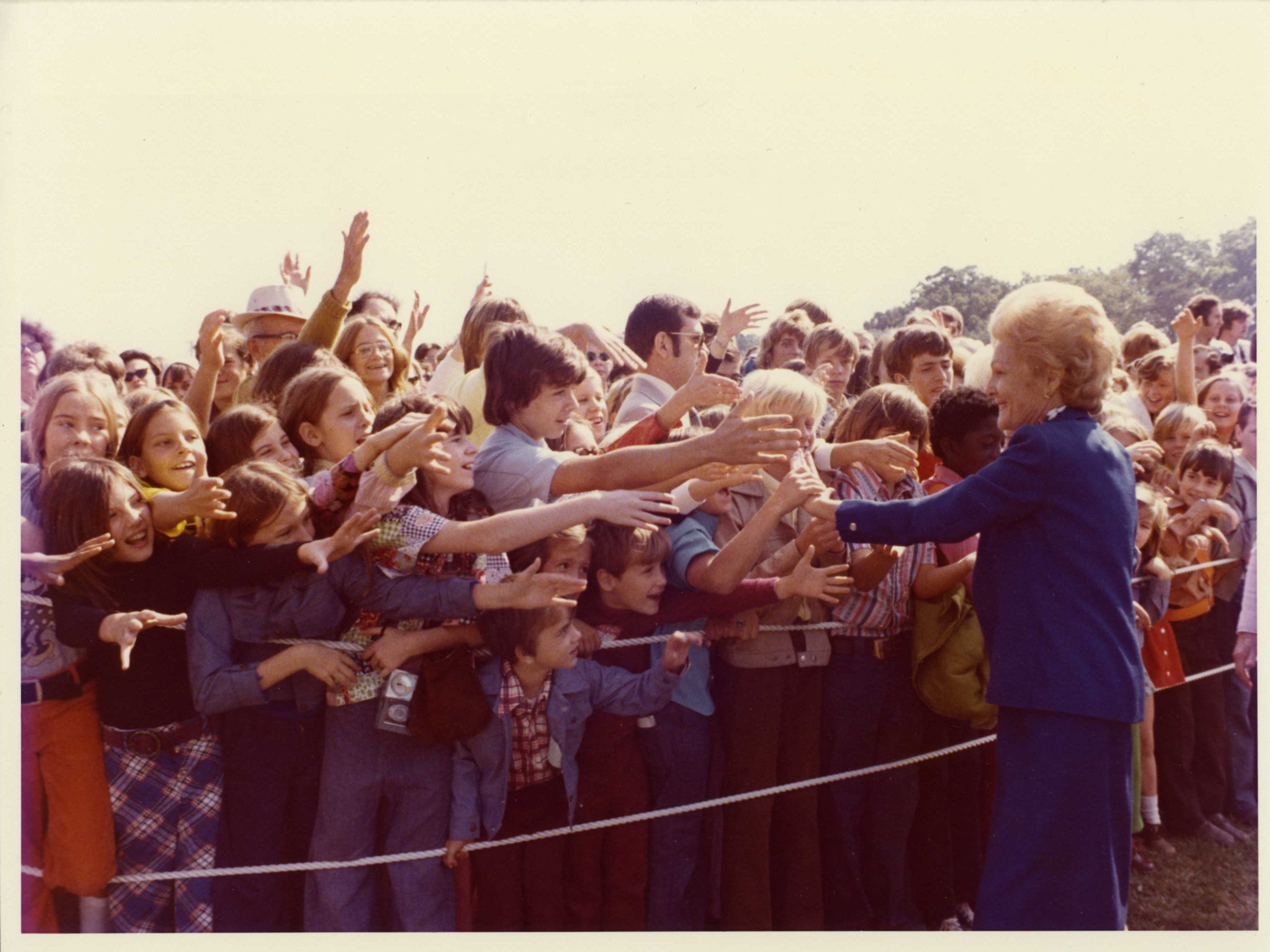
First Lady Pat Nixon working a rope line, 1974

A rope line is a setting in which a major celebrity, i.e. movie star, musician, supermodel, politician, internet celebrity, interacts with the general public. A crowd control barrier – originally a rope but now typically a secure metal fence – separates the celebrity from the crowd. In American political terminology, a politician "walking down the rope line" or "working the rope line" is engaging with their supporters – hand shaking, chatting, signing autographs and providing photo opportunities.

== Popular use ==
- In 2004, U.S. President George W. Bush explained that he had only met Ahmed Chalabi in informal settings, such as when he was "just kind of working through the rope line" at the 2004 State of the Union address.
