= Tim McCarthy =

US Secret Service agent (born 1949)

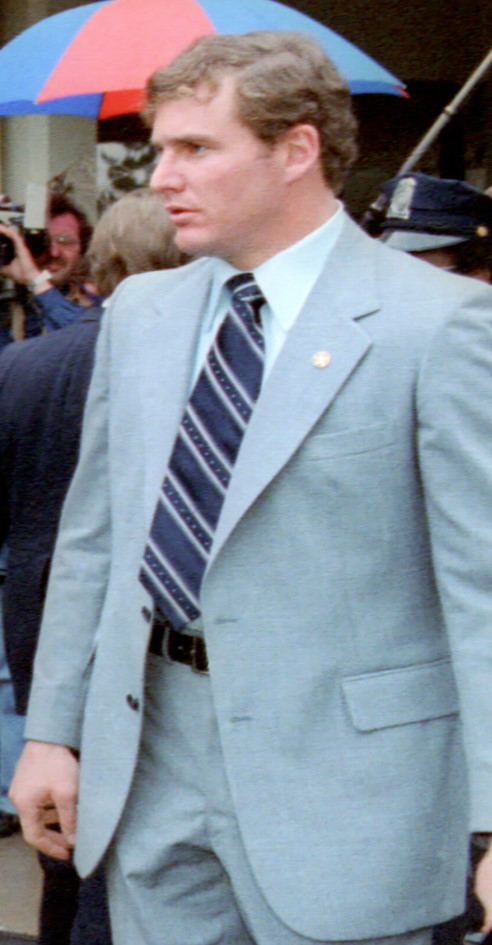
- McCarthy in 1981, moments before the shooting
- Born: Timothy J. McCarthy; June 20, 1949 (age 77); Chicago, Illinois, U.S.
- Education: University of Illinois (BS); Lewis University (MS)
- Occupations: Secret Service special agent Chief of police
- Known for: Saving President Reagan during his assassination attempt
- Children: 3

Timothy J. McCarthy (born June 20, 1949) is an American retired police officer and special agent of the U.S. Secret Service. He is best known for defending then-president Ronald Reagan during the assassination attempt on Reagan's life on March 30, 1981, in Washington, D.C.

During the assassination attempt, McCarthy spread his stance to protect Reagan as six bullets were being fired by the would-be assassin, John Hinckley Jr. McCarthy stepped in front of President Reagan, taking a bullet to the chest, but made a full recovery.

After the assassination attempt, McCarthy was hailed as a hero and received the NCAA Award of Valor in 1982.

== Early life ==
McCarthy was born on June 20, 1949, and was raised in Chicago's Ashburn neighborhood. He graduated from St. Denis Grammar School and Leo Catholic High School. He then attended the University of Illinois at Urbana-Champaign.

He joined the Fighting Illini football team as a walk on in his freshman year. He earned a football scholarship for his sophomore year and played as strong safety his junior year before an injury ended his college career.

While there, he was a member of Delta Tau Delta. He served 22 years in the United States Secret Service.

== Law enforcement career ==
His career included eight years assigned to the Presidential Protective Division in Washington, D.C., and 14 years as a criminal investigator in Chicago. McCarthy was the special agent in charge of the Secret Service Chicago Division from 1989 until his retirement in October 1993.

== Reagan assassination attempt ==
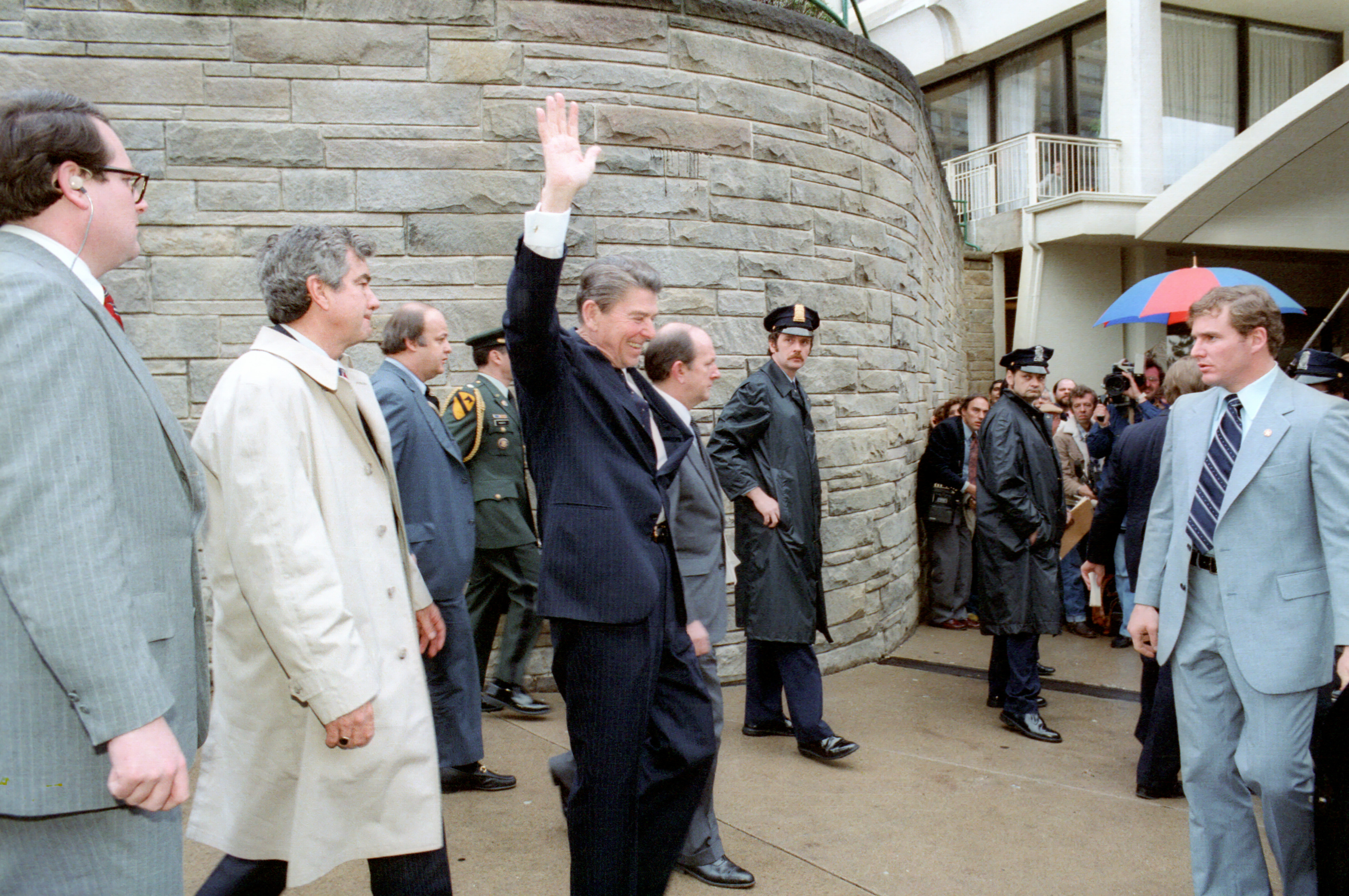
McCarthy (far right) moments before the attempted assassination of Reagan (waving). Left, in white trenchcoat, Jerry Parr, who pushed the President, body-sheltered by McCarthy, into the car.

On March 30, 1981, John Hinckley Jr. opened fire on President Ronald Reagan as he exited the Washington Hilton Hotel after giving a speech, firing six bullets in 1.7 seconds. As Special Agent In Charge Jerry Parr quickly pushed Reagan into the limousine, McCarthy put himself in the line of fire and spread his body in front of Reagan to make himself a target.

He was struck in the chest by the fourth bullet, the bullet traversing McCarthy's right lung, diaphragm, and right lobe of the liver. McCarthy was not wearing a bulletproof vest.

McCarthy was not supposed to be on duty that day. At the last minute, the Secret Service received a request for an officer to provide protection to Reagan for an AFL-CIO luncheon on March 31. McCarthy and a colleague flipped a coin to see who would have to fill in on their day off; McCarthy lost.

McCarthy was taken to George Washington University Hospital, and was operated on near the president. He was later released after a two-hour surgery.

== Post-Secret Service career ==
McCarthy became the Chief of the Orland Park Police Department in May 1994.

In 1998, he ran for the Democratic nomination for Illinois Secretary of State against Jesse White of Chicago, then the Recorder of Deeds for Cook County, and State Senator Penny Severns of Decatur. Severns was removed from the ballot after failing to meet the signature requirement. McCarthy ran an outsider campaign that took a law-enforcement approach to the Secretary of State's office including standardized DUI tests and easier to read license plates. White won the primary election with 55% of the vote to McCarthy's 45% of the vote, or a margin of 100,195 votes.

He earned a Bachelor of Science in Finance from the University of Illinois at Urbana-Champaign, and a Master of Science in Criminal/Social Justice from Lewis University.

In March 2016, he was awarded the first annual Chief of Police of the Year award by the Illinois Association of Chiefs of Police. The award cited his legislative advocacy, supervision of the building of the country's first police station to receive a LEED Gold certification, working to establish the South Suburban Major Crimes Task Force, promoting crisis intervention training for officers and the use of Narcan to prevent heroin overdoses.

From July 2016 to April 2017 he served as the acting village manager of Orland Park. He later served as the corporate vice president of a security systems company, and appeared in speaking engagements at schools and conventions, where he related his experiences as a Secret Service Agent during the Reagan administration.

On July 1, 2020, McCarthy announced his retirement, effective August 1, 2020.

== Personal life ==
McCarthy and his wife were married for 47 years at the time of his retirement in July 2020. They have three children.

McCarthy was interviewed in 2016 about the release of John Hinckley Jr., stating, "I don't have to agree with it, but I expected it. There are very few cases that people, after a period of time, are viewed as no longer being a danger to themselves or others. I hope they're right about it. It's a big decision. I give the judge credit. That's what he gets paid for."
