= Martin Anderson (economist) =

American academic, economist, and policy analyst

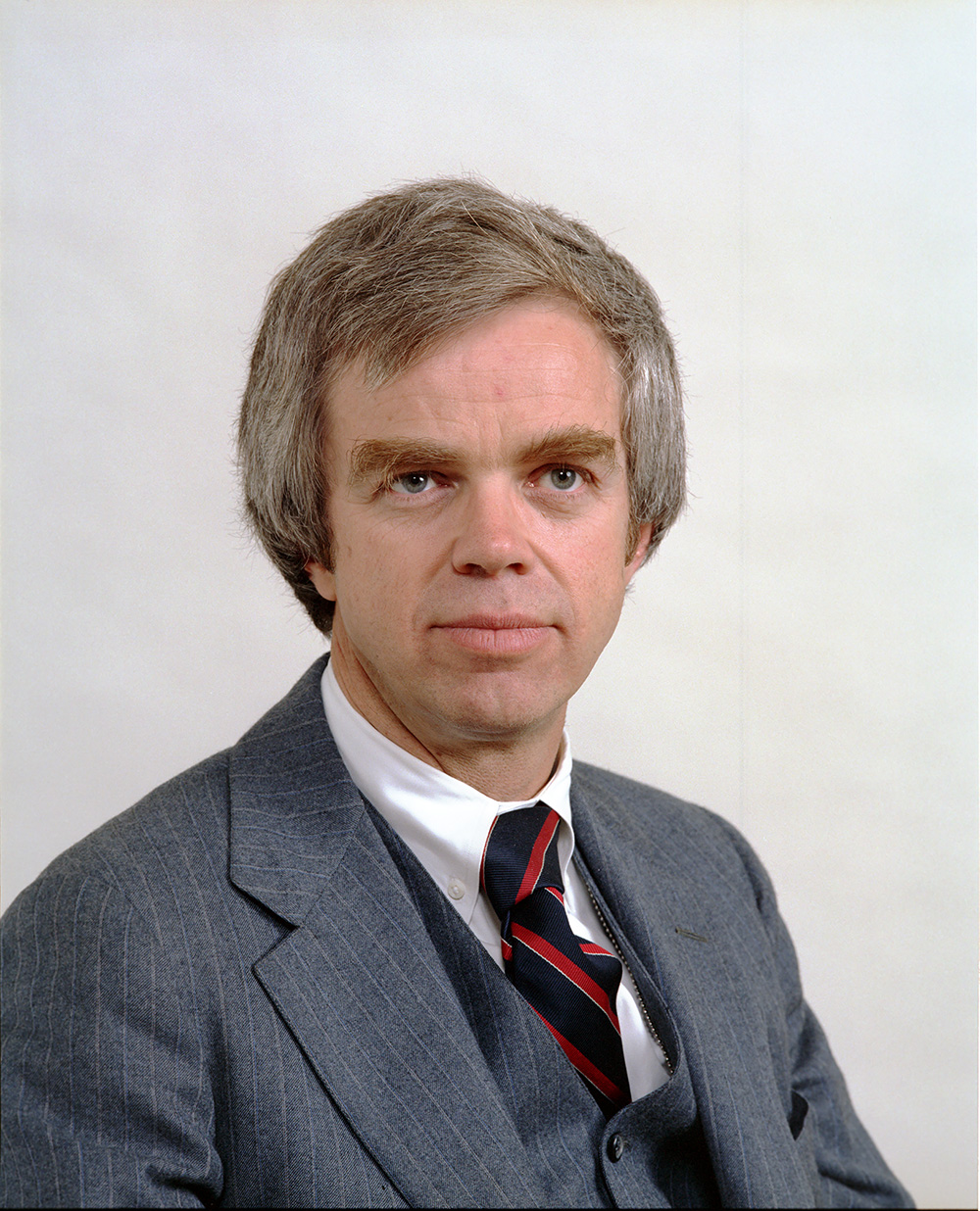
- Anderson in November 1982
- Born: August 5, 1936; Lowell, Massachusetts, U.S.
- Died: January 3, 2015 (aged 78); Portola Valley, California, U.S.
- Occupations: Economist, advisor
- Years active: 1961–2015

Martin Anderson (August 5, 1936 – January 3, 2015) was an American academic, economist, author, policy analyst, and adviser to U.S. politicians and presidents, including Ronald Reagan and Richard Nixon. In the Nixon administration, Anderson was credited with helping to end the military draft and creating the all-volunteer armed forces. Under Reagan, Anderson helped draft the administration's original economic program that became known as “Reaganomics.” A political conservative and a strong proponent of free-market capitalism, he was influenced by libertarianism and opposed government regulations that limited individual freedom.

Anderson wrote and edited numerous books on topics concerning urban renewal, military manpower, welfare reform, higher education, and his experiences advising Reagan and Nixon. Later he coedited four books on Reagan's writings and coauthored two books on Reagan's efforts to negotiate nuclear disarmament with the Soviet Union.

== Early life and education ==
Martin Anderson was born in Lowell, Massachusetts, on August 5, 1936, the only child of Ralph and Evelyn Anderson, a dairy farmer and a nurse, respectively. In school he was a top student and student body president. In 1953, he was awarded a four-year scholarship to Dartmouth College to study engineering. He graduated in 1957 summa cum laude and remained at Dartmouth to pursue a double master's degree in business and engineering through the Thayer School of Engineering and the Tuck School of Business.

In 1958, Anderson met his future wife, Annelise Graebner; the two married in 1965. They shared an interest in conservative politics and had campaigned together for Barry Goldwater in the 1964 presidential election. They later attended courses together at the Nathaniel Branden Institute and became friends with novelist and philosopher Ayn Rand, and through Rand met economist Alan Greenspan, who through Rand and Alan Greenspan's recommendation had begun his career in government.

== Career ==
=== Academia ===
In 1959, Anderson was named assistant to the dean of the Thayer School of Engineering, and he became acting dean that summer. In the fall of 1959, the Ford Foundation awarded him a fellowship to study economics and finance at the Joint Center for Urban Studies at the Massachusetts Institute of Technology. At MIT, he became interested in urban renewal, which became the topic of his doctorate. He spent one summer working for the Ford Motor Company as a financial analyst. In 1962, he earned the first Ph.D. in industrial management ever granted by a college or university from the MIT Sloan School of Management. Upon graduating, he embarked upon a career in academia and writing.

On July 1, 1962, Anderson began working as an assistant professor of finance at Columbia Business School. The same year, his dissertation, The Federal Bulldozer: A Critical Analysis of Urban Renewal, 1949–1962, was published by MIT Press. The dissertation's central thesis is that urban renewal was a failure because it didn't eliminate slums or create affordable housing; rather, it replaced slums with more costly housing that forced the poor to move elsewhere. The book was controversially received, including criticism among his fellow professors at Columbia University. Additionally, the book was bashed by Mr. Wilson, the Director of the Joint Center, an organization which sponsored the work, because he claimed that Anderson's work met only the minimum standards of scholarship by which the center conducts its studies. As the book was published with the support of the Joint Center for Urban Studies of M.I.T and Harvard, it was thought it would be an objective study. Rather, some saw the volume as a strongly partisan account and an unbalanced tirade against the federal program as a whole. Amongst a topic with charged opinions, when someone suggests the modification or elimination of a government initiative, as Anderson did, it is often met with a strong responses, which quickly became the case. Anderson's strong claims supported by unqualified and fragile evidence generated a hostile reaction among academics to The Federal Bulldozer.

However, it established Anderson as an expert on urban renewal. It also brought Anderson to the attention of Richard Nixon. In 1965, he was promoted to associate professor; at age 28, he was one of the youngest teachers to receive tenure in Columbia's history. He was associate professor from 1965 to 1968. An updated paperback edition of The Federal Bulldozer was published by McGraw-Hill in 1967.

=== Advising Richard Nixon ===
Anderson served as an adviser to the 1968 Nixon presidential campaign, Nixon's White House transition, and the Nixon administration.

=== 1968 Nixon presidential campaign ===
In 1967, members of Nixon's staff, Len Garment, Pat Buchanan, and Ray Price, invited Anderson to join Nixon's presidential campaign planning group as a policy adviser. In this role, he wrote a policy paper on ending the draft and moving to an all-volunteer force, “An Analysis of the Factors Involved in Moving to an All-Volunteer Armed Force.” Nixon echoed the sentiments expressed in Anderson's paper in an interview with New York Times reporter Robert B. Semple Jr. in December 1967. Along with Walter Oi and Milton Friedman, Anderson is credited with helping to end military conscription in the United States.

In 1968, Anderson joined the Nixon presidential campaign, focusing on domestic and economic policy. As Nixon's chief urban affairs adviser, Anderson was tasked with developing policy to address the problems associated with America's low-income neighborhoods. He advocated for self-help with a call for increased African American ownership, a component of the movement now known as Black capitalism. A report written by Anderson on the subject of basic income, which quoted heavily from Karl Polanyi's The Great Transformation on the Speenhamland system, was credited by Rutger Bregman and Corey Robin with Nixon moving away from the idea of basic income, and by Bregman as, from there, ultimately providing arguments for various welfare reforms by Ronald Reagan, Bill Clinton and George W. Bush.

Anderson's wife, Annelise Graebner Anderson, also worked on the campaign, traveling with vice presidential candidate Spiro Agnew. During this time, Anderson was introduced to economists Milton Friedman and Arthur F. Burns, who were to become his lifelong mentors.

=== Nixon White House transition ===
Martin Anderson was appointed special assistant to the president and worked closely with Arthur F. Burns, who was appointed counsellor for domestic policy. Together they wrote a policy notebook that was used to write letters of instruction for incoming cabinet secretaries. In Anderson's 1990 book Revolution, he lamented that the Nixon transition was not able to find middle- and lower-level staff loyal to the new administration's policy goals.

=== Nixon administration ===
During the first year of the Nixon administration, Anderson focused on welfare policy. In February 1970, Burns left the White House to become Federal Reserve chair. Upon his departure, Anderson's title changed to special consultant to the president for systems analysis, a title never used before, reporting to John Ehrlichman. In September 1970, Bryce Harlow recruited Anderson, William Safire, and Pat Buchanan to travel with Vice President Agnew and support the reelection campaigns of GOP senators.

In 1968, Richard Nixon had campaigned with a promise to end the draft. Soon after taking office, he formed the President's Commission on an All-Volunteer Force, chaired by former defense secretary Thomas S. Gates Jr. On February 21, 1970, the Gates Commission presented its findings to President Nixon. Its report stated that members unanimously agreed that the country should replace conscription with an all-volunteer military force. In response, Nixon appointed a group of White House staff, headed by Anderson, to review the commission's findings and report on the cost and feasibility of an all-volunteer force. In March 1971, Anderson left the White House to return to academia as a senior fellow at the Hoover Institution at Stanford University. The national draft officially ended on January 27, 1973.

== Advising Ronald Reagan ==
Anderson was the only full-time economic policy adviser on both the 1976 and 1980 Reagan presidential campaigns. After Reagan's successful later bid, Anderson served as an adviser during the White House transition, and during the Reagan administration he served as assistant to the president for policy development and worked on the Military Manpower Task Force. After leaving the White House and returning to academia in March 1982, he continued to advise the Reagan administration, serving on the President's Foreign Intelligence Advisory Board, the President's Economic Policy Advisory Board, and the President's General Advisory Committee on Arms Control and Disarmament.

=== 1976 Reagan presidential campaign ===
In 1975, John Sears and Lyn Nofziger invited Anderson to join the Reagan presidential campaign as an adviser on foreign, defense, and economic policy. Anderson accompanied Reagan throughout the campaign and was present at many key junctures, including Reagan's defeat in the North Carolina primary and his speech at the 1976 Republican National Convention. It was at this time that Anderson became acquainted with Michael Deaver and Edwin Meese III.

Anderson organized meetings between Reagan and the nation's top economists. The meetings led to the formation of six economic policy task forces comprising 74 economists. Between the 1976 and 1980 campaigns, Anderson continued to seek out policy experts and introduce them to Reagan. By the 1980 campaign, there were 329 advisers organized into 23 task forces.

During this time, Anderson was a member of the Committee on the Present Danger, which played an important role in developing defense policy. He continued on the committee until 1991.

=== 1980 Reagan presidential campaign ===
In March 1979, Anderson took an indefinite leave of absence from the Hoover Institution and moved to Los Angeles to join the Reagan campaign. Among his responsibilities were the development and coordination of policy positions. In August 1979, Anderson drafted three influential memoranda on economic policy, energy policy, and foreign and defense policies.

Anderson's Policy Memo No. 1 on economics made the case that inflation was the nation's most pressing domestic concern due to its social and political cost. It further argued that the primary cause for inflation was the deficit and that the best way to eliminate the deficit was to "reduce the rate of growth of federal expenditures and to simultaneously stimulate the economy so as to increase revenues in such a way that the private share grows proportionately more than the government share.”

Anderson's Policy Memo No. 3 on foreign policy, proposed a new, updated missile defense system that foreshadowed Reagan's Strategic Defense Initiative.

=== Reagan White House transition ===
After Reagan's 1980 election to president, Anderson, reporting to Edwin Meese, participated in a broad range of decision-making activities. He studied the transitions of the Ford and Carter administrations and developed a methodical briefing procedure for new cabinet officers that ensured they would “not betray the policies the campaign was fought on.” He also produced and gave to each cabinet secretary a notebook with policy positions relevant to their area.

=== Reagan administration ===
In the White House, continuing to report to Edwin Meese, Anderson was appointed assistant to the president for policy development and given responsibility for domestic and economic policy. Anderson became known as the “conscience of the administration,” due to his insistence that policy decisions reflect campaign promises and Reagan's personal views. Anderson said his goals were “to keep the policy effort focused on those things that Reagan wanted done, and in the order he wanted to do them.”

Inspired by the economic policy advisory board developed by Richard V. Allen during the Reagan transition, Anderson developed the President's Economic Policy Advisory Board and invited economists who had worked on the Reagan campaign but did not join the administration, along with other outside experts, to serve on it. It was signed into existence on March 2, 1981, with Executive Order 12296. Reporting directly to the president, it was chaired by George P. Shultz and included distinguished economists Arthur Burns, Alan Greenspan, Milton Friedman, Paul McCracken, and William Simon Sr. Some White House economists, including Martin Feldstein and Murray Weidenbaum, asserted that the board had little influence. However, Anderson said the board played an important role in pushing the administration to enact tax cuts and go forward with deregulation. Anderson joined the board after leaving the White House in 1982 and remained a member until 1989.

In response to questions regarding the armed forces' ability to attract and retain enough adequately educated volunteers to operate the military's increasingly sophisticated weapons systems, President Reagan announced the formation of the Military Manpower Task Force on July 8, 1981, and appointed Anderson a member. The goal of the task force was to review “compensation, educational benefits, readiness, training and discipline, standards of enlistment, recruiting and retention, and draft registration.” It was in place for 14 months, and despite serious divisions between the civilian and military members of the task force, it concluded that the all-volunteer armed force was working.

In March 1982, desiring a return to the world of academia and writing as administration policy development slowed down, Anderson left the White House.

After leaving the White House, Anderson was appointed to the President's Foreign Intelligence Advisory Board. Deactivated during the Carter administration, the board was reestablished in 1981, at Richard V. Allen's request, with Executive Order No. 12331, which granted it the authority to “continually review the performance of all agencies of Government that are engaged in the collection, evaluation, or production of intelligence or the execution of intelligence policy [and] to assess the adequacy of management, personnel, and organization in the intelligence agencies.” Anderson's participation was terminated on October 31, 1985, when the board was restructured. He and other board members terminated at the same time believed that the board's restructuring might have played a role in the Iran-Contra affair.

In 1986, Anderson was nominated by Reagan to the President's General Advisory Committee on Arms Control and Disarmament. He served on the committee from 1987 to 1993 but noted that by the fall of 1987, it had fallen into disuse and had eight vacancies.

== Hoover Institution ==
In 1971, after leaving the Nixon administration, Anderson joined the Hoover Institution at Stanford University as a senior fellow, conducting research on economic and political issues. In 1976, he published Conscription: A Select and Annotated Bibliography with the Hoover Institution Press. In 1975, he became an adjunct scholar at the American Enterprise Institute. Anderson left the Hoover Institution and the American Enterprise Institute in 1975 to join the Reagan presidential campaign.

Upon returning to the Hoover Institution in 1976, Anderson helped compile a book of short essays and policy recommendations, The United States in the 1980s, published in 1980. The book was referred to by Mikhail Gorbachev in 1985 as "the real blueprint" of the Reagan administration. Anderson also published Welfare: The Political Economy of Welfare Reform in the United States (Hoover Institution Press, 1978), which drew from his experience working on President Nixon's Family Assistance Plan of 1969 and President Gerald Ford's Income Supplementation Plan of 1974. In 1979, Anderson left the Hoover Institution to join the Reagan presidential campaign and serve in the Reagan administration.

When Anderson returned to the Hoover Institution in 1982, he retained influence in the Reagan administration through membership on various boards and committees and through his writings. In 1982, he published The Military Draft: Selected Readings on Conscription (Hoover Institution Press) and edited Registration and the Draft: Proceedings of the Hoover-Rochester Conference on the All-Volunteer Force (Hoover Institution Press). In 1984, he published An Economic Bill of Rights (Hoover Institution Press). Reagan promoted an economic bill of rights tenet in 1987.

In 1985, Anderson published Stanford and Hoover and Academic Freedom: A Collection of Published Reports on the Relationship between Stanford University and the Hoover Institution (Hoover Institution Press). In 1987, he published An Insurance Missile Defense (Hoover Institution Press). In 1988 he described his experience working in the Reagan White House in Revolution (Harcourt, Brace, Jovanovich, 1988). In 1992, he turned his focus to administrative problems and malfeasance in higher education, publishing Impostors in the Temple] (Simon & Schuster, 1992).

In 1996, Anderson returned to working on political campaigns, often in concert with other Hoover fellows. In his later years, Anderson focused on writing and editing books about Ronald Reagan. With coeditors Annelise Graebner Anderson and Kiron Skinner, he used the extensive writings of Ronald Reagan held in archives to publish a series of books detailing Reagan's ideas and their evolution: Stories in His Own Hand : The Everyday Wisdom of Ronald Reagan (Free Press, 2001), Reagan, in His Own Hand (Simon & Schuster, 2002), Reagan: A Life in Letters (Free Press, 2003), and Reagan's Path to Victory: The Shaping of Ronald Reagan's Vision, Selected Writings (Free Press, 2004). As more declassified documents became available, Anderson and his wife and coauthor, Annelise Graebner Anderson, published two more books, detailing Reagan's negotiations with the Soviet Union to eliminate the proliferation of nuclear weapons and prevent a nuclear war: Reagan's Secret War: The Untold Story of His Fight to Save the World from Nuclear Disaster (Crown Archetype, 2009) and Ronald Reagan: Decisions of Greatness (Hoover Institution Press, 2015).

In 1998, Anderson was named the Hoover Institution's Keith and Jan Hurlbut Fellow.

== Death ==
Anderson died January 3, 2015, in Portola Valley, California, at age 78.

== Republican National Conventions ==
Between 1968 and 2004 Martin Anderson attended every Republican National Convention, playing an important role in several. In 1972 he was head writer for the Republican Party platform. In 1976 he was Reagan's chief issues adviser, charged with watching over the platform committee. In 1980 he advised Reagan and acted as platform committee overseer, in which role he helped draft compromise language for the Equal Rights Amendment plank of the party platform. In 1984 and 1988 he worked as a consultant for the Republican Platform Committee. He was a delegate in 1992, 1996, 2000, and 2004. In 2000, he was chairman of the GOP's Technology and Economic Prosperity Subcommittee, which worked on the internet provisions of the party platform.

== Other political campaigns and commentary ==
- In 1992, Anderson joined Tom Campbell's campaign for the California State Senate. Campbell sought Anderson's help in developing a plan to cut the deficit and taxes. John Cogan and John Taylor, fellows at the Hoover Institution, also worked on the campaign.
- Between 1993 and 1994, Anderson was a syndicated columnist for the Scripps Howard News Service.
- In 1995 Anderson joined Pete Wilson's presidential campaign as a senior advisor. When Wilson left the race, Wilson endorsed Bob Dole and placed Anderson on the California Delegate Committee to the Republican National Convention.
- In 1996 Anderson joined the Dole campaign as an economic policy advisor and senior advisor, traveling extensively with the candidate.
- Between 1996 and 1998, Anderson was a regular commentator on the PBS Nightly Business Report.
- In 1998, Anderson joined the George W. Bush presidential campaign as a policy adviser.
- Between 2001 and 2002, Anderson was a top adviser on Bill Simon's campaign for California governor. Simon's chief Republican rival was Richard Riordan, who was advised by Hoover Institution fellows George P. Shultz and Michael Boskin.

== Other Task Forces, Commissions, Councils, and Boards ==
- 1972–1975, Public Interest Director, Federal Home Loan Bank of San Francisco
- 1973–1976, Member, Rockefeller Commission on Critical Choices for Americans
- In November 1974, Anderson chaired an ad hoc White House task force on welfare reform, with the objective of reviewing President Ford's Income Supplementation Plan, which was developed by Caspar Weinberger.
- 1974–1976, member of the Council on Trends and Perspectives, an advisory group for the US Chamber of Commerce on economic policy and other issues
- 1985–1992, trustee and secretary of the Ronald Reagan Presidential Foundation, tasked with choosing a site and architect for the construction of the Ronald Reagan Presidential Library and Museum.
- In February 1993, appointed to the California Governor's Council of Economic Advisers, created by Pete Wilson. The council helped move welfare reforms and crime bills through the legislature. Milton Friedman and George P. Shultz also served on the council.
- In July 1997, appointed to the National Commission on the Cost of Higher Education, a federal commission that studied the rising cost of college education, established at the request of Buck McKeon. Anderson was appointed to the commission by Newt Gingrich.
- In 1998, the Congressional Policy Advisory Board was formed by Chris Cox at Martin Anderson's request with Anderson as chairman. The goal of the board was to put members of Congress in touch with nongovernment policy experts. Its members included Paul Wolfowitz, Donald Rumsfeld, George P. Shultz, and Richard V. Allen. The board dissolved itself in 2001 after George W. Bush was elected to the US presidency and most of its members joined the new administration.
- In 2001, appointed to the Defense Policy Board Advisory Committee, which advised Defense Secretary Donald H. Rumsfeld, Deputy Secretary of Defense Paul Wolfowitz, and the Department of Defense.
- In September 2004, named member of Governor Arnold Schwarzenegger's Council of Economic Advisers
- 2005–2006, member of the Defense Advisory Committee on Military Compensation

== Selected writings ==
Anderson authored:

- The Federal Bulldozer: A Critical Analysis of Urban Renewal: 1949–62 (McGraw-Hill, 1967)
- Conscription: A Select and Annotated Bibliography (Hoover Institution Press, 1976)
- Welfare: The Political Economy of Welfare Reform in the United States (Hoover Institution Press, 1978)
- The Military Draft: Selected Readings on Conscription (Hoover Institution Press, 1982)
- An Economic Bill of Rights (Hoover Institution Press, 1984)
- Revolution: The Reagan Legacy (Harcourt Brace Jovanovich, 1988; Hoover Institution Press, 1990)
- Impostors in the Temple (Simon & Schuster, 1992)

Anderson coauthored with Annelise Graebner Anderson:

- Reagan's Secret War: The Untold Story of His Fight to Save the World from Nuclear Disaster (Crown Archetype, 2009)
- Ronald Reagan: Decisions of Greatness (Hoover Institution Press, 2015)

Anderson edited:

- Registration and the Draft (Hoover Institution Press, 1982)

Anderson coedited with Annelise Graebner Anderson and Kiron Skinner:

- Reagan, in His Own Hand: The Writings of Ronald Reagan That Reveal His Revolutionary Vision for America (Free Press, 2001)
- Stories in His Own Hand: The Everyday Wisdom of Ronald Reagan (Free Press, 2001)
- Reagan: A Life in Letters (Free Press, 2003)
- Reagan's Path to Victory: The Shaping of Ronald Reagan's Vision: Selected Writings (Free Press, 2004)
