= Gale Pooley =

American economist and author

Gale L. Pooley
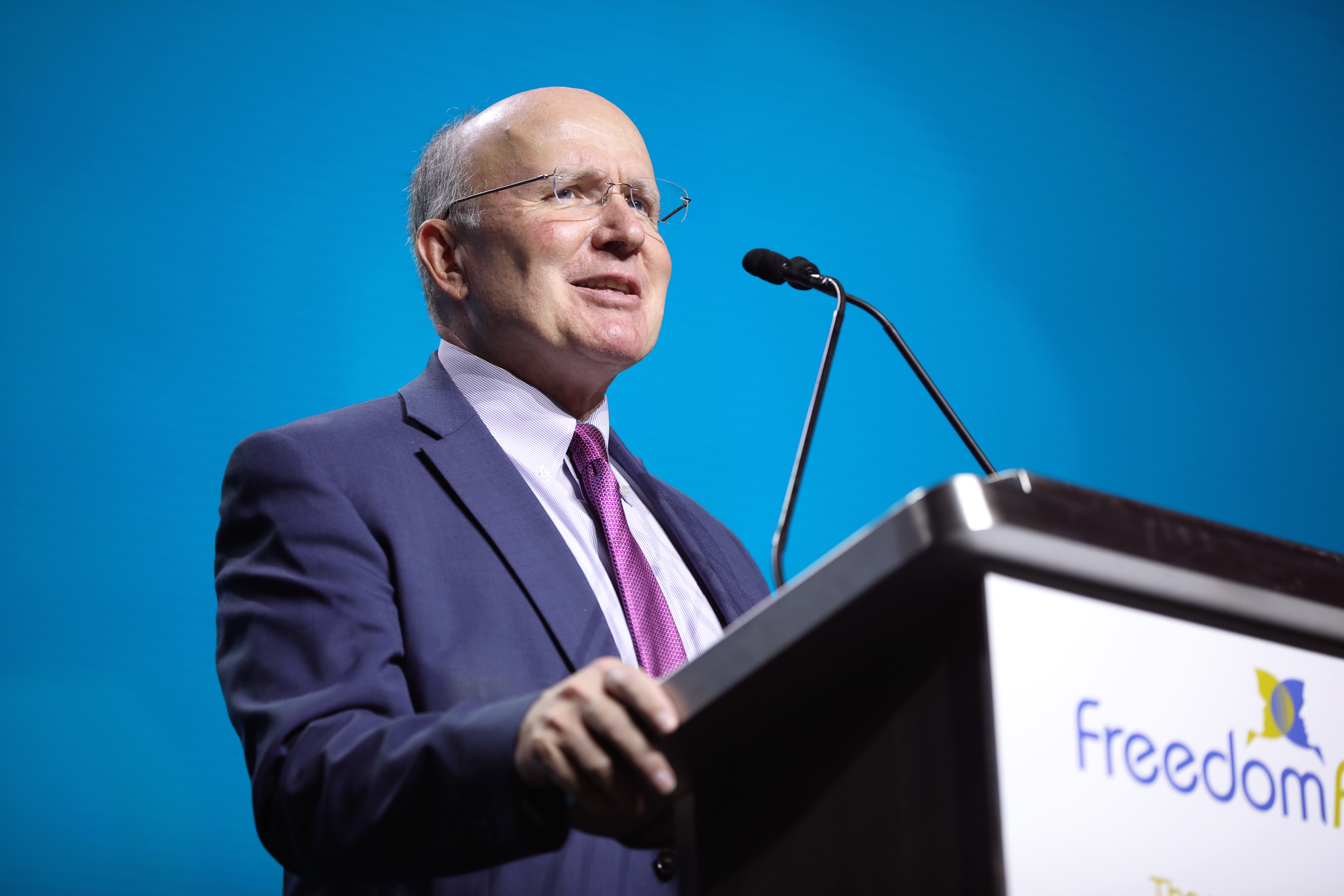
- Born: Idaho
- Education: BBA in Economics, Boise State University; Graduate work, Montana State University; PhD, University of Idaho
- Occupations: Economist, professor, author
- Known for: Superabundance, Simon Abundance Index
- Notable work: Superabundance Pooley-Tupy theorem
- Website: www.superabundance.com

Gale L. Pooley is an American economist, professor, and author, known for his work in economics and real estate valuation.

He is currently an adjunct professor of economic history at Utah Tech University. He previously held a position as associate professor at Brigham Young University–Hawaii (BYU-Hawaii), where he taught in the Department of Business and Government as the lead for the economics program.

His academic career also includes teaching positions at Alfaisal University in Riyadh, Brigham Young University–Idaho, Boise State University, and the College of Idaho, in the fields of business, statistics, and economics. Pooley holds professional designations from the Appraisal Institute, the Royal Institution of Chartered Surveyors, and the CCIM Institute.

== Biography ==
Pooley earned a BBA in Economics from Boise State University, pursued graduate work at Montana State University, and completed his PhD. at the University of Idaho. In 1986, he founded Analytix Group, a real estate valuation and consulting firm, which has conducted over 5,000 appraisals in the U.S. and Saudi Arabia. He has also developed commercial and residential properties and served as a certified developer for Apple Inc. Pooley is the founding board member of North Star Charter School in Eagle, Idaho, which he created for his seven children. Pooley served in the United States Marine Corps.

=== Academic career ===
Before his tenure at Utah Tech University, Pooley taught at BYU-Hawaii, where he was actively involved in research that would later culminate in his influential book Superabundance, refining his ideas through his lectures. At BYU-Hawaii, he was known for his engagement with students, serving as the faculty supervisor for the Economics Club. Pooley is a Senior fellow with the Discovery Institute, an Adjunct Scholar at the Cato Institute, a Grassroot Scholar at the Grassroot Institute of Hawaii, serves on the Foundation for Economic Education Faculty Network, and as a board member of HumanProgress.org.

His major research includes the Simon Abundance Index, co-authored with Marian Tupy, which uses the "time prices" of 50 basic commodities to estimate the relationship between global population growth and resource abundance. This work argues against the conventional view that increasing population leads to resource scarcity.

Pooley's work is built upon the Pooley-Tupy theorem which measures the growth in knowledge resources over time with time prices.

In addition to writing his own Substack articles entitled Gale Winds, Pooley has written for and been published by Forbes, National Review, HumanProgress, The American Spectator, Foundation for Economic Education, The Utah Bar journal, The Appraisal Journal, Quillette, and Real Clear Markets. He has presented at FreedomFest, on C-SPAN, and the COSM Technology conference. Pooley is also a member of the Mont Pelerin Society.

==== Awards and honors ====
The book Superabundance has received wide acclaim, at the time of release it was the No. 1 New Best Seller on Amazon. The book has gained significant attention, including being cited on the floor of the U.S. Senate by Senator Rand Paul. Pooley was interviewed on C-SPAN about the book Superabundance. Pooley and co-author Marion Tupy were interviewed by Jordan Peterson after the books release. The book has been reviewed by The Wall Street Journal, Forbes, The Economist, and many other online and printed publications, as well as podcasters and content creators. Its arguments have sparked discussions on the positive impacts of population growth and the role of human creativity in overcoming challenges related to resource scarcity. Journalist John Stossel did a video segment featuring co-author Marian Tupy about the book Superabundance.

The book has received positive independent reviews from Nobel laureates Paul Romer and Angus Deaton, as well as from author Steven Pinker, Washington Post columnist George Will, Harvard professor Jason Furman, author economist William Easterly, Balaji Srinivasan, Andrew McAfee, and many others.

The book received the Julian L. Simon Memorial Award from the Competitive Enterprise Institute in 2023. The book also received the Leonard E. Read Book Award from Freedom Fest in 2024. The book was a two-time finalist for the F. A. Hayek Award from the Manhattan Institute.

== Personal life ==
Pooley and his wife DeAnna are parents to seven children. Their family life is an integral part of his personal and professional identity. Pooley has said that being LDS has been instrumental in developing his world view. Influences and favorite authors include Jordan Peterson, Thomas Sowell, Deirdre McCloskey, George Gilder, Friedrich Hayek and Julian Simon.
