= Peter D. Hannaford =

American business and political consultant (1932–2015)

- Born: Peter Dor Hannaford; September 21, 1932; Glendale, California, U.S.
- Died: September 5, 2015 (aged 82); Eureka, California, U.S.
- Education: University of California, Berkeley (BA)
- Occupations: Public relations consultant, author
- Political party: Republican
- Spouse: Irene Harville Hannaford

Peter Dor Hannaford (September 21, 1932 – September 5, 2015) was an American business consultant and author who was a political consultant to California Governor and U.S. President Ronald Reagan.

== Early life ==
A native of Glendale, California, Hannaford graduated in 1954 with a degree in English from the University of California, Berkeley. From 1954 to 1956, he was a first lieutenant in the United States Army Signal Corps. After his military tour of duty, he joined the company of Helen Kennedy, already an established figure in the public relations business in San Francisco and Oakland. In subsequently years he was affiliated with several other public relations firms. From 1969 to 1972, he was vice president of Wilton, Coombs & Colnett, Inc.

== Political career ==
Hannaford cast his first presidential vote in 1956 for Democrat Adlai Stevenson II, of Illinois, whose rhetoric and English diction greatly impressed him. Two years later, Hannaford re-registered as a Republican, but 1958 was one of the worst years in history for the GOP in California and nationally as well. The party lost one of its two U.S. Senate seats and the governorship, when Governor Goodwin J. Knight and Senator William F. Knowland tried to switch offices. In 1960, Hannaford volunteered to work on the Republican phone bank to get out the vote for presidential nominee Richard Nixon, whom he had voted against as vice president four years earlier. In 1964, Hannaford supported Barry Goldwater over the Governor Nelson Rockefeller in the showdown California presidential primary. In the 1966 Republican gubernatorial primary, Hannaford supported not Goldwater's heir apparent, Reagan, but moderate Republican former San Francisco Mayor George Christopher, the last Republican thus far to have held that particular office since January 1964. Hannaford quickly switched to Reagan in the general election against Governor Edmund G. Brown, Sr., and thereafter stood with the conservative faction of the party.

In 1972, midway in Reagan's second term as governor, Hannaford was a candidate for California's 7th congressional district seat. In the primary election, he won the Republican nomination with 39 percent of the vote against four opponents, the strongest of whom was Craig Bull. Hannaford was then defeated 60 to 38 percent in the general election by the Democrat Ron Dellums, a liberal African American, who won his second term and was subsequently the mayor of Oakland. In defeat, Hannaford still ran ten thousand votes in his district ahead of Republican presidential nominee Richard Nixon, who otherwise carried forty-nine states that year against Democrat George McGovern.

During the Reagan gubernatorial administration, Hannaford was an administrative aide and director of public affairs, in which capacity he supervised the gubernatorial press office. From 1972 to 1973, he was the chairman of the California Governor's Consumer Fraud Task Force. Hannaford assisted Reagan in the unsuccessful 1976 presidential campaign as the director of issues and research. In Reagan's successful 1980 campaign, Hannaford was the senior communications adviser.

From 1981 to 1992, Hannaford was a member of the public relations advisory committee of the United States Information Agency. From 1981 to 1989, he was a trustee of the White House Preservation Fund. He served on the advisory committee of Mount Vernon, the Virginia estate of George Washington, from 1986 to 1991.

For a time, he was in business with another Reagan aide, Michael Deaver, in the public relations firm Deaver and Hannaford. He moved the business from California to Washington, D.C., in 1984.

Hannaford served as a member of the Committee on the Present Danger, a foreign policy interest group. In 2004, Hannaford saw a "parallel" between the national security threat posed by the former Soviet Union and the danger from terrorism.

He also served as a director of Citizens for the Republic, a political action committee founded by Reagan in 1977, operated by Lyn Nofziger, disbanded after the 1980 campaign, and revived in 2009 in Alexandria, Virginia, by Craig Shirley, the author of two books on Reagan's presidential campaigns.

== Publications ==
Hannaford's books, which focus on U.S. presidents and the media, include:

- The Essential George Washington: Two Hundred Years of Observations on the Man, the Myth, the Patriot (1999)
- My Heart Goes Home: A Hudson Valley Memoir by Thomas Sweet Lossing, editor (1997)
- The Quotable Calvin Coolidge: Sensible Words for a New Century (2001)
- The Quotable Ronald Reagan (1998)
- The Reagans: A Political Portrait (1983)
- Recollections of Reagan: A Portrait of Ronald Reagan (1997)
- Remembering Reagan (1994)
- Ronald Reagan and His Ranch: The Western White House, 1981-1989 (2002)
- Talking Back to the Media (1986)
- Presidential Retreats: Where the Presidents Went and Why They Went There (2012)

Hannaford contributed many articles over the years to conservative publications such as Human Events and The American Spectator.

== Later life ==
Hannaford resided in Eureka in northwestern California, where for a time he was the editor of the editorial pages of the Eureka Reporter, a daily newspaper which ceased publication on November 8, 2008.

Starting in 2001, Hannaford was president of his own company, Hannaford Enterprises, Inc., formerly Deaver and Hannaford, whose clients have included the New York Stock Exchange, Citibank, 3M, and General Motors. He was senior counsel to APCO Worldwide, a public affairs and strategic communications firm based in Washington, D.C. In 2014, he was honored as the Humboldt County Republican of the Year.

Hannaford died unexpectedly on September 5, 2015, at his home in Eureka, at age 82.
