= John Sears (political strategist) =

American attorney and political strategist (1940–2020)

Personal details
- Born: July 3, 1940; Syracuse, New York, U.S.
- Died: March 26, 2020 (aged 79); Miami, Florida, U.S.
- Political party: Republican
- Education: University of Notre Dame (BS); Georgetown University (LLB)

John Patrick Sears (July 3, 1940 – March 26, 2020) was an American attorney, and a Republican political strategist. He served as Deputy Counsel to President Richard M. Nixon from 1969–70, and assisted both Nixon and Ronald Reagan in their presidential campaigns.

== Early life and education ==
Sears was born in July 1940 near Syracuse, New York, the son of James L. Sears and Helen M. Fitzgerald. Sears attended Christian Brothers Academy in suburban Syracuse, a private Catholic preparatory academy. He earned his undergraduate degree at the University of Notre Dame (B.S.,1960), and completed law school at Georgetown University (L.L.B., J.D., 1963).

== Early career ==
=== Public sector ===
Sears worked as a law clerk for the New York State Court of Appeals from 1963-65.

=== Private sector ===
He then became a member of the New York City law firm of Nixon, Mudge, Rose, Alexander, Guthrie & Mitchell for two years. He met Richard M. Nixon as a colleague at this firm; at the time Nixon was a former congressman, senator, and vice-president, and unsuccessful presidential and gubernatorial candidate, working as a lawyer in private practice.

=== Political adviser, assists with 1968 nomination ===
He then joined Nixon's political staff, as Nixon was preparing a bid for the 1968 Republican presidential nomination. Sears played a pivotal role at the 1968 Republican National Convention, in securing Nixon's nomination for the presidency. He was only 28 at the time and was subsequently shut out of the Nixon campaign operation by John Mitchell (a partner from his law firm), who considered him overly ambitious. Mitchell, who became U.S. Attorney General during the first Nixon term, was subsequently caught up as a central figure in the Watergate scandal, from 1972 to 1974.

== Deputy Counsel to President Nixon ==
Sears served as Deputy Counsel to the President from 1969-70.

== Returns to private sector ==
Sears then left the White House, to join the law firm of Gadsby & Hannah, in Washington, DC, where he worked from 1970-76. He has been a partner in the Washington law firm of Baskin and Sears since 1977.

== Political adviser: manages Reagan's nomination bids ==
Sears managed Ronald Reagan's 1976 presidential bid, when Reagan ran in the Republican primaries against incumbent President Gerald Ford, and almost won the nomination.

He again managed Reagan's presidential bid in 1980 but was fired and replaced by William Casey on the day Reagan won the New Hampshire primary. Sears had run the national operation out of Washington and was a rival of Edwin Meese, Michael Deaver, and Lyn Nofziger in California. They did not trust Sears and believed he was trying to consolidate power at the expense of many longtime Reagan friends and backers.

Reagan told journalist and presidential scholar Theodore White that "There was a feeling that I was just kind of a spokesman for John Sears." Sears had been attempting to consolidate power in the Reagan campaign in 1980. He overstepped his bounds, leading to his firing. William Casey was hired to take his place. Casey (later appointed to head the Central Intelligence Agency by President Reagan) demanded administrative control of the campaign, but had no desire to control policy and by extension the personnel choices of the Reagan campaign; this was something John Sears was boldly attempting to control.

Sears told author Craig Shirley in 2006 that after being fired from the 1980 Reagan campaign, he never spoke with either Ronald or Nancy Reagan again.

== Lobbyist for South African apartheid regime ==
In the 1980s, Sears was "the highest paid" American lobbyist for South Africa's apartheid regime, "commanding an annual fee of $500,000."

== Incorrectly identified as Deep Throat ==
In 2000 Leonard Garment incorrectly identified Sears as Deep Throat in his book In Search of Deep Throat. Sears then requested that Bob Woodward and Carl Bernstein (who unmasked Watergate with the help of Deep Throat) publicly deny it was him, and Bernstein complied. (Later it was revealed by Woodward that W. Mark Felt, former Deputy FBI Director was "Deep Throat".)

Sears served as a political analyst for NBC Today, the popular television broadcast, from 1984-85. He resided in McLean, Virginia. Sears died in Miami on March 26, 2020, from a heart attack.
