= Citizens for the Republic =

American political action committee

- Formation: 1977
- Founder: Ronald Reagan
- Type: Political action committee

Citizens for the Republic (CFTR) is an American political action committee founded in 1977 by Ronald Reagan, five months after he narrowly lost his bid for the 1976 Republican Party (GOP) presidential nomination to Gerald Ford The committee was first directed by Reagan aide Lyn Nofziger. Under American tax law, it is a 527 organization.

== Organizational history ==
According to the CFTR website, "Reagan took the tired, run-down GOP [of the Ford-Nixon years] and turned it into a vibrant political force which drew sustenance from the millions of conservative Americans who believed in these principles."

By the time Reagan unseated Jimmy Carter to become president in 1980, the group continued to be active throughout the 1980s, eventually becoming dormant following President Reagan's departure from office. The Executive Director was Curtis Mack, who became Assistant Secretary of Commerce for Oceans and Atmosphere and Deputy Administrator of the National Oceanic and Atmospheric Administration following Reagan's re-election in 1984. Mack was succeeded by Wendy Borcherdt.

In 2009, CFTR was revived by Craig Shirley, a political consultant who has written two best-selling books on the Reagan campaigns of 1976 and 1980. Shirley remains the chairman of Citizens for the Republic. CFTR describes itself as a "national organization dedicated to revitalizing the conservative movement [through] education, grassroots organization, advocacy, and political activism ... [to promote] the principles of limited government, maximum freedom, personal responsibility, peace through strength, and defense of the dignity of every individual.

In the summer of 2013, CFTR announced that it was developing a new political rating system of lawmakers. Its website said scores would be based on loyalty to the principles of the Constitution of the United States and the protection of liberty.

CFTR endorses political candidates. In 1978, in one of its more surprising actions, it supported Jim Reese, former mayor of Odessa, Texas in his Republican challenge to George W. Bush in the race for Texas's 19th congressional district seat. Bush defeated Reese and then lost to the Democrat Kent Hance.

In June 2013, CFTR announced support for the author and columnist Quin Hillyer, a former press secretary to former U.S. Representative Bob Livingston of Louisiana. Hillyer was a Republican candidate in Alabama's 1st congressional district special election, 2013 to succeed Jo Bonner, who resigned in August to take a position as vice chancellor with the University of Alabama at Tuscaloosa. Hillyer was eliminated after finishing fourth in the Republican primary.

CFTR directors include former Attorney General of the United States Ed Meese, former Reagan policy advisor Peter D. Hannaford, and Mari Maseng Will, former Reagan White House Communications Director, speechwriter and political consultant and wife of columnist George Will. The late former Reagan policy advisor Peter D. Hannaford also served as a director. The organization is based at 122 South Patrick Street in Alexandria, Virginia.
