= Mari Maseng Will =

American politician and adviser (born 1954)

Mari Maseng
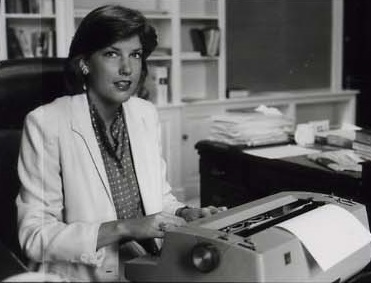
- Maseng in 1981

White House Communications Director
- In office July 1, 1988 – January 20, 1989
- President: Ronald Reagan
- Preceded by: Tom Griscom
- Succeeded by: David Demarest

8th Director of the Office of Public Liaison
- In office May 12, 1986 – July 1987
- President: Ronald Reagan
- Preceded by: Linda Chavez
- Succeeded by: Rebecca Range

Personal details
- Born: Mari Maseng; March 15, 1954 (age 72) Chicago, Illinois, U.S.
- Party: Republican
- Spouse: George Will (m. 1991)
- Children: 1
- Education: University of South Carolina (BA)

Mari Maseng Will (born March 15, 1954) is a Republican adviser who has worked for President Ronald Reagan, Senator Robert Dole and Governor Rick Perry. She was also an adviser to Scott Walker's presidential campaign and Ted Cruz's and Tim Scott’s presidential campaigns.

== Career ==
Maseng served President Reagan in the White House three times. She was assistant to the president and director of communications from June 1988 to January 1989. Before that she served as deputy assistant to the president and director of the Office of Public Liaison from May 1986 to July 1987 and she was a speechwriter for President Reagan from January 1981 to November 1983. She was assistant secretary of Transportation for Public Affairs from November 1983 to April 1985.

Maseng was Robert Dole's press secretary during his 1980 quest for the Republican presidential nomination. She held the same job for Dole in 1987-88, until Bush clinched the nomination. For the third time Maseng was communications director of Dole's 1996 campaign.

Maseng was brought in as a debate coach for the Rick Perry 2012 presidential campaign during the staff upheaval in the fall of 2011 and continued in that capacity for the rest of the campaign. She earlier worked for Michele Bachmann prior to her announcement for president.

Maseng is the principal of Maseng Communications and provides services to corporations, trade associations and political clients in the areas of public relations strategy, message development, speechwriting, and presentation training. She is a debate coach for presidential, US Senate, US House and gubernatorial candidates.

Political clients have included Utah Senator Mike Lee, former Nebraska Senator Ben Sasse, Texas Senator Ted Cruz, South Carolina Senator Tom Scott, Tennessee Governor Bill Lee, former Wisconsin Governor Scott Walker, former Illinois Governor Bruce Rauner, former Nevada Attorney General Adam Laxalt, Former Georgia Representative and House Speaker Newt Gingrich, among many others.

=== Activism ===
Maseng is a director of the political action committee, Citizens for the Republic, founded in January 1977 by Ronald Reagan and revived in 2009 by, now chairman, Craig Shirley after a period of dormancy following President Reagan's departure from office.

== Personal life ==
Maseng graduated from the University of South Carolina (B.A., 1975) In 1991, she married columnist and TV commentator George Will. They have one child, David, born in 1992, and live in the Washington D.C. area.

Political offices
Preceded by Linda Chavez	Director of the Office of Public Liaison; 1986–1987	Succeeded by Rebecca Range
Preceded by Tom Griscom	White House Director of Communications; 1988–1989	Succeeded by David Demarest
