= Men at Work (disambiguation) =

Men at Work are an Australian rock band.

Men at Work may also refer to:

- Men at Work (1990 film), a 1990 American action comedy
- Men at Work (2006 film), a 2006 Iranian film
- Men at Work 2, a 2020 Dutch film
- Men at Work (TV series), a 2012 American sitcom
- Men at Work: The Craft of Baseball, a 1990 book by George Will
- Men at Work!, a 1999 eroge video game produced by Studio e.go!
- "Men at Work", a 1989 song by Kool G Rap & DJ Polo from Road to the Riches
- "Men at Work", a short story by Graham Greene in his collection Twenty-One Stories

== See also ==
- Aan: Men at Work, a 2004 Bollywood film
- Man @ Work, a 2003 album by Colin Hay
