= CCIM =

CCIM is an abbreviation that may refer to:

- Certified Commercial Investment Member, a recognized expert in the disciplines of commercial and investment real estate
- Central Council of Indian Medicine, a statutory body in India
- A former reporting mark of Corpus Christi Terminal Railroad
- Council of Jewish Communities of Morocco, an organization for Moroccan Jews established during the French protectorate
