= Quin Hillyer =

American newspaper columnist and writer (born 1964)

- Born: Richard Quin Edmonson Hillyer; March 16, 1964 (age 62); New Orleans, Louisiana
- Occupation: Journalist

Richard Quin Edmonson Hillyer (born March 16, 1964) is an American conservative newspaper columnist and writer.

He unsuccessfully sought the Republican nomination for the United States House of Representatives from Alabama's 1st congressional district in the 2013 special election in that district, finishing fourth in the Republican primary.

== Education and career ==
Hillyer was born and raised in New Orleans, Louisiana, and graduated from high school in 1982 before matriculating at Georgetown University in Washington, D.C. and graduating cum laude in 1986.

After his graduation Hillyer joined the New Orleans Times-Picayune as a correspondent before a term as research/issues director for the Louisiana gubernatorial campaign of U.S. Representative Bob Livingston in 1987. He served as an unpaid director in the state campaign for Pete Dupont’s 1988 GOP presidential bid. A former page at the 1980 Republican National Convention, Hillyer attended the 1988 Republican convention as an alternate delegate from the state of Louisiana.

In 1989, Hillyer became managing editor of Gambit, a weekly newsmagazine in the New Orleans area. Prior to Gambit, he was a founding board member of the Louisiana Coalition Against Racism and Nazism, a group formed to defeat the Senate candidacy of David Duke, and helped reveal Duke's continuing neo-Nazi ties.

In 1991 he began working as a congressional staffer, rising to the level of press secretary within the office of Congressman Bob Livingston by 1995.

After the 1996 elections Hillyer returned to the private sector, where he returned to journalism and political commentary. In 1997, he joined the editorial staff of the Arkansas Democrat-Gazette, focusing on both local and national issues during the term of then-governor Mike Huckabee. In 1998, Hillyer joined the editorial desk at the Mobile Register where he covered statewide politics and their effect on the city. Hillyer received the Carmage Walls Commentary Award from the Southern Newspaper Publishers Association and the Green Eyeshade Award for commentary from the Society of Professional Journalists.

Hillyer returned to Washington in 2006, serving as a managing director at Qorvis Communications, and executive editor of The American Spectator before assuming the post of Associate Editorial Page Editor at The Washington Examiner in 2008. From 2009 through 2011, he was a senior editorial writer at The Washington Times. He remains a senior editor and columnist at the Spectator.

Hillyer’s articles have appeared in many publications, including the Wall Street Journal, Washington Post, National Review, the New Republic, The Guardian (UK), and Investor’s Business Daily. His television appearances have included Fox News, MSNBC, CNN and CBN on various political issues, particularly in the 2008 campaign.

== 2013 congressional candidacy ==
On May 23, 2013, six-term Republican U.S. Representative Jo Bonner announced he would resign from Congress effective August 15, 2013 to become a vice chancellor at the University of Alabama. Hillyer made his announcement to seek the Republican nomination for Bonner's seat one day later, telling his audience at the American Spectator: "I am a constitutional conservative—and an 'opportunity society' conservative as well, hearkening back to the Reagan-Kemp era of prosperity and liberty. Free men and women, with free minds, in a free market, produce abundance and a vibrant society."

Hillyer received outside support from Rick Santorum, who recorded a radio ad purchased by Citizens United Political Victory Fund. He also garnered the endorsement of Citizens for the Republic, the former Ronald W. Reagan political action committee based in Alexandria, Virginia.

== Personal life ==
Hillyer is married and lives in Mobile, Alabama, where he serves on the editorial on the editorial board of the Louisiana statewide newspapers, the Times-Picayune and the Advocate.
