= Jack Koehler =

American journalist (1930–2012)

White House Communications Director
- In office March 1, 1987 – March 13, 1987
- President: Ronald Reagan
- Preceded by: Pat Buchanan
- Succeeded by: Tom Griscom

Personal details
- Born: Wolfgang Koehler; June 11, 1930 Dresden, Weimar Republic
- Died: September 28, 2012 (aged 82) Stamford, Connecticut, U.S.
- Party: Republican

John O. Koehler (June 11, 1930 – September 28, 2012) was a German-born American journalist and executive for the Associated Press, who also briefly served as the White House Communications Director in 1987 during the Reagan administration. Following the end of the Cold War and German Reunification, Koehler devoted his retirement to researching Cold War espionage and published two works of popular history about the foreign and domestic activities of the East German Stasi and the Warsaw Pact's "Cold War against the Catholic Church." Following his death in 2012, Koehler was buried with full military honors at Arlington National Cemetery.

== Early life and education ==
Koehler was born Wolfgang Koehler in Dresden, Germany, but fled the city to escape the invasion of Soviet troops into Germany towards the end of World War II. He soon found a position as a German language interpreter for the United States Army when he was a teenager. He emigrated to Canada after World War II and then immigrated to the United States in 1954. Koehler enlisted in the U.S. Army, where he worked in military intelligence. He legally changed his name to John Koehler after moving to the United States.

== Career ==
Koehler took a position with the Associated Press as a foreign correspondent in Berlin and Bonn, West Germany. He then became the Associated Press' bureau chief in Newark, New Jersey. He rose to become the assistant general manager and managing director of AP's world services, a position he held until his retirement in 1985.

The United States Information Agency recruited Koehler to lobby on behalf of the Afghan resistance following the Soviet invasion of Afghanistan. He traveled to Pakistan and France to focus on helping the Afghan rebels get their messages out to uncensored media and to foreign governments.

In 1987, Koehler, who was friends with Ronald Reagan, became the White House Communications Director. However, Koehler resigned after just one week in the White House. It had just appeared in the media that Koehler had been forcibly trained as a child soldier by the Deutsches Jungvolk, a Nazi Party extreme youth paramilitary wing, when he was ten years old and delivered ammunition to anti-aircraft crews during the 1945 incendiary Bombing of Dresden by the Royal Air Force. Koehler insisted that his coercive training and use as a child soldier was not the reason for his resignation and dismissed the Jungvolk as "the Boy Scouts run by the Nazi party". Rather, he said, he wanted to give his successor enough time to choose a new communication team. Koehler then left the White House temporarily to start an international consulting firm. On 9 December 1988, Koehler was appointed by President Reagan to a position in the National Commission for Employment Policy of the United States Department of Labor.

== Historian of espionage ==
Koehler spent much of his later life as a Cold War-era historian of espionage, while using the former East German Stasi archives and his experiences and connections from his career in the U.S. intelligence community to document and expose the formerly covert activities of Soviet Bloc intelligence services and those who spied for them worldwide.

=== East Germany ===
In February 1992, former East German secret police chief Erich Mielke was belatedly brought to trial for the 9 August 1931 first degree murders of Berlin Police Captains Paul Anlauf and Franz Lenck as well as the attempted murder of Senior Sergeant Max Willig. At the time he acted as one of two triggermen in the 1931 cop killings, Mielke had been a young street-fighter in the Parteiselbstschutz, the paramilitary wing of the Communist Party of Germany (KPD), which bore strong similarities to the Nazi stormtroopers. Mielke was acting under orders of his KPD superiors Heinz Neumann, Hans Kippenberger, and Walter Ulbricht. The evidence for Mielke's guilt was drawn from the original police files, the transcripts from the 1934 trial of his co-conspirators, and a handwritten memoir in which Mielke revealed that his role in, "the Bülowplatz Affair," had been his reason for fleeing to Moscow from the Weimar Republic in 1931. All had been found in Mielke's house safe during a police search in 1990. Mielke was believed to have kept the documents for the purpose of "blackmailing Honecker and other East German leaders." Jack Koehler also testified as a witness for the prosecution that Mielke had boasted of his involvement in the 1931 Bülowplatz murders during a confrontation at Leipzig in 1965. At the time of their conversation, Koehler was working covertly for the U.S. Intelligence Community, while under journalistic cover at the Associated Press. Erich Mielke was convicted of two counts of murder and one of attempted murder and, on 26 October 1993, a panel of three judges and two jurors handed down a sentence of six years' imprisonment.

In his 1999 book-length history of the East German Stasi, Koehler documented the formerly covert domestic and foreign activities of East Germany's secret police, particularly under Mielke's 1957-1989 leadership. In the process, Koehler, knowing that a comparison of the GDR to Nazi Germany would really sting, termed the Stasi, "The Red Gestapo". He particularly exposed the collusion of the GDR with death squads run by Libyan diplomats and in the training and arming of terrorist organizations dedicating to attacking NATO, United States military personnel in Western Europe, and the State of Israel. Koehler also accused Erich Mielke, Markus Wolf, and the Stasi military advisors they assigned to Ethiopia to assist Far Left dictator Mengistu Haile Mariam of complicity in genocide. Furthermore, Koehler, as part of his research process, also interviewed Holocaust survivor and Nazi hunter Simon Wiesenthal, who accused the Stasi of routinely using miles of secret files on unprosecuted Nazi war crimes to blackmail Nazi war criminals into spying for the GDR. Wiesenthal also told Koehler, "The Stasi was much, much worse than the Gestapo, if you consider only the oppression of its own people. The Gestapo had 40,000 officials watching a country of 80 million, while the Stasi employed 102,000 to control only 17 million."

=== Catholic Church and the Cold War ===
Koehler's history of the decades long vendetta against the Roman Catholic Church by the Soviet secret police and Soviet Bloc intelligence services was published in August 2009. Beginning with the execution of Monsignor Konstanty Budkiewicz in the basement of Moscow's Lubyanka Prison on Easter Sunday 1923, Koehler documented how the religious persecution of the Catholic Church in Russia began almost immediately after the October Revolution.

Citing documents in both the Polish and East German secret police archives, as well as sources in both Western and former Soviet Bloc intelligence, as well as the Commission for the Prosecution of Crimes against the Polish Nation, Koehler accused Fr. Jerzy Dąbrowski (d. 1990), the late former bishop of Gniezno, of spying for both the Polish SB and the Soviet KGB while studying art in Rome between 1961 and 1970. Fr. Dąbrowski was the source for highly valued information about the inner workings of the Second Vatican Council, which Fr. Dąbrowski extracted, based on careful coaching from his handlers behind the scenes, from the Polish delegation attending the council. As part of his research process, Koehler was able to acquire copies of Fr. Dąbrowski's spy reports on Vatican II from the Stasi Records Agency. According to Fr. Dąbrowski's sources, the council had been called at the urging of anti-Communist Catholic clergy in West Germany, with the intentions of both strengthening the Church internally and going upon the offense in response to the global rise of both Marxism and Communism.

For example, the KGB station in Rome reported after debriefing Dąbrowski, "The majority of the council participants asserted the need to replace Latin in services with national languages, to adapt rites to local customs and traditions of the population. 'We need to meet the times and make the liturgy more accessible for the wide mass of believers who do not understand the Latin language', they said... 'The council must keep in mind missionary goals and the task of uniting the churches. The Latin language is an obstacle to this.' ...'Marxism is finding more and more supporters because it preaches in the local languages. In order to oppose Marxism, we must conduct the liturgy in national languages. If the people cannot understand the liturgy they will go over to the marxists.' In this way, under the external theological cover, it is not difficult to discern the political reality: the striving to increase the influence of religion and the church in the countries of Africa, Asia, and Latin America, to counter the spreading of the ideas of communism, and to unite the efforts of the christian churches in the battle with atheism and communism."

Fr. Dąbrowski's reports on the council were considered so important that Yuri Andropov was briefed upon them immediately after taking command of the KGB in 1967 and cited them as grounds to order a mass offensive against the Catholic Church beginning in 1969. Even though the Second Vatican Council had allegedly been called to strengthen the Church as an ally of the Free World in the ongoing Cold War, after its completion, according to Koehler, the KGB was easily able to recruit moles inside every Department of the Roman Curia.

During the early 1970s, Koehler alleges that a highly placed mole inside the Vatican's diplomatic service was secretly recording conversations between Pope Paul VI and foreign dignitaries. In a particularly damaging case, a 22 February 1973 meeting between the Pope and an increasingly desperate South Vietnamese Foreign Minister Trần Văn Lắm was recorded, transcribed and shared with the North Vietnamese intelligence service. At the time, a north–south ceasefire was in effect, but Minister Trần was expressing to the Pope in vain the mounting terror of his Government about what was seen as South Vietnam's abandonment by its allies. According to Koehler, who found a transcript of the conversation in the East German archives and confirmed its authenticity, "when this transcript reached Hanoi, the Communist leadership would not have harbored any doubts that their resumption of armed aggression would go unopposed by any Western Government."

In a chapter-long critique of both West German and Vatican Ostpolitik, Koehler documented how the Czechoslovak StB was able in the early 1970s to successfully plant a ceramic statue of the Blessed Virgin, which contained a covert listening device inside the office of Vatican Secretary of State Cardinal Agostino Casaroli. A second listening device was located very close to the statue and was concealed inside an armoire. The operation was carried out with the assistance of the Cardinal's own nephew, Marco Torreta, who, according to Italian counterintelligence agents, had been an informant for the KGB since 1950. The intention was to compromise as much as possible the Cardinal's efforts to negotiate an end to the religious persecution of Catholics behind the Iron Curtain. Both listening devices proved extremely damaging, particularly due to the Cardinal's decades at his post. Both devices were only uncovered in 1990, as part of a massive investigation into the 1981 attempt on the life of Pope John Paul II which had been ordered by Italian investigative magistrate Rosario Priore. Both listening devices had still been transmitting all that time.

Koehler also alleges, based on detailed documentary material in both Polish and Soviet archives, that the 1981 assassination attempt by Mehmet Ali Ağca against Pope John Paul II was a Soviet intelligence operation which had been unanimously voted upon in advance by the Politburo, the ruling Central Committee of the Communist Party of the Soviet Union. In a document that still survives, all members of the Party Central Committee, including future Soviet Premier Mikhail Gorbachev, co-signed the orders.

== Death ==
Koehler died from pancreatic cancer at his home in Stamford, Connecticut, on September 28, 2012, at the age of 82. He was buried with full military honors at Arlington National Cemetery.

== Selected publications ==
- Koehler, John O. (2009). Spies in the Vatican: the Soviet Union's cold war against the Catholic Church. New York. ISBN 978-1-60598-050-8. OCLC 286439472.
- Koehler, John O. (1999). Stasi: the untold story of the East German secret police. Boulder, Colo.: Westview Press. ISBN 0-8133-3409-8. OCLC 39256274.

Political offices
| Preceded by Pat Buchanan | White House Director of Communications; 1987 | Succeeded by Tom Griscom |
