= Brainerd High School (Tennessee) =

Public high school in Chattanooga, Tennessee, United States

Location
- 1020 N Moore Rd; Chattanooga, Tennessee; 37411; United States; 35.0280°N 85.2185°W

Information
- Type: Public
- Opened: 1960
- School district: Hamilton County Schools
- NCES School ID: 470159000626
- Principal: Crystal Sorrells
- Teaching staff: 46.12 (FTE)
- Grades: 9-12
- Enrollment: 732 (2023-2024)
- Student to teacher ratio: 15.87
- Colors: Columbia blue, red and white
- Team name: Panthers
- Website: https://bhs.hcde.org/

Brainerd High School is a public high school located in Chattanooga, Tennessee. It is operated by the Hamilton County school district.

== Historical significance ==
Brainerd High was the site of an important Supreme Court decision regarding the use of racially-charged symbols, including the display of Confederate flag and the playing of "Dixie" as the school pep song. A 1971 ruling affirmed the right of the school principal to prohibit such symbols, given the racial turbulence at the school in the previous two years. Bans on Confederate symbols in public schools continue to rest on this precedent today.

== Athletics ==
Several sports teams are offered at the school as the Panthers, including baseball, basketball, cross country, football, golf, tennis, track and field, and wrestling. The Panthers are in TSSAA's Division I, Class 3A.

- Baseball - 1965
- Boys' basketball - 1984, 1988, 1992
- Girls' basketball - 1984
- Boys' cross country - 1999
- Boys' track and field - 1966, 1967, 1970, 1977, 1979, 1986, 1996, 1998, 1999, 2000, 2005, 2006, 2007, 2008, 2017
- Girls' track and field - 1978, 1985, 1986, 1990, 1995, 1996, 1997, 1998, 1999, 2000, 2001, 2008, 2016.

== Demographics ==
According to U.S. News & World Report, 93% of the student body is African American, 4% is white, 1% is Hispanic, and 0.2% is Native American. 53% of the student body is male, and 47% is female.

== Notable alumni ==
- George S. Clinton, 1965
- Gary Drinnon, 1968
- Tom Griscom, 1971
- Leslie Jordan, 1973
- Venus Lacy, basketball player
- Malcolm Mackey, 1989
