= Tom Griscom =

American lobbyist (born 1949)

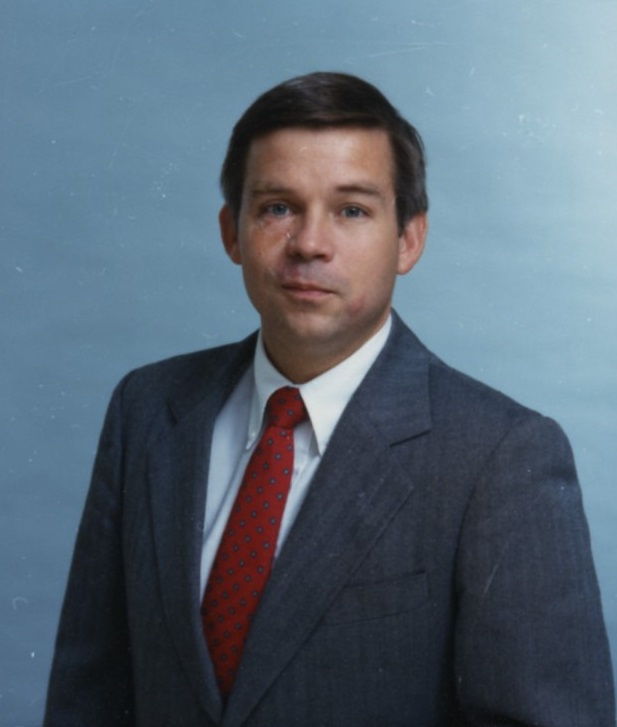

White House Communications Director
- In office April 2, 1987 – July 1, 1988
- President: Ronald Reagan
- Preceded by: Jack Koehler
- Succeeded by: Mari Maseng

Personal details
- Born: 1949 (age 75–76) Chattanooga, Tennessee, U.S.
- Political party: Republican
- Education: University of Tennessee at Chattanooga (BA)

Thomas Cecil Griscom (born 1949) served as Director of White House Communications under President Ronald Reagan, was a top aide and adviser for a decade to U.S. Senator Howard Baker of Tennessee, and was the executive editor and publisher of the Chattanooga Times Free Press from October 1999 to June 30, 2010.

Griscom served in the 1990s as the executive vice president for external relations for the RJ Reynolds Tobacco company, as an employee of Rupert Murdoch's News Ltd; and as a public relations consultant with Powell-Tate.

In December 1998, Fortune magazine's "The Power of 25: the influence merchants" named Griscom, along with other ex-White House staff, ex-politicians and sons-of-politicians, as a key lobbyist in Washington.

Griscom is a graduate of Brainerd High School and the University of Tennessee at Chattanooga.

== Life and career ==
=== Politics ===
In 1978 Griscom joined the staff of Senator Baker and served as press secretary. In 1985-86, after Baker's retirement from the Senate, Griscom served as the executive director of the National Republican Senatorial Committee (NRSC), and was charged with the task of overseeing the re-election efforts of the Republican majority in the Senate. He later became part of the Reagan administration in 1987, while Baker was chief of staff. As Baker's senior staff person, he essentially ran day-to-day operations at the White House, and he maintained the strong links between the administration and the Republican Party.

His most notable claim during this period was that, in 1987, as communications director at the White House, he approved and promoted (against diplomatic advice) Peter Robinson's draft speech made at the Berlin Wall, where President Reagan demanded that Soviet leader Mikhail Gorbachev "tear down this wall".

=== Reynolds Tobacco ===
In 1990, he joined Reynolds Tobacco as head of its external relations program, and over the next 10 years he was responsible for the company's strategic operations against the growing anti-smoking forces. He also administered and organized the company's involvement in the many cooperative campaigns conducted with Philip Morris and the Tobacco Institute in lobbying the United States Congress to block anti-smoking legislation. RJR also took a lead role at this time in conducting misinformation campaigns for media and public consumption—especially in the promotion of the idea that health regulations were largely the product of junk science.

Not long after joining RJR, Griscom became a key director on the management committee of the Tobacco Institute, responsible for secretly funding friendly think tanks and other organizations, and for organizing scientists, lawyers and other business allies to attack regulatory measures that blocked cigarette advertising, or those that introduced environmental and health regulations.

Steve Milloy, who ran the fake "scientific grassroots" organisation known as the Advancement of Sound Science Coalition (TASSC) and its junk science website for Philip Morris on behalf of the tobacco industry, was transferred in mid-1996 to the control of Reynolds under Griscom when TASSC and the junkscience.com links with Philip Morris were exposed.

Griscom subcontracted the administration of this "sound-science" operation to Jody Powell (ex-press secretary to President Jimmy Carter) and Sheila Tate (First Lady Nancy Reagan's adviser) at Powell-Tate. RJR and Powell-Tate also handled the distribution of Milloy's book, Science without Sense, supposedly published by the Cato Institute (which was itself funded by tobacco interests). Similar books were commissioned and payment laundered through think tanks for academic authors.

One other "successful" program run at this time was to characterise relatively harmless substances as "potentially cancerous" as part of the industry's "sound-science" campaign. Griscom's PR staff attempted to both promote and ridicule the idea that coffee could cause cancer via Milloy's junk-science web pages and op-ed articles planted in newspapers. This created the straw-man idea that everything enjoyable could be classed as potentially dangerous (to counter fears about passive smoking) and no one could live without taking the normal risks associated with living.

Griscom's communications and media division of RJR also hired state and federal lobbyists, planted ghost-written articles and letters to the editor in major newspapers and magazines and promoted seemingly normal tours by comedians, musicians, artists, etc. who were all carefully trained and contracted to promote the pro-smoking message.

In 1997-98, Griscom represented R.J. Reynolds on a long series of tobacco industry negotiations with the State Attorneys-General, the Justices Department, the White House and its agencies. This led to a February 1998 Master Settlement Agreement, in which the tobacco industry agreed to pay hundreds of millions of dollars in compensation for Medicaid costs associated with smoking to avoid charges under the Racketeer Influenced and Corrupt Organizations Act (RICO).

He left R.J. Reynolds in the later half of 1999 and returned to Chattanooga "to help shape the overall identity" of the city's now single daily print newspaper, formed after WEHCO Media bought and merged the fiercely competitive afternoon Free Press and the morning The Chattanooga Times to create the Chattanooga Times Free Press. On May 26, 2010, Griscom announced he would resign from the newspaper June 30, 2010.

== Personal life ==
Griscom is married to the former Marion Dobbins.

Political offices
Preceded by Jack Koehler	White House Communications Director; 1987–1988	Succeeded by Mari Maseng Will
