= National Memorial Park =

Cemetery in Virginia

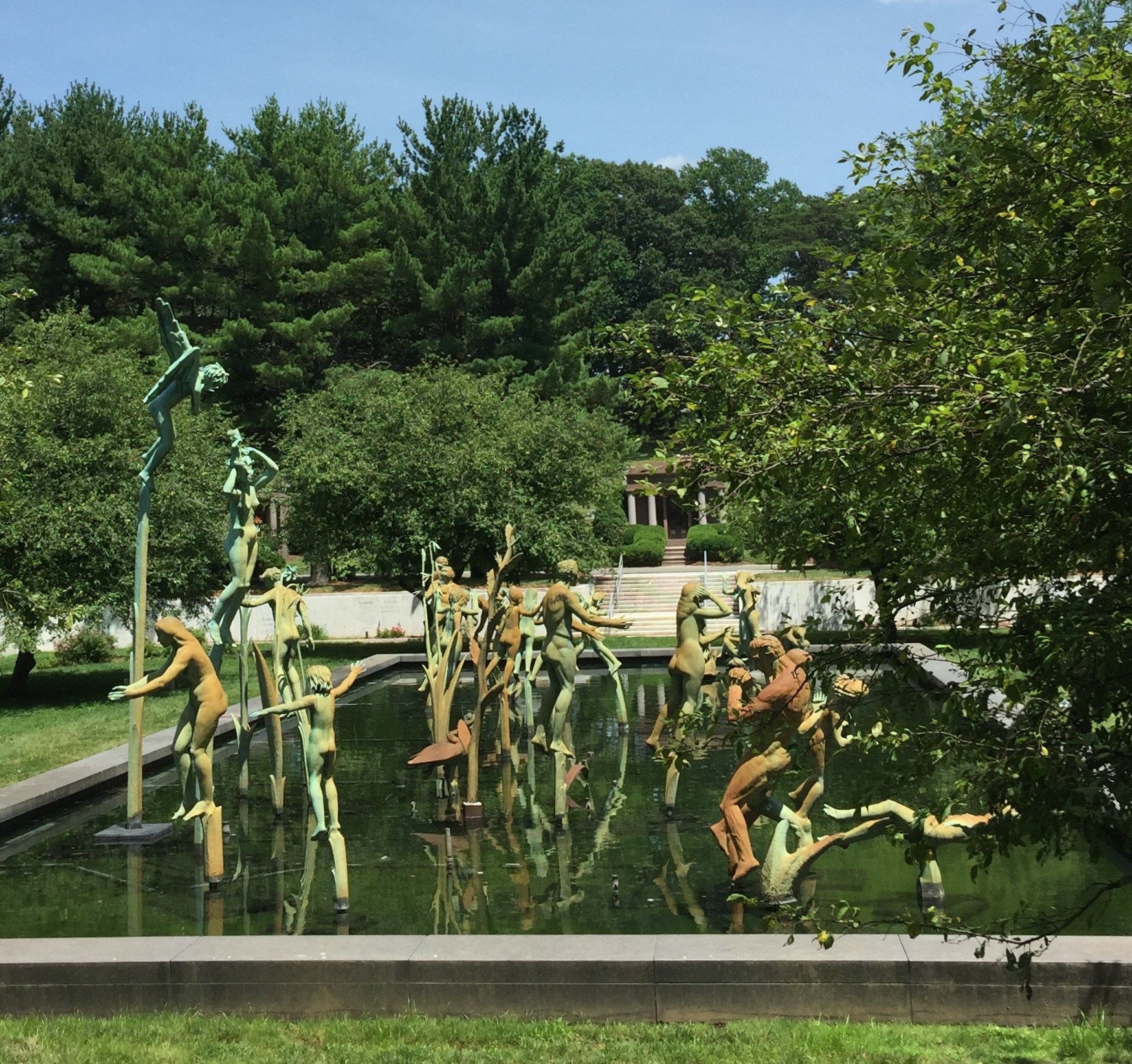
- Fountain of Faith sculpture garden
- Interactive map of National Memorial Park

Details
- Established: 1933
- Location: 7482 Lee Highway, Falls Church, Virginia 22042
- Country: United States
- Coordinates: 38°52′43″N 77°12′09″W
- Owned by: Service Corporation International, Houston, Texas
- Size: 168 acres
- No. of graves: 35,000
- Find a Grave: National Memorial Park

National Memorial Park is a cemetery in the Washington, D.C. suburb of Falls Church, Virginia. The cemetery is part of the National Funeral Home and National Memorial Park complex. The cemetery covers 168 acres, lined with fountains, trees, gardens, and sculptures. The complex is owned by Houston-based Service Corporation International.

== History ==
In 1933, local businessman Robert Marlowe purchased a Falls Church dairy farm. Over the years, the businesses shifted to funeral, bereavement, cremation and burial services, as well as a pet cemetery.

In 2009, The Washington Post reported that the facility was storing naked bodies in various stages of decomposition. As many as 200 bodies were stored on "makeshift gurneys in the garage" and "at least half a dozen veterans destined for the hallowed ground at Arlington National Cemetery were left in their coffins on a garage rack." (Note: White, Josh (2009-04-05). "Funeral Home Employees Say Bodies Were Mishandled". The Washington Post.)

Family members of an Army veteran whose remains were stored in an unrefrigerated garage asked the Fairfax County Commonwealth's Attorney to investigate the actions of the funeral home. The family of retired U.S. Army Colonel Andrew DeGraff filed a lawsuit alleging that the colonel's remains had been mishandled. (Note: White, Josh (2009-04-15). "Family Sues Funeral Home That Left Body in Garage". The Washington Post.)

In January 2001, approximately 174 bodies were transferred to National Memorial Park cemetery from the nearby Abbey Mausoleum, which was being closed and demolished following years of disrepair and vandalism.

== Notable burials ==
- Hedayat Amin Arsala (1942-2025), Afghan Politician
- Philip Pitt Campbell (1862–1941), U.S. Congressman from Kansas, 1903 to 1924.
- Charles Forrest Curry (1858–1930), U.S. Congressman from California, 1913 to 1930.
- Blossom Dearie (1924–2009), American jazz singer and dancer.
- Frances Foster (1924–1997), television and movie actress.
- Clay Kirby (1948–1991), Major League Baseball player, 1969 to 1976.
- Pietro Lazzari (1895–1979), sculptor.
- Oscar Raymond Luhring (1879–1944), U.S. Congressman from Indiana, 1919 to 1923, U.S. Circuit Court judge, 1930 to 1944.
- Wayne Vernal Millner (1913–1976), Hall of Fame professional football player from 1936 to 1941, World War II veteran.
- Lyn Nofziger (1924–2006), Political journalist and Reagan Administration appointee.
- Jim Ricca (1927–2007), American professional football player in the 1950s.
- Kyle Rote (1927–2002), Professional football player from 1951 to 1961.
- Harry Richard Sheppard (1885–1969), U.S. Congressman from California, 1937 to 1965.
- Paul Allman Siple (1908–1968), Antarctic scientist and explorer.
- Fereydoon Batmanghelidj (1931-2004), Iranian doctor, naturopath and writer.
