= Malcolm Mackey =

American basketball player (born 1970)

Personal information
- Born: July 11, 1970 (age 56) Chattanooga, Tennessee, U.S.
- Listed height: 6 ft 9 in (2.06 m)
- Listed weight: 248 lb (112 kg)

Career information
- High school: Brainerd (Chattanooga, Tennessee)
- College: Georgia Tech (1989–1993)
- NBA draft: 1993: 1st round, 27th overall pick
- Drafted by: Phoenix Suns
- Playing career: 1993–2005
- Position: Power forward / center
- Number: 27

Career history
- 1993–1994: Phoenix Suns
- 1994–1995: Omaha Racers
- 1995–1996: JDA Dijon
- 1996: Konya Kombassan
- 1996–1997: CB Murcia Arte
- 1997: Rockford Lightning
- 1997: Tiburones de Aguadilla
- 1997–1998: Cáceres CB
- 1998: León Caja España
- 1999: Sporting Athens
- 2000: Quad City Thunder
- 2000: Leones de Ponce
- 2000–2001: Media Broker Messina
- 2001: Atléticos de San Germán
- 2001–2002: JDA Dijon
- 2002–2003: Jilin Northeast Tigers
- 2003–2004: Besançon
- 2004–2005: Anwil Włocławek

Career highlights
- Second-team All-ACC (1991); Third-team All-ACC (1992); Third-team Parade All-American (1989)
- Stats at NBA.com
- Stats at Basketball Reference

Malcolm Malik Mackey (born July 11, 1970) is an American former professional basketball player who was selected by the Phoenix Suns in the first round (27th pick overall) of the 1993 NBA draft. Born in Chattanooga, Tennessee, Mackey played only one season in the NBA for the Suns, appearing in 22 games. He graduated from high school at Brainerd High School and played collegiately at Georgia Tech. He currently works as a consultant and advisor for the East Point Jaguars.

== Career statistics ==
Legend
GP	Games played	GS	Games started	MPG	Minutes per game
FG%	Field goal percentage	3P%	3-point field goal percentage	FT%	Free throw percentage
RPG	Rebounds per game	APG	Assists per game	SPG	Steals per game
BPG	Blocks per game	PPG	Points per game	**Bold**	Career high

=== NBA ===
==== Regular season ====
Year	Team	GP	GS	MPG	FG%	3P%	FT%	RPG	APG	SPG	BPG	PPG
1993–94	Phoenix	22	—	3.1	.378	.000	.500	1.1	0.0	0.0	0.1	1.5
