= David Demarest (politician) =

White House Communications Director
- In office January 20, 1989 – August 23, 1992
- President: George H. W. Bush
- Preceded by: Mari Maseng
- Succeeded by: Margaret D. Tutwiler

Personal details
- Born: David Franklin Demarest Jr. October 8, 1951 (age 74) Glen Ridge, New Jersey, U.S.
- Party: Republican
- Children: 2 daughters
- Education: University of Colorado, Boulder (attended); Upsala College (BA); Drew University (attended)

David Franklin Demarest Jr. (born October 8, 1951) is a former Vice President for Public Affairs, Stanford University and a former Republican operative who worked for Presidents Ronald Reagan and George H. W. Bush.

== Career ==
David Demarest began his Washington, D.C. career in the late 1970s, working with state and local political candidates on behalf of the Republican National Committee. Before 1977, he participated in several congressional campaigns in New Jersey. During the Reagan administration, he served in the Office of the U.S. Trade Representative, where he was Assistant U.S. Trade Representative for Public, Intergovernmental, and Private Sector Affairs. He was later Assistant Secretary of Labor for Public and Intergovernmental Affairs.

In 1988 Demarest was the communications director on the Bush-Quayle presidential campaign. He then served four years as member of the White House senior staff. As White House Communications Director, he worked directly with the President, the White House Chief of Staff, and the Cabinet, and in that capacity managed a broad range of White House communications activities, including presidential speechwriting, public liaison, media relations, and intergovernmental affairs.

Demarest was instrumental in directing the Willie Horton message during the 1988 presidential campaign and in setting up the crack buy in Lafayette Park that kicked off President Bush's war on drugs.

After Demarest left the White House, he became Executive Vice President and Director of Corporate Communications at Bank of America. In 1999, David became Executive Vice President for Global Corporate Relations at Visa.

== Personal life ==
David Demarest is the father of two daughters.

Political offices
Preceded by Mari Maseng	White House Director of Communications; 1989–1992	Succeeded by Margaret Tutwiler
