= Marian L. Tupy =

American author and academic

Marian L. Tupy is the founder and editor of HumanProgress.org, a coauthor of the Simon Abundance Index, and a senior fellow at the Center for Global Liberty and Prosperity.

Tupy received a BA in international relations and classics from the University of the Witwatersrand and a PhD in international relations from the University of St. Andrews.

== Books ==
- Superabundance: The Story of Population Growth, Innovation, and Human Flourishing on an Infinitely Bountiful Planet (2022)
- Ten Global Trends Every Smart Person Should Know: And Many Others You Will Find Interesting (2020)
