= Men at Work: The Craft of Baseball =

1990 book by George Will

- First edition
- Author: George Will
- Language: English
- Subject: Baseball
- Genre: Non-fiction
- Publisher: Macmillan Publishers
- Publication date: 1990
- Publication place: United States
- Pages: 353
- ISBN: 978-0-02-628470-7

Men at Work: The Craft of Baseball is a New York Times best-selling 1990 book about baseball by George Will. It was written by American Pulitzer Prize–winning author George Will and published by Macmillan Publishers. The book focuses on four successful Major League Baseball figures, three of them players, representing different aspects of baseball: a manager, a pitcher, a hitter, and a fielder.

== Background ==
In preparation for Men at Work, Will spent hundreds of hours interviewing five Major League Baseball figures: right fielder Tony Gwynn of the San Diego Padres, manager Tony La Russa of the Oakland Athletics, shortstop Cal Ripken Jr. of the Baltimore Orioles, pitcher Jim Gott of the Pittsburgh Pirates, and pitcher Orel Hershiser of the Los Angeles Dodgers. He discussed each person's approach to the game of baseball, choosing them because of their success in their roles and their strong work ethics. While researching for Men at Work over a period of three years, Will acquired 11 press passes that offer special locker-room privileges in Major League Baseball stadiums.

== Synopsis ==
In the book, Will discusses how each of the four subjects highlighted play, or in the case of La Russa, manage the game of baseball. It also discusses the history of the game, such as how Candy Cummings invented the curveball pitch in 1867. There are also statistics mentioned, as well as anecdotes. Will also inserts personal opinion, such as when he discusses his belief that baseball needs to have more walks and fewer strikeouts, and that Baltimore is the best baseball town.

== Release ==
Men at Work was published by Macmillan Publishers in 1990, a few days following the 32-day-long Major League Baseball lockout. The book has been described as taking a more serious approach to baseball than other books on the same subject. Reviews have complimented Will's discussion on baseball strategy and his approach to current baseball debates. The book was number one on the list of New York Times Non-Fiction Best Sellers for at least nine consecutive weeks immediately after its publication, making it one of the best-selling baseball books since Major League Pitcher Jim Bouton's Ball Four (1970).
