= Certified Commercial Investment Member =

CCIM Institute
- Formation: January 15, 1991; 35 years ago
- Tax ID no.: 36-3743268
- Legal status: 501(c)(6) business league
- Headquarters: Chicago, Illinois, United States
- Methods: The development of members engaged in the commercial investment real estate specialty through education programs and literature.
- President: Adam Palmer, CCIM, SIOR
- Chief Executive Officer: Paul Rumler
- Affiliations: National Association of Realtors, CCIM Technologies, Inc., CCIM Foundation
- Revenue: $14,631,345 (2018)
- Expenses: $13,688,338 (2018)
- Employees: 65 (2018)
- Volunteers: 260 (2018)
- Website: www.ccim.com

A Certified Commercial Investment Member (CCIM) is a recognized expert in the disciplines of commercial and investment real estate. The Designation is awarded by the CCIM Institute, formerly known as Commercial Investment Real Estate Institute (CIREI) of the National Association of Realtors. The CCIM Designation was originally established by the California Association of Realtors in 1954 under the name Certified Property Exchanger (CPE).].

A CCIM is a resource to the commercial real estate owner, investor, and user, and is among a corps of more than 13,000 professionals around the globe who hold the CCIM Designation. CCIM Designees live and work in the U.S., Canada, Mexico, and more than 35 other nations. International membership includes more than 1,000 professionals.

CCIMs must be proficient in the areas of investment analysis, market analysis, user decision analysis and financial analysis for commercial real estate. In 2007, CCIM Institute launched the Robert L. Ward Center for Real Estate Studies, which offers concentrated courses on specific topics. CCIMs have access to a suite of online technology tools through the Site To Do Business, and they can post properties for sale or lease through the online CCIMNet commercial real estate exchange.

== See also ==
- Real estate agent
- SIOR (Society of Industrial and Office Realtors)
