= Michael Deaver =

American political consultant (1938–2007)

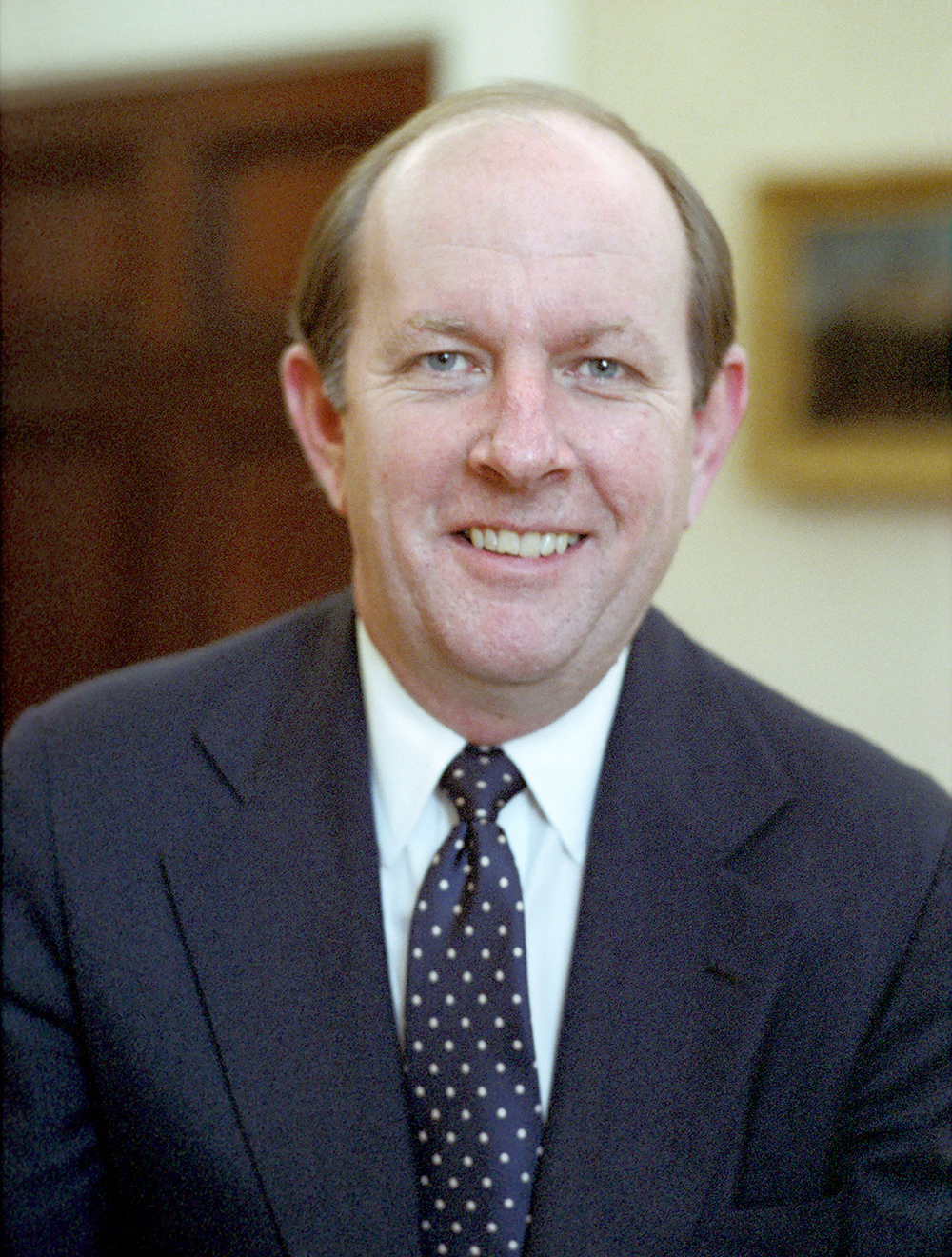
- Deaver in 1981

White House Deputy Chief of Staff
- In office January 20, 1981 – May 1985
- President: Ronald Reagan
- Preceded by: Landon Butler
- Succeeded by: Ken Duberstein

Personal details
- Born: Michael Keith Deaver; April 11, 1938 Bakersfield, California, U.S.
- Died: August 18, 2007 (aged 69) Bethesda, Maryland, U.S.
- Party: Republican
- Education: San Jose State University (BA)

Military service
- Branch/service: United States Air Force

Michael Keith Deaver (April 11, 1938 – August 18, 2007) was a member of President Ronald Reagan's White House staff who served as White House Deputy Chief of Staff under James Baker III and Donald Regan from January 1981 to May 1985.

== Early life ==
Deaver was born in Bakersfield, California, the son of Marian (née Mack) and Paul Sperling Deaver, a Shell Oil Co. distributor. He graduated from Desert High School at Edwards AFB, California in 1956. He received his bachelor's degree in political science from San Jose State College (now San Jose State University). Deaver was initiated and a member of the Delta Sigma Phi fraternity at San Jose State.

Deaver worked for IBM, served in the United States Air Force, and later was executive director of the Santa Clara County Republican Party. While Ronald Reagan was running for governor of California, Deaver worked as a political field representative for the California Republican Party, running several state assembly campaigns. After being elected governor, Reagan's chief of staff recruited Deaver to the administration, where he began a 30-year career working for Reagan and building a very close friendship with him and with Nancy Reagan. According to Kitty Kelley, his work for the latter earned him the disparaging nicknames "Nancy's Nancy" and "Lord of the Chamber Pot".

Deaver formed a consulting company after Reagan's term as governor. Reagan and his upcoming presidential campaigns were among his clients. Accompanying Reagan on his campaign plane in 1976, Deaver performed the Heimlich maneuver on Reagan to dislodge a peanut stuck in his throat and reportedly saved his life. Though initially he disliked the idea of moving to Washington, D.C., he ultimately agreed and was appointed Deputy Chief of Staff under President Reagan in 1981. His principal responsibilities were public relations and the president's schedule of events and speeches.

== White House career ==
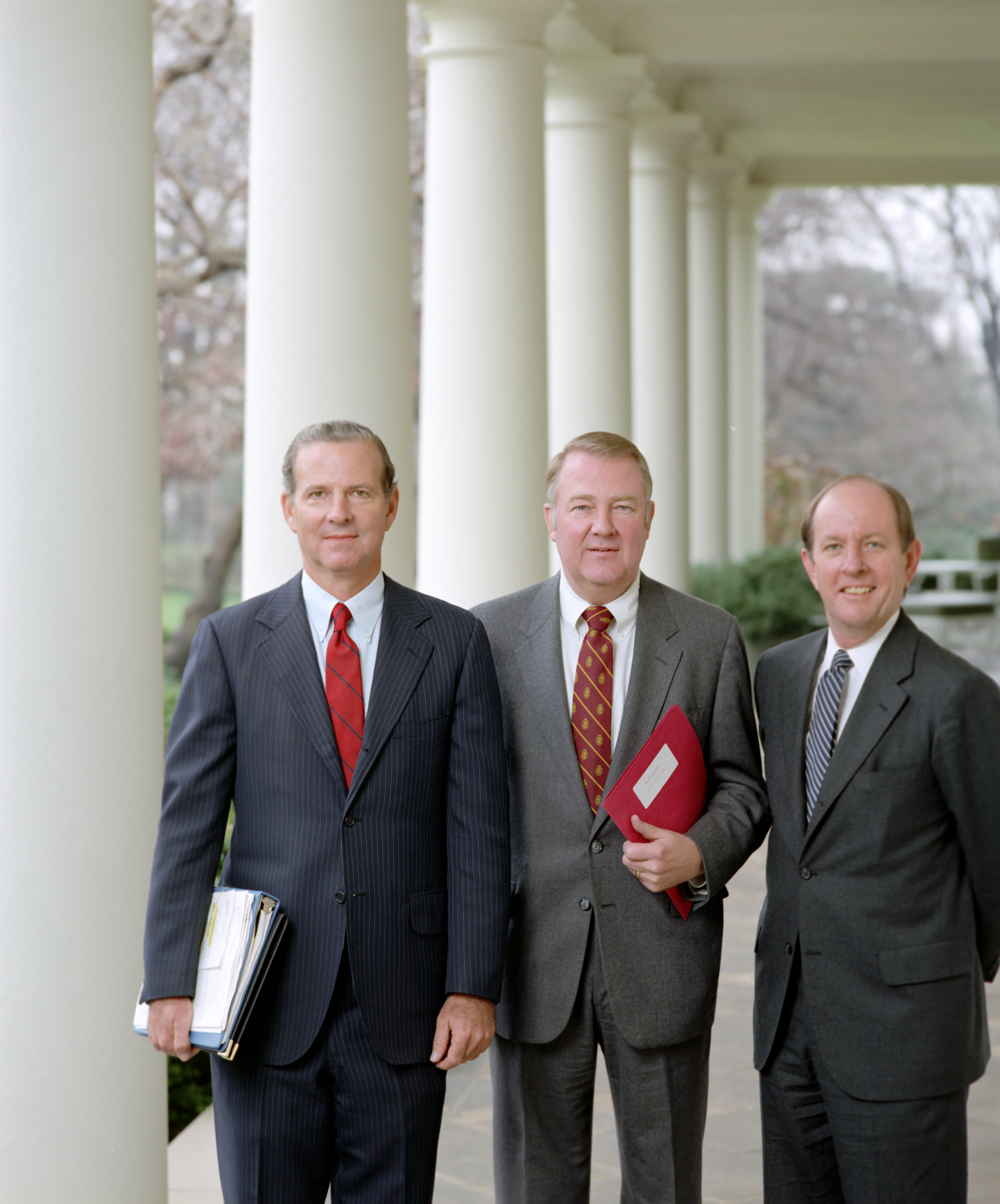
"The Troika": Chief of staff James Baker, Counselor to the president Ed Meese, and Deputy chief of staff Deaver at the White House, 1981

While serving on Reagan's staff, Deaver worked closely with Chief of Staff James Baker and Counselor to the President Ed Meese. They were known as "The Troika" by some observers of the White House due to their influence over policy.

As Deputy Chief of Staff, Deaver worked primarily on media management, forming how the public perceived Reagan, sometimes by engineering press events so that the White House set the networks' agenda for covering him.

On March 30, 1981, Deaver was present at the attempted assassination of Ronald Reagan; he stood feet away from John Hinckley Jr. as he fired at Reagan, wounding him. Deaver later supported Nancy Reagan in the hospital as she arrived.

Deaver resigned from the White House staff in May 1985. Health concerns were one reason for his resignation: he was a heavy drinker, consuming 1/5 gallon of whiskey daily and working under great pressure. He later wrote of that period in his life: "I was a sick guy."

== Perjury conviction ==
On March 18, 1987, Deaver was convicted of perjury for congressional testimony he had submitted. He was convicted on three of five counts of perjury stemming from statements to a congressional subcommittee and federal grand jury investigating his lobbying activities with administration officials. Deaver blamed alcoholism for lapses in memory and judgment. He was sentenced to three years in prison, but the sentence was reduced to three years of probation and a $100,000 fine. Deaver was also ordered to perform 1,500 hours of public service. In the final days of Reagan's presidency the question of a pardon arose, but Reagan noted in his diaries that Deaver had said he would not accept a pardon.

== Later life and death ==
Shortly after Deaver resigned from the White House, he formed Michael K. Deaver, Inc. and became a lobbyist. For a time he was in business with another Reagan aide, Peter D. Hannaford, in a public relations firm named Deaver and Hannaford.

In his later years, Deaver wrote three books: Behind the Scenes (1988; co-written with Mickey Herskowitz), A Different Drummer: My Thirty Years with Ronald Reagan (2001; foreword by Nancy Reagan), and Nancy: A Portrait of My Years with Nancy Reagan (2004). In 2005, he edited and published a collection of essays, Why I Am a Reagan Conservative.

Deaver also worked at the Washington, D.C. office of Edelman, a public relations agency, a role he held from 1992 to 2006, ultimately as chairman of the D.C. office. In a 2001 interview with the Los Angeles Times, Deaver said: "I've always said the only thing I did is light [Reagan] well... My job was filling up the space around the head. I didn't make Ronald Reagan. Ronald Reagan made me." According to Nancy Reagan, Deaver's greatest skill "was in arranging what were known as good visuals—televised events or scenes that would leave a powerful symbolic image in people's minds." In 2006, Deaver was awarded an honorary degree from Universidad Francisco Marroquín in Guatemala City, Guatemala.

Deaver died of pancreatic cancer on August 18, 2007, at age 69 at his home in Maryland. He is survived by his wife, Carolyn, and their two children. In a statement, Nancy Reagan said Deaver "was the closest of friends to both Ronnie and me in many ways, and he was like a son to Ronnie... We met great challenges together... I will miss Mike terribly."

== Books ==
- Deaver, Michael (with Mickey Herskowitz). Behind the Scenes (1988).
- Deaver, Michael (with a foreword by Nancy Reagan). A Different Drummer: My Thirty Years with Ronald Reagan (2001).
- Deaver, Michael. Nancy: A Portrait of My Years with Nancy Reagan (2004).
- Deaver, Michael. (Ed.) Why I Am a Reagan Conservative (2005).
