= George Will =

American political commentator (born 1941)

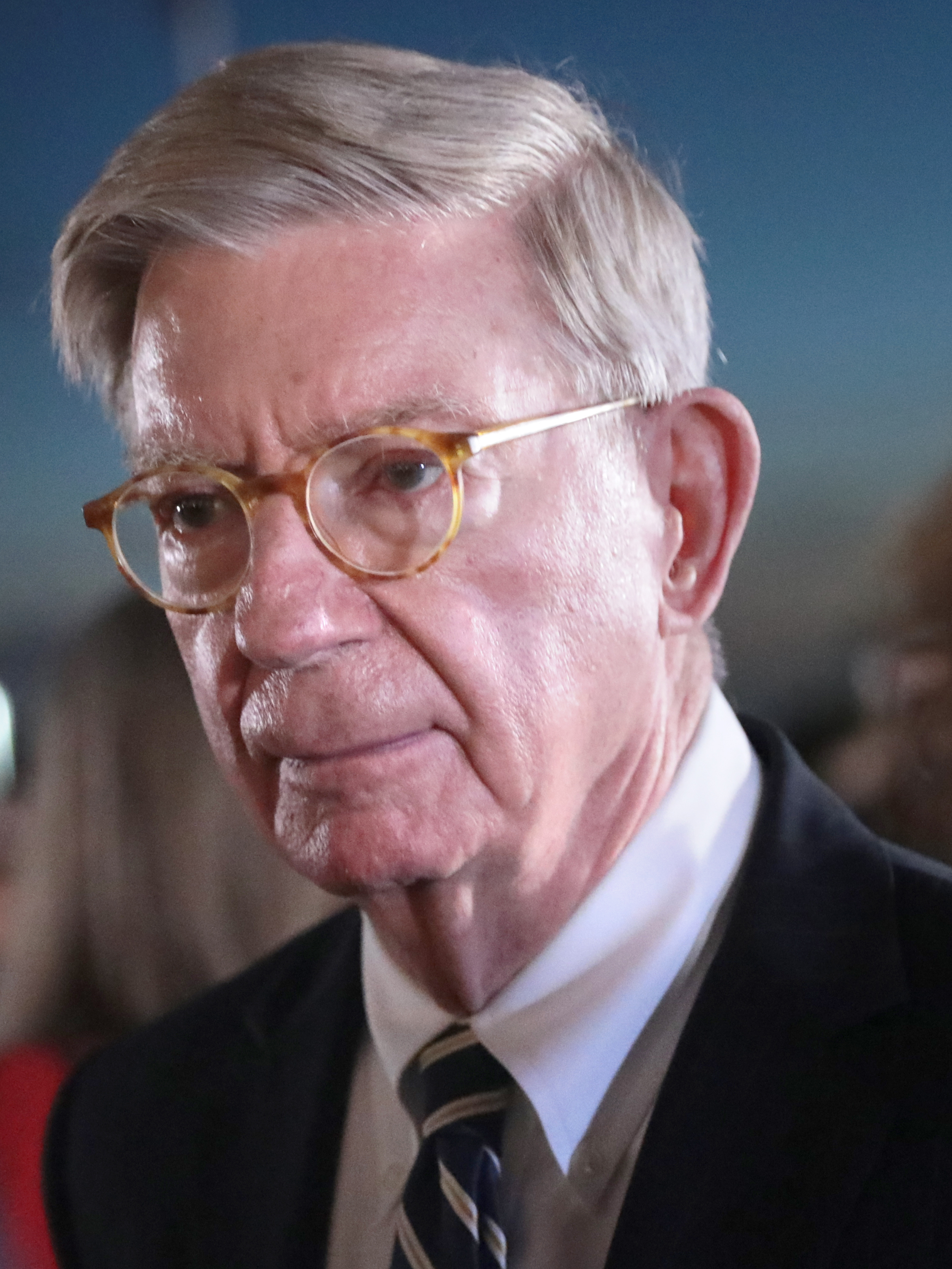
- Will in 2022
- Born: George Frederick Will; May 4, 1941 (age 85); Champaign, Illinois, U.S.
- Education: Trinity College (BA); Magdalen College, Oxford (MA); Princeton University (MA, PhD)
- Occupations: Columnist; author
- Employer(s): Newsweek; The Washington Post
- Political party: Republican (before 2016); Independent (after 2016)
- Spouses: Madeleine Will (m. 1967; div. 1989) Mari Maseng (m. 1991)
- Children: 4
- Awards: Pulitzer Prize for Commentary (1977)

George Frederick Will (born May 4, 1941) is an American libertarian conservative writer and political commentator. He writes columns for The Washington Post on a regular basis and provides commentary for NewsNation. In 1986, The Wall Street Journal called him "perhaps the most powerful journalist in America". Will won the Pulitzer Prize for Commentary in 1977.

A former member of the Republican Party, Will was a close ally of Ronald Reagan during his presidential campaign in 1980. He assisted Reagan with debate preparation and was later falsely accused by former president Jimmy Carter of providing Reagan with a top secret briefing book in a scandal known as Debategate, an allegation Carter later retracted.

In later years, he became a critic of Republican politicians, including Sarah Palin, Newt Gingrich, and Donald Trump. Will's disapproval of Trump's presidential campaign led him to become an independent in 2016, and he subsequently voted for Joe Biden in 2020 and for Kamala Harris in the 2024 election.

== Early life and education ==
Will was born on May 4, 1941, in Champaign, Illinois, to Louise (née Hendrickson) and Frederick L. Will. His father was a professor of philosophy, specializing in epistemology, at the University of Illinois at Urbana–Champaign. Will attended University Laboratory High School of Urbana, Illinois, where he graduated in 1959.

After high school, Will attended Trinity College in Hartford, Connecticut, graduating in 1962 with a Bachelor of Arts degree in religion. He then went to England and attended Magdalen College, Oxford, where he studied philosophy, politics and economics and received a bachelor's degree (promoted to a master's per tradition). Will then did doctoral study in political science at Princeton University, receiving a PhD in 1968 with a dissertation entitled "Beyond the Reach of Majorities: Closed Questions in the Open Society", alluding to a famous phrase from Justice Robert H. Jackson’s majority opinion in the landmark 1943 Supreme Court case West Virginia State Board of Education v. Barnette.

From 1970 to 1972, Will served on the staff of Republican senator Gordon Allott of Colorado. Will then taught political philosophy at the James Madison College of Michigan State University, and at the University of Toronto. He taught at Harvard University in 1995 and again in 1998.

== Journalism career ==
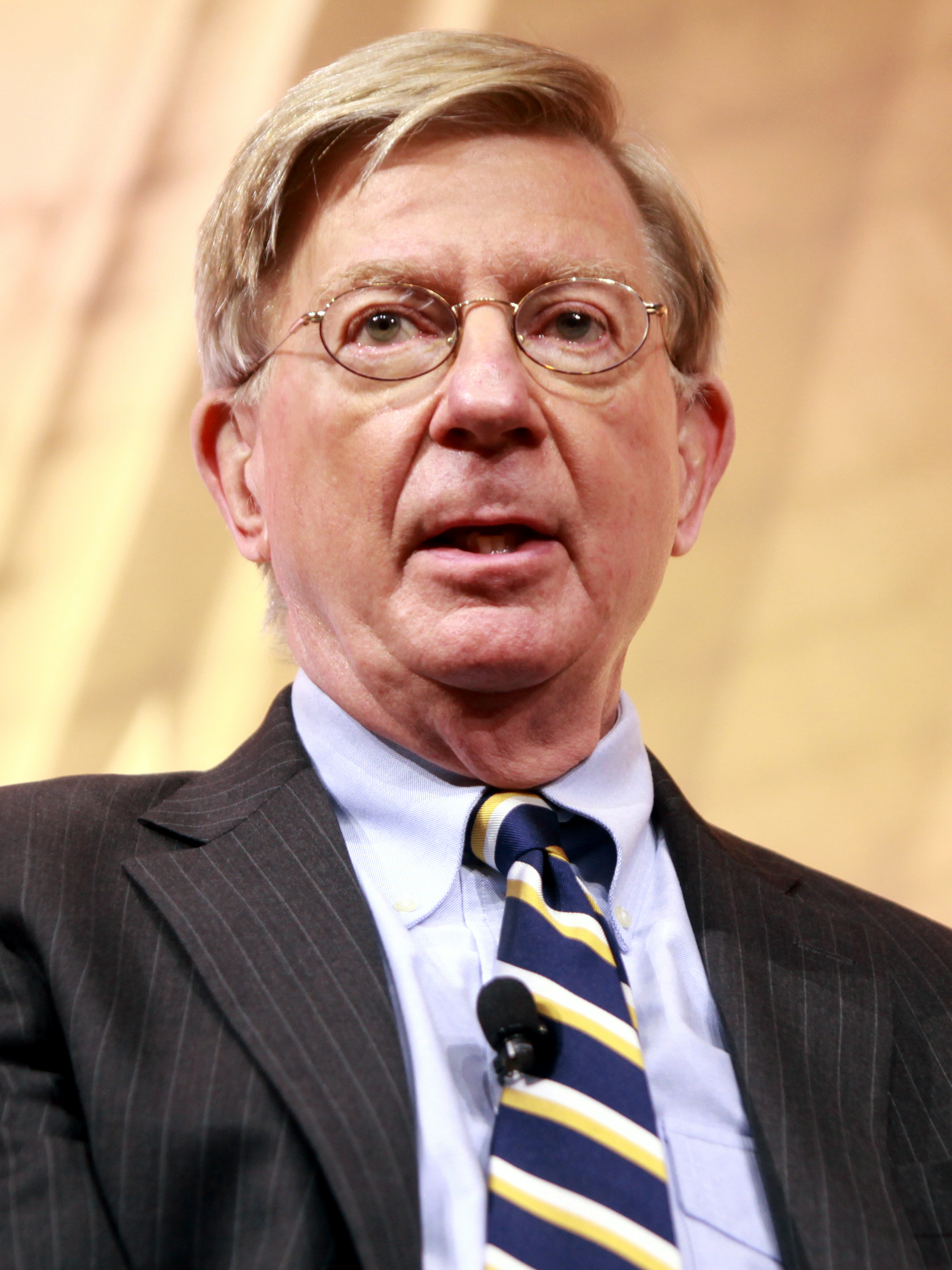
Will in 2014

Will served as an editor for National Review from 1972 to 1978. He joined The Washington Post Writers Group in 1974, writing a syndicated biweekly column, which became widely circulated among newspapers across the country and continues today. As of December 2014, his column was syndicated to about 450 newspapers. In 1976 he became a contributing editor for Newsweek, writing a biweekly backpage column until 2011.

Will won a Pulitzer Prize for Commentary for "distinguished commentary on a variety of topics" in 1977. Often combining factual reporting with conservative commentary, Will's columns are known for their erudite vocabulary, allusions to political philosophers, and frequent references to baseball. Will has also written two bestselling books on the game of baseball, three books on political philosophy, and has published eleven compilations of his columns for The Washington Post and Newsweek and of various book reviews and lectures.

From 2013 to 2017, Will was a contributor for Fox News. Prior to joining Fox News, beginning in the early 1980s, Will was a news analyst for ABC News and was a founding member on the panel of ABC's This Week with David Brinkley in 1981, now titled This Week with George Stephanopoulos. Will was a panelist on This Week until his departure from ABC News. Will was also a regular panelist on television's Agronsky & Company from 1977 through 1984. On Sunday, March 19, 2017, Meet the Press moderator Chuck Todd welcomed Will back as a panelist, stating he had been absent from the program since 1981 and that his return would mark his 52nd appearance.

On May 8, 2017, Will was announced as an MSNBC and NBC News political contributor, in which he provided regular political input on shows such as Today, Morning Joe, and The 11th Hour. On December 3, 2020, Will received the National Society for Newspaper Columnists 2020 Ernie Pyle Lifetime Achievement Award, in partnership with the Society of Professional Journalists. Since January, 2022, Will has been a senior political contributor at NewsNation.

=== 1980 Ronald Reagan presidential campaign ===
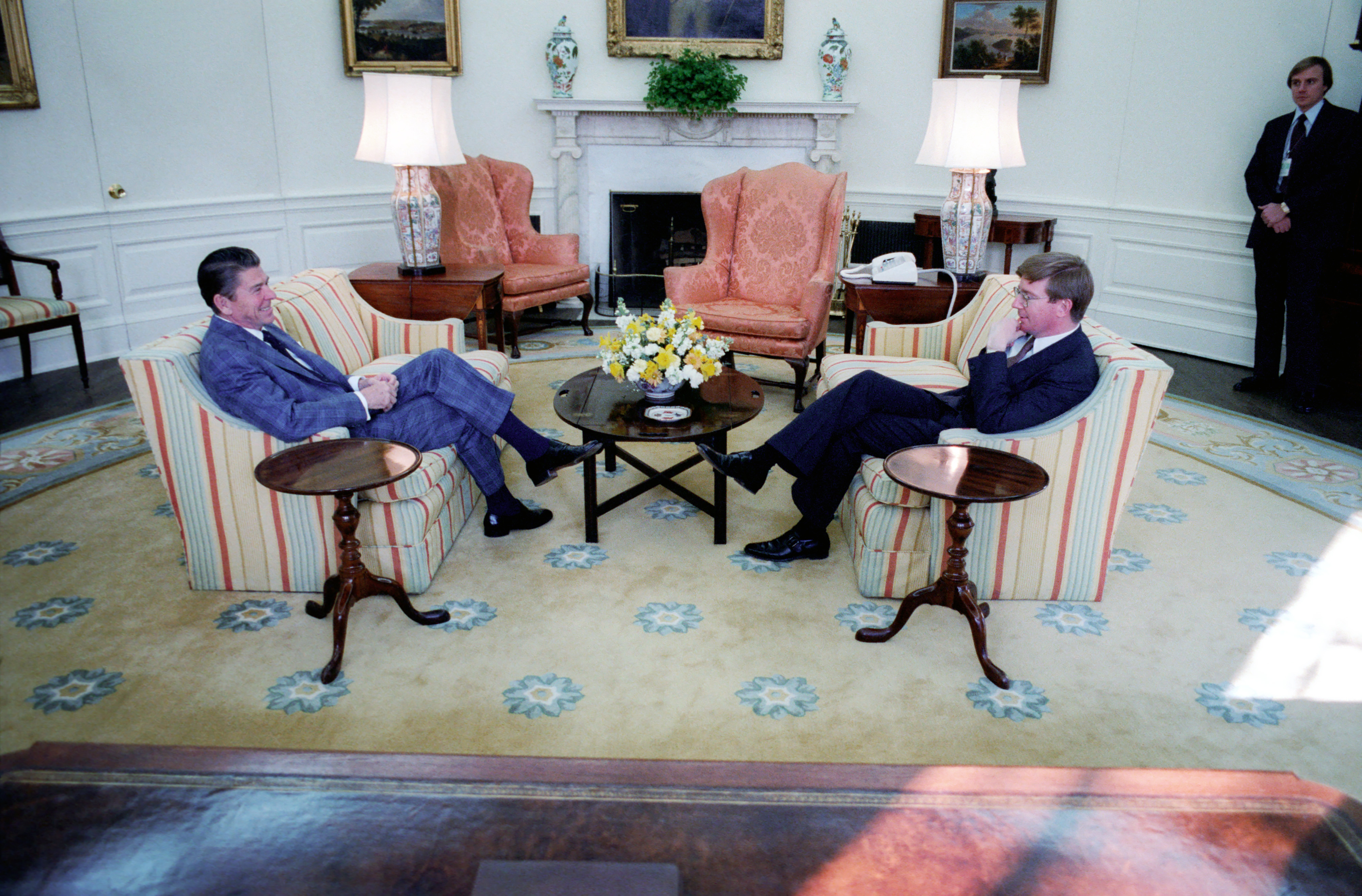
Will doing an interview with President Ronald Reagan in 1981

Will helped Ronald Reagan prepare for his 1980 debate against Jimmy Carter. Immediately after the debate, Will—not yet a member of the ABC News staff—appeared on ABC's Nightline. He was introduced by host Ted Koppel, who said: "It's my understanding that you met for some time yesterday with Governor Reagan", and that Will "never made any secret of his affection" for the Republican candidate. Will did not explicitly disclose that he had assisted Reagan's debate preparation, or been present during it. He went on to praise Reagan's "thoroughbred" performance, saying his "game plan worked well. I don't think he was very surprised."

In 2004 and again in 2005, Carter accused Will of giving the Reagan campaign a top-secret briefing book stolen from Carter's office before the 1980 debate. In a 2005 syndicated column, Will called his role in Reagan's debate preparation "inappropriate" but denied any role in stealing the briefing book. In response to Will's column, Carter wrote a letter to The Washington Post retracting his accusations. Carter apologized to Will for "any incorrect statement that I have ever made about his role in the use of my briefing book... I have never thought Mr. Will took my book, that the outcome of the debate was damaging to my campaign or that Mr. Will apologized to me."

=== 2009 global sea ice level ===
In a Washington Post column that expressed doubt over the effects of global warming, Will stated that: "According to the University of Illinois' Arctic Climate Research Center, global sea ice levels now equal those of 1979." This and several other claims attracted the attention of environmentalists, such as British author and activist George Monbiot. Asked to respond, the website of Arctic Climate Research at the University of Illinois states that: "We do not know where George Will is getting his information, but our data shows that on February 15, 1979, global sea ice area was 16.79 million sq. km and on February 15, 2009, global sea ice area was 15.45 million sq. km. Therefore, global sea ice levels are 1.34 million sq. km less in February 2009 than in February 1979." Will responded in a column that he accurately reported the center's information and the challenge was mistaken. This drew a second response from Monbiot, who insisted Will had not accurately reported the center's information. The debate continued in several forums, including a subsequent op-ed by Chris Mooney published in The Washington Post challenging Will's assertions.

=== Column regarding campus assaults ===
Will's June 6, 2014, newspaper column about "the supposed campus epidemic of rape" was met with substantial criticism on Twitter, with Democratic U.S. senators and feminists also highly critical of the article. Will wrote, "...when [colleges and universities] make victimhood a coveted status that confers privileges, victims proliferate." Will's column sparked an outcry on Twitter, with professed rape victims recounting their stories of sexual assault and violence. In The Guardian, feminist blogger Jessica Valenti wrote: "It takes a particular kind of ignorance to argue that people who come forward to report being raped in college are afforded benefits of any kind." In an open letter to Will, Senators Richard Blumenthal, Dianne Feinstein, Tammy Baldwin and Bob Casey wrote:

Your column suggests that we — including some of us who have worked on this issue for many years – all have missed a subculture on college campuses where survivors of sexual assault are inducted into a privileged class. The culture you described is so antiquated, so counter-intuitive and so contrary to anything we heard that we hope you will make an effort to hear the stories survivors bravely shared with us about the struggles they face in addressing what has happened to them — often with little meaningful assistance from authorities expected to help them.

The St. Louis Post-Dispatch dropped Will's column from its pages as a result of the column. Editor Tony Messenger wrote: "The column was offensive and inaccurate; we apologize for publishing it." Will responded to the senators in his blog, saying his article was based on "simple arithmetic involving publicly available reports", and that sexual assault "should be dealt with by the criminal justice system, and not be adjudicated by improvised campus processes."

== Political views ==
=== Foreign policy and national security ===
Will once proposed that the United States withdraw all troops from Afghanistan, and defended Barack Obama's response to the uprisings after the 2009 elections in Iran. He also criticized the Bush administration for engaging in warrantless surveillance, and supported trials for detainees at the Guantanamo Bay prison camp. On immigration, Will supports tighter border security and a "path to citizenship" for illegal immigrants.

=== Social issues ===
Will argued that the Roe v. Wade Supreme Court decision caused a "truncation of democratic debate about abortion policy". On crime, Will is opposed to the death penalty. He thinks that higher incarceration rates generally make the populace safer, but favors ending mandatory minimum sentences. Additionally, Will is generally skeptical of affirmative action programs, and he favors the legalization of drugs. He favors restoring voting rights for people with criminal records and opposes civil asset forfeiture.

=== Economic issues ===
Will is a libertarian-style conservative who supports deregulation and low taxes as he thinks these stimulate economic growth and are more morally fair. He was opposed to both George W. Bush and Barack Obama's stimulus plans. Will supports abolishing the minimum wage and creating voluntary personal retirement accounts in order to reduce the federal cost of Social Security. In February 2013, Will wrote in support of a proposal by "relentlessly liberal" Sherrod Brown to break up consolidated banks and finance industry conglomerates, ending "too big to fail" by restoring the Glass-Steagall Act.

=== Campaign finance reform ===
Will opposes attempts to regulate campaign funding, arguing that any such legislation is unconstitutional and would unfairly favor incumbent politicians. Additionally, he contends that spending money is a form of free speech and political participation. By giving the government power to regulate speech, Will believes that this will make the government "even bigger." Instead, he believes that we need "more speech, advocating less government" in order to reduce the importance of politics in our lives, thus indirectly reducing political spending.

== Criticism of Republican politicians ==
While identified with conservative politics, Will has criticized a number of individuals and policies associated with the Republican Party and American conservatism. He was among the first to oppose President George W. Bush's nomination of Harriet Miers to the United States Supreme Court in 2005, arguing she was unqualified and her nomination indicated Bush's lack of serious respect for the Supreme Court.

Will was hawkish in the run-up to the invasion of Iraq in 2003, and he expressed reservations about Bush administration Iraq policies. He eventually criticized what he said was an unrealistically optimistic set of political scenarios. In March 2006, in a column written in the aftermath of the apparently sectarian bombing of the Askariya Shrine in Samarra, Will challenged the Bush administration—and U.S. government representatives in Iraq—to be more honest about the difficulties the United States faced in rebuilding and maintaining order within Iraq, comparing the White House's rhetoric unfavorably to that of Winston Churchill during the early years of World War II. Will described the optimistic assessments delivered from the Bush administration as the "rhetoric of unreality." He criticized the Bush Iraq policy, and broader White House and congressional foreign and domestic policy making, in his keynote address for the Cato Institute's 2006 Milton Friedman Prize dinner.

Will was also a harsh and early critic of both Sarah Palin and John McCain's 2008 election campaign. He criticized Palin's understanding of the role of the Vice President and her qualifications for that role. In late 2011, as the 2012 Republican Party presidential primaries approached, Will said that frontrunner Newt Gingrich "embodies almost everything disagreeable about modern Washington", and described him as "the classic rental politician". In a 2013 interview with Reason writers Nick Gillespie and Matt Welch, Will said his views have gradually but steadily become more libertarian.

Will criticized Donald Trump several times during Trump's 2016 presidential campaign, calling him a "one-man Todd Akin", and urged conservative voters to "help him lose 50 states—condign punishment for his comprehensive disdain for conservative essentials." In turn, Trump criticized Will and brought attention to the fact that his wife Mari Maseng Will was an advisor to Scott Walker's presidential campaign. Will criticized Trump again, saying Trump was a bigger threat than Hillary Clinton. In June 2016, citing his disapproval of Trump, Will told journalist Nicholas Ballasy in an interview that he had left the Republican Party and was registered as an unaffiliated voter.

In June 2019, Will asserted the Republican Party had become a cult. Will supported Joe Biden in the 2020 U.S. presidential election, and Kamala Harris in the 2024 United States presidential election.

== Personal life ==
Will has three children—Victoria, Geoffrey and Jonathan—with his first wife, Madeleine; their eldest child, Jonathan, was born in 1972 with Down syndrome, which Will has written about in his column on occasion. In 1989, he and Madeleine divorced after 22 years of marriage.

In 1991, Will married Mari Maseng. They have one child, a son named David, born in 1992 and live in Chevy Chase, Maryland. Maseng is a political consultant and speechwriter who was in charge of communications for the Rick Perry 2012 presidential campaign and worked on Scott Walker's 2016 presidential campaign. She earlier worked on Michele Bachmann's 2012 presidential campaign, and offered her services to the Mitt Romney 2012 campaign. She previously worked for Ronald Reagan as a presidential speechwriter, deputy director of transportation and Assistant to the President for Public Liaison. She also was a former communications director for Senator Bob Dole.

Will has more than once described himself as an "amiable, low-voltage atheist", while at the same time describing his wife, Mari Maseng, as a "fierce Presbyterian".

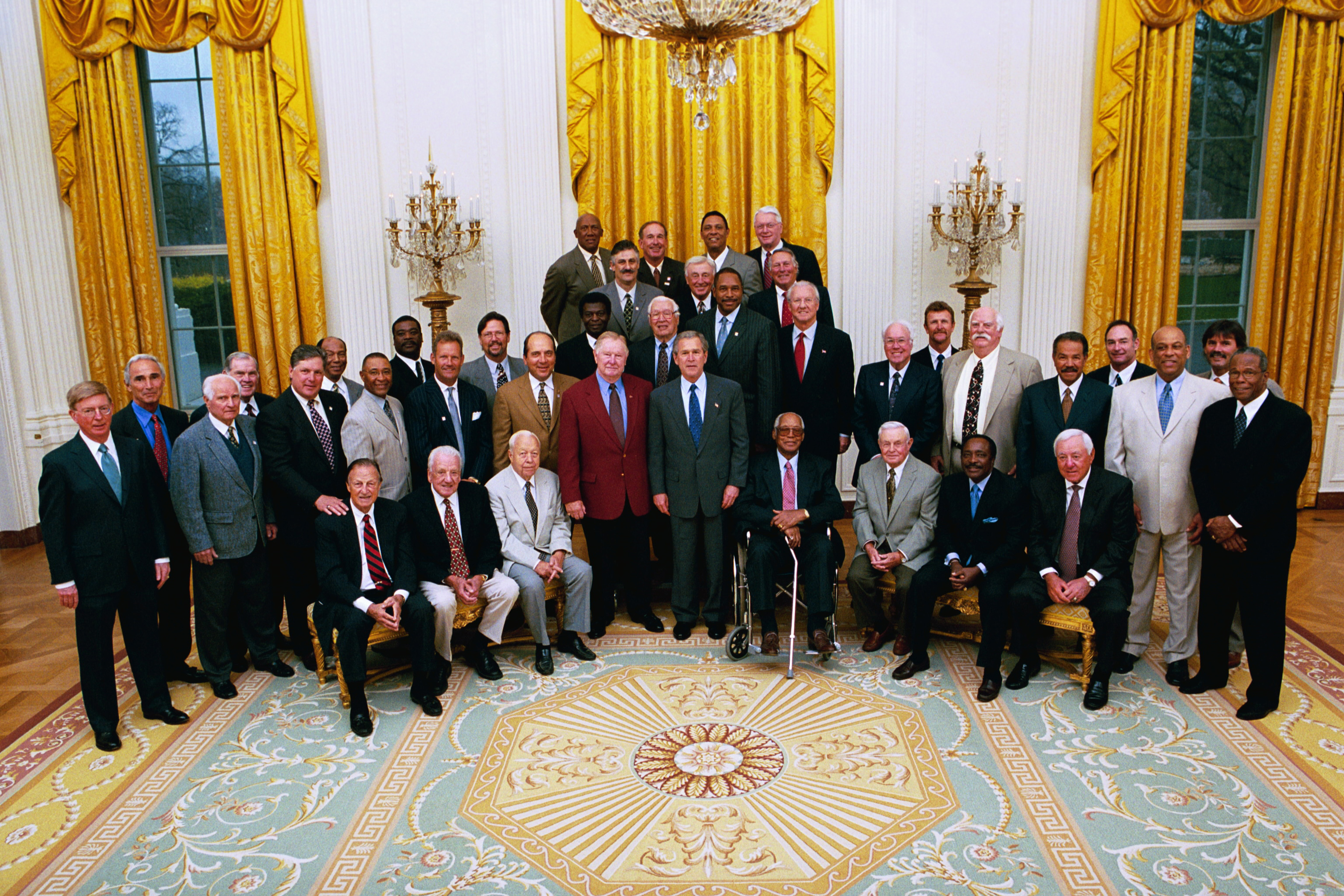
Will (at far left) with members of the Baseball Hall of Fame and George W. Bush at the White House in 2004

Will, a fan of both the Chicago Cubs and the Washington Nationals, has written extensively on baseball, including his best-selling book Men at Work: The Craft of Baseball. He was one of the many interview subjects for Ken Burns's PBS documentary series Baseball.

== References in popular culture ==
Will was occasionally lampooned in the comic Doonesbury, particularly in a December 1980 sequence of strips in which several characters attend a party hosted by Will for the Reagans.

Will was lampooned in a skit on an April 1990 episode of the sketch comedy show Saturday Night Live. Dana Carvey played Will as the host of the fictional baseball trivia game show George F. Will's Sports Machine, in which the answers are all highflown literary metaphors that leave the contestants befuddled; the exasperated contestants finally get Will to try to throw a baseball, which he is unable to do.

In the Seinfeld season 6 episode "The Jimmy", Kramer mentions that he finds George Will attractive. In the 30 Rock season 1 episode "Jack-Tor", Tracy Jordan remarks while reading a newspaper that George Will "just gets more and more conservative."

== Honorary awards and recognition ==
In addition to more than 16 honorary degrees:

- 1977: Pulitzer Prize for Commentary
- 1978: Headliner Award for consistently outstanding feature columns
- 1979: Finalist for National Magazine Award in essays and criticism
- 1980: Silurian Award for editorial writing
- 1991: Silurian Award for editorial writing
- 1991: First Place in Interpretive Columns: Clarion Awards from Women in Communications
- 1991: Walter Cronkite Award for Excellence in Journalism., Arizona State University
- 1992: Madison Medal Award, Princeton University
- 1993: Honoris Causa initiate of Omicron Delta Kappa at Washington and Lee University
- 1993: William Allen White Award, William Allen White School of Journalism at the University of Kansas
- 2003: Walter B. Wriston Lecture Award, The Manhattan Institute
- 2005: Bradley Prize, The Bradley Foundation
- 2006: Champion of Liberty Award, Goldwater Institute
- On May 18, 2019, The Lincoln Academy of Illinois granted Will the Order of Lincoln award, the highest honor bestowed by the State of Illinois.

== Works ==
- The Pursuit of Happiness, and Other Sobering Thoughts. Harper & Row. 1978. ISBN 9780060146634.
- The Pursuit of Virtue and Other Tory Notions. Touchstone. 1983. ISBN 9780671457129.
- Statecraft as Soulcraft: What Government Does. Simon & Schuster. 1983. ISBN 9780671427337.
- Will, George (1984). "New Business Initiatives for Public Policy". In Aronoff, Craig E.; Ward, John L. (eds.). The Future of Private Enterprise. Vol. 1. The Association of Private Enterprise Education. pp. 169–180. ISBN 0884061647.
- The Morning After: American Successes and Excesses -- 1981-1986. Free Press. 1986. ISBN 9785551804116.
- The New Season: A Spectator's Guide to the 1988 Election. Simon & Schuster. 1987. ISBN 9780671662752.
- Men at Work: The Craft of Baseball. Macmillan. 1990. ISBN 9780026284707.
- Suddenly: The American Idea Abroad and at Home, 1986-1990. Free Press. 1990. ISBN 9780029344354.
- Restoration: Congress, Term Limits, and the Recovery of Deliberative Democracy. Free Press. 1992. ISBN 9780029344378.
- The Leveling Wind: Politics, the Culture, and Other News, 1990-1994. Free Press. 1994. ISBN 9780029344385.
- The Woven Figure: Conservatism and America's Fabric. Scribner. 1999. ISBN 9780684864587.
- Bunts: Curt Flood, Camden Yards, Pete Rose, and Other Reflections on Baseball. Scribner. 1998. ISBN 9780684838205.
- With a Happy Eye But... America and the World, 1997-2002. Free Press. 2002. ISBN 9780684838212.
- One Man's America: The Pleasures and Provocations of Our Singular Nation. Crown Forum. 2008. ISBN 9780307407863.
- A Nice Little Place on the North Side: Wrigley Field at One Hundred. Crown Archetype. 2014. ISBN 9780385349314.
- The Conservative Sensibility. Hachette Books. 2019. ISBN 9780316480932.
- American Happiness and Discontents: The Unruly Torrent, 2008-2020. Hachette Books. 2021. ISBN 9780306924415.
