= Craig Shirley =

American political consultant and author

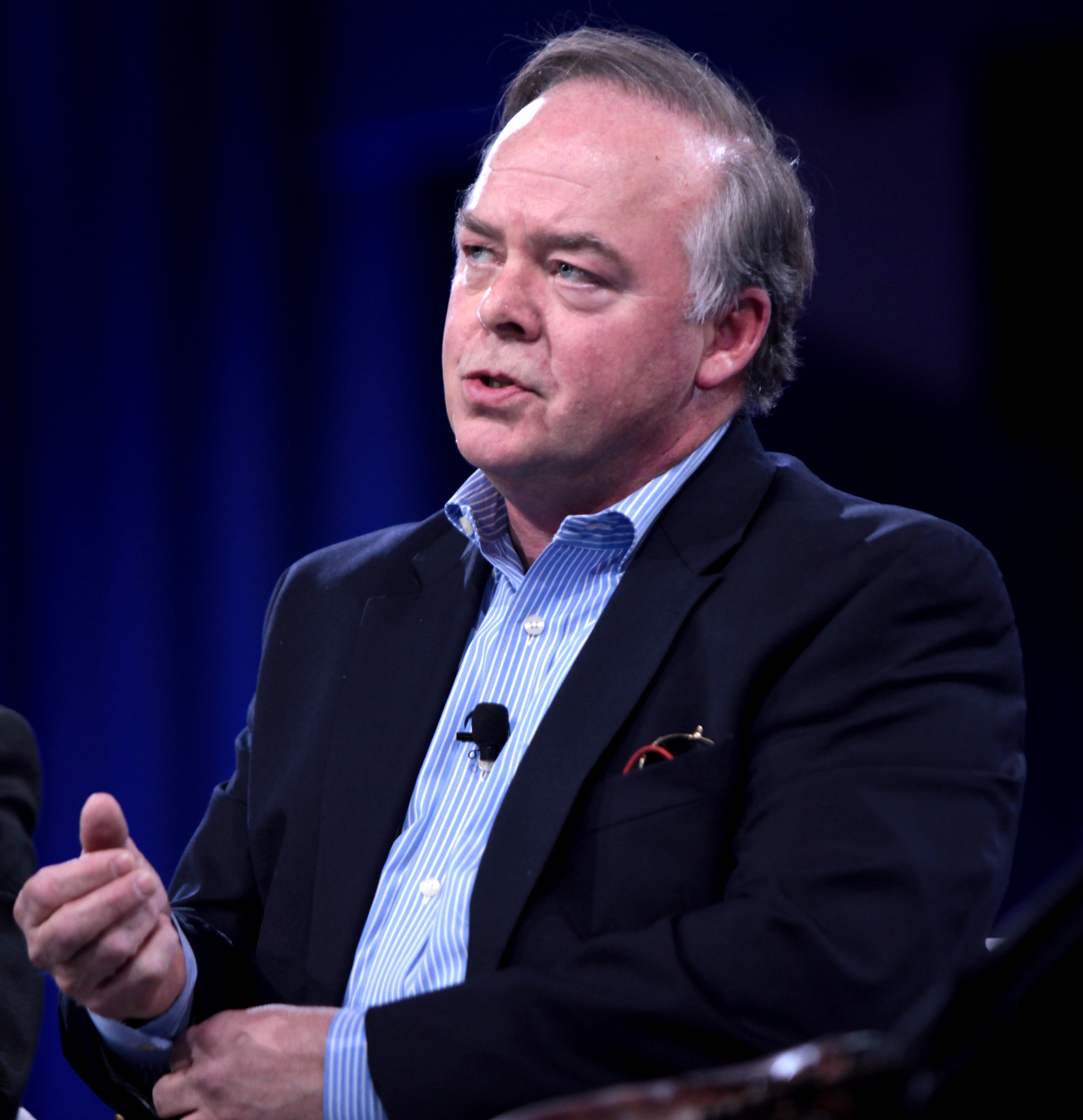
- Shirley in 2016
- Born: Craigan Paul Shirley; September 24, 1956 (age 70); Syracuse, New York, U.S.
- Education: Springfield College
- Occupations: Author, political consultant
- Spouse: Zorine Shirley
- Children: 4
- Website: www.shirleyandmcvicker.com

Craigan Paul Shirley (born September 24, 1956) is an American political consultant, lobbyist and author.

== Early life and education ==
Shirley is the second son of Edward Bruce Shirley and Barbara Cone Shirley. His father was a founding member of the New York State Conservative Party. As an eight-year-old, he accompanied his parents as they campaigned door to door in 1964, stumping for presidential candidate Barry Goldwater. In 1978, Shirley graduated from Springfield College in Springfield, Massachusetts, where he majored in history and political science.

== Career ==
In the 1970s, he worked for Senator Jacob Javits of New York, the John N. Dalton gubernatorial campaign in Virginia, and Senator Gordon Humphrey of New Hampshire. Shirley first met Ronald Reagan when Reagan campaigned for Humphrey in New Hampshire.

In 1980, he ran an important independent expenditure campaign in support of former California governor Ronald Reagan’s presidential bid in the first six primary states, on behalf of the Fund for a Conservative Majority. Shirley produced and placed radio and newspaper ads in New Hampshire, South Carolina, Florida and three other states, maximizing the three quarters of a million dollars that FCM budgeted for the campaign to help Reagan at a time when the campaign was broke.

He joined the staff of the Republican National Committee in 1982. During the 1984 presidential campaign, Shirley was communications director for the National Conservative Political Action Committee. After Reagan’s reelection, in the late fall of 1984, Shirley opened his own firm and worked on numerous matters in co-ordination with the Reagan White House including aid to the Nicaraguan Contras, support for the Strategic Defensive Initiative, support for the Afghanistan Mujaheddin, support for Jonas Savimbi’s UNITA, and support for the Tax Reform Act of 1986. He also worked on the White House Conference on Small Business in 1985.; and lobbying on behalf of The Heritage Foundation for weapons shipments, via apartheid South Africa, to perpetuate Jonas Savimbi's 20-year insurgency against Angola. He also supported Reagan's Tax Reform Act of 1986, which reduced the top marginal tax rate from 50 percent to 28 percent, and participated in the 1985 White House Conference on Small Business.

In 1991, Shirley ran a major advertising and public affairs campaign supporting President Bush and Operation Desert Storm, later he represented the Embassy of the State of Kuwait, and was placed in charge of public relations for an international conference on democracy hosted in Prague by President Václav Havel of then Czechoslovakia. For a short time, Shirley and David Keene partnered in a firm, but that association ended amicably in 1992.

During the 1990s, Shirley conceived and created Citizens for State Power, which represented small investor-owned utilities, and they successfully stopped the attempts by Enron to nationalize the electricity grid. Shirley also advised the Southeastern Legal Foundation to file suit against the Clinton Administration’s attempt to politicize the census. The case went to the Supreme Court and there the SLF prevailed, defeating Clinton in an historic 5–4 vote. Shirley pioneered the "New Media"—and indeed coined the very phrase—of talk radio, faxes, e-mail and later the internet to mobilize for politics and policy. He has also coined the term "Vichy Republicans" and "Police State Republicans." In 2000, Craig Shirley & Associates became Shirley & Banister Public Affairs. In 2019, it became Shirley & McVicker Public Affairs. Shirley is acting chair of the right-wing political action committee Citizens for the Republic.

Shirley is a former member of the Board of Governors of the Reagan Ranch and has lectured at the Reagan Library. He taught a seminar on Reagan at Eureka College, in 2012.

=== Books ===
- 2005: Reagan's Revolution: The Untold Story of the Campaign That Started It All (Thomas Nelson)
- 2009: Rendezvous with Destiny: Ronald Reagan and the Campaign That Changed America (Intercollegiate Studies Institute)
- 2011: December 1941: 31 Days That Changed America and Saved the World (Thomas Nelson)
- 2015: Last Act: The Final Years and Emerging Legacy of Ronald Reagan (Thomas Nelson)
- 2017: Reagan Rising: The Decisive Years, 1976-1980 (HarperCollins)
- 2017: Citizen Newt: The Making of a Reagan Conservative (Thomas Nelson)
- 2019: Mary Ball Washington: The Untold Story of George Washington's Mother (Harper Collins)
- 2022: April 1945: The Hinge of History (Thomas Nelson)

His book December 1941: 31 Days That Changed America and Saved the World (2011) was a New York Times bestseller. His book, Last Act, was named best non-fiction narrative by USA Book News for 2015, while Rendezvous with Destiny was named one of the five best campaign books by the Wall Street Journal.

== Personal life ==
Shirley is the founder of the Fort Hunt Youth Lacrosse Program and coached there for 14 years. His wife, Zorine Shirley, is a vice-president of the Essex Country Museum and Historical Society.
