= Lyn Nofziger =

American journalist, political consultant and writer

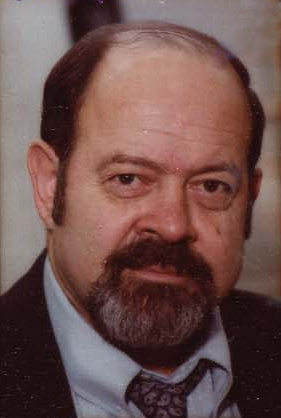
- Nofziger in 1981

White House Director of Political Affairs
- In office January 20, 1981 – January 22, 1982
- President: Ronald Reagan
- Preceded by: Sarah Weddington
- Succeeded by: Ed Rollins

Personal details
- Born: Franklyn Curran Nofziger; June 8, 1924 Bakersfield, California, U.S.
- Died: March 27, 2006 (aged 81) Falls Church, Virginia, U.S.
- Resting place: National Memorial Park
- Party: Republican
- Education: San Jose State University (BA)

Military service
- Allegiance: United States
- Branch/service: United States Army

Franklyn Curran "Lyn" Nofziger (June 8, 1924 – March 27, 2006) was an American journalist, conservative Republican political consultant and author. He served as press secretary in Ronald Reagan's administration as Governor of California, and as a White House advisor during the Richard Nixon administration and again during the Reagan presidency.

== Early years ==
Nofziger was born in Bakersfield, California. Politically conservative by the time he attended high school, he worked on the school newspaper.

In the early 1940s, he accused one of his teachers at Canoga Park High School, Blanche Bettington, of being "communistic" because she warned her students against "reactionary" publications. Bettington and another teacher were cleared in 1946 after an inquiry by the Los Angeles Board of Education. The Board's conclusion stated, "While this inquiry has raised serious questions as to certain classroom practices engaged in by these teachers, it has also produced evidence of many outstanding accomplishments by them".

Nofziger served in the United States Army and then earned a Bachelor of Arts degree in journalism from San Jose State College in San Jose, California.

== Career ==
After earning his degree, he worked for sixteen years as a reporter, editor and Washington, D.C., correspondent for Copley Newspapers and Copley News Service.

In 1966, Nofziger was named press secretary for Ronald Reagan's successful California gubernatorial campaign and served two years as Reagan's Director of Communications.

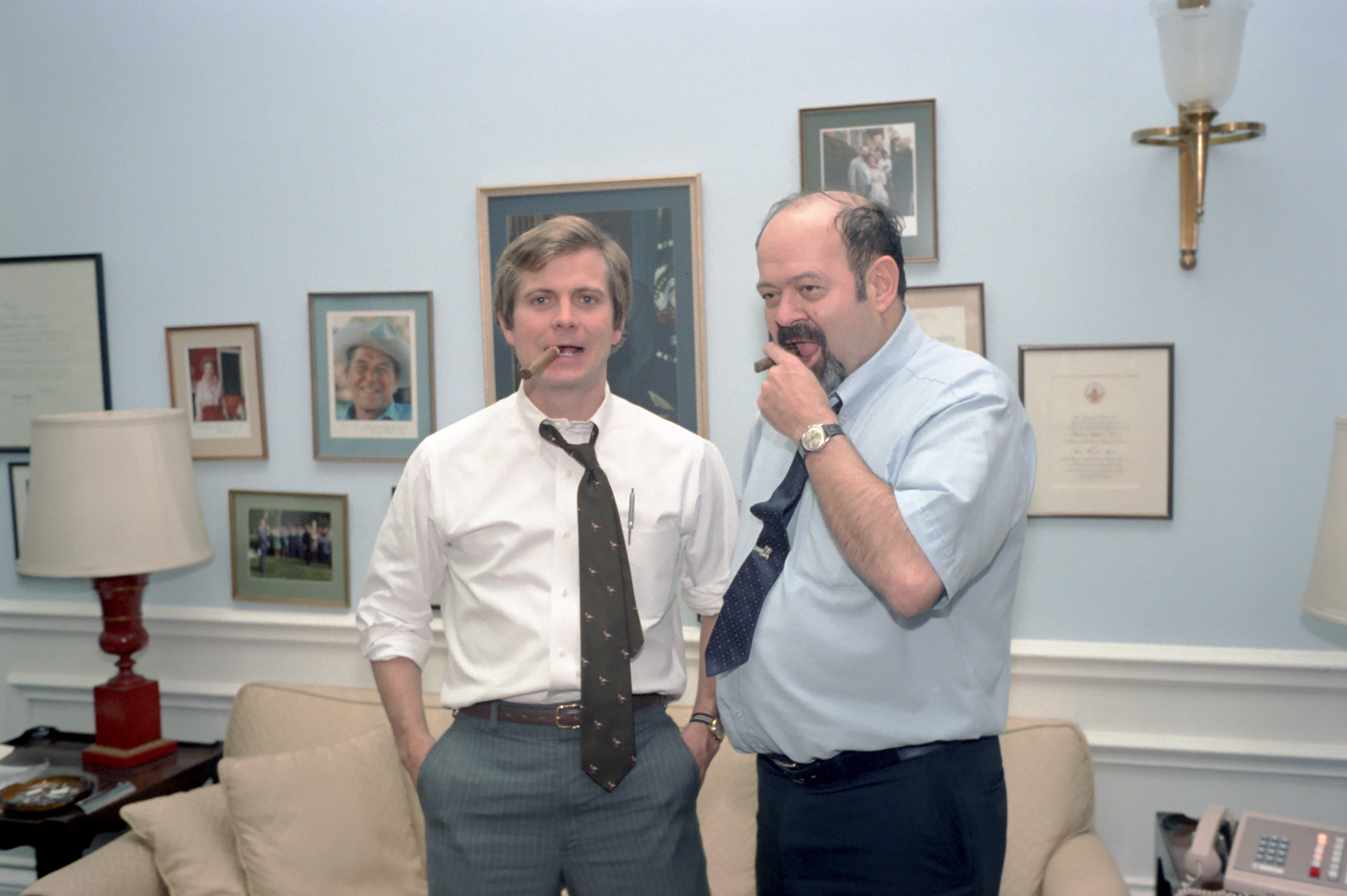
Nofziger with Lee Atwater in 1982

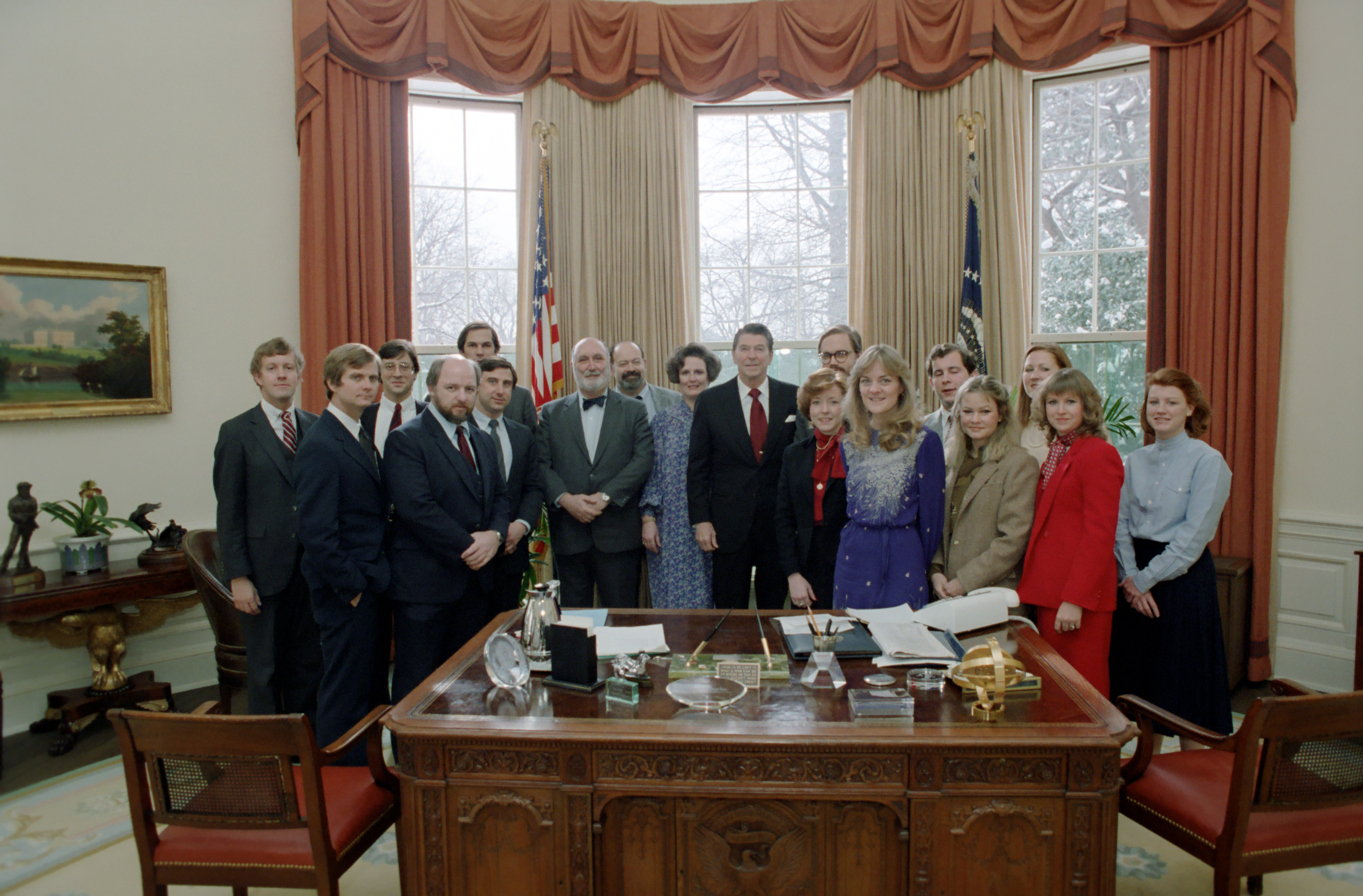
President Ronald Reagan farewell photo opportunity with Nofziger and members of his staff including Lee Atwater and Ed Rollins in the Oval Office in 1982

After Richard Nixon's election as President of the United States in 1968, Nofziger served in the Nixon White House as Deputy Assistant to the President for Congressional Relations and the Republican National Committee as its Deputy Chairman for Communications. Nofziger worked for Nixon's presidential re-election campaign in 1972 as executive director of the California Committee for the Re-Election of the President. John Dean, Nixon's White House counsel, wrote that Nofziger had helped compile the Nixon White House's enemies list.

As Reagan set his sights on the Republican presidential nomination in 1976, Nofziger served his campaign as Press Secretary, Convention Director, and Director of the California campaign. When Gerald Ford won the Republican nomination, Nofziger assisted with the Ford-Dole campaign, which lost the election to Democrat Jimmy Carter.

Nofziger went back to work for Reagan as he began laying the groundwork for the 1980 campaign, serving as executive vice-chairman of Citizens for the Republic, a political action committee founded by Reagan. With the run for the White House in full gear in 1979, Nofziger served as deputy chairman for finance for the Reagan for President organization. Reagan won the election, defeating Carter's bid for a second term.

Nofziger never sought to be Press Secretary in the White House, it being in his words "a young man's job". James Brady was named Press Secretary. Nofziger was instead named to the post of Assistant to the President for Political Affairs, and was employed in that position for about a year. Nofziger was a senior consultant for the 1984 Reagan-Bush Re-Election Campaign and a member of the 1985 Inaugural Committee.

Nofziger also ran political campaigns for Pat Buchanan and Steve Forbes.

=== Wedtech scandal ===
In 1987, Nofziger was investigated for allegedly violating the Ethics in Government Act when he lobbied on behalf of Wedtech Corporation, a defense contractor. Under this law, former government officials could not lobby their former office for a period of two years. Nofziger knew this, and for two years he did not lobby the Office of Political Affairs at the White House. Federal prosecutors said the law made it illegal for Nofziger to contact any office at the White House. Nofziger was indicted and later convicted of violating the law. Nofziger vigorously fought the indictment and conviction, which was eventually overturned on appeal. The government pressed its case to the United States Supreme Court, which refused to reinstate the conviction.

=== Opposition to metric system ===
Nofziger and Frank Mankiewicz were major players in halting the 1970s metrication effort in the United States, largely by convincing President Ronald Reagan to shut down the United States Metric Board.

== Memoir ==
Nofziger's political memoir, titled Nofziger, was published in October 1992 by Regnery Publishing. He wrote four Western novels with a hero named Tackett, a drifter who falls into situations that compel him to rescue women in distress. The Tackett series was an homage to Nofziger's friend, Louis L'Amour, author of The Sacketts and scores of other Westerns.

== Death ==
Nofziger died on March 27, 2006, at his home in Falls Church, Virginia, from kidney cancer, aged 81. His body was interred in National Memorial Park in Falls Church.

== Works ==
=== Autobiography ===
- Nofziger; Lyn Nofziger; Regnery Publishing (September 1992); ISBN 0-89526-513-3

=== Other works ===
- The Tacketts; Lyn Nofziger; Jameson Books (May 2004); ISBN 0-915463-85-7
- Unbridled Joy: The Verse of Joy Skilmer; Lyn Nofziger; MND Books (April 10, 2000); ISBN 0-940847-13-2

Political offices
Preceded by Sarah Weddington	White House Director of Political Affairs; 1981–1982	Succeeded by Ed Rollins
