= The Reagans =

- DVD cover
- Based on: First Ladies Volume II by Carl Sferrazza Anthony
- Written by: Jane Marchwood; Tom Rickman; Elizabeth Egloff
- Directed by: Robert Allan Ackerman
- Starring: James Brolin; Judy Davis; Željko Ivanek; Mary Beth Peil; Bill Smitrovich; Shad Hart; Zoie Palmer; Richard Fitzpatrick; Vlasta Vrána; Francis Xavier McCarthy; Frank Moore; Aidan Devine; John Stamos
- Music by: John Altman
- Country of origin: United States
- Original language: English

Production
- Executive producers: Craig Zadan; Neil Meron
- Producer: Lynn Raynor
- Cinematography: James Chressanthis
- Editors: Melissa Kent; Mike Brown
- Running time: 180 minutes
- Production companies: Storyline Entertainment; Sony Pictures Television

Original release
- Network: Showtime
- Release: November 30, 2003

The Reagans is a 2003 American biographical drama television film about U.S. President Ronald Reagan and his family. It was directed by Robert Allan Ackerman and written by Jane Marchwood, Tom Rickman, and Elizabeth Egloff, based on the 1991 biography First Ladies Volume II by Carl Sferrazza Anthony. The film was produced by Storyline Entertainment and Sony Pictures Television. It stars James Brolin as Reagan and Judy Davis as First Lady Nancy Reagan. The supporting cast includes Željko Ivanek, Mary Beth Peil, Bill Smitrovich, Shad Hart, Zoie Palmer, Richard Fitzpatrick, Vlasta Vrána, Francis Xavier McCarthy, Frank Moore, Aidan Devine, and John Stamos.

The network CBS had planned to broadcast it as a 2-part miniseries in November 2003 during fall "sweeps", but it was ultimately broadcast as a film on November 30 of that year on cable channel Showtime due to controversy over its portrayal of Reagan.

== Plot ==
The film covers the period in time from 1949, when Reagan was still in Hollywood, through his governorship of California until his last day in office as President in 1989.

In 1968, Reagan loses the Republican nomination to Richard Nixon. At the end of his 8 years of service as the California governor in 1975, Reagan vies for the Republican party nomination in 1976. Then-President Gerald Ford wins the nomination.

Patti Davis, one of the daughters of Ronald Reagan, is portrayed as a drug addict.

The film portrays the assassination attempt on Reagan in 1981 as well as the Gulf of Sidra incident later that year.

== Cast ==
- James Brolin – Ronald Reagan
- Judy Davis – Nancy Reagan
- Željko Ivanek – Michael Deaver, Deputy White House Chief of Staff, 1981–1985
- Mary Beth Peil – Edith Davis, Nancy's mother
- Bill Smitrovich – Alexander Haig, Secretary of State, 1981–1982
- Shad Hart – Ron Reagan, son
- Zoie Palmer – Patti Davis, daughter
- Richard Fitzpatrick – Ben Weldon
- Vlasta Vrána – Edwin Meese, Counselor to the President, member of the National Security Council 1981–1985, and United States Attorney General 1985–1988
- Francis Xavier McCarthy – Dr. Loyal Davis
- Frank Moore – Don Regan, Secretary of the Treasury 1981–1985 and White House Chief of Staff 1985–1987
- Aidan Devine – Bill Shelby
- John Stamos – John Sears, Deputy counsel to Richard Nixon and campaign manager for Reagan in 76 bid and briefly in his successful 80 campaign
- Stewart Bick – Lew Wasserman, Hollywood agent and Democratic Party fundraiser who was a lifelong mentor/friend to Ronald Reagan
- Tom Barnett/Tod Fennell – Michael Reagan, adopted son of Ronald Reagan
- Laura Press – Betsy Bloomingdale, well known socialite and close friend of Nancy's
- Dan Lett – Robert H. Tuttle, assistant and director of Presidential Personnel
- Carolyn Dunn – Maureen Reagan, daughter from Jane Wyman
- Victor A. Young – Alfred S. Bloomingdale, close friend and member of President's Foreign Intelligence Advisory Board
- Don Allison – James Baker, White House Chief of Staff 1981–1985, Secretary of the Treasury 1985–1988
- John Bourgeois – John Tower, U.S. Senator from Texas and led the Tower Commission investigating the Iran–Contra affair
- Rodger Barton – Robert McFarlane, National Security Advisor 1983–1985
- Ian D. Clark — Dr. John E. Hutton Jr., White House Physician
- Frank Fontaine – William J. Casey, Director of Central Intelligence 1981–1987
- George R. Robertson – Barry Goldwater, Republican U.S. Senator from Arizona and key figure in Reagan's rise in the Republican Party
- John Koensgen – Mervyn LeRoy, Hollywood director/producer who set Ron and Nancy up
- John Robinson – Jerry Parr, Secret Service agent who pushed Reagan in car during assassination attempt
- Sean McCann – George P. Shultz, Secretary of State 1982–1989
- Tom Rack – Elie Wiesel, Jewish writer, Holocaust survivor, professor who was critical of Reagan's visit to Bitburg, Germany to visit a cemetery in which some SS soldiers were buried
- Al Goulem – Oliver North, Decorated U.S. Marine who was on the National Security Council and, although controversial, widely believed to be a scapegoat in the Iran–Contra affair
- Suzanna Lenir – Colleen Sterns Reagan, daughter-in-law and wife of Michael Reagan
- Claudia Besso – Doria Reagan, daughter-in-law and wife of Ron Reagan
- Lubomir Mykytiuk – Mikhail Gorbachev, General Secretary of the Soviet Union
- Tatiana Chouljenko – Raisa Gorbachyova, wife of Mikhail Gorbachev
- Susan Glover – Helene von Damm, assistant of Presidential Personnel and United States Ambassador to Austria
- Daniel Pilon – Donn Moomaw, friend, pastor of Reagan who gave the invocation at the 1981 Inaugural
- Christopher Dyson – Bernie Leadon, one time Patti boyfriend and founding member of the band The Eagles
- Lisa Bronwyn Moore – Kathy Reynolds
- John Andersen – Jimmy Carter, 39th President
- Sarah Carlsen – Sarah Brady, lobbyist on gun control/wife of James Brady who was disabled after being shot during Reagan assassination attempt
- Brett Watson – Paul Grilley, son in-law and husband from 1984–1990 of Patti Davis Reagan
- Peter Colvey – Gerald Ford, 38th President
- Alan Fawcett – Larry Speakes, assistant and White House Press Secretary
- Jerome Tiberghien – William F. Buckley, famous conservative commentator and personal friend of Reagan
- Bibi Burton – Christina Taylor based on Joan Quigley, Nancy Reagan's astrologer
- Marjorie Silcoff – Joan Didion, journalist, essayist, novelist who wrote articles for several papers including Buckley's National Review
- Kevin Woodhouse (uncredited) – John Hinckley Jr., attempted to assassinate Ronald Reagan

== Controversy ==
About a month before it was scheduled to air, portions of the script were leaked. As a result of these stories, the miniseries began to be widely criticized by conservatives as an unbalanced and inaccurate depiction of Reagan. CBS reportedly had ordered a love story about Ronald and Nancy Reagan with politics as a backdrop, but instead received what they later claimed was an overtly political film. Supporters of the film claimed that these criticisms were simply partisan bias and were an attempt to censor a film because it did not always portray the former president in a positive light.

Conservatives began criticizing the miniseries before it was broadcast and claimed that it put words in Reagan's mouth and condemned it as leftist historical revisionism. Much of the criticism was based upon early drafts of the script and featured scenes that were never shot or were cut from the final version. Eventually, after several weeks of outspoken criticism by conservatives, on November 4, 2003, CBS withdrew the miniseries from the broadcast schedule and announced that the program did "not present a balanced portrayal of the Reagans." The network chose instead to broadcast the miniseries on the cable channel Showtime, which along with CBS was owned by Viacom. In a statement on its web site, CBS said:

CBS will not broadcast The Reagans on November 16 and 18. This decision is based solely on our reaction to seeing the final film, not the controversy that erupted around a draft of the script.

Although the mini-series features impressive production values and acting performances, and although the producers have sources to verify each scene in the script, we believe it does not present a balanced portrayal of the Reagans for CBS and its audience. Subsequent edits that we considered did not address those concerns.

A free broadcast network, available to all over the public airwaves, has different standards than media that the public must pay to view. We do, however, recognize and respect the filmmakers' right to have their voice heard and their film seen.

CBS's denial that it was yielding to the furor did not persuade its critics. The producers of the movie noted that, before the outcry, CBS had approved both the script for the miniseries and had seen dailies as they were shot, and the film had been approved by two sets of lawyers. Jeff Chester, head of the Center for Digital Democracy, a communications lobbying group, said that CBS had chosen not to offend Republicans at a time when the federal government was considering rules restricting ownership of local television stations. CBS executives "made a business decision," he said. "In doing so, they clearly caved in to the political pressure." Senator Tom Daschle, the Democratic leader of the time, commented that the decision "smells of intimidation to me."

Reagan's daughter Patti Davis criticized the portrayal of her parents. She accused the show's producers of "astounding carelessness and cruelty" and said the script was "quite simply, idiotic." She said that her father was caricatured as a "demented evangelist", while her mother Nancy was made out to be "a female Attila the Hun." "To deliberately and calculatingly depict public people as shallow, intolerant, cold, and inept, with no truths or facts to back up the portrayals, is nothing short of malevolent." "And my father, obviously, cannot correct the lies told about him."

=== A controversial line excised ===
One of the most controversial points in the script was the depiction of Reagan telling his wife during a conversation about AIDS patients, "They that live in sin shall die in sin." Co-writer Elizabeth Egloff acknowledged that there was no evidence that Reagan ever said this.

This line was dropped in the Showtime and DVD versions of the film. The Reagans producers, Neil Meron and Craig Zadan, have insisted that every fact (but not every line of dialogue) was supported by at least two sources. However, according to Reagan's daughter Patti Davis, no family member or close friend of the Reagans was consulted by the filmmakers throughout the production.

Another factor which has motivated certain critics to claim bias was that Reagan was played by James Brolin, whose wife Barbra Streisand is an outspoken liberal.

Barbra Streisand criticized CBS's decision not to screen The Reagans as a "sad day for artistic freedom" and said the network "caved in to right-wing Republican pressure". Patti Davis commented that CBS did the "right thing" in pulling it from schedules.

Brolin would later play Governor Rob Ritchie, a fictional Republican candidate for the Presidency in The West Wing, while his son Josh would play the 43rd President George W. Bush in the 2008 Oliver Stone film W.
