= List of presidential trips made by Ronald Reagan (1984) =

This is a list of presidential trips made by Ronald Reagan during 1984, the fourth year of his presidency as the 40th president of the United States. International trips are highlighted in blue.

This list excludes trips made within Washington, D.C., the U.S. federal capital in which the White House, the official residence and principal workplace of the president, is located. It also excludes the capital's immediate surroundings in Maryland and Virginia, such as Andrews Air Force Base in Maryland, where the president typically boards Air Force One for all trips outside the area. Also excluded are trips to Camp David, the country residence of the president, and to Reagan's Rancho del Cielo ranch in Santa Barbara County, California.

== January ==
State or country	Areas visited	Dates	Details
California	Palm Springs	January 1–2	Stayed at Sunnylands.
Georgia	Atlanta	January 26	Attended a "Spirit of America" rally at the Omni Coliseum. Addressed the Southern Republican Leadership Conference at the Omni International Hotel.
Illinois	Chicago	January 31	Addressed the Concrete and Aggregates Industries Associations convention at the Arie Crown Theater.

== February ==
State or country	Areas visited	Dates	Details
Illinois	Dixon, Eureka	February 6	Attended a parade in his hometown of Dixon celebrating his 73rd birthday. Visited the Ronald Reagan Boyhood Home, Dixon High School, and Jefferson Grade School. Spoke at the Reagan Physical Education Center at Eureka College, where he graduated in 1932.
Nevada	Las Vegas	February 6–7	Addressed the National Association of Secondary School Principals convention at the Las Vegas Convention Center. Attended a Nevada Republican Party fundraiser at the Herbst-Collins Executive Hangar at McCarran International Airport.
Iowa	Waterloo, Des Moines	February 20	Campaigned in the Iowa caucus at the McElroy Auditorium and Veterans Memorial Auditorium. Interviewed at WHO radio station.

== March ==
State or country	Areas visited	Dates	Details
Ohio	Columbus	March 6	Addressed the National Association of Evangelicals at the Hyatt Regency Columbus.
New York	New York	March 6	Attended a New York Republican Party fundraiser at the Waldorf Astoria New York.
Virginia	Charlottesville	March 24	Toured Monticello, joining an ordinary tour group in a visit that was not publicly announced ahead of time.

== April ==
State or country	Areas visited	Dates	Details
Maryland	Baltimore	April 2	Threw out the ceremonial first pitch on Opening Day of Major League Baseball at Baltimore Memorial Stadium. This visit had been canceled for security reasons, but Reagan abruptly decided to go anyway 90 minutes before the game was to begin.
New York	New York	April 5	Addressed the Women Business Owners of New York conference at the Grand Hyatt New York.
Missouri	Claycomo	April 11	Toured the Kansas City Assembly Plant.
Texas	Dallas, Grand Prairie, Arlington	April 11–12	Stayed at the Amfac Hotel in Dalls. Visited the construction site of a new housing development, Oak Hollow, in Grand Prairie. Participated in a roundtable discussion with representatives of the housing industry at the Arlington Hilton.
Washington	Tacoma	April 19	Visited the Weyerhaeuser timber export facility at the Port of Tacoma and Weyerhaeuser headquarters.
Hawaii	Honolulu	April 22–24	Stopover on the way to China. Stayed at the Kahala Hilton. Attended Easter service at the Cathedral Church of Saint Andrew. Visited Washington Place.
Guam	Nimitz Hill Annex	April 25–26	Stopover on the way to China. Stayed at Nimitz House.
China	Beijing, Xi'an, Shanghai	April 26–May 1	State visit. Met with President Li Xiannian and Premier Zhao Ziyang.

== May ==
State or country	Areas visited	Dates	Details
Alaska	Fairbanks	May 1–2	Stopover on the way home from China. Spoke at the University of Alaska Fairbanks student center. Stayed at the home of Senator Frank Murkowski. Met with Pope John Paul II, who was on his way to South Korea, at Fairbanks International Airport.
Colorado	Colorado Springs	May 29–30	Visited the United States Olympic Training Center. Stayed at The Broadmoor. Gave the commencement address at the United States Air Force Academy's Falcon Stadium.

== June ==
State or country	Areas visited	Dates	Details
Ireland	Shannon, Galway, Ballyporeen, Dublin	June 1–4	Met with President Patrick Hillery and Taoiseach Garret FitzGerald. Visited ancestral home. Addressed the Oireachtas.
United Kingdom	London	June 4–10	Attended the 10th G7 summit.
France	Normandy	June 6	Attended commemorative ceremonies of the 40th anniversary of the Allied landing in Normandy. Also present were Canadian prime minister Pierre Trudeau, Queen Beatrix of the Netherlands, King Olav V of Norway, King Baudouin I of Belgium, French president François Mitterrand, Queen Elizabeth II and Jean, Grand Duke of Luxembourg.
New York	Uniondale	June 17	Officially opened the 1984 International Games for the Disabled at the Mitchel Athletic Complex.
New Jersey	Oradell	June 20	Spoke about alcohol awareness at River Dell High School.
Connecticut	Hartford	June 20	Addressed the National Sheriffs' Association conference at the Parkview Hilton.

== July ==
State or country	Areas visited	Dates	Details
Florida	Daytona Beach	July 4	Attended the Pepsi Firecracker 400 at Daytona International Speedway. Visited the Indigo Lakes Resort Hotel.
Alabama	Decatur, Huntsville	July 4–5	Celebrated Independence Day at Point Mallard Park. Stayed at the Huntsville Hilton.
Michigan	Warren, Orion Township	July 5	Toured the General Motors Technical Center and Orion Assembly.
Texas	San Antonio	July 5–6	Stayed at the San Antonio Marriott Riverwalk. Addressed the State Bar of Texas conference at the San Antonio Convention Center.
Maryland	Dorchester County, Tilghman Island	July 10	Visited Blackwater National Wildlife Refuge and Tilghman Elementary School. Boarded an oyster fishing skipjack.
Kentucky	Cave City, Bowling Green	July 12	Toured Mammoth Cave National Park, which was undergoing restoration. Addressed the National Campers and Hikers Association at Beech Bend.
South Carolina	Columbia	July 19	Attended a summit meeting of leaders of Caribbean nations at the University of South Carolina.
Texas	Austin	July 25	Campaign rally at Auditorium Shores. Attended a "Texans for Reagan-Bush" meeting at the Hyatt Regency Austin.
Georgia	Atlanta	July 25–26	Stayed at the Waverly Hotel. Campaign rally at Cumberland Mall.
New Jersey	Elizabeth, Hoboken	July 26	Campaign rally at Elizabeth City Hall. Attended St. Ann's Festival at a Catholic church in Hoboken.
California	Los Angeles	July 28	Attended the 1984 Summer Olympics opening ceremony at the Los Angeles Memorial Coliseum, during which he officially opened the Olympic Games.

== August ==
State or country	Areas visited	Dates	Details
California	Santa Barbara	August 4	Visited the homes of Adnan Khashoggi and Fess Parker.
California	Los Angeles	August 12–15	Stayed at the Century Plaza Hotel, where he met with U.S. Olympic medalists. Attended the wedding of his daughter Patti Davis to Paul Grilley at the Hotel Bel-Air.
Missouri	Sedalia	August 19	Attended the Missouri State Fair.
Ohio	Cincinnati	August 20	Visited Procter & Gamble World Headquarters. Campaign rally at Fountain Square.
Illinois	Decatur	August 20	Campaign rally at Decatur Airport. Attended a forum on agriculture at Millikin University. Visited an Archer Daniels Midland ethanol plant.
Texas	Dallas	August 22–24	Accepted the presidential nomination of the 1984 Republican National Convention at the Dallas Convention Center. Stayed at the Loews Anatole Hotel. Attended an ecumenical prayer breakfast at Reunion Arena.
Illinois	Chicago	August 24	Addressed the Veterans of Foreign Wars convention at The Conrad Hilton, where he also signed a bill making the Illinois and Michigan Canal into the first National Heritage Corridor.

== September ==
State or country	Areas visited	Dates	Details
California	Irvine, Fountain Valley, Cupertino	September 2–3	Stayed at the Irvine Marriott. Campaign rallies at Mile Square Regional Park and De Anza College.
Utah	Salt Lake City	September 3–4	Stayed at the Little America Hotel. Addressed the American Legion convention at the Salt Palace.
Illinois	Chicago	September 4–5	Stayed at the Hyatt Regency Chicago, where he addressed an Economic Club of Chicago "Choosing a Future" conference.
Pennsylvania	Doylestown	September 9	Attended the Polish Festival. Visited the National Shrine of Our Lady of Czestochowa and the gravesite of Polish prime minister Ignacy Jan Paderewski in the adjoining cemetery.
New York	Buffalo, Endicott	September 12	Dedicated Santa Maria Towers, a new assisted living facility in Buffalo. Addressed a luncheon for ethnic community leaders at D'Youville College. Toured IBM offices in Endicott. Campaign rally at Union-Endicott High School.
Tennessee	Nashville	September 13	Addressed the High Technological Corridor Board at the Opryland Hotel. Visited the home of Roy Acuff to celebrate his birthday. Visited the Grand Ole Opry House.
Connecticut	Waterbury	September 19	Campaign rally at Waterbury Green.
New Jersey	Hammonton	September 19	Campaign rally at the First National State Bank building.
Iowa	Cedar Rapids, Norway, Fairfax	September 20	Met with Katie Beckett, namesake of the Katie Beckett Medicaid waiver. Campaign rally at Cedar Rapids Airport. Toured a soybean farm in Norway. Attended a community picnic at St. Patrick's Catholic Church in Fairfax.
Michigan	Grand Rapids	September 20	Toured the Westinghouse Furniture Systems plant. Campaign rally at Gerald R. Ford Bicentennial Park.
New York	New York	September 23–24	Addressed the opening session of the 39th United Nations General Assembly. Stayed at the Waldorf Astoria.
Ohio	Bowling Green, Canton	September 26	Took questions on foreign policy at Bowling Green State University's Anderson Arena. Spoke at the Timken Company Faircrest steel plant.
Wisconsin	Glendale	September 26	Attended Milwaukee's Original Oktoberfest at Old Heidelberg Park.

== October ==
State or country	Areas visited	Dates	Details
Michigan	Detroit	October 1	Presided over a naturalization ceremony for new U.S. citizens, and addressed the Detroit Economic Club, at Cobo Hall.
Mississippi	Gulfport, Biloxi	October 1–2	Met with students from Bayou View Elementary School. Campaign rally at Joseph T. Jones Park. Stayed at the Broadwater Beach Hotel.
Texas	Brownsville, Corpus Christi, Houston	October 2–3	Campaign rallies at Texas Southmost College and Corpus Christi International Airport. Attended a fundraising dinner at Four Seasons Hotel Houston, where he stayed overnight.
Kentucky	Louisville	October 7–8	Participated in the first presidential debate against Walter Mondale at The Kentucky Center for the Performing Arts. Campaign rally at the Hyatt Regency Louisville, where he stayed overnight.
North Carolina	Charlotte	October 8	Campaign rally at The Park Expo and Conference Center.
Maryland	Baltimore	October 8	Dedicated the Christopher Columbus Monument in observance of Columbus Day. Visited the Baltimore Public Works Museum.
Michigan	Redford, Warren	October 10	Spoke at St. Agatha High School, the Ukrainian Cultural Center in Warren, and Macomb County Community College.
Ohio	Dayton, Sidney, Lima, Ottawa, Deshler, Perrysburg	October 12	Campaign rally at Courthouse Square in Dayton. Embarked on a whistle-stop train tour aboard the Heartland Special at Dayton Union Station, speaking at each town from the rear platform of U.S. Car One.
Alabama	Tuscaloosa, Northport	October 15	Spoke at the University of Alabama's Bryant–Denny Stadium. Visited the McDonald's restaurant on McFarland Boulevard for lunch.
Georgia	Macon	October 15	Campaign rally at City Hall.
South Carolina	Greenville	October 15	Campaign rally at Greenville Technical College.
Illinois	Romeoville, Bolingbrook, Glen Ellyn	October 16	Spoke at the WILCO Area Career Center in Romeoville and Bolingbrook High School. Campaign rally at the College of DuPage Field House.
New York	New York	October 18	Attended the Alfred E. Smith Memorial Dinner at the Waldorf Astoria.
Missouri	Kansas City	October 21–22	Campaign rally at the Westin Crown Center, where he stayed overnight. Participated in the second presidential debate against Walter Mondale at Municipal Auditorium.
California	Palmdale, San Diego	October 22	Spoke at the Rockwell International plant in Palmdale. Campaign rally at the San Diego County Administration Center.
Oregon	Medford, Portland	October 22–23	Campaign rally at Medford–Jackson County Airport. Stayed at the Benson Hotel. Campaign rally at the University of Portland's Chiles Center.
Washington	Seattle	October 23	Campaign rally at the Seattle Center.
Ohio	Columbus	October 23–24	Stayed at the Hyatt on Capitol Square, where he addressed the Ohio Association of Broadcasters. Campaign rally at Ohio State University's St. John Arena. Visited the university's Tau Kappa Epsilon house, a chapter of the fraternity Reagan had belonged to in college.
New York	Valley Stream	October 26	Addressed the congregation at Temple Hillel.
Connecticut	Fairfield	October 26	Campaign rally at Fairfield Town Hall, where he also signed an extension to the Wetlands Loan Act.
New Jersey	Hackensack	October 26	Campaign rally at City Hall. Visited Wellington Hall Nursing Home.
Pennsylvania	Millersville, Media	October 29	Campaign rallies at Millersville University and the Delaware County Courthouse in Media.
West Virginia	Parkersburg	October 29	Campaign rally at the Parkersburg High School Field House.

== November ==
State or country	Areas visited	Dates	Details
Massachusetts	Boston	November 1	Campaign rally at Boston City Hall.
New York	Rochester	November 1	Campaign rally at Rochester Community War Memorial Arena.
Michigan	Detroit, Freeland	November 1–2	Campaign rally at Lincoln Park Shopping Center. Stayed at the Westin Renaissance Center. Campaign rally at Tri-City Airport.
Ohio	Cleveland	November 2	Campaign rally at the Cuyahoga County Courthouse.
Illinois	Springfield	November 2	Campaign rally at the Illinois State Capitol.
Arkansas	Little Rock	November 3	Stayed at the Excelsior Hotel. Campaign rally at the Statehouse Convention Center.
Iowa	Winterset	November 3	Campaign rally at the Madison County Courthouse. Visited the childhood home of John Wayne.
Wisconsin	Milwaukee	November 3–4	Spoke at the Wesley Park Senior Center. Campaign rally at American Serb Hall. Stayed at the Hyatt Regency Milwaukee.
Minnesota	Rochester	November 4	Spoke at Rochester Municipal Airport.
Missouri	St. Louis	November 4	Campaign rally at the Gateway Arch.
Illinois	Rosemont	November 4	Campaign rally at the Rosemont Horizon Arena.
California	Sacramento, Los Angeles, San Diego, Solvang	November 4–6	Stayed at the Red Lion Motor Inn in Sacramento. Campaign rallies at the California State Capitol, Los Angeles Pierce College, and Fashion Valley Mall. Stayed at the Century Plaza Hotel. Voted in the 1984 United States presidential election at the Solvang Veterans Memorial Building. Celebrated his victory in the election at the home of Marion Jorgensen and at the Century Plaza Hotel.

== December ==
State or country	Areas visited	Dates	Details
California	Los Angeles, Palm Springs	December 27–31	Stayed at the Century Plaza Hotel. Had his hearing aid examined by an otolaryngologist in Westlake. Stayed at Sunnylands.
