= Qi yoga =

Qi yoga (Qi-Yoga) is a term occasionally used by practitioners mixing techniques or philosophies of Chinese qigong and Hindu yoga, see:

- Daoyin (a.k.a. "Taoist yoga")
- Yin yoga
