= Judson School =

K–12 boarding school in Paradise Valley, Arizona (1928–2000)

Location
- 6704 North Mockingbird Lane; Paradise Valley, Arizona; United States

Information
- School type: Boarding school
- Opened: 1928
- Closed: 2000
- Grades: K–12
- Mascot: Cougars

The Judson School was a K–12 boarding school in Paradise Valley, Arizona. It closed in 2000 after more than 70 years of operation. It was owned and operated by Henry and Comstance Wick, along with their son, Henry Wick.

In 1928, Judson School opened with seven boys as students. Judson was the state's oldest independent college preparatory school. Henry Wick, who had been teaching at Judson School since 1938, purchased the school from George Judson in 1945. In the late 1940s, Henry Wick began offering classes in English as a Second Language. This brought students from all around the world representing, at times, 30 different countries. Girls were admitted to Judson School for the first time in 1956. Henry Wick sold the 55-acre Judson School property to Cachet Homes in the fall of 1999. In the summer of 2001, the campus buildings were demolished to make way for a gated community of 34 luxury homes. A small structure has been built on the property as a memorial to 72 years of Judson School history although the structure now serves as a security gate house and the secondary room as a janitorial storage part-time

== Notable alumni ==
- Michael Reagan (class of 1964), conservative political commentator and adopted son of 40th United States President Ronald Reagan.
- Patti Davis, daughter of Ronald Reagan.
- Lea Grey Dimond (class of 1972), daughter of Audrey Geisel and stepdaughter of Ted Geisel (Dr. Seuss).
