= Emergency Wetlands Resources Act =

United States federal environmental law (enacted 1986)

Emergency Wetlands Resources Act of 1986
- Long title: Emergency Wetlands Resources Act of 1986 was enacted to protect and promote conservation of the Nations wetlands and establish National Wildlife Refuges for waterfowl.
- Acronyms (colloquial): EWRA
- Enacted by: the 99th United States Congress
- Effective: November 10, 1986

Citations
- Public law: P.L. 99-645
- Statutes at Large: 100 Stat. 3582

Codification
- U.S.C. sections created: 16 U.S.C. § 3901-3902, § 3911-3912, § 3921-3932, & § 3931-3932

Legislative history
- Introduced in the House as Emergency Wetlands Resources Act of 1985 by John Breaux (D–LA) on February 21, 1985; Committee consideration by House Merchant Marine and Fisheries, House Interior and Insular Affairs; Signed into law by President Ronald Reagan on November 10, 1986

Major amendments
- P.L. 100-418, P.L. 101-233, P.L. 102-440, P.L. 103-437, P.L. 104-4, P.L. 104-28, P.L. 105-18, P.L. 105-83, P.L. 108-447

The Emergency Wetlands Resources Act of 1986 became a United States federal law (P.L.) 99-645 (100 Stat. 3582) on November 10, 1986. Prior to the Act the purchase of wetlands by the Federal Government had been prohibited. The Act allocated funds from the Land and Water Conservation Fund (LWCF) for the purchase of wetlands by the Secretary of Interior, who is head of the United States Department of the Interior. The Act also instituted a National Wetlands Priority Conservation Plan which was to be established and set up by the Secretary. Included in this plan was a requirement for all States to include wetlands as part of their Comprehensive Outdoors Recreation plan. The plan also transferred the Migratory Bird Conservation Fund amounts which were to be equal to the import duties on arms and ammunition. The main purpose of the Act was to ensure a follow through on international obligations and fulfillment of these obligations on the various past and future migratory bird treaties. It also promoted the conservation of wetlands so the benefits they provide could be maintained.

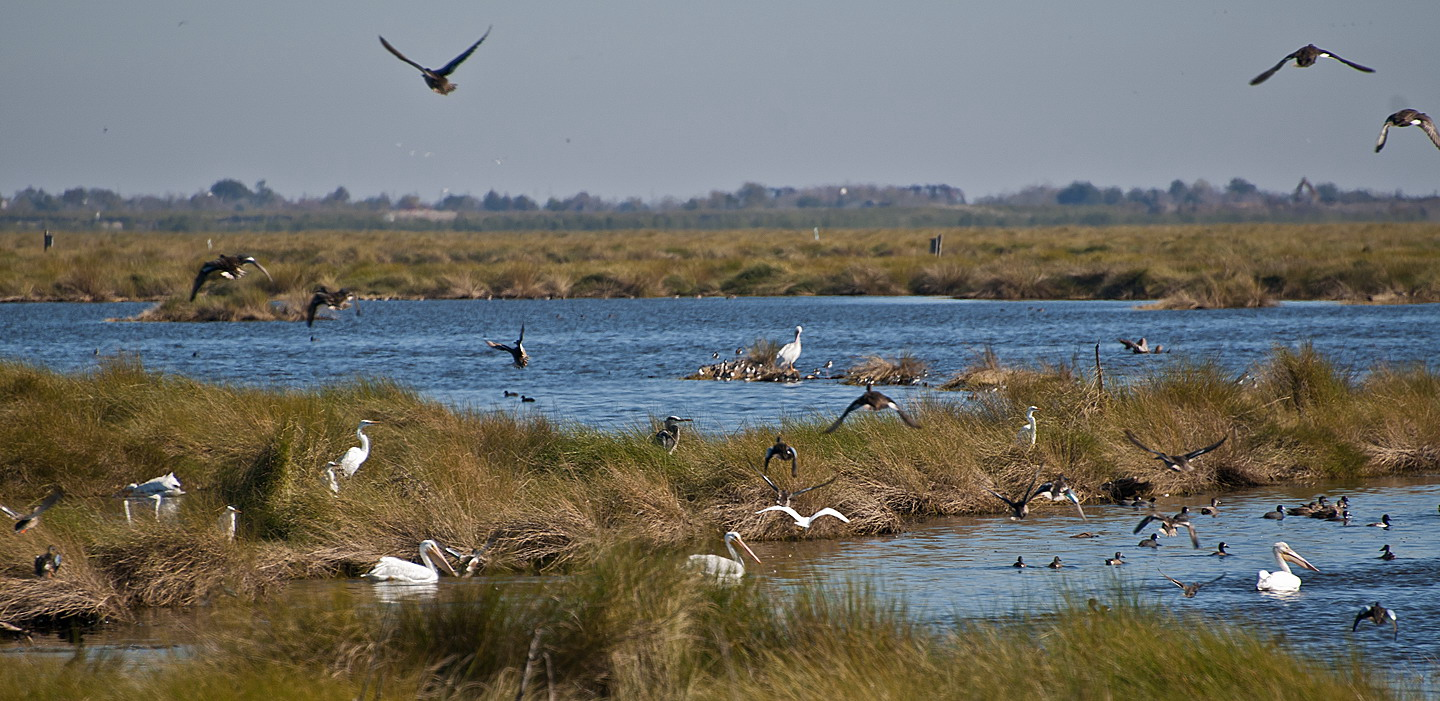
A rather amazing diversity of waterfowl concentrated in a wetlands management area of Bayou Sauvage National Wildlife Refuge. At least 20 species are in this frame of view or the sky above. A Northern Harrier is hidden behind the center Great Blue Heron. Photo taken by Mr. Bill Lang on 12/9/2010. Photograph used with written permission from Mr. Lang.

An extension of the Wetlands Loan Act of 1961 which had been established and approved on October 4, 1961 was also provided by the Act. Under this extension wetlands loan advances would be forgiven and the appropriation extended through September 30, 1988. A requirement was outlined in the Act which instructed the Secretary to report to the United States Congress on all losses of wetlands. The Secretary was to also investigate these losses and outline his findings in these reports to provide information as to whether or not federal programs and/or policies contributed to any of the wetland losses. Other responsibilities tasked to the Secretary were to complete the mapping of all the wetlands in the contiguous United States and those in the non-contiguous portions of the U.S. by September 30, 1990. This was to be done in conjunction with inventorying all of the National Wetlands which were to be completed eight years later on September 30, 1998 with continuation at ten-year intervals thereafter. Updates were to be provided to previous reports to help update and improve the “Status and Trends of Wetlands and Deep-water Habitat in the Coterminous United States, 1950s to 1970s” from September 1982.

Included within the Act were several provisions to establish entrance fees to all National Wildlife Refuges and to also establish the Bayou Sauvage National Wildlife Refuge in Louisiana. Funds collected from these entrance fees were to be split, with 70% going to the Migratory Bird Conservation Fund and 30% to the maintenance and operation of the refuges. The cost of Federal Duck Stamps were also increased from $7.50 to $15.00, this was to be phased in through 1991. The sale of Federal Duck Stamps to raise money for the conservation of migratory birds was established in 1929 by the Migratory Bird Conservation Act.

Later amendments to the Act allowed the establishment of Demonstration Fee programs. These fee programs established entrance and recreational use fees that allowed refuges and area agencies that participated in the programs to retain 80% of all fees collected. This of course superseded the 70/30 fee allocation that was first set up by the Emergency Wetlands Resources Act of 1986. The amendments were added to the Act through the Interior Appropriation Act Sec. 315 FY 1996 (P.L. 104-4; 110 Stat. 1321), as amended by P.L. 104-28 (110 Stat. 3009), P.L. 105-18, (111 Stat. 158) and P.L. 105-83 (111 Stat. 1543).

== The Act of 1986 Chapter 59 ==
=== Subchapter I – General Provisions ===
Subchapter I of the Act known as 16 U.S.C § 3901 - 3902 outlines the findings, purposes, and definitions of the Act. Congress found that wetlands played a pivotal role in not only the economics of the Nation but also the health, safety, recreations, and well-being of the citizens as well. Wetlands also provided major contributions to our food supply, water supply/quality, flood control, fish, wildlife, and plant resources.

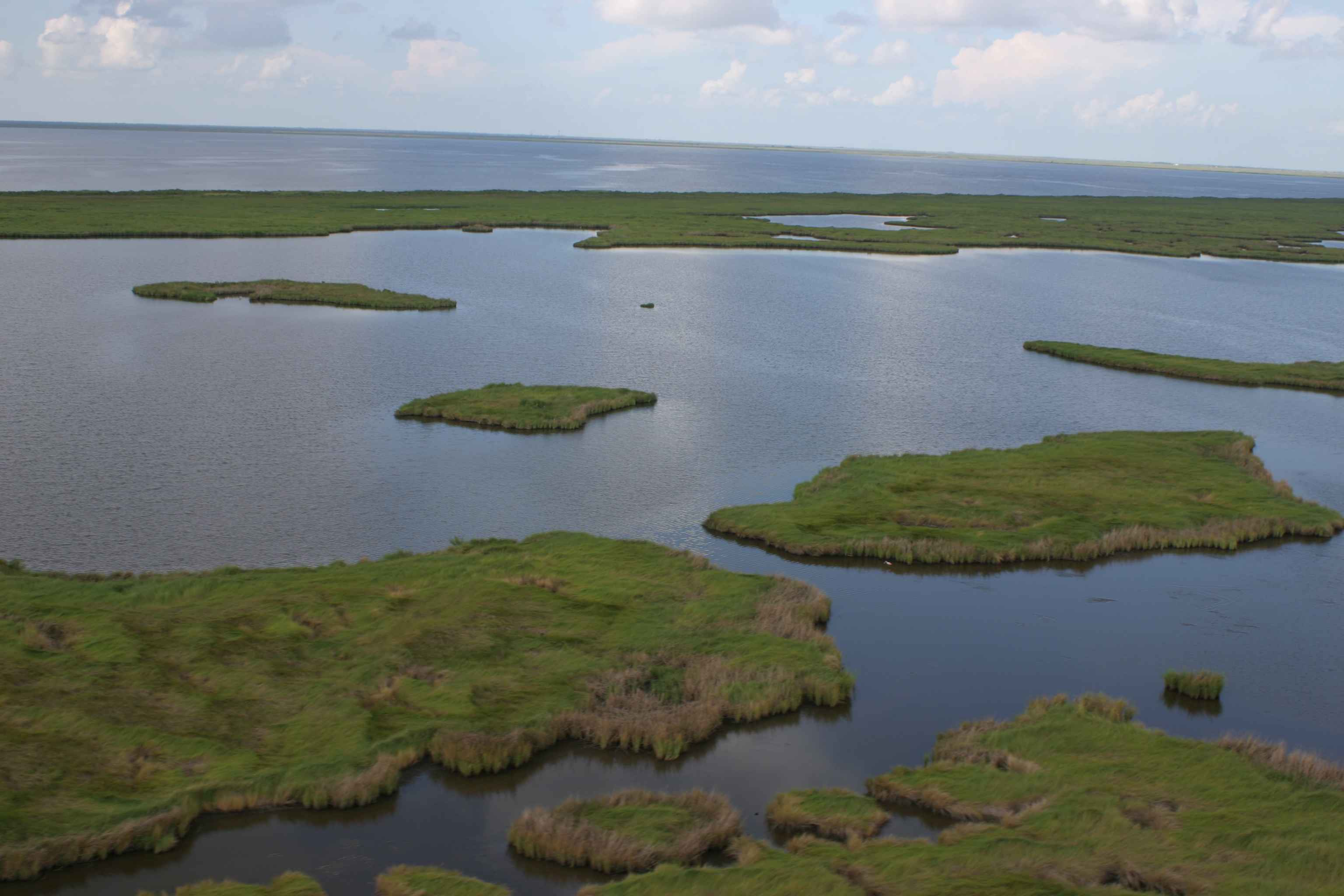
Aerial View of Marsh

Federal protection of wetlands for migratory birds was also a major finding, in order to uphold the Nations commitment to the migratory bird treaties with other nations like Canada, Mexico, Japan, the Union of Soviet Socialist Republics (U.S.S.R.), and several other countries in the Western Hemisphere protection was needed to ensure migratory bird populations stayed at a sustainable level as wetlands are the major sources for breeding, wintering, and migration.

With obligations to other countries and a clearer understanding of how important wetlands are to the well-being of society and to the overall health of the ecosystem the major purpose of the Act was the promotion and conservation of the Nations wetlands. This would ensure that no further damage would be done and the benefits that wetlands provide would be maintained. This would be done with the assistance of Federal and State programs.

=== Subchapter II – Revenues for Refuge Operations and the Migratory Bird Conservation Fund ===
Subchapter II of the Act 16 U.S.C § 3911 – 3912 outlined the sale of admission permits at refuges and the transfers to the Migratory Bird Conservation Fund. The Land and Water Conservation Fund Act of 1965 for the most part provided the funds for the purchase of wetlands, but in order to sustain the operation and maintenance cost of refuges supplementary revenues were needed. Section 3911 of Subchapter II granted the Secretary of the Interior the power to charge admission fees at National Wildlife Refuges as well as the sales of Golden Eagle and Golden Age Passports. Amounts collected from the sale of admission permits and fees collected at refuges were to be divided at a 70/30 split. The Secretary had 30% available for financing the cost of collection, maintenance and operation of the refuges, and the upkeep of all the refuges in the National Wildlife System while 70% was to be deposited into the Migratory Bird Conservation Fund which was established under section 718d of the title.

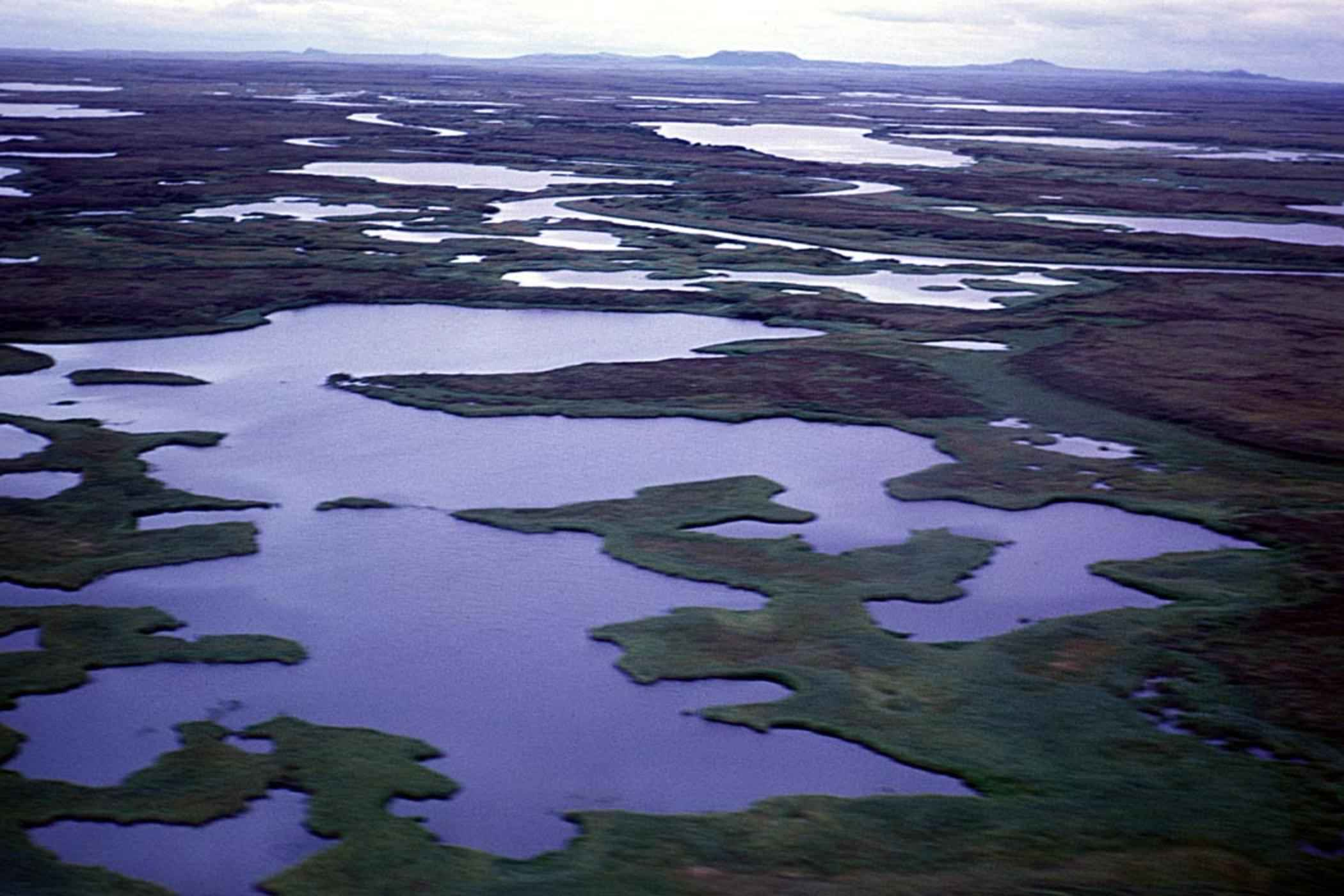
Hazen Bay Wetlands

Section 3912 of Subchapter II stated that amounts equal to the total amount of all import duties collected on arms and ammunition which had been specified in chapter 93 of the Harmonized Tariff Schedule of the United States would be paid quarterly to the Migratory Bird Conservation Fund which was established under section 718d beginning the next fiscal year after November 10, 1986.

=== Subchapter III – State and Federal Wetlands Acquisition ===
Subchapter III 16 U.S.C § 3921 – 3923 established the National Wetlands Priority Conservation Plan, Federal Acquisition, and Restriction on Use of Eminent Domain in Acquisitions. The establishment of the National Wetlands Priority Conservation Plan section 3921 was to be carried out by the Secretary. The plan was to outline the types of wetlands and the interests in wetlands on a region-by-regions basis that were to be considered for purchase by both Federal and State. Continual revisions and reviews of the plan were also to be carried out by the Secretary with the consultation of Administrator of the Environmental Protection Agency, Secretary of Commerce, Secretary of Agriculture, and the chief executive officer of each State. Several factors were to be considered with the establishment of the plan. The Secretary was to consider the remaining types of wetlands that existed at the time of European settlement, the rate at which current and future losses of the respective types of wetlands, and the types of wetlands that made contributions to all wildlife which includes threatened and endangered species, migratory birds, resident species, sport and commercial fisheries, quantity and quality of surface water and ground water, flood control, outdoor recreation, and other appropriate areas of concern which the Secretary deems appropriate.

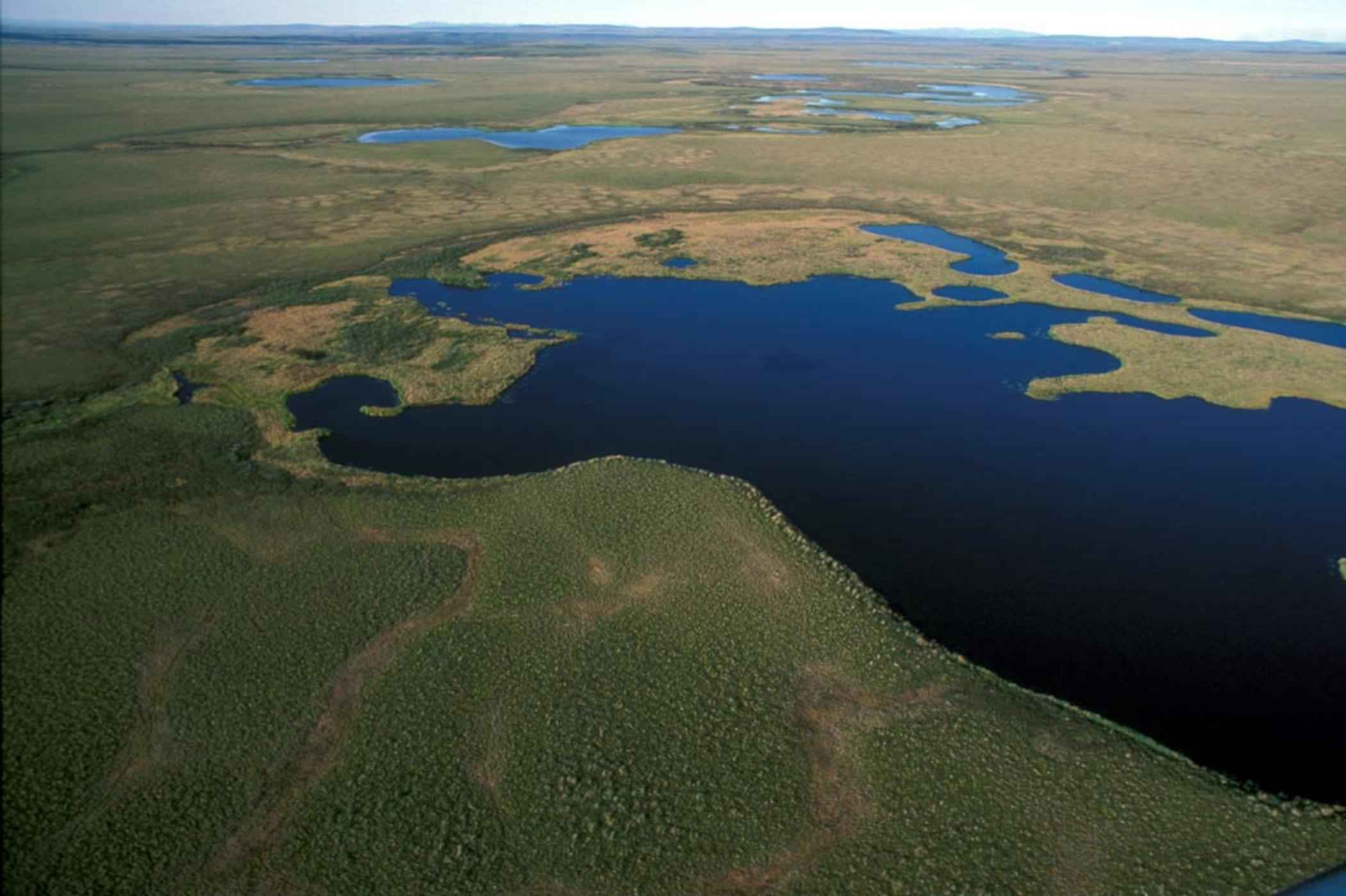
Aerial View of National Park Wetlands

Section 3922 dealt with the Federal acquisition of wetlands. The Secretary was only authorized to purchase wetlands that were not under the authority of the Migratory Bird Conservation Act of 1929 (16 U.S.C 715-715s). Purchases made by the Secretary had to be consistent with the terms laid out in section 3921.

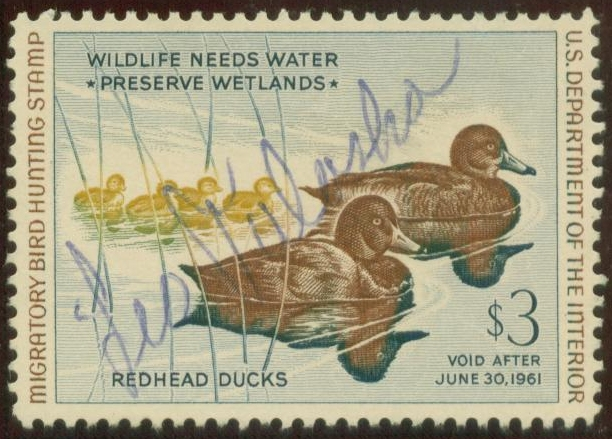
Federal Duck Stamp, signed by hunter as required for legal use. Sale of stamps were enacted by the Migratory Bird Conservation Act of 1929. Advancements from money earned from the sale of Duck Stamps is what provided funding for the Wetlands Loan Act of 1961.

Section 3923 prohibited the use of Eminent Domain as a way of acquiring wetlands. It stated that acquisition of wetlands which were built for ranching, farming, or for the purpose of conservation of either could not be acquired through the powers of the Condemnation Act of 1888 or Eminent Domain.

=== Subchapter IV – Wetlands Inventory and Trend Analysis ===
Subchapter IV 16 U.S.C § 3931 – 3932 dealt with the National Wetlands Inventory Project and Reports to Congress. Section 3931 instructed the Secretary along with the Director of the United States Fish and Wildlife Service to continue the Inventory Project of the National Wetlands. By September 30, 1988 the maps were to be completed for the entire coastal zone of the United States, floodplains of all major rivers, and the Prairie Pothole regions; ten years later on September 30, 1998 maps of the rest of the contiguous United States were to be completed and presented. All other noncontiguous portions of the United States were to be completed two years later by the same date. A deadline of September 30, 1990 was set for the beginning of reports to be presented to update and improve the information outlined in the report entitled “Status and Trends of Wetlands and Deepwater Habitat in the Coterminous United States, 1950s to 1970s” dated September 1982. These reports were to be presented every 10 years to ensure all information was kept up-to-date. All wetlands maps were to be digitized and a digital wetlands database was to be set up to provide digital access to all maps on wetlands contained in the United States.

Section 3932 provided a guideline for the reports to Congress and the contents of these reports. The Secretary of Agriculture along with the Secretary of the Interior were instructed to coordinate with each other in the preparation and submission of reports to all invested committees. The content of these reports were to provide a detailed analysis of the cause of wetland destruction, degradation, protection, and enhancement. Also to be provided in the reports were an analysis of all Federal expenditures which resulted in wetlands destruction, degradation, protection or enhancement.
