= Carl Sferrazza Anthony =

American author and commentator

Carl Sferrazza Anthony is an American author, historian, and commentator known primarily for his extensive scholarship on the First Ladies of the United States, presidential families, and White House history. He served as a speechwriter for Nancy Reagan, the First Lady of President Ronald Reagan, and later became the historian at the National First Ladies' Library in Canton, Ohio.

Anthony's books and articles have explored the often-underestimated political and social influence of First Ladies, significantly contributing to the scholarly and popular understanding of their roles in American politics and culture. He has authored over a dozen books, including comprehensive histories such as First Ladies: The Saga of the Presidents’ Wives and Their Power and individual biographies on notable figures such as Jacqueline Kennedy, Florence Harding, and Nellie Taft. Anthony frequently appears in media as an expert commentator on presidential and White House history.

Charles Sferrazza Anthony was a contributing editor at George and a producer for the television movie The Reagans (2003), based on one of his books.

He currently resides in California.

== Bibliography ==
- First Ladies: The Saga of the Presidents' Wives and Their Power published by William Morrow, New York, New York Volume 1: 1789–1961 (1990) Volume 2: 1961–1990 (1991)
- America's Most Influential First Ladies, Oliver Press in Minneapolis, Minnesota (1992)
- As We Remember Her: Jacqueline Kennedy Onassis, in the Words of Her Family and Friends, HarperCollins in New York, New York (1997)
- Florence Harding: The First Lady, the Jazz Age, and the Death of America's Most Scandalous President, William Morrow in New York, New York (1998)
- America's First Families: An Inside View of Two Hundred Years of Private Life in the White House, Touchstone in New York, New York (2000)
- The Kennedy White House: Family Life and Pictures, 1961–1963, Simon & Schuster in New York (2001)
- Heads of State, Bloomsbury in New York (2004)
- Nellie Taft: The Unconventional First Lady of the Ragtime Era, William Morrow in New York (2005)
- Edith Wilson: The First, First Lady President
- Camera Girl: The Coming of Age of Jackie Bouvier Kennedy, Simon & Schuster in New York (2023)
