= Sarah Powers =

Teacher of modern yoga

Sarah Powers (born c. 1963) is a yoga teacher. She co-founded the Insight Yoga Institute and created Insight Yoga, a combination of yoga, transpersonal psychology and Buddhist and Taoist philosophy, described in her 2008 book of the same name. She was closely involved with the creation of Yin Yoga.

== Life ==
=== Early life ===
Sarah Powers began yoga in 1986 at the Institute of Transpersonal Psychology, as a component of her degree there.

Her career was driven by a life-changing accident in a yoga class led by "a senior yoga teacher". The teacher instructed the class to begin with Sirsasana, yoga headstand without warm-up preliminaries. From there the woman suggested the class drop straight into a headstand backbend (Dvi Pada Viparita Dandasana, an advanced pose, rated 24 by B. K. S. Iyengar). Powers, "with the lethal combination of a bendy back mixed with unbridled enthusiasm to try new things", complied. The teacher asked them to do it again, and as Powers lifted her legs from the backbend, her lower back gave an audible crack and a searing pain from a vertebral subluxation in the lumbar region. Recovery was lengthy, involving "chiropractors and acupuncturists". She lost the ability to perform such advanced backbends, but learnt therapeutic yoga under T. K. V. Desikachar and Gary Kraftsow. The injured back led her to try the gentler Yin Yoga under the instruction of Paul Grilley.

=== Career ===
Powers began teaching yoga in 1987. In 2008 she created Insight Yoga, a combination of modern yoga, transpersonal psychology and Buddhist and Taoist philosophy including Chinese meridian theory, co-founding the Insight Yoga Institute with Ty Powers. Insight Yoga's style is a blend of the soft, slow and gentle Yin Yoga, a name that she devised, with a more typical "hatha yoga" practice, that she calls Yang (harder) by contrast, influenced by schools such as Iyengar Yoga and Ashtanga (vinyasa) yoga. She has given workshops at the Esalen Institute and other centres around the world. She was identified by Yoga Journal as one of the people who had "each, independently, discovered the benefits of merging mindfulness with asana", leading to "something we might call 'mindful yoga'."

=== Personal life ===
She is married with Ty Powers. They have a daughter and live in the San Francisco Bay Area.

== Insight Yoga ==
Insight Yoga, introduced by Powers's 2008 book of that name, balances Yin Yoga with conventional 'Yang' yoga, and integrates both with Chinese Medicine, in particular its meridian lines, and with the Vipassana meditation style of Buddhism, emphasising mindfulness. Powers describes the integration with Chinese Medicine as making her yoga practice more skilful, "like learning to be my own personal acupuncturist—only without the needles".

== Works ==
- 2008: Insight Yoga. Shambhala, ISBN 978-1590305980
- 2021: Lit from Within. Shambhala, ISBN 978-1611808506

== Sources ==
- Gates, Janice (2006). Yogini: Women Visionaries of the Yoga World. Mandala. pp. 113–118. ISBN 978-1932771886.
- Powers, Sarah (2008). Insight Yoga. Shambhala. ISBN 978-1-59030-598-0. OCLC 216937520.
