= Wetlands Loan Act =

United States federal environmental law (enacted 1961)

The Wetlands Loan Act of 1961 (16 USC 715k-3 – 715k-5) (75 Stat. 813) became Public Law (P.L.) 87-383 on October 4, 1961. The law allowed an advance against future earnings from the sale of Federal Duck Stamps. This allowed a means of accelerated funding for the acquisition of migratory waterfowl habitats.

== Amendments ==
=== December 15, 1969 and February 18, 1976 ===
90-205 (81 Stat. 612) was approved for public law on December 15, 1969. Seven years later public law 94-215 (90 Stat. 189) was approved on February 18, 1976. These two public laws extended the loan ceiling to U.S. $200 million as well as extended the loan through September 30, 1983.

The advances were to be repaid to the Treasury beginning in 1984 with the receipts from the sales of duck stamps. The appropriated funds were to be merged with duck stamp receipts in the Migratory Bird Conservation Fund with use going to the acquisition of migratory bird refuges and waterfowl production areas introduced with the Migratory Bird Conservation Act of 1929.

=== December 2, 1983 ===
Public Law 98-200 (97 Stat. 1373) extended the running of the Act through September 29, 1984.

=== October 26, 1984 ===
Public Law 98-548 (98 Stat. 2774) once again extended the running of the Act through September 30, 1986.

=== November 10, 1986 ===
Public Law 99-645 (100 Stat. 3584) this forgave the wetlands loan advances and extended the appropriation authorization through September 30, 1988. This was also a part of the Emergency Wetlands Resources Act.

=== November 11, 1988 ===
Public Law 100-653 (100 Stat. 3827) extended the loan authorization again until all authorized amounts were expended. Approximately $197,439,000.00 had been appropriated under the authority as of 1989.

== Reintroduction in Congress ==
On June 18, 2007 Congressman Mike Thompson (CA) along with Congressman Don Young (AK) as a co-sponsor reintroduced the Wetlands Loan Act. This was done in an effort to have wetland conservation keep pace with the rising land prices.

The bill aimed to reinvigorate long-term protection of wetlands and associated habitats in the United States. The Act would authorize an advance of $400 million against future Federal Duck Stamp sales over a 10-year period to protect wetlands and waterfowl as well as other wildlife in key Areas.

The additional duck stamp revenue would be used to protect and conserve breeding habitats for the future of waterfowl and waterfowling. The money would go to help Areas like California’s Central valley which has become very expensive to allow landowner to protect the land.

With an average loss of 80,000 acres each year in the U.S. passage of the Wetlands Loan Act would ensure that land owners would have a partnership with the United States Fish and Wildlife Service to voluntarily conserve the land through conservation easements.

With the advancement in funds the U.S. Wildlife Service would use the money that the Act generated to purchase lands for national wildlife refuges. These funds would also assist land owners in protecting existing wetlands that surround duck breeding habitats in key breeding grounds as well as other areas across the United States.

The current Wetlands Loan Act would be modeled after the original Act that legislation authorized in the Wetlands Loan Act of 1961. This would allow borrowing against future federal duck stamp revenues from the sales to hunters and other conservationists.

Since 1934 over 119 million stamps have been sold, primarily to waterfowl hunters. This has generated an investment of more than $700 million to protect more than 5 million acres of habitat in the U.S. Federal Duck Stamp revenues have been the primary sources of funding to purchase small wetlands and associated uplands in the Prairie Pothole Regions, for which these areas are known as Waterfowl Protection Areas and are managed by the U.S. Fish and Wildlife Service.
