= David Sills (judge) =

American jurist (1938–2011)

Presiding Justice for the Fourth District, Division 3 of the California Court of Appeals
- In office August 28, 1990 – June 1, 2011
- Appointed by: George Deukmejian

Judge of the Orange County Superior Court
- In office 1985–1990
- Appointed by: George Deukmejian

Mayor of Irvine, California
- In office 1981 – July 9, 1985
- Succeeded by: C. David Baker

Member of the Irvine City Council
- In office 1976–1985

Personal details
- Born: David George Sills; March 21, 1938 Peoria, Illinois, U.S.
- Died: August 23, 2011 (aged 73) Irvine, California, U.S.
- Spouse: Maureen Reagan (m. 1964; div. 1968)
- Relatives: Ronald Reagan (ex-father-in-law)
- Education: Bradley University, University of Illinois
- Occupation: Lawyer, judge, politician

Military service
- Branch/service: United States Marine Corps
- Years of service: 1960–1965
- Rank: Captain

David George Sills (March 21, 1938 – August 23, 2011) was an American jurist. Sills served as the presiding justice for the California Court of Appeal for the Fourth Appellate District, Division Three. He was a former mayor of Irvine, California, the largest planned city in the United States.

== Background ==
Sills received a B.S. from Bradley University in 1959 and his legal degree from the University of Illinois College of Law in 1961.

He served in the U.S. Marine Corps between 1960 and 1965, reaching the rank of captain. He had a private law practice in Orange County, California between 1965 and 1985.

Sills was a member of the Republican State Central Committee of California from 1966 to 1968 and Chairman of the Republican Associates of Orange County from 1968 to 1969.

He was an elected member of the Irvine City Council between 1976 and 1985, serving as mayor for four years during that period. During his tenure he worked with the Council to responsibly manage the rapid growth Irvine was experiencing at the time.

Sills was appointed as a judge to California's Superior Court in 1985 by Governor George Deukmejian and served there until being elevated to be the Presiding Justice at the Court of Appeal by Governor Deukmejian in 1990. He authored approximately 2,400 legal opinions.

He was also the Irvine Health Foundation's founding Chairman and remained for 26 years. During his service over $25 Million was granted to philanthropic organizations in Orange County to improve health issues for those in need.

== Personal life ==
From 1964 to 1968, Sills was married to Maureen Reagan, the daughter of U.S. President Ronald Reagan.

Prior to developing knee problems, Sills was a marathon runner who often competed in the Boston Marathon. He enjoyed wood working and had a full range of tools and machines in his garage, fondly known as the "Sills Cabinet Shop." Sills had an extensive library at his Irvine home and studied history and politics.
