= Paulie Zink =

American martial arts champion

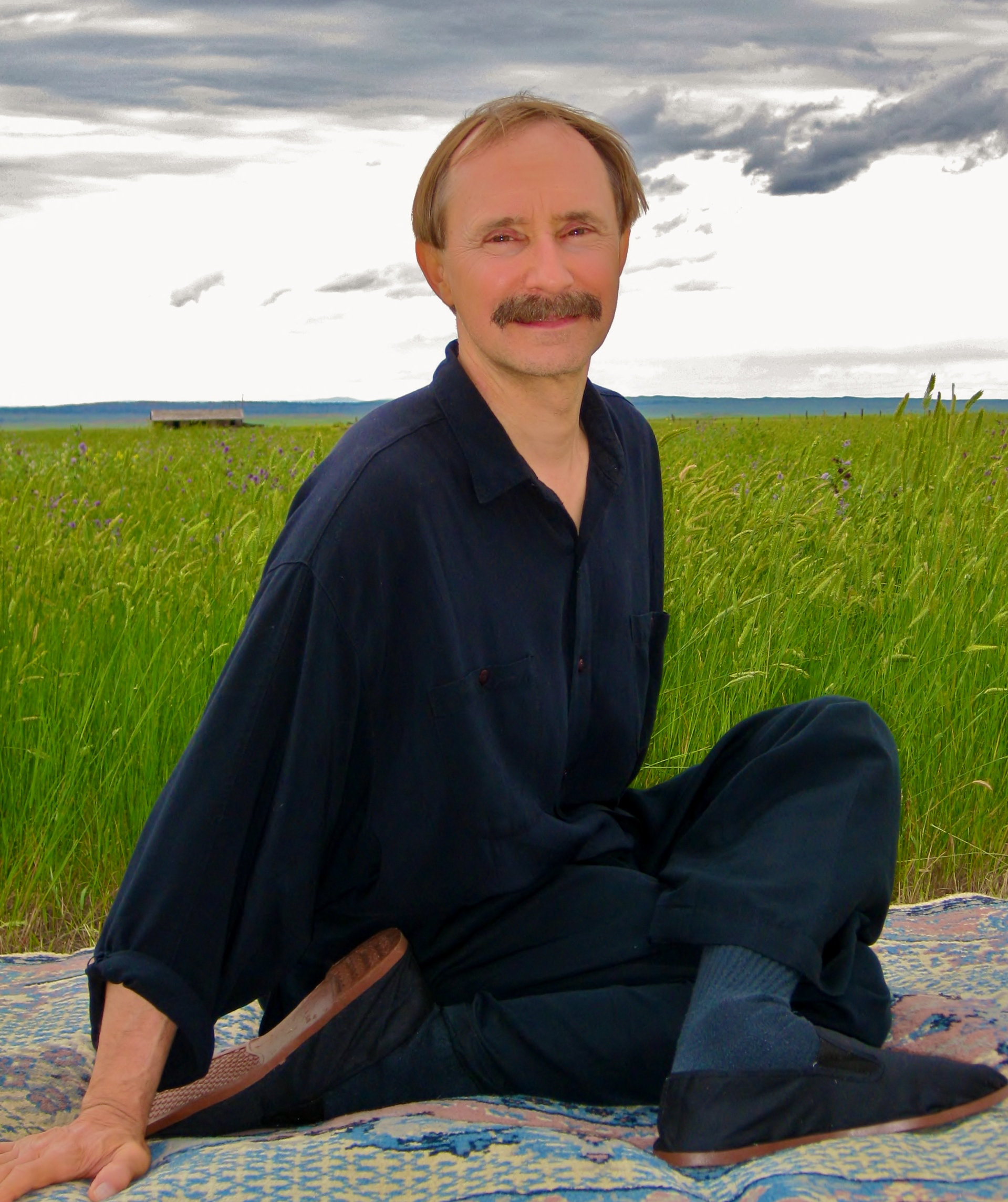
Paulie Zink

Paulie Zink is an American martial arts champion, Daoyin teacher and well known practitioner of Monkey Kung Fu. He founded Yin yoga which is also known as Yin and Yang Yoga.

Growing up in Hollywood, California, Zink was exposed to Zen teahouses by his father and to modern yoga by the hippies who practiced it on the streets of Hollywood Boulevard around him. At 14, he began practicing yoga, too, learning from The Complete Illustrated Book of Yoga and the yoga programs on PBS television with Richard Hittleman and Lilias, Yoga and You with Lilias Folan. At 16, he began studying kung fu. While he was attending the Los Angeles City College, Cho Chat Ling—a student from Hong Kong—showed him that he could improve his kung fu through foundational advanced yoga postures. Thereafter, Zink studied privately with Cho for a decade, learning three separate styles of kung fu. Zink was trained as Cho Chat Ling's protege to expose the styles of kung fu to the west. During this period, Zink began to compete successfully in martial arts tournaments, ultimately taking the Long Beach International Karate Championship three consecutive years (1981,1982 and 1983). He won Grand Champion in the "weapons forms" category all three years and Grand Champion in the "empty hands" category, two of the three years.

Zink began teaching yoga in the late 1970s, when he founded Yin yoga by synthesizing Daoist disciplines and Hatha yoga with his own created postures and approach.

== Awards and honors ==
- Hall of Fame, Kung Fu Artist of the Year, 1989 Black Belt Magazine
- Hall of Fame, Lifetime Achievement Award, 1987 Martial Arts Magazine
- Hall of Fame, Competitor of the Year, 1983 Inside Kung Fu Magazine
- Hall of Fame, Complete Martial Arts.com
- Long Beach International Karate Championships, California

(Non Combative Divisions)

- Grand Champion Empty Hands 1981, 1982
- Grand Champion Weapons 1981, 1982, 1983
