= Ron Reagan =

American progressive political commentator

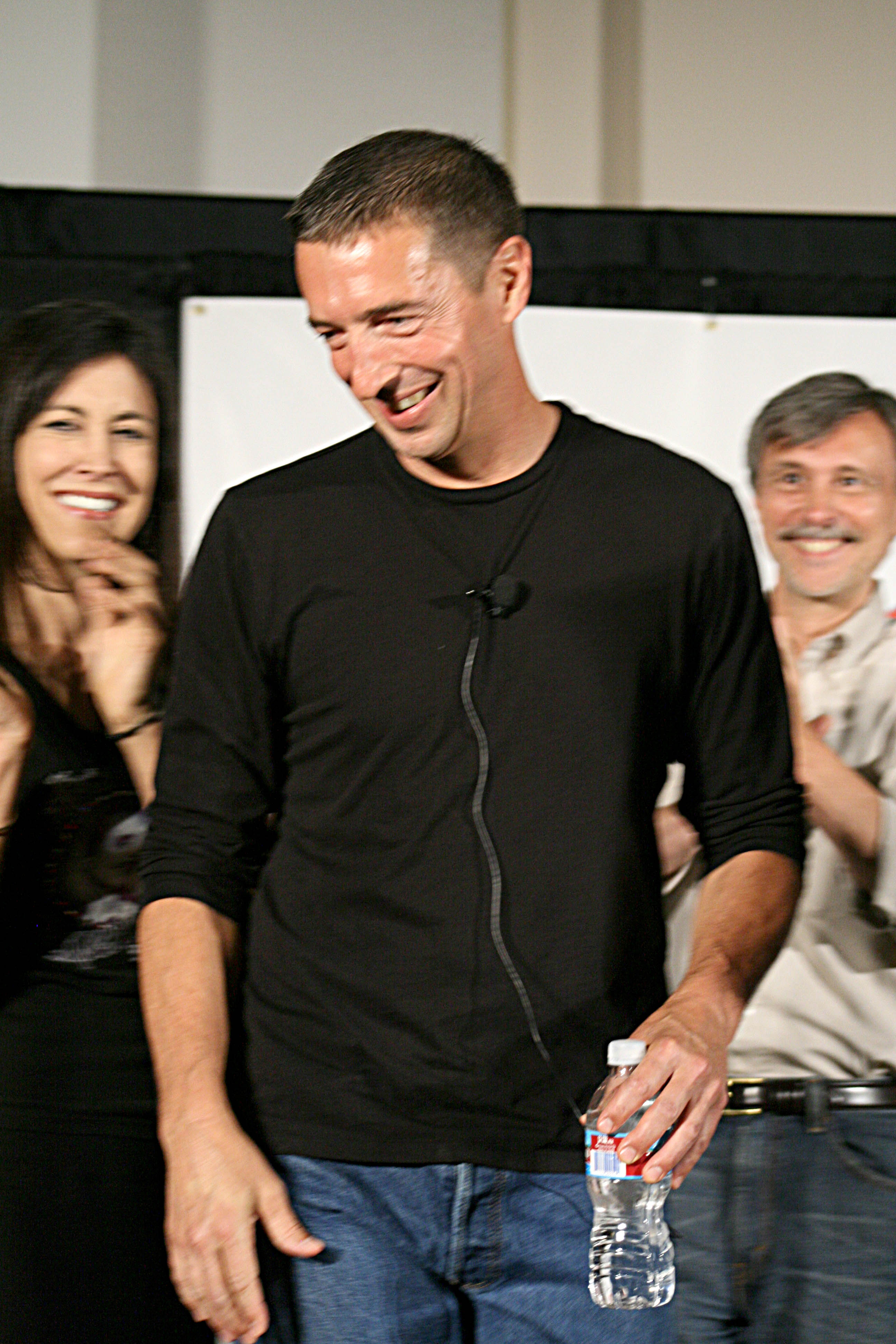
- Reagan in 2008
- Born: Ronald Prescott Reagan; May 20, 1958 (age 68); Los Angeles, California, U.S.
- Occupations: Radio show host; television host; writer
- Political party: Independent
- Spouses: Doria Palmieri (m. 1980; died 2014); Federica Basagni (m. 2018)
- Parents: Ronald Reagan; Nancy Davis
- Relatives: Patti Davis (sister); Maureen Reagan (half-sister); Michael Reagan (adoptive brother)

Ronald Prescott Reagan (born May 20, 1958) is an American political commentator and broadcaster. He is a former radio host and political analyst for KIRO and Air America Radio, and has hosted his own daily three-hour show with them. Reagan has also been a contributor to MS NOW.

His progressive views contrast with those of his conservative father, President Ronald Reagan. As a lifelong supporter of progressive and Democratic Party causes, he has been an outspoken critic of the 21st century Republican Party, having been a prominent opponent of George W. Bush and later stating that his father would be "ashamed" over the influence of Donald Trump in the Republican Party.

== Early life and education ==
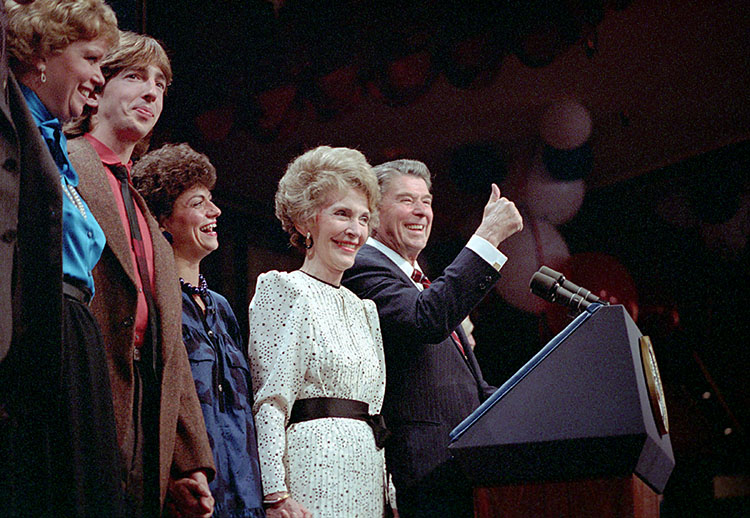
Reagan (second from left) attending the celebrations of his father's re-election at The Century Plaza Hotel in Los Angeles, California, 1984

Reagan was born on May 20, 1958, at Cedars-Sinai Medical Center in Los Angeles. He is the biological son of Ronald Reagan and his second wife, Nancy Davis Reagan. The family lived in Sacramento while his father was governor, from 1967 to 1975. His sister, Patti Davis, is five and a half years older. His older adoptive brother, Michael Reagan, adopted as an infant by Ronald Reagan and his first wife, Jane Wyman, was 13 years older. He also had two half-sisters born to Reagan and Wyman, Maureen Reagan (1941–2001) and Christine Reagan, who was born prematurely on June 26, 1947, and died the same day.

Ron Reagan undertook a different philosophical and political path from his father at an early age. At 12, he told his parents he would not be going to church anymore because he was an atheist.

Reagan attended and was expelled from The Webb School of California. He commented:

They [the school administration] thought I was a bad influence on the other kids. As I recall, the immediate reason was I went to a dance at a neighboring girl's school in a classmate's car. This was an infraction. They had been looking for an excuse. I didn't get caught at anything.

Reagan dropped out of Yale University in 1976 after one semester to become a ballet dancer. He joined the Joffrey Ballet in pursuit of his lifelong dream and participated in the Joffrey II Dancers, a troupe for beginning dancers, where he was mentored by Sally Brayley. Time wrote in 1980: "It is widely known that Ron's parents have not managed to see a single ballet performance of their son, who is clearly very good, having been selected to the Joffrey second company, and is their son nonetheless. Ron talks of his parents with much affection. But these absences are strange and go back a ways." The parent Reagans went to see Ron perform at the Lisner Auditorium on Monday, May 18, 1981. The elder Reagan commented in his White House diary on this day that Ron's performance was "darn good" and reminiscent of Fred Astaire.

Reagan, who was 22 and married by the time his father took office, never lived in the White House. He dropped his Secret Service protection during his father's second term in office as president. Excerpts from his father's diary, which were made public, detail Ronald Reagan's conflicts with his daughter Patti and his son Ron, in 1984 and 1987, respectively, over the presidents' children's refusal to cooperate with and desire to renounce Secret Service protection.

== Career ==
In February 1986, Reagan hosted an episode of Saturday Night Live.

Reagan became more politically active after his father left the White House in 1989. In contrast to his father, the younger Reagan's views were unabashedly liberal. In a 2009 Vanity Fair interview, Ron said that he did not speak out politically during his father's term because the press "never cared about my opinions as such, only as they related to him", adding he did not want to create the impression that he and his father were on bad terms because of political differences. In 1991, Reagan hosted The Ron Reagan Show, a syndicated late-night talk show addressing political issues of the day, which was canceled after a brief run since it was unable to compete with the higher ratings of The Arsenio Hall Show, The Tonight Show Starring Johnny Carson, and Nightline.

Reagan has worked in recent years as a magazine journalist and has hosted talk shows on cable TV networks such as the Animal Planet network. In Britain, he is best known for having co-presented Record Breakers (based on The Guinness Book of Records) for the BBC. Reagan presented a report from the United States each week.

He has served on the board of the Creative Coalition, an organization founded in 1989 by a group that included Susan Sarandon and Christopher Reeve, to politically mobilize entertainers and artists, generally for First Amendment rights and causes such as arts advocacy and public education. From February to December 2005, Reagan co-hosted the talk show Connected: Coast to Coast with Monica Crowley on MSNBC.

Until its demise in 2010, Air America Media aired The Ron Reagan Show. The program made its debut on September 8, 2008.

In 2011, he published My Father at 100: A Memoir. In interviews promoting the book, Reagan described noticing his father was having certain mental lapses which, in hindsight, caused the younger Reagan to speculate subsequently that his father may have already been in the early stages of Alzheimer's disease while still in office. The assertion was criticized by many, including his brother, Michael Reagan. Ron Reagan subsequently clarified that he did not feel the lapses were evidence of "dementia."

== Political activities ==
Reagan is not a member of a political party, but votes Democratic. In July 2004, Reagan spoke at the Democratic National Convention about his support for lifting Bush's restrictions on federally funded embryonic stem cell research, from which he expected a cure or new treatments for Alzheimer's disease, of which his father had recently died. "There are those who would stand in the way of this remarkable future, who would deny the federal funding so crucial to basic research. A few of these folks, needless to say, are just grinding a political axe and they should be ashamed of themselves," Ron Reagan said of the restrictions. "We can choose between the future and the past, between reason and ignorance, between true compassion and mere ideology." Reagan's mother Nancy also supported this position.

In September 2004, he told the Sunday Herald newspaper that the George W. Bush Administration had "cheated to get into the White House. It's not something Americans ever want to think about their government. My sense of these people is that they don't have any respect for the public at large. They have a revolutionary mindset. I think they feel that anything they can do to prevail — lie, cheat, whatever — is justified by their revolutionary aims" and that he feared Bush was "hijacking" his father's reputation.

Reagan later wrote the essay "The Case Against George W. Bush by Ron Reagan" for Esquire. He voted for Democratic candidate John Kerry in the 2004 presidential election. Reagan endorsed Senator Barack Obama of Illinois for president in the 2008 presidential election. In November 2015, Reagan endorsed Vermont Senator Bernie Sanders for the Democratic Party nomination in the 2016 Democratic Party primaries.

In early 2020, Reagan stated his father would have opposed Donald Trump, remarking to The Daily Beast that "The Republican Party at this point, for a whole host of reasons to do with Donald Trump, is an entirely illegitimate political party just made up of a bunch of sycophantic traitors mouthing Kremlin propaganda to defend this squalid little man who is occupying the White House," Reagan said. "This is a dying party. They either have to remake themselves entirely or they will disappear eventually. Within a decade the Republican Party will be a minor fringe group if it continues going this way. My father would have been ashamed of this Republican Party. He would have been embarrassed and ashamed that a president of the United States was as incompetent and traitorous as the man occupying the White House now. He’s a disgrace to the office of the presidency."

== Personal life ==
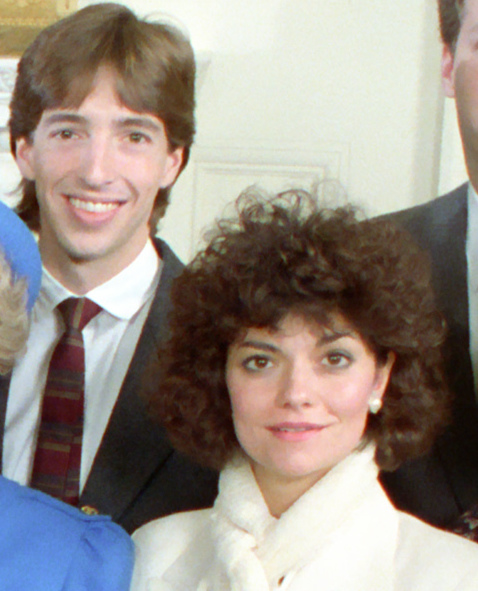
Reagan with his wife Doria in 1985

Reagan lives in Seattle. He married Doria Palmieri, a clinical psychologist, in 1980. She died in 2014 from neuromuscular disease. He married Federica Basagni in 2018.

=== Religious views ===
Reagan stated in a 2004 New York Times interview that he did not claim any religion, but that his sympathies were with Buddhism and his wife was a Buddhist. In a June 23, 2004, interview on CNN show Larry King Live, while discussing reasons why he declined to run for political office, Ron Reagan stated "I'm an atheist [...] I can't be elected to anything because polls all say that people won't elect an atheist."

In February 2010, he was named to the Freedom From Religion Foundation's Honorary Board of distinguished achievers. In May 2014, Reagan appeared in an advertisement for broadcast on Comedy Central for the Freedom From Religion Foundation in which he declared himself "an unabashed atheist" who is "not afraid of burning in Hell." The ad received renewed attention in October 2019 when it aired on CNN during the fourth 2020 Democratic Presidential Debate. The ad was also run during the CNN Democratic debates in January and March 2020.

== See also ==
- List of children of presidents of the United States
