= Paul Grilley =

American teacher of modern yoga (born 1958)

- Born: November 11, 1958 (age 67)
- Occupation: Yoga teacher
- Known for: Yin Yoga
- Spouses: Patti Davis (m. 1984; div. 1990): Suzee Grilley

Paul Grilley (born November 11, 1958) is an American teacher of modern yoga known for helping, along with Sarah Powers, to develop the slow-paced style, Yin Yoga. He and his wife Suzee Grilley train teachers in Yin Yoga.

== Education ==
Paul Grilley grew up in Martin City, Montana and is a graduate of Columbia Falls High School in Columbia Falls, Montana. He began to practise yoga in 1979, starting to study anatomy in Montana that same year. In 1982 he went on to study anatomy and kinesiology at the University of California, Los Angeles. He gained his master's degree at St John's College, Santa Fe in 2000. He was awarded an honorary Ph.D. by the California Institute for Human Science for his work on the relevance of fascia, the sheets of connective tissue that hold the body together, to the practice of yoga asanas.

== Career ==
Grilley studied the slow-paced, less aggressive form of modern yoga called Yin Yoga under its creator, Paulie Zink, and later assisted with its development.

He taught yoga to Sarah Powers, who devised the name "Yin Yoga" and went on to develop her own variant of it, Insight Yoga. Grilley had until then described the form as "Taoist Yoga". He teaches Yin Yoga and trains yoga teachers with his wife Suzee Grilley. Their Yin Yoga curriculum covers the human anatomy of bones and muscles as well as seven asanas that they describe as archetypal, yoga and meditation. He serves as a master teacher at Pranamaya. From his knowledge of anatomy, Grilley states that it is not possible for everyone to do all asanas, because of variations in the shapes of specific bones; for example, some people have a much longer neck on the femur (thigh bone) than others, giving them, he argues, greater freedom of movement in the hip joint.

Grilley has stated that Yin Yoga is not a franchise or hybrid like Aqua Yoga or Disco Yoga, and the use of the term is not restricted by copyright or trademark; instead, it is an additional way of practising.

He has been interviewed and featured in magazines including Yoga Journal and Elephant Journal, and in chapters of books such as Victoria Bailey's 2012 Sharing Sadhana: Bailey describes him as both spiritual, as seen in his DVD on Chakra Theory and Meditation, and knowledgeable about the anatomical basis of yoga.

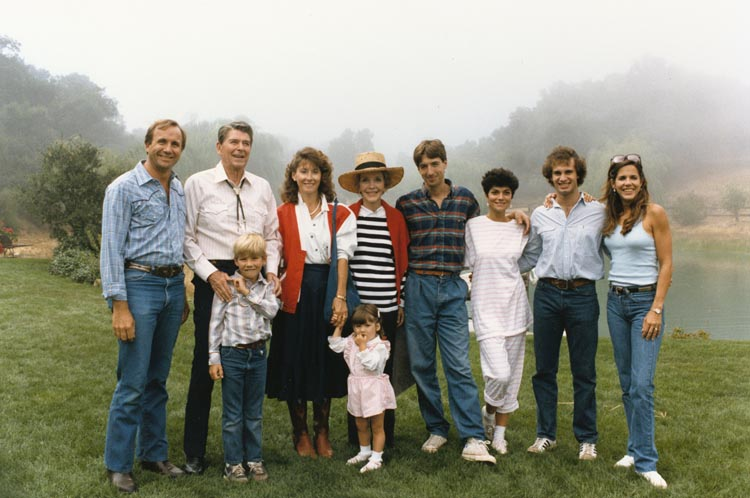
Grilley and his first wife Patti Davis (at right) with the Reagan family at Rancho Del Cielo, 1985. Courtesy Ronald Reagan Library

== Personal life ==
In 1984, Grilley married Patti Davis, daughter of US president Ronald Reagan. They divorced in 1990. He then married Suzee Grilley (born 1959); she is a Registered Yoga Teacher who has also taught Capoeira and modern dance. They live in Ashland, Oregon.

== Works ==
- Anatomy for Yoga with Paul Grilley (DVD). Pranamaya. 2004. ISBN 978-1585651689. OCLC 56924405.
- Yin Yoga: Principles and Practice. Ashland, Oregon: White Cloud Press. 2012. ISBN 9781935952701.
- A Yogi's Guide to Chakra Meditation. Cardinal. 2019. ISBN 978-1-7335839-0-9. OCLC 1089967309.
