= Michael Reagan =

American television personality and journalist (1945–2026)

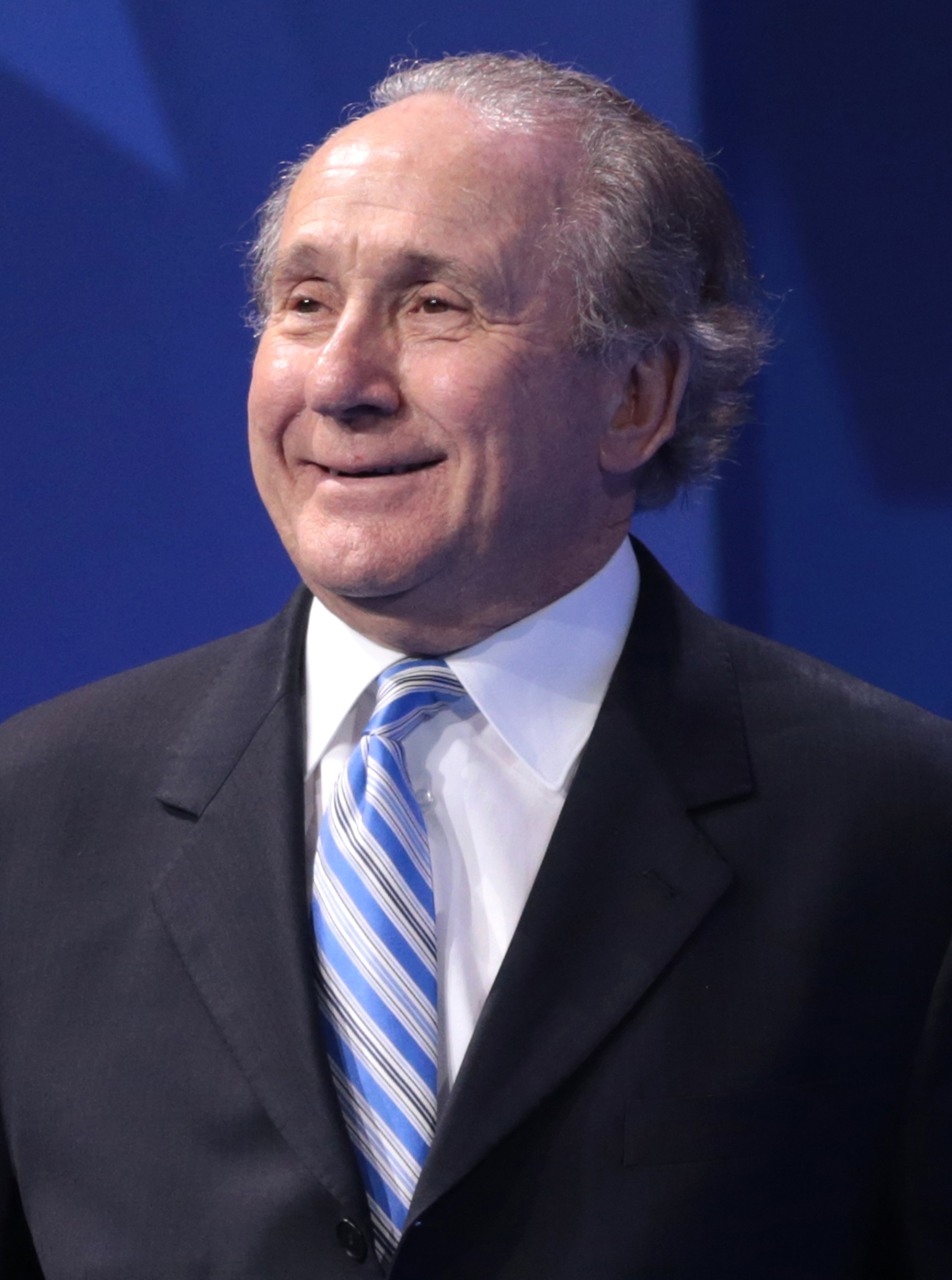
- Reagan in 2017
- Born: John Charles Flaugher; March 18, 1945; Los Angeles, California, U.S.
- Died: January 4, 2026 (aged 80); Los Angeles, California, U.S.
- Occupations: Radio talk show host, writer
- Employer: Newsmax
- Political party: Republican
- Spouses: Pamela Gail Putnam (m. 1971; div. 1972); Colleen Sterns (m. 1975)
- Children: 2
- Relatives: Ronald Reagan (adoptive father); Jane Wyman (adoptive mother); Maureen Reagan (adoptive sister); Patti Davis (adoptive half sister); Ron Reagan (adoptive half brother); Nancy Reagan (stepmother)

Michael Edward Reagan (born John Charles Flaugher; March 18, 1945 – January 4, 2026) was an American conservative political commentator, Republican Party strategist and radio talk show host. He was the adopted son of former U.S. president Ronald Reagan and his first wife, actress Jane Wyman. He worked as a columnist for Newsmax.

== Early life ==
Michael Edward Reagan was born John Charles Flaugher at Hollywood Presbyterian Medical Center in Los Angeles, on March 18, 1945, to Essie Irene Flaugher (October 18, 1916 – December 26, 1985), an unmarried woman from Kentucky who became pregnant through a relationship with John Bourgholtzer (1918–1993), a U.S. Army corporal. Flaugher was adopted by Ronald Reagan and Jane Wyman shortly after his birth.

Reagan was expelled from Loyola High School after a short period at the school, and in 1964 he graduated from the Judson School, a boarding school outside of Scottsdale, Arizona. He attended Arizona State University for less than one semester and Los Angeles Valley College but never graduated.

In 1965, the FBI warned Ronald Reagan that in the course of an organized crime investigation it had discovered that Michael was associated with the son of crime boss Joseph Bonanno, which would have become a campaign issue had it been publicly known. Reagan thanked the FBI and said he would tell his son to discreetly discontinue the association.

== Careers ==
=== Salesman ===
Sometime before September 1970, Reagan was working as a salesman for the clothing company Hart, Schaffner, & Marx. He then became a director of special events catering at Michaelson Food Service Company in Los Angeles. In 1981, Reagan was hired as a salesman for Industrial Circuits, a circuit board company owned by Robert Herring Sr.

=== Actor ===
Reagan had small roles in movies and television shows beginning in 1985, including Falcon Crest, which starred his mother, Jane Wyman.

=== Television ===
In 1987, Reagan served as the host for the first season of the television game show Lingo.

=== Radio ===
His work in talk radio started in the Southern California local market as a guest host for radio commentator Michael Jackson's talk radio show slot on KABC in Los Angeles. After this beginning, he landed a talk show spot on KSDO radio in San Diego.

Reagan also hosted The Michael Reagan Show nationwide for most of the 2000s. The show was variously syndicated on Premiere Networks and Radio America. After that, he focused on public speaking about his father.

=== Author ===
In 1988, he wrote, with Joe Hyams, an autobiography, Michael Reagan: On the Outside Looking In. He also wrote that he was sexually abused at the age of seven by a camp counselor.

In 2005, he wrote Twice Adopted about his feelings of rejection being adopted, parents divorcing and becoming a born-again Christian.

== Political commentary ==
=== Same-sex marriage ===
In April 2013, in a syndicated column, Reagan accused American churches of not fighting hard enough to block same-sex marriage. He wrote that, in regard to arguments supporting gay marriage, similar arguments could be used to support polygamy, bestiality, and murder. As he wrote: "There is also a very slippery slope leading to other alternative relationships and the unconstitutionality of any law based on morality. Think about polygamy, bestiality, and perhaps even murder."

=== Call for the execution of Mark Dice ===
In June 2008, Mark Dice launched a campaign urging people to send letters and DVDs to US troops stationed in Iraq which support the theory that the September 11 attacks were an "inside job". "Operation Inform the Soldiers", as Dice has called it, prompted Reagan to comment that Dice should be executed for treason. Fairness and Accuracy in Reporting, a liberal/progressive media criticism organization, asked Radio America at the time to explain whether it permits "its hosts to call for murder on the air".

=== Support for profiling ===
Reagan spoke out in support of profiling in October 2014. In a piece called Profile or Die, he wrote that it would be left to citizens to defend themselves if there were an attack against them by terrorists such as the Islamic State.

=== Donald Trump ===
In 2016, Reagan said he would not vote for Trump and endorsed Ted Cruz in the primary. Later he said via X (formerly Twitter) that he voted for Trump in 2020 and 2024 elections. In 2025, he defended the Trump tariffs.

=== Call for civil war ===
On September 1, 2025, Minnesota governor Tim Walz indirectly referred to a rumor that president Donald Trump had died. Three days later, Reagan's response appeared in a Cagle column, which began, "Maybe we do need a Civil War 2.0 – with guns. Our politics has become so partisan and so nasty, using guns to settle our national political differences may soon end up being the only solution."

== Legal problems ==
In 1981, Reagan was accused of felony violations of California securities laws in court documents. The Los Angeles County District Attorney alleged that Reagan had baited investors into unlawful stock arrangements, and sold stocks despite the fact that he was not legally permitted to do so. The D.A.'s office investigated allegations that Reagan improperly spent money invested by others in a company, Agricultural Energy Resources, he operated out of his house in a venture to develop the potential of gasohol, a combination of alcohol and gasoline. Investigators said they were also checking whether he had spent up to $17,500 of investors' money for his living expenses. The district attorney's office cleared Reagan of both charges later that year.

On September 20, 2012, Reagan, Tim Kelly and Jay Hoffman were sued by a fellow partner for allegedly withholding the partner's interest in an e-mail business built around the Reagan.com domain name. In 2015, a Los Angeles Superior Court jury found Reagan liable for conversion and breach of fiduciary duty. Reagan and his business partners were ordered to pay $662,500 each in damages.

== Personal life and death ==
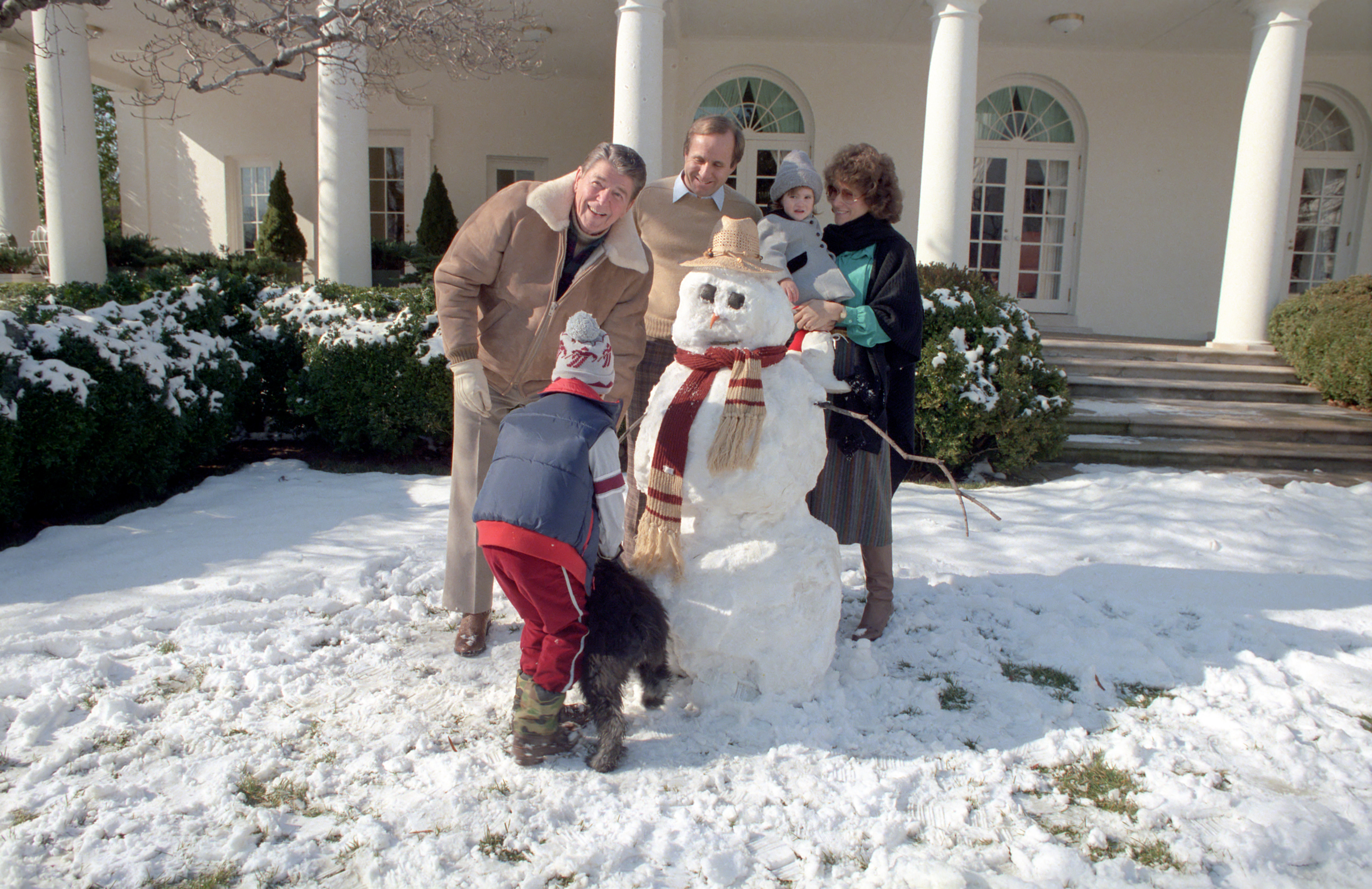
The Reagans building snowmen at the White House in 1985

In June 1971, Reagan married Pamela Gail Putnam (born 1952), daughter of Duane Putnam, former Atlanta Falcons football line coach. The couple divorced in 1972.

Reagan married Colleen Sterns, an interior decorator, in 1975 at The Church on the Way. They had two children, Cameron and Ashley. Reagan and his wife lived in the Toluca Lake area of Los Angeles.

In January 2011, he called his adoptive brother Ron Reagan, the biological son of Ronald Reagan and his second wife, Nancy Reagan, "an embarrassment" for speculating in a memoir that their father suffered from Alzheimer's disease while president.

Michael and his sister Maureen, unlike their more liberal siblings Patti and Ron, agreed more with their father's conservative political views.

Reagan had a history of having, at times, a strained relationship with both his adoptive parents (Jane Wyman and Ronald Reagan) as well as with his stepmother, Nancy Reagan. Reagan, however, gave a eulogy at his father's funeral in 2004. He did not attend the funeral of Nancy Reagan, in 2016, although at that time he was on a business trip in Asia, and he tweeted his condolences, expressing his sadness at her death.

Reagan died of cancer in Los Angeles, on January 4, 2026, at the age of 80. His funeral was held at St. Mel Parish in Woodland Hills, California, with his reception and interment being private.
