= Maureen Reagan =

American political activist (1941–2001)

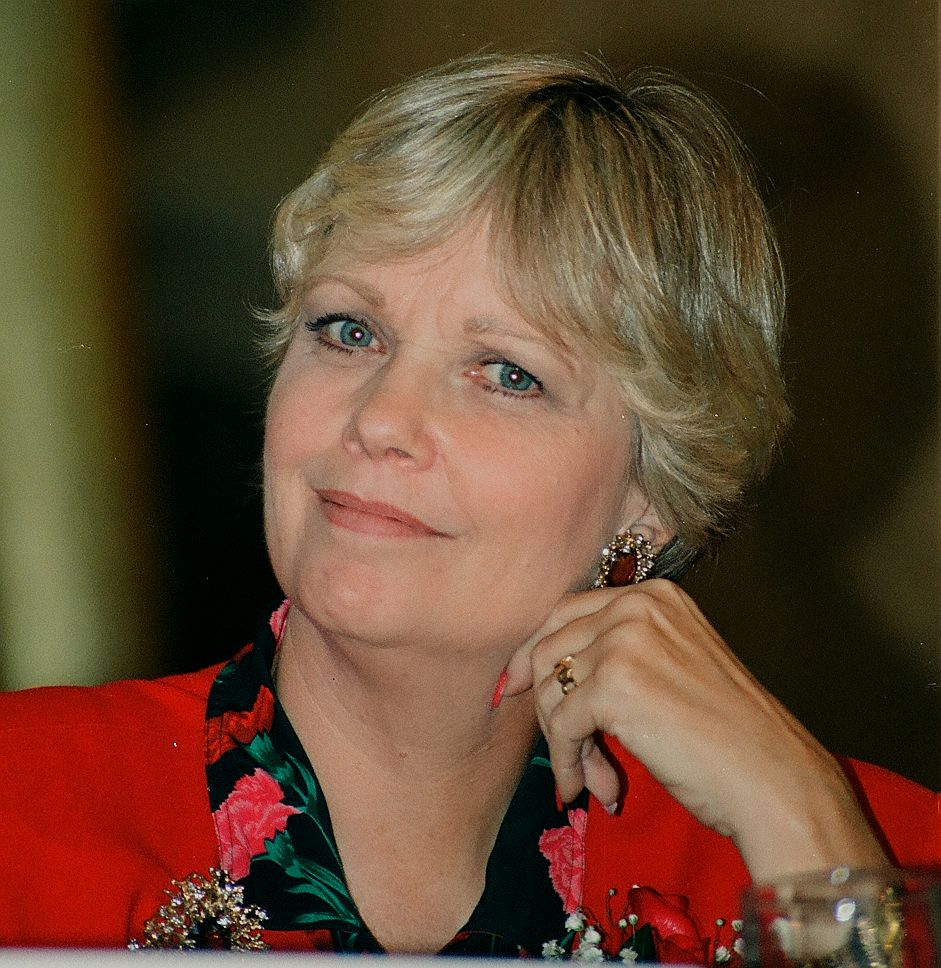
- Reagan in 1995

Co-Chair of the Republican National Committee
- In office January, 1987 – January, 1989
- Leader: Frank Fahrenkopf
- Preceded by: Betty Heitman

Personal details
- Born: January 4, 1941 Los Angeles, California, U.S.
- Died: August 8, 2001 (aged 60) Granite Bay, California, U.S.
- Resting place: Calvary Catholic Cemetery and Mausoleum, Sacramento, California, U.S.
- Party: Republican
- Spouses: John Filippone (m. 1961; div. 1962); David Sills (m. 1964; div. 1967); Dennis C. Revell (m. 1981)
- Children: 1
- Parents: Ronald Reagan (father); Jane Wyman (mother)
- Relatives: Michael Reagan (brother); Patti Davis (half-sister); Ron Reagan (half-brother)

Maureen Elizabeth Reagan (January 4, 1941 – August 8, 2001) was an American political activist and the first child of U.S. president Ronald Reagan and his first wife, actress Jane Wyman.

== Early life ==
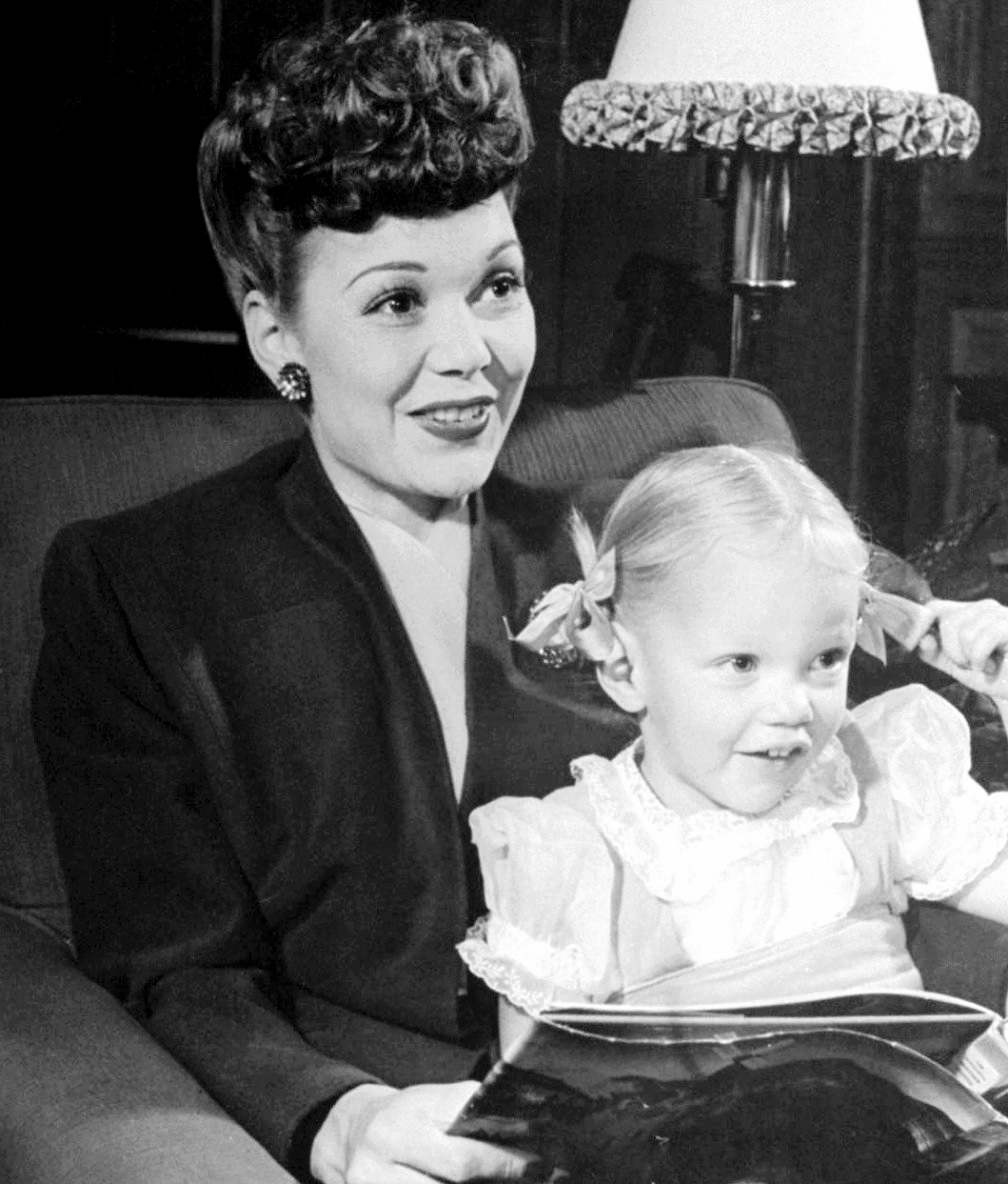
Reagan with her mother, Jane Wyman (1944)

Reagan was born January 4, 1941, in Los Angeles, where she was raised. She graduated from Marymount Secondary School, Tarrytown, New York, in 1958 and briefly attended Marymount University in Virginia. She worked for Walker & Dunlop and entered the Miss Washington competition in 1959.

Her adoptive younger brother was Michael Reagan and her half-siblings were Patti Davis and Ron Reagan, from her father's second marriage (to Nancy Reagan). Her parents also had another daughter, Christine, who was born prematurely and died shortly after birth. Reagan is a descendant of the American colonial Robert Coe.

=== Acting career ===
Reagan pursued a career in acting in her youth, appearing in films such as Kissin' Cousins (1964) in which she featured alongside Elvis Presley. She played Mrs. Moss on The Love Boat S2 E6 "Ship of Ghouls" opposite Vincent Price as The Amazing Alonzo. The episode aired on 10/27/1978.

== Political activities ==
In the 1960s, Reagan would serve as the first President of the Walter Knott Republican Women's Club.

Reagan was the first son or daughter of a U.S. president to be elected co-chair of the Republican National Committee. However, both of her attempts at election to political office ended in defeat. She ran unsuccessfully for the United States Senate from California in 1982 (which was eventually won by Pete Wilson) and in 1992 for California's 36th congressional district.

In 1983, she was given the title of Special Consultant to the Republican National Committee, serving as committee advisor on women's issues, and took up some residency at the family quarters of the White House. During the 1980s she also served as a member of California's World Trade Organization. In 1985, she would lead the United States delegation to the 1985 United Nations Decade for Women Conference in Nairobi, Kenya, and in early 1986 became the U.S. representative to the United Nations Commission on the Status of Women. In January 1987, Reagan would be elected co-chairman of the Republican Party, and served in this role until 1989. Through this post, Reagan would help organize the 1988 Republican National Convention. In 1989, Reagan began serving as the chairwoman of the Republican Women's Political Action League.

Although they maintained a united front, Maureen Reagan differed from her father on several key issues. Although reared Roman Catholic following her mother's conversion, she was pro-choice on abortion. She also held the belief that Oliver North should have been court-martialed.

After her father announced his diagnosis of Alzheimer's disease in 1994, Maureen Reagan became a member of the Alzheimer's Association board of directors and served as the group's spokeswoman. While hospitalized for melanoma cancer towards the end of her life, Maureen was only floors away from her father who had suffered a severe fall.

== Personal life ==
In 1960, Maureen's by-then divorced parents became concerned about her. Ronald Reagan used his connections at the FBI − established during his work as an anti-communist informant − to request the agency to investigate her romantic life. The agency did so on condition that the FBI not be cited as a source, and reported that she was living with an older, married man who was a police officer.

Maureen Reagan was married three times:

- John Filippone, a policeman; they were married in 1961 and divorced the following year. In her autobiography, Maureen Reagan revealed that Filippone was abusive.
- David G. Sills, a lawyer and Marine Corps officer; they married on February 28, 1964; the couple divorced in 1967. He would later go on to become Mayor of Irvine, California and Presiding Justice of the California Court of Appeal for the 4th District.
- Dennis C. Revell, CEO of Revell Communications (a national public relations/public affairs firm), whom she married on April 25, 1981. She and Revell adopted one daughter, Margaret "Rita" Mirembe Revell, who was born in Uganda. The Revells became Rita's guardians in 1994. They adopted her in 2001. Rita was the beneficiary of a private bill to facilitate her adoption as Maureen and Dennis Revell were unable to complete the necessary paperwork and other requirements by the Ugandan government, including a personal visitation to that country, due, in large part, to Maureen Reagan Revell's terminal cancer.

Together with her adopted brother Michael, Maureen, unlike her more liberal half-siblings Patti and Ron, was the only of Ronald Reagan's children who was a Republican and who agreed more with her father's conservative political views. In 2004, the San Francisco Chronicle described Maureen as the child whom Reagan was "closest -- politically and personally - - with." However, she would differ from her father when it came to support for women's rights issues such as the Equal Rights Amendment and abortion rights.

== Death ==
In 1996, Reagan was diagnosed with melanoma skin cancer. She died in Granite Bay, California, on August 8, 2001, aged 60, from melanoma. She is interred at Calvary Catholic Cemetery and Mausoleum in Sacramento, California.

Reagan volunteered with actor David Hyde Pierce, of TV's Frasier, at the Alzheimer's Association. At her funeral on August 19, 2001, Pierce spoke to the mourners at the Cathedral of the Blessed Sacrament in Sacramento, and recalled his friend's attitude to her illness. "When she was given lemons, she did not make lemonade. She took the lemons, threw them back and said, 'Oh, no you don't.'"
