= Patti Davis =

American actress and author (born 1952)

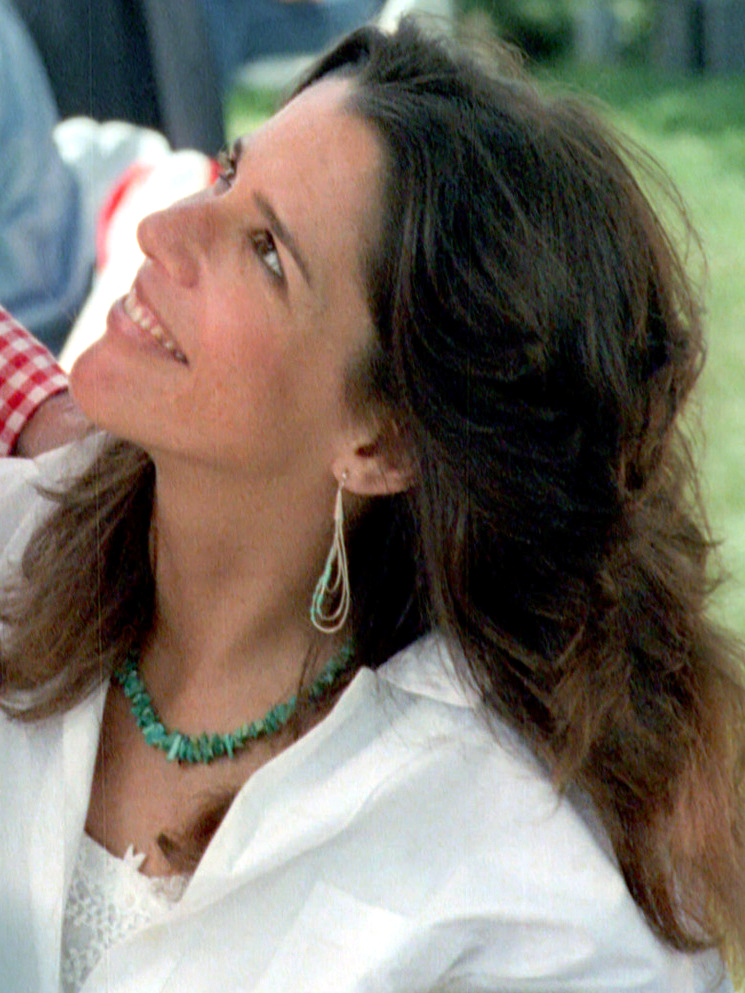
- Davis in 1983
- Born: Patricia Ann Reagan; October 21, 1952 (age 73); Los Angeles, California, U.S.
- Other name: Patti Reagan
- Occupations: Actress; author
- Political party: Democratic
- Spouse: Paul Grilley (m. 1984; div. 1990)
- Partner: Bernie Leadon
- Parents: Ronald Reagan; Nancy Reagan
- Relatives: Ron Reagan (brother); Maureen Reagan (half-sister); Michael Reagan (adopted brother)

Patricia Ann Davis (née Reagan; born October 21, 1952) is an American actress and author. She is the daughter of U.S. president Ronald Reagan and his second wife, Nancy Reagan.

== Early life and education ==
Patricia Ann Reagan was born to Ronald and Nancy Reagan on October 21, 1952, at Cedars-Sinai Medical Center in Los Angeles, California. She is the older sister of Ron Reagan, and the younger adoptive half-sister of the late Michael Reagan as well as half-sister of the late Maureen Reagan. She went to grade school at the John Thomas Dye School in Bel Air, and graduated from the Orme School of Arizona in 1970. She matriculated at Northwestern University, where she studied creative writing and drama. She then attended the University of Southern California for two years. She changed her last name to her mother's maiden adopted name, Davis, in an effort to have an independent career. She was active in the anti-nuclear movement before her father was elected president, and continued her activism through his term, stirring controversy and creating strife in the family. She has been a critic of the Republican Party, with which she has never been affiliated.

== Career ==
In the early 1980s, Davis acted in a few television shows before getting her first publishing deal. In 1986, she published her first novel, Home Front. She used elements of her own life to create a fictional story. The book became controversial, and she was widely criticized. Following her second novel Deadfall, she wrote an autobiography called The Way I See It, in which she revealed many family dramas and secrets. She has since spoken publicly about how she regrets the form, but not the content, of the critique she presented in the book.

In the July 1994 issue of Playboy, Davis posed for the magazine with a full frontal pictorial. This issue of the magazine also displayed Davis on its front cover. This issue is considered to be one of the magazine's most controversial covers. Davis has posed for other magazines such as More in 2011. Playboy also issued a VHS tape as a complement to the 1994 issue.

When her father was diagnosed with Alzheimer's disease, she began writing The Long Goodbye, which was published in 2004. During that time, she began writing for magazines and newspapers, including The New York Times, Newsweek and Time. Her original screenplay, Spring Thaw, became the 2007 Hallmark Channel movie Sacrifices of the Heart, starring Melissa Gilbert and Ken Howard.

== Personal life ==
In 1969, Davis applied to Ohio University and Northwestern to study journalism, and enrolled in the latter.

In the 1970s, she lived with Eagles guitarist Bernie Leadon. By this time, her mother had disowned her for living with Leadon as an unmarried couple. Together, Davis and Leadon co-wrote the song "I Wish You Peace", which appeared on Eagles album One of These Nights.

In the 1980s, she dated actor Timothy Hutton, and later had a two-year relationship with actor Peter Strauss.

In 2014, Davis expressed her frustration about having the Secret Service monitoring her dates, as they had time limits on evening dates, and monitored her and her partners' actions together. She said that this situation was part of why she rushed into her relationship with her future husband, Paul Grilley. In 1984, she married Grilley, a yoga instructor and one of the founders of Yin Yoga. They divorced in 1990, without children. As of January 2026, Davis has never remarried.

Davis is a vegetarian, and has disagreed with laws that outlaw the use of marijuana.

She has no children.

In 2011, she launched "Beyond Alzheimer's" at UCLA, which she still runs.

In a September 2018, op-ed for the Washington Post, Davis wrote that she had been sexually assaulted nearly 40 years earlier by a studio executive. The op-ed was released the same week Christine Blasey Ford recounted an alleged sexual assault by Supreme Court nominee Brett Kavanaugh. Davis released the piece in support of Blasey Ford when she had been criticized for not remembering details of the alleged assault.

After the synagogue shooting in Pittsburgh in October 2018, Davis penned an op-ed in the Washington Post, accused President Donald Trump of failing to provide solace to the nation in times of tragedy. She wrote, in part: "This president will never offer comfort, compassion or empathy to a grieving nation. It's not in him. When questioned after a tragedy, he will always be glib and inappropriate. So I have a wild suggestion: Let's stop asking him. His words are only salt in our wounds". In August 2019, Davis wrote an editorial in the Washington Post condemning denigrating comments her father had made in jest about black Africans at the United Nations in a 1971 phone conversation with President Richard Nixon, which Nixon had taped. The tapes were publicly released the day prior. In the editorial, Davis wrote: "There is no defense, no rationalization, no suitable explanation for what my father said on that taped phone conversation."

In October 2021, she expressed her disdain for John Hinckley Jr.'s being fully released following the assassination attempt of her father in 1981, a view that contrasted with that of Michael Reagan, the adopted son of President Reagan and his first wife, Jane Wyman, who expressed forgiveness for Hinckley.

After the attempted assassination of Donald Trump, she voiced disdain for political violence and related the event to her own father's experience being shot and the emotional toll it took on her family.

== Filmography ==
=== Film ===
Year	Title	Role	Notes
1983	Curse of the Pink Panther	Michelle Chauvin	
1985	Cocaine Wars	Rosita	
1989	Tango & Cash	Reporter	
1993	The Last Party	—N/a	Documentary

=== Television ===
Year	Title	Role	Notes
1979, 1986	The Love Boat	Brenda / Cindy	2 episodes
1979	CHiPs	Receptionist	Episode: "The Watch Commander"
1980	Fantasy Island	Charmain	Episode: "My Fair Pharaoh/The Power"
1980	Vegas	Connie / Beth	2 episodes
1981	Nero Wolfe	Dana Groves	Episode: "Gambit"
1981	For Ladies Only	Sandy Green	Television film
1982	Hart to Hart	Laura Hampel	Episode: "To Coin a Hart"
1982	Romance Theatre	Jean	5 episodes
1983	Night Partners	Janice Tyler	Television film
1983	Trapper John, M.D.	Janet Taylor	Episode: "All About Everett"
1983, 1985	Simon & Simon	Beth Carlisle / Diana	2 episodes

== Bibliography ==
- Home Front. Crown, 1986 ISBN 0-517-55952-8. (quasi-novel)
- Deadfall. Crown, 1989. ISBN 0-517-57405-5. (novel)
- A House of Secrets. Carol, 1991. ISBN 1-55972-082-4. (quasi-novel)
- The Way I See It: An Autobiography. Putnam, 1992. ISBN 0-399-13748-3.
- Bondage. Simon & Schuster, 1994. ISBN 0-671-86953-1. (novel)
- Angels Don't Die: My Father's Gift of Faith. Harper Collins, 1995. ISBN 0-06-017324-6.
- The Long Goodbye. Knopf, 2004. ISBN 0-679-45092-0.
- Two Cats and the Woman They Own. Chronicle Books, 2006. ISBN 0-8118-5166-4.
- The Lives Our Mothers Leave Us. Hay House, 2009. ISBN 1401921620.
- Till Human Voices Wake Us. CreateSpace, KDP, 2013. ISBN 1483990044. (novel)
- The Blue Hour. CreateSpace, KDP, 2013. ISBN 1492144479. (novel)
- The Wit and Wisdom of Gracie. Huqua Press, 2014. ISBN 0-983812055
- The Earth Breaks in Colors. Huqua Press, 2014. ISBN 0-990696642 (novel)
