= Migratory Bird Conservation Act =

- Other short titles: Norbeck-Andresen Act
- Long title: An Act To more effectively meet the obligations of the United States under the migratory bird treaty with Great Britain...
- Enacted by: the 70th United States Congress
- Effective: February 18, 1929

Citations
- Public law: Public Law 70-770
- Statutes at Large: 45 Stat. 1222

Legislative history
- Introduced in the Senate as S. 1271 by R‑SD Peter Norbeckth; Committee consideration by Senate Committee on Agriculture and Forestry; Signed into law by President Calvin Coolidge on February 18, 1929

Major amendments
- Migratory Bird Hunting and Conservation Stamp Act (1934)

The Migratory Bird Conservation Act of 1929 (45 Stat. 1222) of February 18, 1929, (also known as the "Norbeck-Andresen Act") created the United States Migratory Bird Conservation Commission (MBCC) to consider and approve any areas of land and/or water recommended by the Secretary of the Interior for purchase or rental by the U.S. Fish and Wildlife Service and to fix the price or prices at which such areas may be purchased or rented.

The Commission considered the establishment of new waterfowl refuges. While perhaps unimportant because of the Great Depression, the act was an important step for the conservation movement.

== See also ==
- Migratory Bird Treaty Act
