= Yin Yoga =

Slow-paced school of modern yoga as exercise

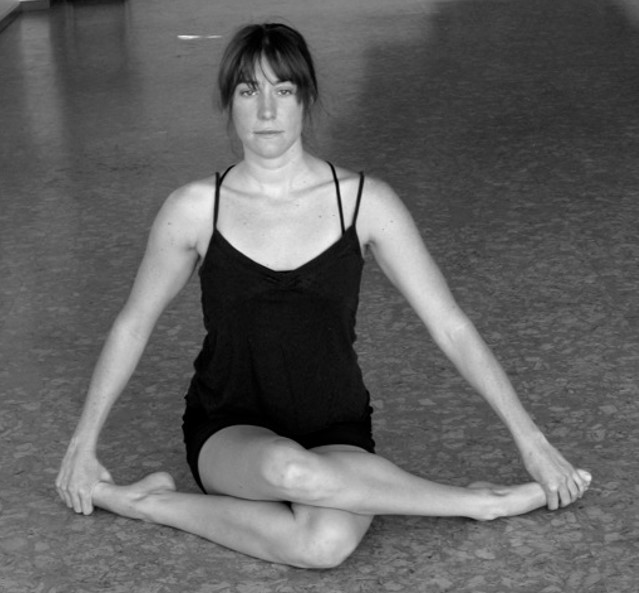
Shoelace pose, a classic asana of Yin Yoga, based on but not identical to the traditional Gomukhasana

Yin Yoga is a slow-paced style of yoga (as exercise), incorporating principles of traditional Chinese medicine, with asanas (postures) that are held for longer periods of time than in other yoga styles. Advanced practitioners may stay in one asana for five minutes or more. As conceptualized in the Taoist and Dharmic traditions, the sequences of postures are meant to stimulate the channels of the subtle body, known as meridians in Chinese medicine and as nadis in Hatha yoga.

Yin Yoga poses apply moderate stress to the connective tissues of the body—the tendons, fasciae, and ligaments—intending to increase circulation in the joints and improve flexibility. A more meditative approach to yoga, its goals are awareness of inner silence, and bringing to light a universal, interconnecting quality.

Yin Yoga was founded by martial arts expert and Taoist yoga teacher Paulie Zink in the late 1970s, and officially named as such by Sarah Powers. Yin Yoga is taught worldwide and is encouraged by its teachers Paul Grilley, Sarah Powers, and Bernie Clark. As taught by Grilley, Powers, and Clark, it is not intended as a complete practice in itself, but as a complement to more active forms of yoga and exercise. Zink's approach includes the full range of Taoist yoga, focusing on animalistic movements and the balancing of Yin and Yang energies.

== Roots in India and China ==
Long-held postures have been used both in India's Hatha yoga and in China's daoyin. For example, B. K. S. Iyengar recommended holding Supta Virasana (reclining hero pose) for 10–15 minutes. Long-held stretches are similarly recommended in Western physical disciplines, such as gymnastics and ballet, to increase flexibility. Tao yin included poses like those of Yin Yoga in the system of Neidan (internal alchemy), intended to improve health and longevity. Taoist priests taught long-held poses, along with breathing techniques, to Kung Fu practitioners beginning 2000 years ago, to help them fully develop their martial arts skills.

== History ==
=== Paulie Zink ===
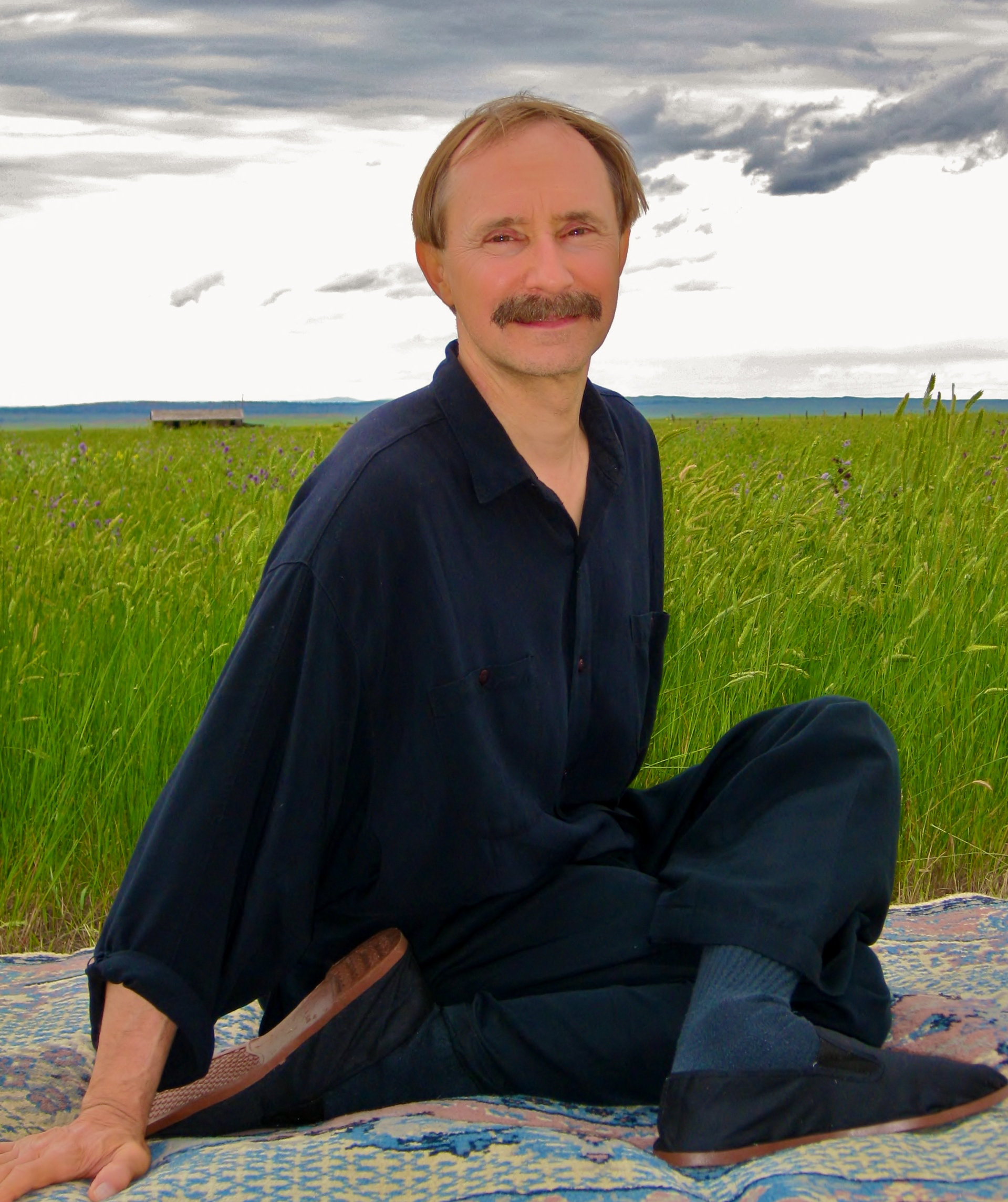
Paulie Zink

The practice of a series of long-held floor poses was introduced in North America in the late 1970s by the martial arts champion Paulie Zink. In the late 1970s, Zink began to teach a synthesis of hatha yoga with Taoist yoga, as well as postures, movements and insights that he had developed himself. He later called this synthesis "Yin and Yang yoga".

In his first years of teaching, many of Zink's students were martial arts practitioners who had developed strong but tight muscles, and he taught them only beginner level Taoist Yoga, focusing on long-held yin poses to alleviate their lack of flexibility. However, as more students came he began to teach more advanced levels. He explained that in order to develop full flexibility, the student must restore his own primal nature, through several Taoist yoga practices, as follows: yin asanas—mostly sitting or lying postures; yang asanas—more active, strenuous postures; Taoist Flow yoga—both yin and yang yoga postures practiced in continuous, smooth and circular motions; qigong—involving simple and gentle movement and breathing techniques; and Taoist alchemy—based, supposedly, upon the Taoist theory of the five elements used in Chinese medicine. Taoist alchemy purports to embody the energetic attributes of various animals and to enliven the five alchemical elements believed to be contained in the body's energetic field, namely Earth, Metal, Water, Wood, and Fire. These are considered to animate distinct qualities in the body, namely calm, strength, fluidity, springiness and lightness, respectively.

=== Paul Grilley ===
The yoga teacher Paul Grilley sought Zink out and studied with him in the 1980s. Grilley studied anatomy in Montana under a doctor, Gary Parker, and then at the University of California, Los Angeles. There, he also taught conventional yoga including Ashtanga and Bikram Yoga, and managed a yoga studio. In 1989, Grilley met Hiroshi Motoyama, a Japanese scholar and yoga practitioner, who had researched the physiology of Traditional Chinese Medicine and written on it extensively. Motoyama was interested in the physiology of the meridians, or subtle pathways and vessels, and the qi or subtle energy hypothesized to flow through or get stored in them. These are fundamental concepts in Chinese medicine and acupuncture. He related these to the parallel concepts of the nadi pathways and chakras of Indian yoga, and the prana said to be carried within them. Grilley began to teach a fusion of the Yin poses he had learned from Zink with hatha yoga and anatomy, and the teachings of Motoyama. He created yin sequences with aims similar to that of an acupuncturist. Yin teacher and author Ulrica Norberg says that Grilley "evolved Yin Yoga further." Bernie Clark, a Yin Yoga author and teacher said that Grilley's synthesis of anatomy, Taoist Yoga, and meridian theory "resonated with many people who recognized the benefits of the practice and related to Paul's model of the body/mind/soul."

=== Sarah Powers ===
One of Grilley's students, the yoga teacher Sarah Powers, began teaching yoga in his style. She incorporated Buddhist psychology and put more emphasis on targeting the meridian systems for health and enlightenment. Her book, Insight Yoga, explains Yin Yoga sequences designed to enhance the flow of qi as understood in Traditional Chinese Medicine. She emphasized a conscious and systematic approach to breathing during yin practice. Grilley had at first called his approach Taoist Yoga, in deference to Zink's term. Powers, noting that the yoga she and Grilley were teaching was different from Zink's, suggested the term Yin Yoga. Zink adopted the term as a short form for "Yin and Yang Yoga." Powers began teaching Yin Yoga in her tours, referring students to Grilley for further information. Powers, Grilley, and Zink began offering Yin Yoga teacher training courses. By 2009, Yin Yoga had become available across North America and in Europe.

== Principles ==
=== Yin and yang ===
Yin Yoga is based on the Taoist concepts of yin and yang, opposite and complementary principles in nature. Yin could be described as stable, immobile, feminine, passive, cold, and downward moving. Yang is understood to be changing, mobile, masculine, active, hot, and upward moving. The sun is considered yang, the moon yin. In the body, the relatively stiff connective tissues (tendons, ligaments, fascia) are considered yin, while the more mobile and pliable muscles and blood are called yang. More passive asanas in yoga are considered yin, whereas the more active, dynamic asanas are described as yang.

Yin Yoga employs specific sequences of poses to stimulate particular meridians, or subtle channels, as understood in Traditional Chinese Medicine; these are the equivalent of the nadi channels in hatha yoga.

In keeping with its roots in Taoist Yoga, Zink says that Yin Yoga has a deeper purpose: to "open the heart and invoke the primal self." Powers says one of the primary objectives of yin practice is the cultivation of inner stillness.

=== Distinction from conventional yoga ===
Although many Yin Yoga poses closely resemble the asanas of conventional or "yang" yoga, they have different names, in part to alert those familiar with conventional yoga not to perform them in the same way. In general, the poses of Yin Yoga are performed with little muscular exertion. For example, in Seal pose, in which a practitioner lies face down and raises the trunk, the upward movement is gradual and entirely supported by the arms, while the legs are relaxed, whereas in Bhujangasana (Cobra Pose), the practitioner actively curves the spine upward in an arc using arms and lower back muscles, and reaches back with the legs strongly. Because Yin Yoga does not make practitioners hot, the temperature of the room is kept a little higher than usual.

== Practice ==
Zink's approach to Yin Yoga consists of both yin and yang postures, and incorporates movement in between postures as a yang element. In contrast, Yin Yoga sessions taught by Grilley and Powers consist of a series of long-held, passive floor poses that primarily affect the lower part of the body—the hips, pelvis, inner thighs, lower spine—about 18 to 24 in number. These areas are especially rich in connective tissues, the "loading" of which (Yin Yoga teachers avoid the word "stretching") is a main focus in this style of yoga.

During the long hold times of the yin asanas, teachers usually give "dharma talks", informal monologues that often explain the physiology and anatomy of poses, including the meridian lines being affected. They may tell traditional Buddhist stories, recite poetry, sing songs, or reflect on their own experience.

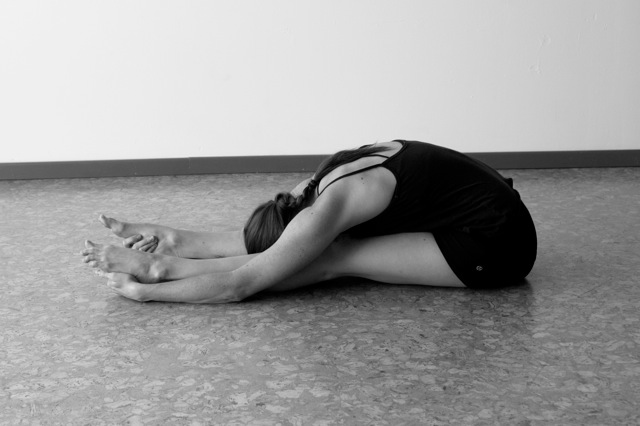
Caterpillar pose, the Yin version of Paschimottanasana: in Yin Yoga, poses are held for an average of five minutes to improve flexibility and restore a fuller range of motion.

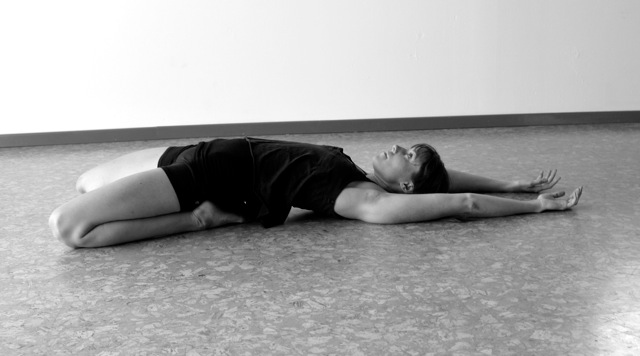
Saddle pose, the Yin version of Supta Virasana: this pose stretches the feet, knees, thighs, and arches the lumbar and sacral vertebrae. It is said to stimulate the Kidney meridian as well as the kidneys.

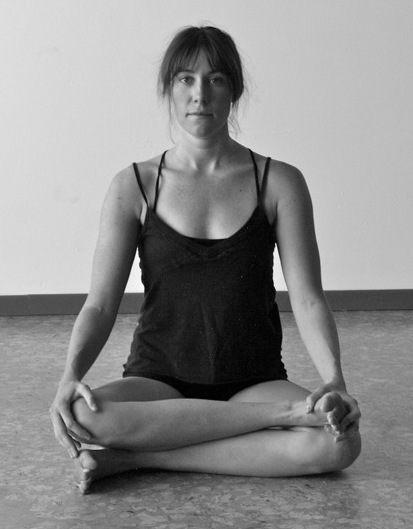
Square pose, the Yin variant of Svastikasana

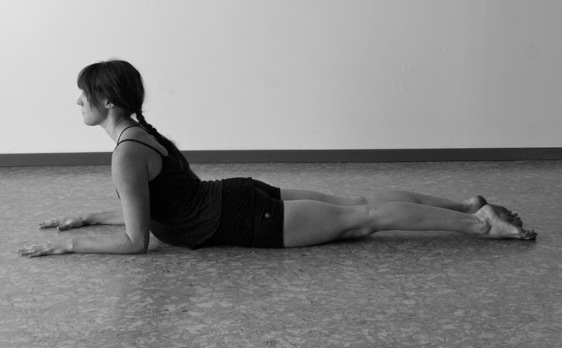
Sphinx pose: In the more advanced version of this pose, the "Seal," the arms are fully extended and the back bend is deeper. Seal pose resembles Bhujangasana, but is performed differently.

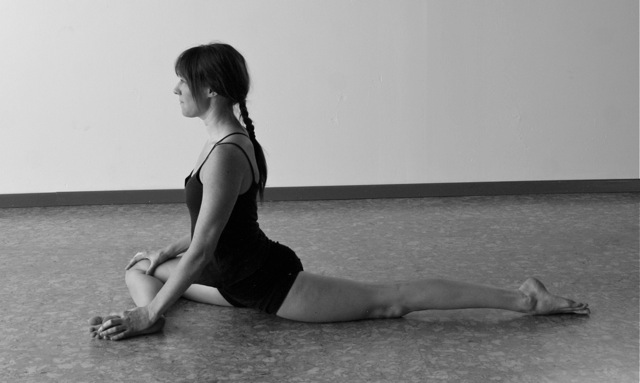
Swan pose, the Yin form of Salamba Kapotasana

== See also ==
- List of asanas § Asanas — Yin Yoga names are given in the table for the 'Yang' poses they most closely resemble in form
- Restorative Yoga — a different long-hold approach from Judith Lasater

== Bibliography ==
- Clark, Bernie (2007). YinSights : a Journey into the Philosophy & Practice of Yin Yoga. Vancouver: B. Clark. ISBN 978-0-9687665-1-4. OCLC 759407291.
- Clark, Bernie (2012). The Complete Guide to Yin Yoga : the Philosophy and Practice of Yin Yoga. Ashland, Oregon: White Cloud Press. ISBN 978-1-935952-50-3. OCLC 707257399.
- Grilley, Paul (2002). Yin Yoga : Outline of a Quiet Practice. Ashland, Oregon: White Cloud Press. ISBN 978-1-883991-43-2. OCLC 49902188.
- Grilley, Paul (2012). Yin Yoga : Principles & Practice. Ashland, Oregon: White Cloud Press. ISBN 978-1-935952-70-1. OCLC 781678727.
- Powers, Sarah (2008). Insight Yoga. Boston: Shambhala. ISBN 978-1-59030-598-0. OCLC 216937520.
- Robinson, Sarah (2020). Yin Magic : how to be still. Womancraft Publishing. ISBN 978-1-910559-61-1. OCLC 1192970509.
