= Talmage Cooley =

American film director and advocate (born 1965)

Talmage Newman Cooley is an American filmmaker and gun violence prevention advocate. Through his production company Kinoglaz Pictures, he is the writer/director of award-winning narrative and documentary films featured at Sundance and over 100 festivals worldwide, as well as numerous PSA spots for social justice organizations. He was the co-Founder and co-CEO of The Center to Prevent Youth Violence (originally named PAX) and the breakthrough Asking Saves Kids gun violence prevention campaign. While attending the Harvard Kennedy School in 2012 he founded Democracy.com. Cooley is also the Founder of The Gun Violence Project.

== Social Justice ==
In the mid 1990s, Cooley left his first job as a bond sales/trader at Morgan Stanley to begin directing television PSA's for prominent social impact organizations such as the National Center for Missing and Exploited Children, The Creative Coalition and the Partnership for a Drug Free America. Through this work, he began researching how large-scale social messaging efforts could successfully shift cultural norms at scale and launch effective grassroots movements nationally. This led to his founding The Gun Violence Project, a collaboration with The Creative Coalition, and then folding that organization into a new organization he cot-founded with Daniel Gross called The Center to Prevent Youth Violence (originally called PAX), which would quickly become the largest non-lobbying group focused on the gun violence issue in America. Cooley was also a member of the Founding Committee of the Million Mom March in 2000, which drew 750,000 people to the Washington Mall (and another 400,000 people to satellite marches across the country), one of the largest marches ever organized on the Washington Mall. The Asking Saves Kids Campaign was chosen as the official call-to-action of the national Million Mom March.

In 2012, Cooley graduated from the Harvard Kennedy School with a master's degree focused on social justice strategy and social impact innovation, technology and communications design. This work led to the 2013 launch of Democracy.com, an online platform for civic engagement that "empowers every citizen to take action on the issues and elections they care about in under 60 seconds". Democracy.com won Best Technology Innovation at the Reed Awards, Best Organizing Tool from Campaign Workshop, and a Pollie Award for Best Fundraising Platform, scaling to over a million users before acquisition by Mark Cuban.

=== Gun Violence Project, PAX, Center to Prevent Youth Violence ===
In 1995, Cooley founded The Gun Violence Project, a non-profit organization with the mission to reposition the gun violence issue as an urgent matter of public health with practical solutions rather than the seemingly intractable political wedge issue it had become. In 1996, The Gun Violence Project, in collaboration with The Creative Coalition, created its first campaign (voice-over by Alec Baldwin), which focused on the dangers of kids taking their parents' guns to school. In 1997 The Gun Violence Project became PAX.

=== Asking Saves Kids (ASK) and SPEAK UP Campaigns ===
By 2000, PAX had become the largest non-lobbying organization working on the US gun violence issue as a result of the success and rapid expansion of its ASK and SPEAK UP campaigns. As a result of this success, Cooley joined the Organizing Committee for the Million Mom March on the Washington Mall in 2000, and the ASK Campaign was named the lead anti-gun violence program promoted by the March due to the success of its family focused message directed at parents. Still active, the ASK (Asking Saves Kids) Campaign leverages partnerships with over 400 national and grassroots organizations that promote the ASK message, driven by the fact that almost 40% of homes with children have a gun, and almost half those guns are either unlocked or loaded. The message to parents is "ASK your neighbors about guns before you send your kids over to play. It's not about politics, it's about common sense parenting.". The SPEAK UP campaign created a national hotline for young people to anonymously report weapon related threats in their schools and neighborhoods, receiving over 40,000 calls since inception.

Cooley directed commercials for the ASK and SPEAK UP campaigns, with voice-over by Julianne Moore, Alec Baldwin and Susan Sarandon. These campaigns pioneered a new approach to the gun violence issue, designed to have immediate impact on the frequency of gun deaths and injuries while also shifting the national dialogue around guns to a prevention-driven, public health and safety orientation. This innovative, non-partisan approach to gun violence prevention represented a stark contrast to the politics-based framing which had dominated the issue for many years without significant success.

In 2011, PAX officially changed its name to The Center to Prevent Youth Violence (CPYV) to better reflect the youth and family focus of its prevention driven campaigns. Cooley resigned as co-CEO of CPYV in 2004 to focus on film writing and directing, but remained on the organization's Board of Trustees until its merger with the Brady Center in 2012.

By 2022, the ASK campaign had been active for over 22 years and promoted by hundreds of organizations and communities nationwide. ASK remains the leading public health and safety campaign dedicated to gun violence prevention in the US, with over 19 million Americans signing the ASK Pledge (www.askingsaveskids.org) and over 31 million parents reporting that they ask their neighbors about guns where their kids play, up significantly from a pre-launch baseline of 3 million parents who ask.

=== 2017 Harvard/GAO Report names ASK Campaign as only verifiably effective gun violence prevention initiative ===
In October 2017, the Harvard School of Public Health and the US Government Accountability Office (GAO) released a report on the effectiveness of 16 gun violence reduction programs, ultimately finding the "ASK" program to be the only gun violence reduction program that has been independently evaluated and found to be effective. The report, entitled "Personal Firearms: Programs that Promote Safe Storage and Research on their Effectiveness," was prepared over a two-year period in response to a request by the Congressional HELP (Health, Education, Labor, and Pensions) Committee. The report evaluated 16 programs, both regional and national, that are aimed at spreading awareness of the importance of reducing gun violence against children and families. The ASK campaign was found to be the only verifiably effective program out of the 16 programs. Jim Accomando, president of The National PTA, said "Child and school safety starts at home. When families store their guns responsibly, they're much less likely to end up in schools and tragedies are less likely to occur. National PTA is proud to support the ASK campaign to help prevent gun-related incidents and keep children safe."

=== Democracy.com and Theory of Change NYC ===
In 2012, Cooley founded Democracy.com while attending the Harvard Kennedy School's MPA master's degree program. The company launched its first generation site in 2014, which connected candidates and civic organizations with citizen supporters. The site was awarded "Best Technology Innovation" by the American Association of Political Consultants, "Best Fundraising Platform" by Campaign and Elections Magazine and "Top Campaign and Organizing Tool" by Campaign Workshop. The company achieved over 30% month on month growth and reached over a million users. Democracy.com was acquired by Mark Cuban in late 2019. Since 2012, Cooley has advised social justice organizations, impact-focused organizations, universities and non-profits through Theory of Change NYC, a social impact consulting practice based in New York City.

== Film and Photography ==
=== Film ===
In 2004, Cooley wrote and directed his first film, Pol Pot's Birthday, a short satirical comedy which premiered at the Sundance Film Festival, won numerous Best Film awards at festivals worldwide, and is included in the Sundance Collection at the New York Museum of Modern Art (MOMA). The film was featured in American Cinematographer magazine for its evocative use of newly emerging techniques for digital cinematography. The film's style of awkward comedy has been compared to the BBC television series The Office.

In 2005, Cooley directed a short documentary, Dimmer, about a gang of blind teenagers who roam the streets of the bleak industrial neighborhoods of Buffalo, New York. Featuring a score drawn from music by the band Interpol, Dimmer premiered at the Sundance Film Festival, was short-listed for the Academy Award for Best Short Documentary, and won numerous international Best Film awards as well as being exhibited at the New York Museum of Modern Art (MOMA) and included in its Sundance Collection.

A review by Sundance Film Festival programmer Mike Plante said, "Cooley’s subversive comedy Pol Pot’s Birthday is a great crowd-pleaser and festival fan-favorite. The concept of Pol Pot forcing his staff to participate in his own birthday is so well done that it functions as both straightforward parody and high political satire, earning praise from circles connected with both high art and broad comedy." About Cooley's documentary Dimmer, Plante said, "Cooley discovered a gang of blind teenage boys and documented their life in the bleak, rust-belt town of Buffalo, New York. Tailoring the style and tone of his project to match the rhythm and feel of the subjects, Dimmer is a one-of-a-kind elegy to an under-represented slice of society."

Cooley's films and scripts have been invited to over 100 festivals worldwide and won over 20 Best Film and other honors. Cooley has been profiled in numerous magazines, such as The Fader , Create, and RES Magazine. He was selected for the "RES Magazine 10 Top Talents" issue and named by Screen International as one of "10 Talents to Watch"

=== Film Awards ===
-- Sundance Film Festival—Premiere (2 films)
-- Academy Awards ("Oscars") -- Short Documentary Shortlist
-- Worldwide Short Film Festival (Toronto) -- Best Film
-- Curtas Vila Do Cordo Festival (Portugal) -- Best Short Documentary
-- Seattle One Reel Festival—Best Film
-- Asian American Film Festival—Best Short Film
-- Nashville Film Festival—Special Mention
-- Aspen Film Festival—Silver Prize
-- NY Museum of Modern Art—Sundance Collection (2 films)
-- NY Museum of Modern Art—Special Exhibition
-- Hammer Museum LA—Special Exhibition
-- RESfest—Best Film
-- RESfest—Special Jury Prize
-- RiverRun Festival—Best Documentary Short
-- Dubrovnik Film Festival (Croatia) -- Best Short Film
-- Newport Beach Film festival—Best Screenplay
-- Filmstock Festival (UK) -- Best Film
-- Filmstock Festival (UK) -- Best Concept
-- Grenada Film Festival (Spain) -- Best Cinematography
-- Silverlake Film Festival—Festival Director's Prize
-- St. Louis Film Festival—Best Short Film
-- Cinequest Screenwriting Competition—Finalist

=== Photography ===
Cooley's editorial photography has been featured in The New York Times, The Village Voice, The Independent, The Guardian and other newspapers, magazines and books published in the US and Europe. His fine art photography was shown in the former CBGB art gallery "CB's 313" next door to the now demolished club on the Bowery in New York City. Cooley also co-authored a photography and essay book with Kate Spade Fashions and Partners & Spade co-founder Andy Spade entitled Public Love, published by Chronicle Books.

Source: Footnotes
