= Daniel Gross =

Daniel Gross may refer to:

- Daniel Gross (journalist) (born 1967)
- Daniel Gross (entrepreneur)
- Dan Gross, American public relations and crisis communications professional
- Dan Gross (activist), president of the Brady Campaign to Prevent Gun Violence

== See also ==
- Daniel J. Gross Catholic High School, Nebraska, United States
