= Aborn =

Aborn is a surname. Notable people with the surname include:

- Lora Aborn (1907–2005), American classical composer
- Richard Aborn (born 1952), American attorney

== See also ==
- Aborn Opera Company, operated by Milton Aborn and Sargent Aborn
