= Gloria Frankel =

American LGBTQ rights advocate

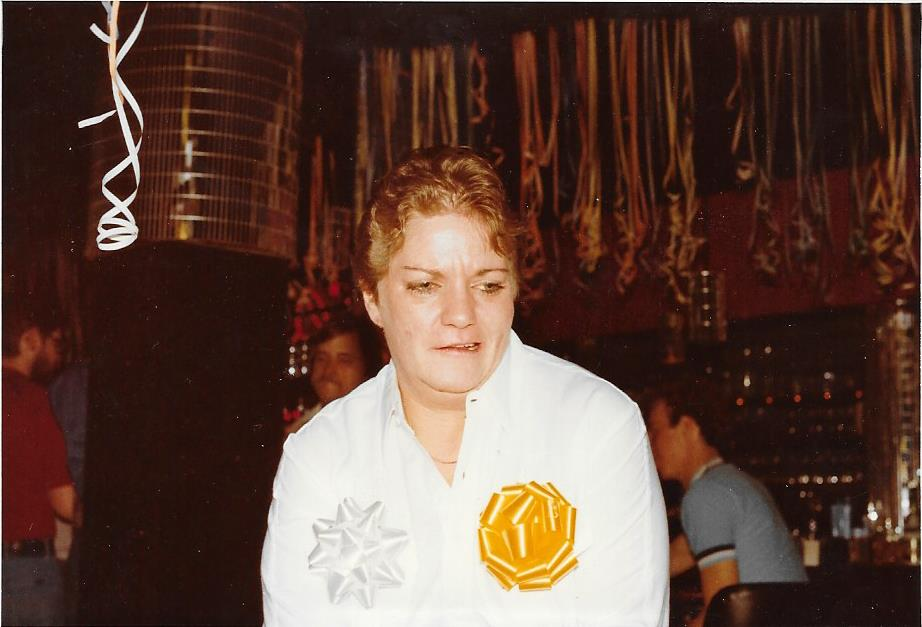
- Frankel circa 1980s
- Born: April 15, 1940; Columbus, Ohio, United States
- Died: October 6, 2007 (aged 67)
- Occupations: business owner, LGBTQ rights advocate
- Known for: opened the first LGBTQ club in South Bend, Indiana

Gloria Frankel (1940–2007) was an LGBTQ rights advocate. She opened the first LGBTQ club in South Bend, Indiana in 1971 called the Seahorse Cabaret. Frankel was a grassroots activist for gay and lesbian rights in Michiana and a mentor to others who would eventually open other gay clubs in the area. Part of Frankel's activism included decriminalizing same sex dancing in South Bend. Frankel was a leader of LGBTQ justice in South Bend, IN.

== Activism ==
During the 1970s Frankel led the Michiana Lambda Society events that centered on LGBTQ Civil Rights and worked to grow the sense of community among LGBTQ people in South Bend. In the 1980s Frankel allowed her club the Seahorse to host free HIV/AIDS testing, which she hoped would increase testing and education about HIV/AIDS within the LGBTQ community.

Frankel oversaw the hosting of drag pageants at the Seahorse Cabaret. According to Ben Wineland, these events were typically expensive and socially challenging. The success of the Seahorse provided a space for the pageants. These events indicated Frankel's intent to create a safe space for not only gay patrons, but also drag performers and transgender people.

=== The 1970s ===
Frankel spread information about her bar through word of mouth and public advertising. She worked to included gay men, lesbians, as well as transgender people. Frankel and the bar combated police pressure and even challenged the city of South Bend on the criminalization of same-sex dancing. In 1977, the state of Indiana legalized all homosexual activity.

After the Lambda Legal Non-Profit Organization, an organization centered on legal justice of LGBTQ people, was founded in 1973, the Michiana chapter was established. Frankel actively contributed to the Lambda society by hosting events at the Seahorse and providing monetary support.

=== The 1980s ===
At the beginning of the AIDS crisis in America during the Reagan administration, the illness was viewed as an individual problem rather than a national one. The administration was unwilling to discuss the issue or provide resources for those afflicted. In 1982 at a press briefing, Reagan's Press Secretary Larry Speakes joked about the disease and said that no one in the White House knew anything about it. Reagan did not publicly speak about AIDS until 1985, and did not address it fully until 1987 after 20,849 people had died.

In the late 1980s South Bend opened an AIDS Ministries in order to provide relief and information to the community. At the time, the group worked out of Methodist churches in the city and remained out of the public eye. Though this was not a unique narrative, individuals in the LGBTQ community in South Bend rarely went for testing or treatment for HIV/AIDS due to a fear of discrimination and shame.

In response, Frankel dedicated the Seahorse as a location for free HIV testing and treatment services during the day. Frankel hoped that the Seahorse would feel safer because of the sense of community already there. Frankel would continue to support the LGBTQ community in South Bend and AIDS Ministries in the coming years.

== The Seahorse Cabaret ==
In smaller cities across America, bars acted as a hub for the LGBTQ community. The origins of the South Bend LGBTQ community's visibility trace back to the opening on the Seahorse Cabaret in the 1970s. The Seahorse increased visibility in the city by spreading flyers to advertise events and shows. Drag performances were the most common form of entertainment at the Seahorse. The Seahorse held drag pageants and contests, which was indicative of the bar's success as these pageants were expensive and dangerous to host.

As the bar's popularity grew, Frankel decided to move the Seahorse to a larger location to accommodate patrons. In 1975 the bar was moved to a new location in South Bend, IN and was called "the Seahorse II".

In the early 1980s, the Seahorse was nearly destroyed by arsonists. However, Frankel was able to reopen in 10 days with the help of members in the LGBTQ community.

=== Police ===
The police force in South Bend, IN routinely raided the Seahorse throughout the 1970s and 1980s, and even into the 1990s. Police presence was also very common at the bar. LGBTQ oral history interviews conducted by Katie M. Lee revealed that it was routine for the police to harass and intimidate drag performers. Regardless of pressure of law enforcement, the Seahorse served as a model for future LGBTQ bars that opened in the area throughout the years following the bar's establishment.
