= Mike Richards (ice hockey) =

Canadian ice hockey player (born 1985)

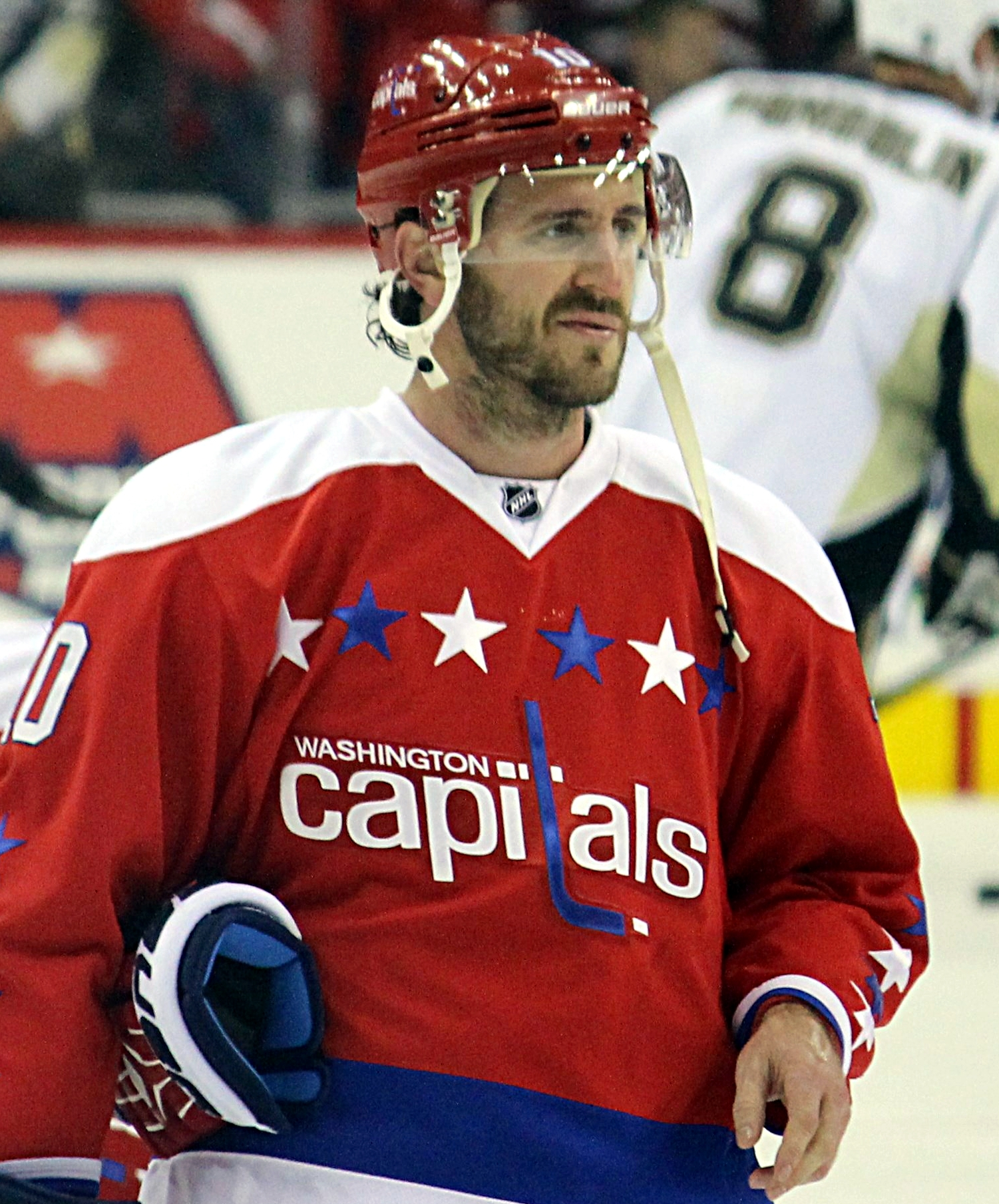
- Richards with the Washington Capitals in April 2016
- Born: February 11, 1985 (age 41) Kenora, Ontario, Canada
- Height: 5 ft 11 in (180 cm)
- Weight: 196 lb (89 kg; 14 st 0 lb)
- Position: Centre
- Shot: Left
- Played for: Philadelphia Flyers; Los Angeles Kings; Washington Capitals
- National team: Canada
- NHL draft: 24th overall, 2003; Philadelphia Flyers
- Playing career: 2005–2016

Michael Richards (born February 11, 1985) is a Canadian former professional ice hockey player. Richards played 11 National Hockey League (NHL) seasons, spending time with the Philadelphia Flyers, Los Angeles Kings, and Washington Capitals.

Richards was drafted in the first round of the 2003 NHL entry draft by the Flyers, 24th overall, and made his NHL debut in 2005. He was named captain of the Flyers in 2008 at just 23 years old, leading Philadelphia to a Stanley Cup Final appearance in 2010. In 2011, the Flyers traded Richards to the Los Angeles Kings, where he was a member of two Stanley Cup-winning teams with Los Angeles in 2012 and 2014. The Kings terminated his contract in 2015 after Richards was arrested for possession of oxycodone, a controlled substance, without a prescription. The drug charges were later stayed by the judge, effectively ending the case against him.

In addition to his two Stanley Cup titles, Richards won an Olympic gold medal with Canada senior team at the 2010 Winter Olympics. Richards' career also included championships in the Memorial Cup (2003), World Junior Championship (2005), and Calder Cup (2005).

== Playing career ==
=== Early years and NHL draft ===
Richards grew up playing minor league hockey in his hometown of Kenora, Ontario. He played level A rep hockey for the Kenora Thistles until being drafted fourth overall in the 2001 OHL Priority Selection by the Kitchener Rangers. Richards was not a noted prospect prior to the selection. After receiving a tip from a friend in Kenora, Rangers general manager Jamie MacDonald traveled to see Richards play on two occasions.

Richards began his major junior career with the Rangers in 2001–02. He was a member of a dominant 2003 Kitchener team that captured the Memorial Cup and led the team in scoring during the regular season, with 87 points. Following the Canadian Hockey League (CHL) championship victory, Richards was chosen as team captain. That summer, the Philadelphia Flyers selected him 24th overall in the 2003 NHL entry draft with the second of the team's two first round picks that season.

Upon being drafted, Richards returned to the Rangers for two more seasons. In his last season of junior, 2004–05, he embarked on another Memorial Cup run with Kitchener, but despite a remarkable 28-point performance from Richards in just 15 playoff games, the Rangers were eliminated by the London Knights in the OHL semifinals. As soon as Kitchener was eliminated, the Flyers assigned Richards to the Philadelphia Phantoms, their American Hockey League (AHL) affiliate, for their playoff run. Averaging over a point per game, he became a key part of the Phantoms' 2005 Calder Cup championship.

=== Philadelphia Flyers (2005–2011) ===
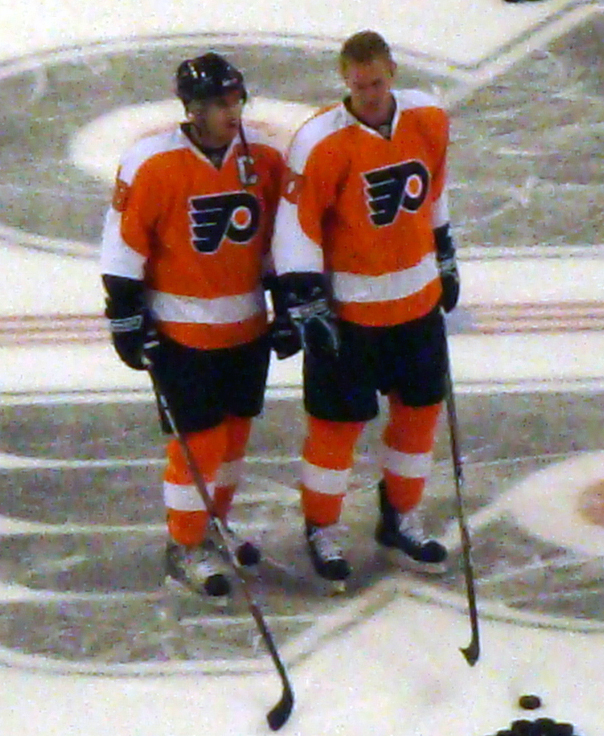
Richards (left) and Jeff Carter prior to a Flyers game in March 2009

Richards made his NHL debut with the Flyers the following season, 2005–06, and scored a goal in his first game on October 5, 2005, against the New York Rangers. Later in the season, he scored his first career NHL hat-trick, which included two short-handed goals, against the New York Islanders on February 8, 2006. His hat-trick was the first by a Flyer rookie since Mikael Renberg on February 15, 1994. Richards finished his NHL rookie season with 34 points in 79 games, third among Flyers rookies, behind Jeff Carter (drafted the same year as Richards, 11th overall) and R. J. Umberger, respectively.

Following an injury-shortened sophomore season – Richards was kept to 32 points in 59 games due to stomach surgery – Richards emerged as a star with the Flyers in 2007–08 and topped the team in scoring with 75 points. Recognizing his ascent as a leader on the team, Richards was named one of the Flyers' alternate captains at the outset of the season and was signed to a lengthy 12-year contract extension worth $69 million on December 13, 2007. Shortly after signing the deal, Richards was selected to represent the Eastern Conference at the 2008 NHL All-Star Game in Atlanta. In the first NHL All-Star Game of his career, Richards registered an assist.

As the Flyers entered the 2008 Stanley Cup playoffs against the third-seeded Washington Capitals, Richards scored his first playoff goal on a penalty shot against Washington goaltender Cristobal Huet in game three. In doing so, he became just the second player in NHL history to score his first playoff goal on a penalty shot (the first was Wayne Connolly who did so with the Minnesota North Stars in 1968). The Flyers defeated the Capitals in seven games and then upset the Montreal Canadiens before falling to the Pittsburgh Penguins in the Eastern Conference Final. Richards finished his 2008 playoff run with 14 points in 17 games.

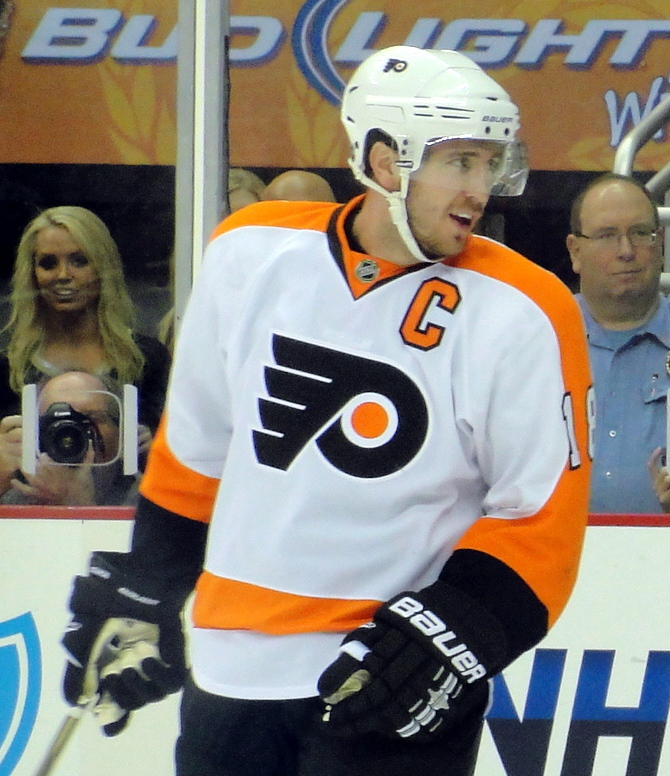
Richards in October 2010

Before the start of the 2008–09 season, on September 17, 2008, Richards was named the 17th captain in Flyers history, succeeding previous captain Jason Smith, who had signed with the Ottawa Senators in the off-season. On February 15, 2009, Richards became the first player in NHL history to score three career three-on-five short-handed goals when he beat New York Rangers goaltender Henrik Lundqvist in a 5–2 win. Six days later, on February 21, Richards became the first Flyer in team history to score a short-handed goal in three consecutive games and the first NHL player to do so since Joe Sakic in 1998. He finished the season second in team scoring to Jeff Carter with 80 points to go with a League-leading seven shorthanded goals.

Facing the Pittsburgh Penguins for the second consecutive year in the 2009 playoffs, Richards added five points in six games, but could not help the Flyers from being eliminated. After Richards' season ended, he was announced as a finalist for the Frank J. Selke Trophy, awarded to the NHL's top defensive forward, along with Pavel Datsyuk of the Detroit Red Wings and Ryan Kesler of the Vancouver Canucks. The next day, on April 29, 2009, it was revealed that Richards required surgery on both shoulders. He had reportedly felt discomfort since training camp and was on anti-inflammatory medication throughout the season. Richards narrowly missed out on the Selke, which would have been Philadelphia's first individual player trophy since Eric Lindros won the Hart Memorial Trophy in 1995. Datsyuk won the vote 945 to 942 in the closest Selke Trophy race since its inception.

The 2009–10 season started successfully for Richards, who scored five goals in his first three games, including his second career hat-trick in the second period of the Flyers' home opener against the Washington Capitals on October 6, 2009. Against the Florida Panthers on October 24, Richards delivered a shoulder hit to David Booth's head. Knocked unconscious, Booth fell awkwardly on his head and neck and had to be carried of the ice on a stretcher. Richards was given a game misconduct, but was not suspended by the NHL. From the outset of the season, Richards was involved in an ongoing feud with the Philadelphia media. He issued a verbal boycott against the media in October 2009 after he was asked if the trade of forward Joffrey Lupul to the Anaheim Ducks was the result of a partying lifestyle that many players on the team were accused of sharing. Accusations of team players drinking and partying excessively continued throughout the season, specifically with Richards and Jeff Carter. As the team began to lose, Richards criticized the local media in an interview with The Hockey News for "throwing the team under the bus." He also told the Philadelphia Daily News that the drinking accusations were fabricated. Following a loss to the Washington Capitals on January 17, 2010, Richards reportedly engaged in a verbal exchange with reporters outside the Flyers' locker room, telling them he was unhappy with how the team was being covered in the media. On February 1, 2010, Richards scored his 100th career NHL goal. The Flyers barely scraped into the playoffs, winning in a shootout in their last game of the season to secure their place. However, they then embarked on a remarkable run to the 2010 Stanley Cup Final, a run in which Richards cemented his captaincy and scored some important goals, which led to renewed comparisons to Bobby Clarke. The biggest highlight of Richards' performance in the playoffs was what Flyers fans call "The Shift"; during game five of the Eastern Conference Final against the Montreal Canadiens, Richards scored a spectacular short-handed goal to tie the game at 1–1 seconds after throwing a big hit on Marc-André Bergeron. The run eventually ended in the Stanley Cup Final when the Flyers lost 4–3 in overtime of game six to the Chicago Blackhawks.

Richards scored 23 goals to go along with 43 assists during the 2010–11 season as the Flyers earned the second seed in the Eastern Conference, and played the Buffalo Sabres in the first round of the 2011 playoffs. After eliminating the Sabres in seven games, Richards and the Flyers were eliminated by the Boston Bruins in a four-game sweep. Richards recorded one goal and six assists during the playoffs.

=== Los Angeles Kings (2011–2015) ===
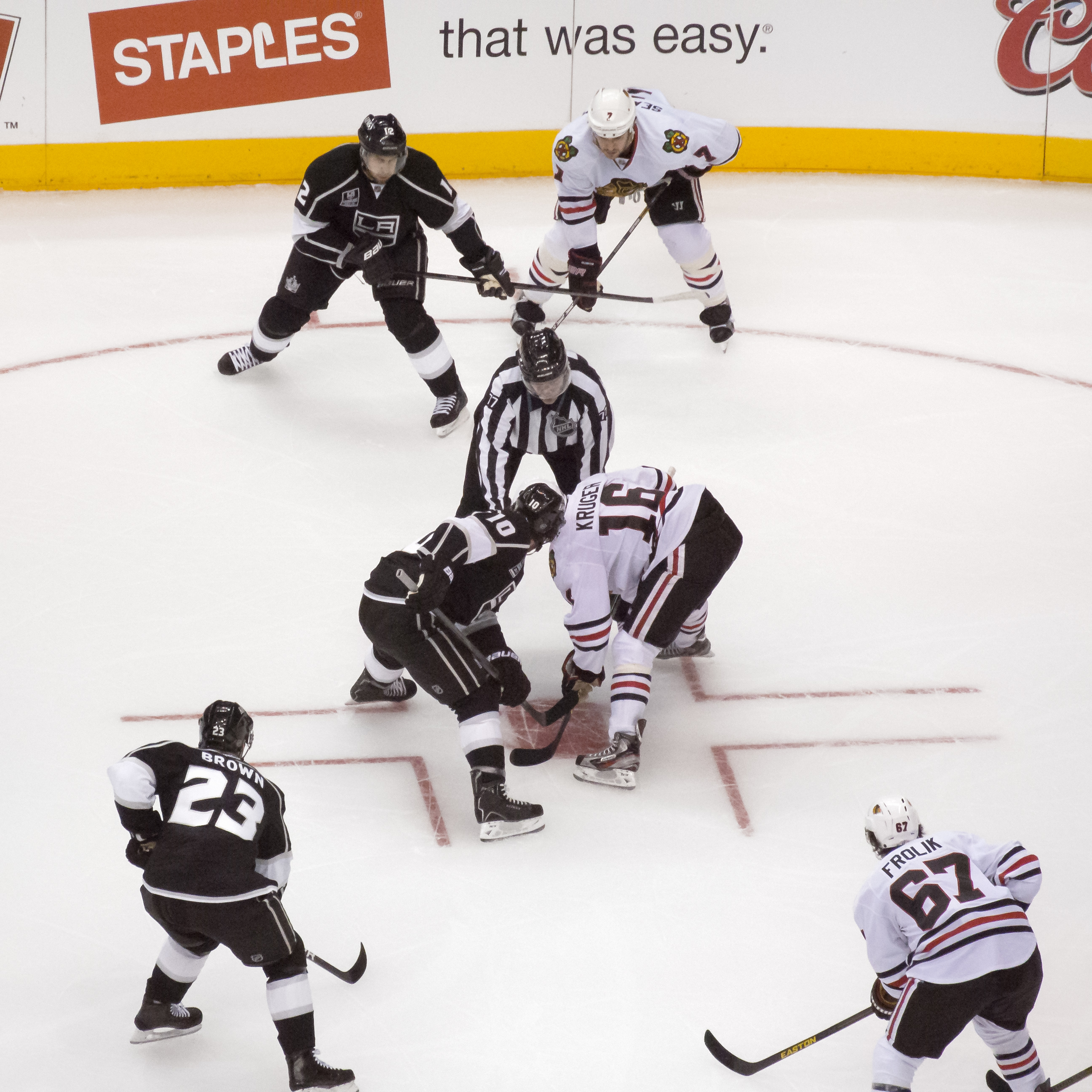
Richards preparing for a faceoff against Marcus Krüger in January 2013

Richards and Flyers prospect Rob Bordson were traded to the Los Angeles Kings on June 23, 2011. In return, the Flyers received Wayne Simmonds, Brayden Schenn, and Los Angeles' 2012 second-round draft pick. Richards reacted to the major deal by saying, "I was very shocked. At first I was shocked and then excited – I’m excited to move out to L.A. and be a part of a team that has a ton of great players. I’m just looking forward to helping them out." A Dan Gross article suggested that Richards' "hard-partying ways" influenced the Flyers' decision to trade Richards. However, Flyers general manager Paul Holmgren stated that it was "preposterous" that partying had anything to do with the trade. Jeff Carter was also traded, being sent to the Columbus Blue Jackets. Richards and Carter were reportedly traded due to their long contracts and to clear up cap space for Ilya Bryzgalov. On October 15, Richards returned to Philadelphia and received a standing ovation from the crowd. He would assist on the winning goal, as the Kings won the game three–2. Richards suffered a concussion and missed eight games during the season. He was later reunited with Carter on February 23, 2012, upon Carter's trade to the Kings from the Columbus Blue Jackets. On May 3, 2012, during game three of the Western Conference semifinals, Richards recorded his first career Gordie Howe hat trick when he got into a fight with Jamie Langenbrunner of the St. Louis Blues at 14:00 of the first period, scored a goal at 9:31 of the second, and recorded an assist at 11:48 of the third. On June 11, Richards won the Stanley Cup with the Kings, recording four goals and 11 assists in 20 playoff games. The following campaign, he recorded 32 points in the lockout-shortened 2012–13 season as the Kings would fail in their bid to repeat as Cup champions, losing to the eventual champion Chicago Blackhawks in the 2013 playoffs.

On April 30, 2014, Richards, along with his teammate Jeff Carter, became the first players to play on two teams that came back from a 3–0 deficit to win a playoff series in seven games when the Kings defeated the Sharks 5–1 in game seven of their first-round playoff series. Both had been on the Flyers in 2010 when they came back against the Bruins. On June 13, 2014, Richards became a Stanley Cup champion for the second time when the Kings defeated the New York Rangers 3–2 in double overtime in game five of the 2014 Stanley Cup Final.

On January 26, 2015, Richards was placed on waivers by the Kings. The next day, on January 27, Richards cleared waivers and joined the Kings' AHL affiliate, the Manchester Monarchs, and after tallying 14 points in 16 games with the Monarchs, he was recalled by the Kings on March 22.

On June 29, 2015, Kings general manager Dean Lombardi announced that the club had terminated Richards' contract, which had five years remaining, for "a material breach of his Standard Player's Contract." The termination resulted from an incident at the US-Canada border in which Royal Canadian Mounted Police arrested Richards for possession of oxycodone, a controlled substance, without a prescription. Richards' 12-year, $69-million contract, which he had signed in 2008 while as captain of the Philadelphia Flyers, had $22 million remaining on it when it was terminated. On August 10, it was announced that the National Hockey League Players' Association (NHLPA) had filed a grievance on behalf of Richards to contest the termination. On October 9, 2015, the Kings announced a settlement with Richards, thus making him a free agent. On February 24, 2016, the drug charges against Richards were stayed by a Manitoba court.

=== Washington Capitals (2015–2016) ===
On January 6, 2016, the Washington Capitals and Richards announced they had agreed to a one-year contract worth US$1 million. This came after Richards was cleared by the league to sign an NHL contract.

== International play ==
Medal record

Men's ice hockey

Representing Canada

Winter Olympics
Gold medal – first place	2010 Vancouver	

World Junior Championships
Gold medal – first place	2005 United States	
Silver medal – second place	2004 Finland	

Richards made his international debut with Canada junior team at the 2004 World Junior Championships. Despite a third period lead in the gold medal game, Canada lost to the United States 4–3.

The following year, Richards returned to the World Juniors as team captain and led Canada to its first gold medal in the tournament since 1997. Richards tallied five points in six games.

After Richards' rookie season with the Philadelphia Flyers, he was chosen to his first tournament with Canada senior team at the 2006 World Championships. Richards recorded five points in nine games, but Canada was defeated by Finland in the bronze medal game.

On December 30, 2009, Richards was selected to play as a member of Canada at the 2010 Winter Olympics. Richards helped lead Canada to an 8–0 victory over Norway in the first game of the tournament by scoring a goal on February 17, 2010. He would go on to record two goals and three assists in seven games, along with a +5 rating. This included an important assist on the first goal by the Canadians in the gold medal game where he forced a turnover and fired a shot on goal; the rebound was scored by Jonathan Toews. The Canadians ultimately won the game three–2 in overtime, giving Richards an Olympic gold medal.

== Personal life ==
Richards was born in Kenora, Ontario, to parents Norm and Irene. He has two brothers, Mark and Matt.

Growing up, Mike Richards attended Beaver Brae Secondary School in Kenora, until being drafted to the Kitchener Rangers, at which point he attended Eastwood Collegiate Institute in Kitchener.

In March 2019, Richards became engaged to Cate Chant. The pair eventually married on July 4, 2020.

Richards is an avid fisherman and began to compete in fishing tournaments after his retirement from professional hockey.

== Records ==
- NHL record for most career 5-on-3 shorthanded goals — 3
- First and only player in NHL history to play in two series in which his team came back from a 3–0 deficit to take the series in seven games (Philadelphia Flyers in 2010 and Los Angeles Kings in 2014). Jeff Carter was his teammate in both series, but did not play in the Flyers' comeback due to an injury.

== Career statistics ==
=== Regular season and playoffs ===
			Regular season					Playoffs
Season	Team	League	GP	G	A	Pts	PIM	GP	G	A	Pts	PIM
2001–02	Kitchener Rangers	OHL	65	20	38	58	52	4	0	1	1	6
2002–03	Kitchener Rangers	OHL	67	37	50	87	99	21	9	18	27	24
2003–04	Kitchener Rangers	OHL	58	36	53	89	82	1	0	0	0	0
2004–05	Kitchener Rangers	OHL	43	22	36	58	75	15	11	17	28	36
2004–05	Philadelphia Phantoms	AHL	—	—	—	—	—	14	7	8	15	28
2005–06	Philadelphia Flyers	NHL	79	11	23	34	65	6	0	1	1	0
2006–07	Philadelphia Flyers	NHL	59	10	22	32	52	—	—	—	—	—
2007–08	Philadelphia Flyers	NHL	73	28	47	75	76	17	7	7	14	10
2008–09	Philadelphia Flyers	NHL	79	30	50	80	63	6	1	4	5	6
2009–10	Philadelphia Flyers	NHL	82	31	31	62	79	23	7	16	23	18
2010–11	Philadelphia Flyers	NHL	81	23	43	66	62	11	1	6	7	15
2011–12	Los Angeles Kings	NHL	74	18	26	44	71	20	4	11	15	17
2012–13	Los Angeles Kings	NHL	48	12	20	32	42	15	3	9	12	8
2013–14	Los Angeles Kings	NHL	82	11	30	41	28	26	3	7	10	17
2014–15	Manchester Monarchs	AHL	16	3	11	14	4	—	—	—	—	—
2014–15	Los Angeles Kings	NHL	53	5	11	16	39	—	—	—	—	—
2015–16	Washington Capitals	NHL	39	2	3	5	8	12	0	0	0	4
NHL totals			749	181	306	487	585	136	26	61	87	95

=== International ===
Year	Team	Event	Result	GP	G	A	Pts	PIM
2002	Canada Ontario	U17	3rd place, bronze medalist(s)	6	2	6	8	0
2004	Canada	WJC	2nd place, silver medalist(s)	6	2	3	5	2
2005	Canada	WJC	1st place, gold medalist(s)	6	1	4	5	2
2006	Canada	WC	4th	9	3	2	5	10
2010	Canada	OG	1st place, gold medalist(s)	7	2	3	5	0
Junior totals				18	5	13	18	4
Senior totals				16	5	5	10	10

=== All-Star Games ===
Year	Location	G	A	P
2008	Atlanta	0	1	1
All-Star totals		0	1	1

== Awards ==
Junior

- Memorial Cup champion – 2003
- Memorial Cup All-Star Team — 2003
- OHL Second All-Star Team — 2005

Professional

- Calder Cup champion – 2005
- NHL All-Star Game — 2008
- Bobby Clarke Trophy – 2008, 2009
- Gene Hart Memorial Award – 2008
- Stanley Cup champion – 2012, 2014

International

- World Junior gold medal — 2005
- Winter Olympics gold medal – 2010

Awards and achievements
Preceded by Jeff Carter	Philadelphia Flyers first-round draft pick 2003	Succeeded by Steve Downie
Preceded by Simon Gagné	Winner of the Bobby Clarke Trophy; 2008, 2009	Succeeded by Chris Pronger
Preceded by Jason Smith	Philadelphia Flyers captain 2008–2011	Succeeded by Chris Pronger
