= James Brady =

White House Press Secretary under Ronald Reagan (1940–2014)

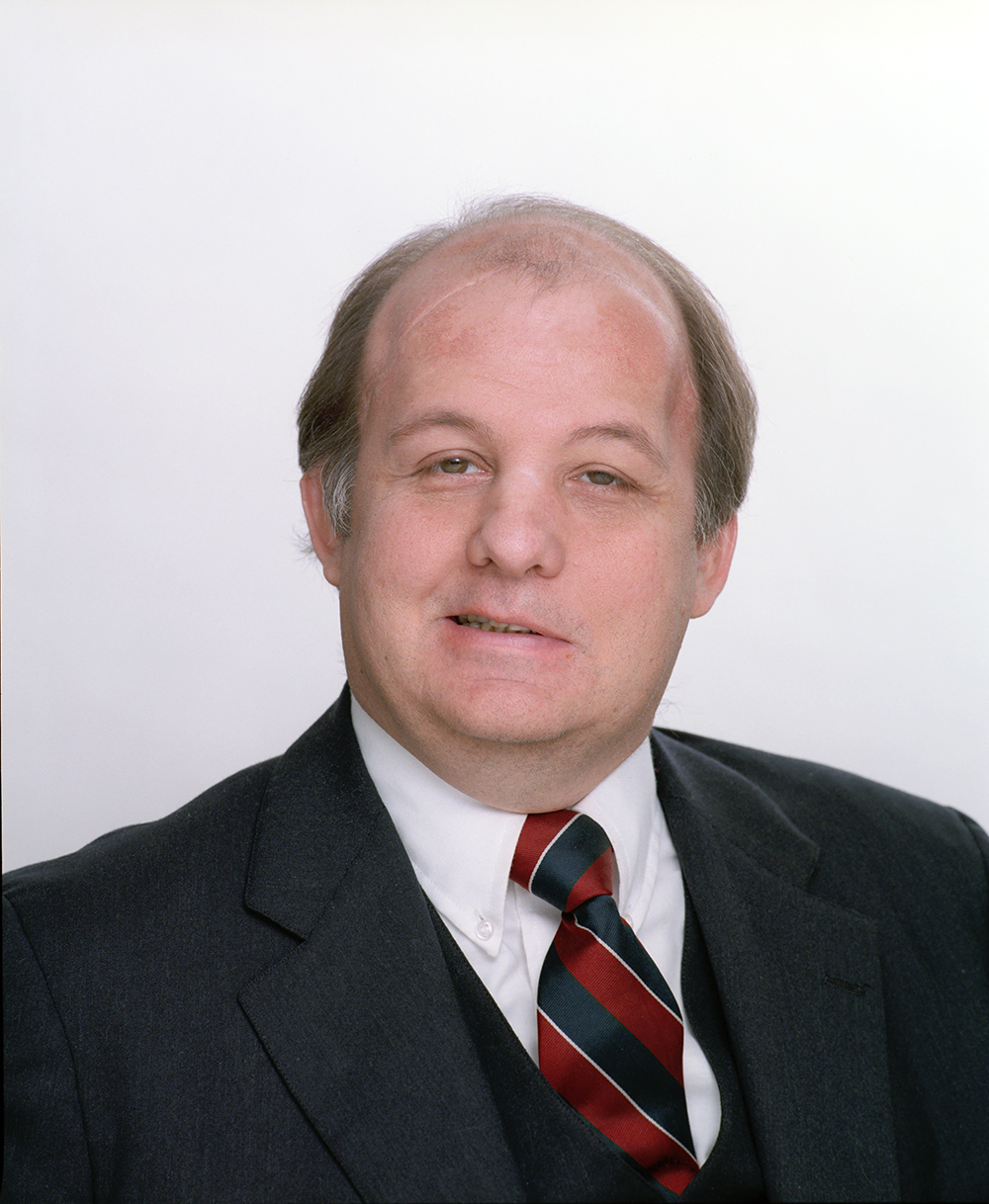
- Brady in 1986

17th White House Press Secretary
- In office January 20, 1981 – January 20, 1989; On leave: March 30, 1981 – January 20, 1989 (Note: Brady formally retained the title of Press Secretary until the end of the Reagan Administration on January 20, 1989, but he did not brief the press after Reagan was shot in the 1981 assassination attempt.)
- President: Ronald Reagan
- Preceded by: Jody Powell
- Succeeded by: Larry Speakes (acting)

Personal details
- Born: James Scott Brady; August 29, 1940 Centralia, Illinois, U.S.
- Died: August 4, 2014 (aged 73) Alexandria, Virginia, U.S.
- Cause of death: Gunshot wound
- Party: Republican
- Spouses: Sue Beh (m. 1960; div. 1967) Sarah Kemp (m. 1972)
- Children: 2
- Education: University of Illinois, Urbana-Champaign (BA)
- Nickname: Bear

James Scott Brady (August 29, 1940 – August 4, 2014) was an American journalist, politician, activist and American public official who served as assistant to the U.S. president and the 17th White House press secretary, serving under President Ronald Reagan. On March 30, 1981, John Hinckley Jr. shot and wounded Brady during Hinckley’s attempted assassination of Ronald Reagan, which occurred two months and 10 days after Reagan's inauguration.

Brady's death in 2014 was eventually ruled a homicide, caused by the gunshot wound he received 33 years earlier.

== Early career ==
Brady was born on August 29, 1940, in Centralia, Illinois. He was of Irish descent.

Brady began his career in public service as a staff member in the office of Republican Illinois senator Everett Dirksen. In 1964, he was the campaign manager for congressional candidate Wayne Jones in the race for Illinois's 23rd district. Six years later, Brady directed a campaign in the same district for Phyllis Schlafly.

Brady served in various positions in both the private sector and government, including service as special assistant to Secretary of Housing and Urban Development James Thomas Lynn; special assistant to the director of the Office of Management and Budget; assistant to the Secretary of Defense; and staff member of Senator William V. Roth, Jr. (R-DE). He served as press secretary in 1979 to presidential candidate John Connally.

After Connally withdrew his candidacy, Brady became the director of public affairs and research for the Reagan–Bush Committee, then spokesperson for the Office of the President-elect. After Reagan took office, Brady became White House press secretary.

== Shooting ==
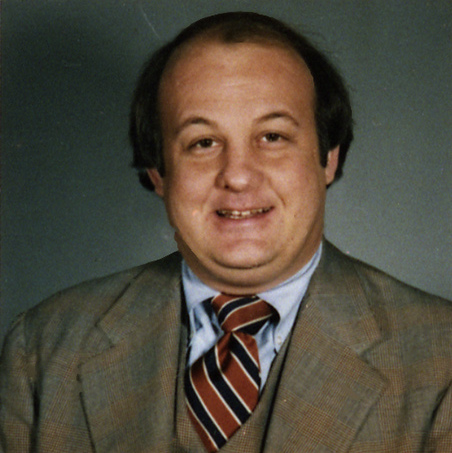
Official portrait, 1981

On March 30, 1981, 69 days into his presidency, Ronald Reagan and his cabinet members and staff, including Brady, were leaving the Washington Hilton hotel when a gunman opened fire at the president. The first of six bullets hit Brady. The gunman was 25-year-old John Hinckley Jr., who thought that killing the president would impress actress Jodie Foster, with whom Hinckley had an unhealthy obsession.

Secret Service and police officers forced Hinckley to the ground and arrested him. He had fired six shots from a .22 caliber Röhm RG-14 revolver. The bullet hit Brady in the head above his left eye, passing underneath his brain and shattering his brain cavity. Later shots also wounded Secret Service agent Tim McCarthy, Metropolitan Police officer Thomas Delahanty, and President Reagan himself, who was hit and seriously wounded by a bullet that ricocheted off the presidential limousine. Of the four men wounded, Brady suffered the worst injuries. He, Reagan, and McCarthy were taken to George Washington University Hospital in Washington, D.C.

During the confusion that ensued from the shooting, all major media outlets reported that Brady had died. At the time, he was 40 years old. When ABC News anchorman Frank Reynolds, a personal friend of Brady, was later forced to retract the report, he angrily said on-air to his staff, "C'mon, let's get it nailed down!", as a result of the miscommunication.

During the hours-long operation on Brady at the George Washington University Hospital, surgeon Arthur Kobrine was informed of the media's announcement of Brady's death, to which he said, "No one has told me and the patient."

Although Brady survived, the wound left him with brain damage, resulting in slurred speech and partial paralysis that required full-time use of a wheelchair. Kobrine, his neurosurgeon, described him as having difficulty controlling his emotions while speaking after the shooting, saying that "he would kind of cry-talk for a while", and having deficits in memory and thinking, such as failing to recognize people.

Brady was unable to work as White House press secretary but remained in the position until the end of the Reagan administration with Larry Speakes and Marlin Fitzwater performing the job on an "acting" or "deputy" basis.

== Gun control advocacy ==
With his wife Sarah Brady, who served as chairman of the Brady Campaign to Prevent Gun Violence, Brady lobbied for stricter handgun control and assault weapon restrictions. The Brady Handgun Violence Prevention Act, also known as "the Brady Bill", was named in his honor.

== Awards and honors ==
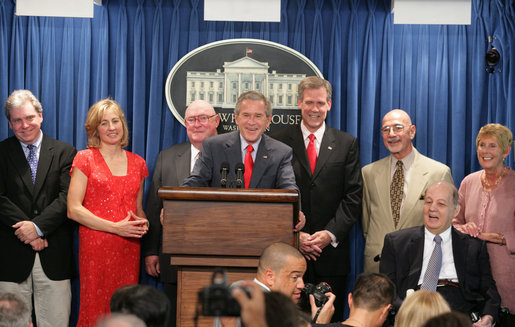
President George W. Bush hosts six White House Press Secretaries, including James Brady (second from the right) with his wife Sarah Brady (far right), before the Press Briefing Room underwent renovation, August 2, 2006.

Brady received an honorary degree of Doctor of Laws from McKendree College, Lebanon, Illinois in 1982. He and his wife, Sarah were each awarded a doctorate degree of Humane Letters by Drexel University in 1993.

They received the S. Roger Horchow Award for Greatest Public Service by a Private Citizen in 1994, which is given out annually by the Jefferson Awards Foundation. That same year, Brady received the Golden Plate Award of the American Academy of Achievement. He received the Presidential Medal of Freedom from President Bill Clinton in 1996, the highest civilian award in the United States.

The White House press briefing room was renamed the James S. Brady Press Briefing Room in his honor in 2000.

== Personal life ==
Brady married Sue Beh in 1960. The marriage ended in divorce seven years later. They had one daughter together. He married Sarah Jane Kemp in 1972 and they joined an Episcopal church. He had a son from his second marriage, born in 1978.

== Death ==
Brady died at age 73 on August 4, 2014, in Alexandria, Virginia. Four days later, the medical examiner ruled that his death was a homicide, caused by the gunshot wound and consequent brain damage that he sustained in 1981. Hinckley did not face any charges for Brady's death because he had been found not guilty by reason of insanity. In addition, since Brady's death occurred more than 33 years after the shooting, prosecution of Hinckley was barred under the year and a day law in effect in the District of Columbia at the time of the shooting.

In a June 2022 interview with CBS, Hinckley expressed remorse for his actions, and apologized to the Reagan and Brady families, as well as Jodie Foster.

== Portrayals in film ==
Brady's recovery after the shooting was dramatized in the 1991 HBO film Without Warning: The James Brady Story, with Brady portrayed by Beau Bridges. Brady was portrayed by John Connolly in the 2001 Showtime film The Day Reagan Was Shot. Michael H. Cole portrayed him in the 2016 television film Killing Reagan.

In 2013, Season 1, Episode 4, "In Control" of the television series The Americans takes place on the day of Reagan's assassination attempt, as the main characters try to figure out what is happening. The episode depicts the media misreporting Brady having died, before issuing the correction that he is still alive.

== Notes ==
Political offices
Preceded by Jody Powell	White House Press Secretary; 1981	Succeeded by Larry Speakes; Acting
