= Marlin Fitzwater =

American journalist (born 1942)

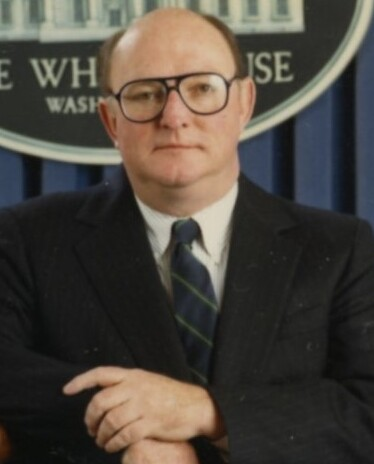
- Fitzwater in 1987

18th White House Press Secretary
- In office February 1, 1987 – January 20, 1993; Acting: February 1, 1987 – January 20, 1989
- President: Ronald Reagan; George H. W. Bush
- Preceded by: Larry Speakes (acting)
- Succeeded by: Dee Dee Myers

Personal details
- Born: Max Marlin Fitzwater; November 24, 1942 (age 83) Salina, Kansas, U.S.
- Party: Republican
- Education: Kansas State University (BA)

Military service
- Allegiance: United States
- Branch/service: United States Air Force
- Unit: Air National Guard

Max Marlin Fitzwater (born November 24, 1942) is an American writer-journalist who served as the 18th White House Press Secretary from 1987 to 1993 under U.S. presidents Ronald Reagan and George H. W. Bush. He is the only U.S. Press Secretary to be appointed by two different U.S. Presidents (Stephen Early and Pierre Salinger served as transition press secretaries for a few weeks and a few months, respectively).

== Early life and education ==
Fitzwater was born in a Salina, Kansas hospital; his family's farm was in Dickinson County. He attended school in Abilene, Kansas from kindergarten to his graduation in 1960. He received a degree in journalism from Kansas State University in 1965. Fitzwater became a member of Delta Tau Delta fraternity. While in school, he worked at newspapers (Lindsborg News Record, Abilene Reflector-Chronicle, Manhattan Mercury, and Topeka Capital Journal) in various Kansas communities before moving to Washington, D.C. upon graduation.

In 1966, Fitzwater joined the District of Columbia Air National Guard and served in munitions maintenance as an airman third class in the 113th Tactical Fighter Wing at Andrews Air Force Base. He spent two years on active duty from 1968 to 1970 with service at Homestead Air Force Base, MacDill Air Force Base, Myrtle Beach Air Force Base.

== Career in the government ==
In Washington, Fitzwater served at various federal agencies, including the Appalachian Regional Commission (1965–67), the U.S. Department of Transportation (1970–72), and the Environmental Protection Agency (1972–80). He was the spokesman who explained the toxic waste disposal problem in America and developed the public information activities related to disaster sites like Love Canal in New York State. Fitzwater was named Outstanding Civil Servant in government in 1980. He served as Deputy Assistant Secretary for Public Affairs at the Department of the Treasury from 1981 to 1982.

Fitzwater headed to the White House in 1983 and served until 1993: He served in the Reagan White House as president's spokesman under the title Assistant to the President for Press Relations from 1987 to 1989, until Reagan left office in 1989. He served under George H. W. Bush as Assistant to the President and Press Secretary, later as communications director "Counselor to the President President Bush, until Bush left office in 1993.

== Assistant to the President for Press Relations under Reagan ==
When James Brady was shot in the assassination attempt on President Reagan on March 30, 1981, Brady was unable to return to work, though he retained the title of Press Secretary for the duration of Reagan's term.

Fitzwater served as the president's spokesman during this period, under the title of Assistant to the President for Press Relations. He served in this capacity until Reagan left office in 1989.

When Mikhail Gorbachev first visited the United States, in Reagan's first term, Fitzwater gave joint press briefings with his Soviet counterpart. Over 7,000 journalists attended them.

== Press Secretary under George H. W. Bush ==
When George H. W. Bush took over as president in 1989, Fitzwater was again tapped to be the presidential spokesman, this time with the title of Assistant to the President and Press Secretary. Later in the administration, Fitzwater became communications director for about a year under the title Counselor to the President.

== Later years ==
Fitzwater was awarded the Presidential Citizens Medal, the nation's second-highest civilian award, in 1992.

He worked on The West Wing as a writer-consultant for two seasons.

In 2002, he founded the Marlin Fitzwater Center for Communication at Franklin Pierce University in Rindge, New Hampshire.

== Personal life ==
Fitzwater married Melinda Andrews in 1999. He was previously married to Linda Kraus, with whom he has two children, Bradley and Courtney. He lives in Deale, Maryland, a village on the Chesapeake Bay.

Fitzwater has been profiled numerous times on television and has appeared on Meet the Press, Face the Nation, Larry King Live, and nearly all national news broadcasts.

== Works ==
External videos
- Booknotes interview with Fitzwater on Call the Briefing!, November 5, 1995, C-SPAN

=== Nonfiction ===
- Fitzwater, Marlin. Calm Before The Storm: Desert Storm Diaries and Other Stories. Sea Hill Press, 2019. (ISBN 978-1-937720-47-6)
- Call the Briefing! is a best-selling memoir of ten years in the White House; called the textbook of White House press relations.
- Fitzwater, Marlin. Call the Briefing!: Bush and Reagan, Sam and Helen: A Decade with Presidents and the Press. Holbrook, MA: Adams Media, 1996. ISBN 9781558506374.

=== Fiction ===
- Lawson, Robert with Marlin Fitzwater. Empires Fall. A stage play about President George H. W. Bush and Gen. Secretary Mikhail Gorbachev. 2001.
- Fitzwater, Marlin. Esther's Pillow: A Novel PublicAffairs, 2001. ISBN 978-1586480356
- Fitzwater, Marlin. Death in the Polka Dot Shoes CCB Publishing; 1 edition (July 1, 2011) CCB Publishing; 1 edition (July 1, 2011)

Political offices
Preceded by Larry Speakes; Acting	White House Press Secretary; 1987–1993; Acting: 1987–1989	Succeeded by Dee Dee Myers
