= Second Amendment Sisters =

American women's gun rights advocacy organization

- Formation: 1999
- Dissolved: 2015; 11 years ago
- Website: www.2asisters.org

Second Amendment Sisters, Inc. (SAS) was a United States women's gun rights advocacy group that supported gun use for self defense and empowerment. According to a 2003 Los Angeles Times article, SAS was founded in December 1999 by five women who were "outraged" by the Million Mom March. The national organization closed in 2015, though individual state chapters continue to operate independently.

== See also ==
- Gun politics in the US
- Second Amendment to the United States Constitution
