= Dan Gross (activist) =

American gun control activist

- Citizenship: United States
- Education: Tulane University (B.S.)
- Employer: Brady Campaign to Prevent Gun Violence
- Known for: Center to Prevent Youth Violence; Brady Campaign to Prevent Gun Violence

Dan Gross is the former President of the Brady Campaign to Prevent Gun Violence. He was appointed to this position on February 28, 2012, subsequent to the Brady Campaign's merger with The Center to Prevent Youth Violence. This position ended in 2017.

== Early life ==
Dan previously co-founded and directed the Center to Prevent Youth Violence (CPYV) (formerly known as PAX). He became an activist on the issue of gun violence when his brother was shot and severely wounded in the 1997 Empire State Building shooting. Prior to his activism on gun violence, Dan was a partner at JWT Advertising Agency in New York City. There he managed accounts such as Kodak, Lipton and Warner Lambert.

Dan graduated from Tulane University in New Orleans with a Bachelor of Science in Psychology and a minor in Economics.

== Activism ==
The Brady Campaign was named after Sarah and Jim Brady. They worked through the late 1980s and early 1990s to institute the system of background checks in the United States. As the President of the Brady Campaign, Dan Gross worked closely with the White House and Congress on the set of comprehensive legislation they proposed after the Newtown shooting. Although legislation requiring new expanded background checks before gun purchases failed to pass in the U.S. Senate in April 2013, Gross and the Brady Campaign continue to promote legislation to prevent gun violence. Throughout his career as an advocate, Gross has also worked to address gun violence as a public health and safety issue through the ASK (Asking Saves Kids) campaign and related programs. As President of the Brady Campaign, Gross has also overseen lawsuits and other measures to combat irresponsible conduct by small numbers of gun sellers that disproportionately supply guns recovered in connection to crime.

Since the Newtown, CT shooting, Dan Gross has appeared on numerous news shows and participated in many press conferences on this issue. Some believe that public consensus has shifted since 2013 to support the positions that Gross and Brady Campaign have taken on gun violence prevention. In January 2016, Gross and the Brady Campaign supported executive actions by President Barack Obama to reduce illegal sales of guns without background checks. During the 2016 Democratic Presidential primaries, Dan Gross campaigned on behalf of candidate Hillary Clinton at events in Iowa and South Carolina, the site of a mass shooting by a White supremacist in 2015. In February 2016, Gross spoke on gun violence prevention and the politics around it at the annual TED conference.
