= Brady Campaign =

American nonprofit gun control organization

Brady: United Against Gun Violence
- Formation: 1974; 52 years ago
- Type: Political lobbying group
- Tax ID no.: 23-7321017
- Legal status: 501(c)(4) organization
- Headquarters: Washington, D.C., U.S.
- Coordinates: 38.9011872°N 77.0065122°W
- Region served: United States
- President: Kris Brown
- Board Chair: Kevin Quinn
- Revenue: $62,100,000 (2025)
- Expenses: $60,000,000 (2025)
- Website: www.bradyunited.org
- Formerly called: National Council to Control Handguns (NCCH) (1974-1980); Handgun Control, Inc. (HCI) (1980-2000); Brady Campaign to Prevent Gun Violence (2000-2009)

Brady: United Against Gun Violence (formerly Handgun Control, Inc., the Brady Campaign to Prevent Gun Violence and the Brady Center to Prevent Gun Violence) is an American nonprofit organization that advocates for gun control and against gun violence. It is named after former White House press secretary James Brady, who was permanently disabled and later died in 2014 as a result of the Ronald Reagan assassination attempt of 1981, and his wife Sarah Brady. Sarah was a chairwoman of the organization from 1989 until her death in 2015.

Brady was founded in 1974 as the National Council to Control Handguns (NCCH). From 1980 through 2000, it operated under the name Handgun Control, Inc. (HCI). In 2001, it was renamed the Brady Campaign to Prevent Gun Violence, and its sister project, the Center to Prevent Handgun Violence, was renamed the Brady Center to Prevent Gun Violence. The nonprofits rebranded as Brady in February 2019, on the 25th anniversary of the implementation of the Brady Bill.

== History ==
In 1974, the National Council to Control Handguns (NCCH) was founded by armed-robbery victim Mark Borinsky, a graduate of Johns Hopkins University. In 1975, Republican marketing manager Pete Shields, whose 23-year-old son had been murdered, joined NCCH as chairman. In 1980, the organization became Handgun Control, Inc. (HCI) and partnered with the National Coalition to Ban Handguns (NCBH). The partnership did not last long; the NCBH, renamed in 1990 as the Coalition to Stop Gun Violence (CSGV), generally advocates for stricter gun laws than does the Brady Campaign.

HCI had few resources until 1980, after the murder of musician John Lennon increased the public's interest in shootings. By 1981, HCI's membership exceeded 100,000. In 1983, the center to Prevent Handgun Violence (CPHV) was founded as an educational outreach organization and sister project. In 1989, CPHV established the Legal Action Project to press its agenda in the courts.

In 2001, Handgun Control, Inc. was renamed the Brady Campaign to Prevent Gun Violence, and the center to Prevent Handgun Violence was renamed the Brady Center to Prevent Handgun Violence, in honor of both Jim and Sarah Brady. The same year, the Million Mom March (MMM) was incorporated into the Brady Campaign.

== Leadership ==
=== Current ===
In September 2017, Kris Brown and Avery W. Gardiner assumed the roles of co-president, replacing Dan Gross. Brown was named the organization's sole president in November 2018. Liz Dunning is the vice president for development.

=== Former ===
Mark Borinsky founded the National Council to Control Handguns in 1974. He served as chair until 1976. Charlie Orasin was a key player in the founding and growth of Handgun Control (HCI). He worked at HCI from 1975 until 1992.

Nelson "Pete" Shields became the organization's chairman in 1978 and retired in 1989. In July 1976, Shields estimated that it would take seven to ten years for NCCH to reach the goal of "total control of handguns in the United States." He said: "The first problem is to slow down the increasing number of handguns being produced and sold in this country. The second is to get handguns registered. And the final problem is to make the possession of all handguns and all handgun ammunition – except for the military, policemen, licensed security guards, licensed sporting clubs, and licensed gun collectors – totally illegal." In 1987 Shields said that he believed "in the right of law-abiding citizens to possess handguns... for legitimate purposes.".

Richard Aborn served as president from 1992 until 1996 and went on to form the Citizens Crime Commission of New York City.

Jim and Sarah Brady were both influential in the movement since at least the mid-1980s. Mrs. Brady became chair in 1989, and the Bradys became the namesakes of the organization in 2000.

Former Maryland congressman Michael D. Barnes was the president of the Brady Campaign from 2000 to May 2006.

Former Fort Wayne, Indiana, mayor Paul Helmke served from July 2006 to July 2011. In November 2008, Brady president Helmke, a former Republican mayor of Fort Wayne, Indiana, endorsed the American Hunters and Shooters Association saying, "I see our issues as complementary to theirs." He said, "The Brady Campaign is not just East Coast liberal Democrats."

Dan Gross was president from February 2012 to September 2017. He is one of the founders of the Center to Prevent Youth Violence (formerly PAX).

== Political advocacy ==
Brady Campaign to Prevent Gun Violence 2009 Brady Campaign State Scorecard 75–100, Most restrictive 50–74 25–49 11–24 0-10, Least restrictive

=== Undetectable Firearms Act ===
In 1988, HCI supported Congress in passing the Undetectable Firearms Act, which banned the manufacture, possession and transfer of firearms with less than 3.7 oz of metal, after the emergence of "plastic" handguns like Glock pistols.

Critics said that so-called "plastic" handguns contain many metal components (such as the slide, barrel and ammunition) and can be detected by conventional screening technologies. Their response was to say the type of polymer used in the firearms is opaque to X-ray scanners, which would've hidden the metal components.

=== Brady Law ===
HCI was the chief supporter of the Brady Handgun Violence Prevention Act, commonly known as the Brady Law, enacted in 1993 after a seven-year debate. It successfully lobbied for passage of the Federal Assault Weapons Ban, banning the manufacture and importation of so-called military-style assault weapons.

=== Castle and stand-your-ground laws ===
In May 2005, Florida passed a stand-your-ground law that authorized persons attacked in any place they were lawfully present to use lethal force in self-defense without a duty to retreat. Brady Campaign workers passed out fliers at Miami International Airport offering tips like "Do not argue unnecessarily with local people." The group also published ads in The Boston Globe, The Chicago Tribune, and The Detroit Free Press saying: "Thinking about a Florida vacation? Please ensure your family is safe." In 2006, when similar laws were enacted or proposed in other states, the Brady Campaign and other critics warned they could result in vigilantism.

=== Heller and McDonald cases ===
After the U.S. Supreme Court ruling in 2010 in McDonald v. Chicago, Brady president Paul Helmke said he was "pleased that the Court reaffirmed its language in District of Columbia v. Heller that the Second Amendment individual right to possess guns in the home for self-defense does not prevent our elected representatives from enacting 'common-sense' gun laws to protect our communities from gun violence."

=== Lawsuits ===
On March 19, 2009, a federal judge ordered a temporary injunction blocking the implementation of the rule allowing concealed carry permit holders to carry firearms concealed within National Park Service lands within states where their permits are valid, based upon environmental concerns, in response to efforts by the Brady Campaign to Prevent Gun Violence, the National Parks Conservation Association, and the Coalition of National Park Service Retirees. On May 20, 2009, the injunction was overturned by the passing of an amendment to the Credit CARD Act of 2009, added by Senator Tom Coburn (R, OK) over the objections of the Brady Campaign.

=== Sandy Hook school shooting aftermath ===
In the month after the Sandy Hook Elementary School shooting, the Brady Campaign raised about $5 million and renewed public interest in passing legislation to reduce gun violence. The Brady Campaign has continued to promote federal reform legislation, including an expansion of the national background check program. Its leadership met with President Obama and Vice President Biden to craft a package of bills aimed at reducing gun violence.

=== Theater shooting in Aurora, Colorado ===
In 2014, the parent and step-parent of one of the victims of the 2012 Aurora theater shooting, represented by Brady Center lawyers, filed suit against the companies from whom James Holmes purchased the ammunition, magazines, and body armor he used in the shooting. In 2015, the judge in the case dismissed the suit on the grounds that such a lawsuit is in violation of both Colorado law and the federal Protection of Lawful Commerce in Arms Act because the guns and ammunition obtained from the online companies, including Lucky Gunner and The Sportsman's Guide, worked as claimed. He also ordered the plaintiffs to pay the legal costs of the defendants, which came to $280,000. As the Brady Center lawyers would be expected to know applicable case law in such a lawsuit, it is not clear whether the Brady Center or the plaintiffs themselves are responsible for paying the judgment.

=== Assault weapons ===
The Brady Campaign contends that self-loading and select-fire weapons are virtually identical since a semi-automatic rifle may be fired rapidly.

In December 2025, Brady Campaign released a statement against the Trump Administration Department of Justice for suing the city of Washington, DC over the assault weapons ban.

== See also ==
- Denying Firearms and Explosives to Dangerous Terrorists Act of 2007
- James Gowda, "largest gun-trafficking case" as of 2000
