= Million Mom March =

American gun control advocacy group

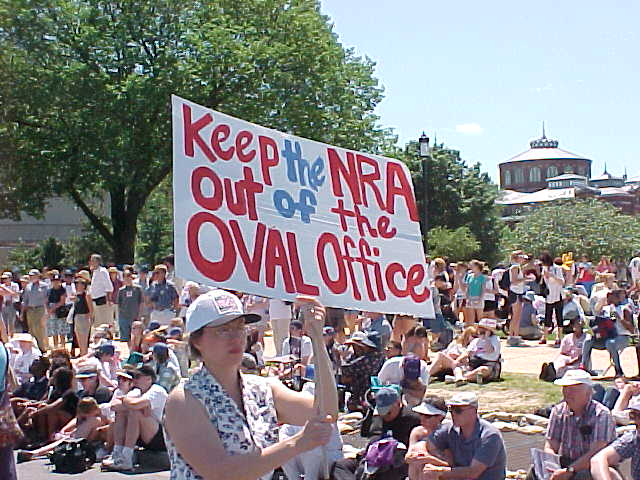
Demonstrator with sign

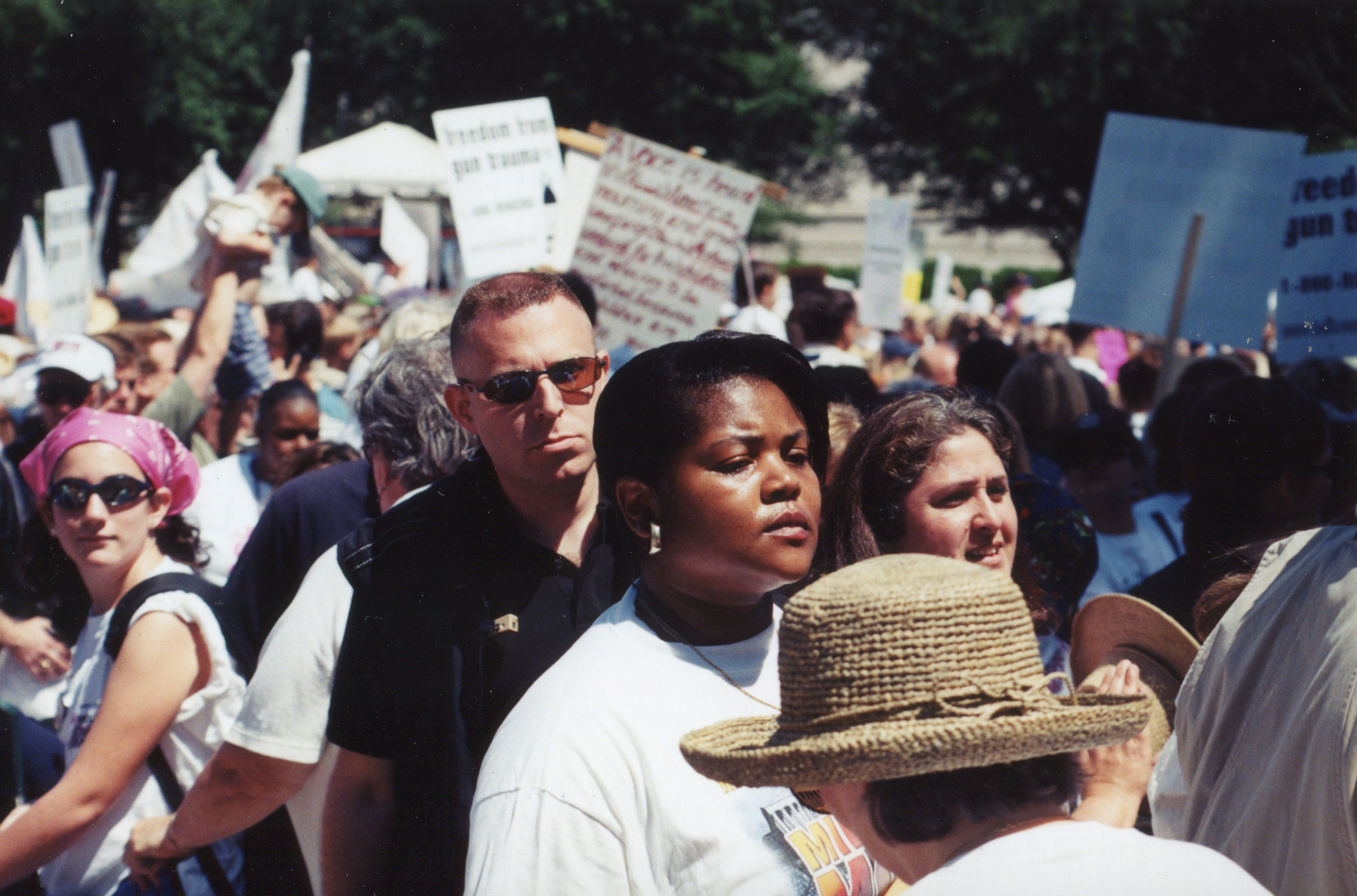
Demonstrators at the march

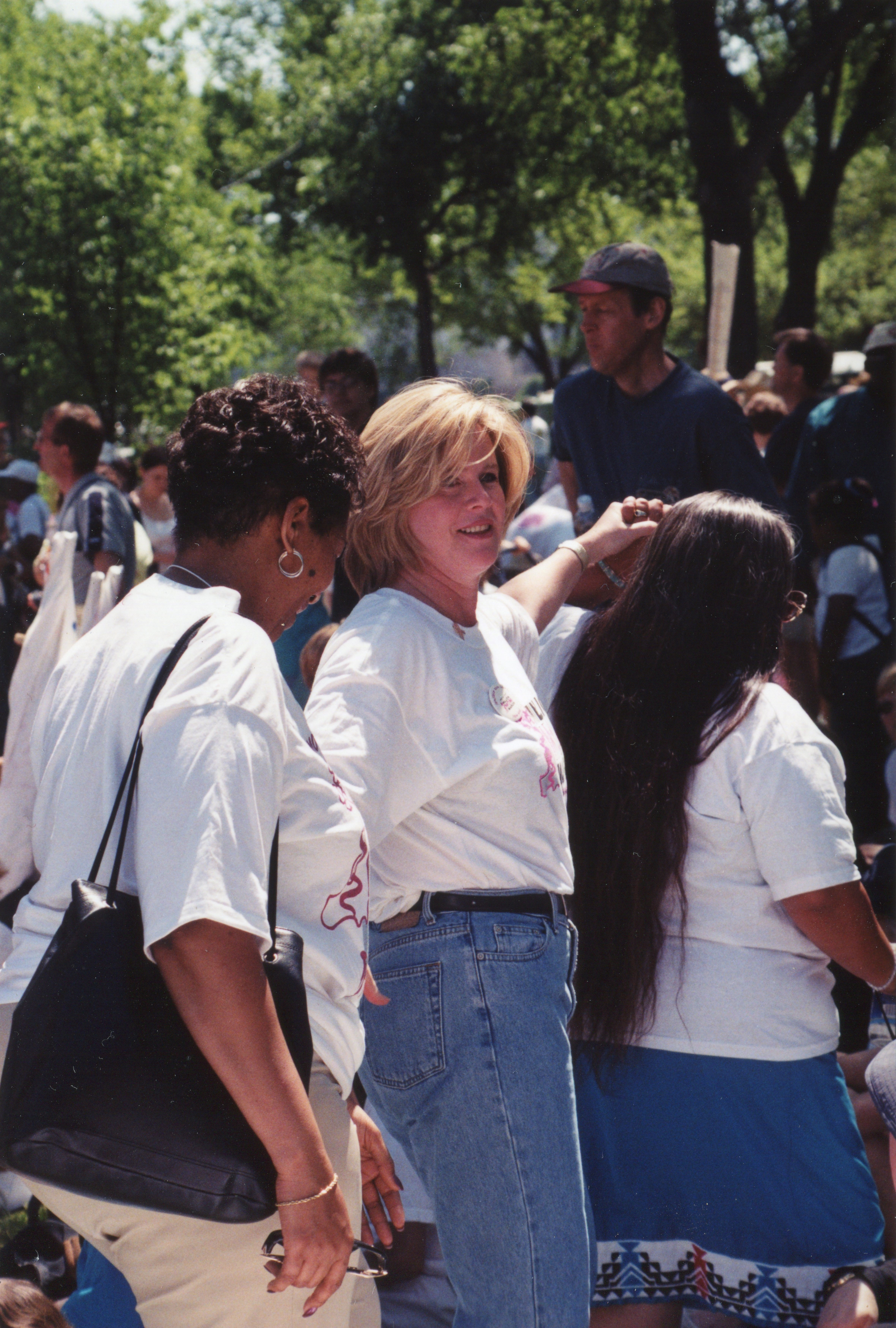
Tipper Gore at the march

The Million Mom March was a rally held on Mother's Day, May 14, 2000, in the Washington, D.C. National Mall by the Million Mom March organization to call for stricter gun control. The march reportedly drew an estimated attendance of 500,000 to 750,000 people at the D.C. location, however, "The Park Police estimated turnout for that event at 300,000." Including 150,000 to 200,000 people holding satellite events in more than 70 cities across the country, the total number of participants was about one million. A counter-rally by the pro-firearm Second Amendment Sisters, was also held on the same day and also drew some people.

== History ==
The Million Mom March began as a grassroots movement sparked by Donna Dees-Thomases after she viewed broadcast coverage of the Los Angeles Jewish Community Center shooting in Granada Hills, California. In October 1999, she and several Tri-State activists from the New York metropolitan area held a news conference in Manhattan, where they announced their intent to march in Washington. The march was held on May 14, 2000 to coincide with Mother's Day, with the organization reporting a turnout of 750,000 supporters. Following the event the organization became chapter-based and merged with the victim-led pro-gun control group Bell Campaign. In 2001 the Million Mom March organization merged with the Brady Campaign.

On the anniversary of the first march, more than 100 rallies were held across the nation calling for stricter gun laws at the state level. In New York, Republican Governor George Pataki joined Democratic U.S. Senator Hillary Clinton in a show of support for stricter gun laws. Turnouts to the second Washington march and to further marches were diminished, with the 2001 march on Washington reporting about 200 in attendance. The group did not plan demonstrations in Washington in 2002 or 2003, instead focusing its efforts in the states.

== Debate ==
Gun rights advocates have routinely challenged the Million Mom March on its use of statistics on child gun casualties with individuals and organizations on both sides of the gun debate either verifying or criticizing the group's data. In 2004, Wendy McElroy estimated that only 5,732 children under the age of 17 died in gun related deaths, "or roughly 40 percent of what MMM asserts."

An investigation by The New York Times reported that the incidence of accidental child firearm deaths occur "roughly twice as often as the records indicate" due to idiosyncrasies in how authorities in various states classify these incidents. The report also asserted that the National Rifle Association and other gun rights groups utilize the lower statistics in order to lobby against more restrictive gun laws.

== See also ==
- Culture wars
- Gun politics in the United States
- List of rallies and protest marches in Washington, D.C.
- March for Our Lives
- Moms Demand Action
