= Citizens Crime Commission of New York City =

Non-profit organisation

- Formation: 1978
- Type: Nonprofit organization Nonpartisan
- Headquarters: New York, NY, United States
- President: Richard Aborn
- Key people: Ashley Cannon; Roberta Liggett; Stephanie Ueberall; Ina Wanca
- Revenue: $516,213 (2014)
- Expenses: $412,190 (2014)
- Website: www.nycrimecommission.org

The Citizens Crime Commission of New York City (Crime Commission) is an independent, non-profit, nonpartisan organization focused on criminal justice and public safety policy reform.

The Crime Commission’s recent education and advocacy efforts have focused on supporting the greater use of DNA evidence in crime fighting, highlighting the changing nature of the threat of terrorism, and developing interventions against gun violence.

== President ==
Richard Aborn serves as president of the Citizens Crime Commission of New York City. In addition to his service to the Crime Commission, Mr. Aborn is president of Constantine Aborn Advisory Services, LLC (CAAS). He is also one of the managing partners of the law firm Constantine Cannon, and is on the board of New Yorkers Against Gun Violence, Harlem Mothers SAVE, Westside Crime Prevention Council, CASES, the Tannenbaum Center and PBS-WLIW.
