= Richard Aborn =

American lawyer

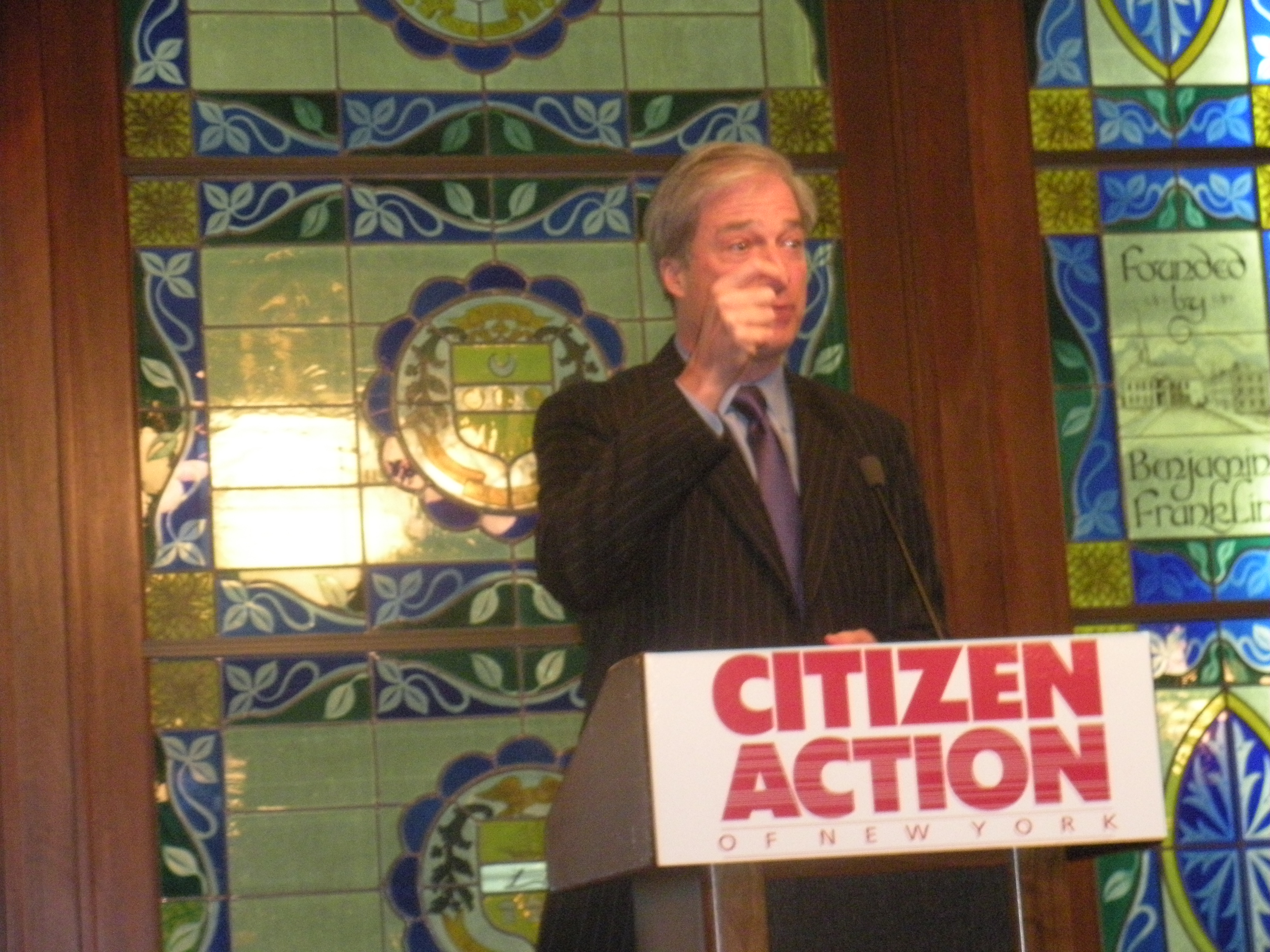
- Born: September 2, 1952 (age 74)

Richard Aborn (born September 2, 1952) is the president of the Citizens Crime Commission of New York City, a partner in the law firm Constantine Cannon, and the managing director of Constantine & Aborn Advisory Services (CAAS) where he works with large urban police departments and criminal justice agencies in the United States and Europe.

== Biography ==
Aborn was born in New York in 1952 and attended the University of Dubuque before studying at John Marshall Law School.

While on leave from his position in 2009 he was a candidate for Manhattan District Attorney. His list of endorsements included Congressman Jerry Nadler, Congresswoman Carolyn McCarthy, State Senators Eric Schneiderman and Eric Adams, Assemblypersons Jonathan Bing, Deborah Glick, Richard Gottfried, Brian Kavanagh, Daniel O'Donnell, Linda Rosenthal and Michelle Schimel, and gun control organizations the Brady Campaign, Gun Free Kids, Million Mom March and New Yorkers Against Gun Violence. He lost the election to Cy Vance.

In 1979 Aborn became an assistant district attorney in the Manhattan District Attorney's office under Robert M. Morgenthau. In the District Attorney's office he prosecuted felonies, including homicides, until 1984 when he began the law firm of Aborn and Anesi.

From 1992 to 1996 Aborn served as the president of Handgun Control Inc. (now the Brady Campaign) and was a principal strategist behind the passing of the Brady Handgun Violence Prevention Act as well as the Federal Assault Weapons Ban. Aborn also served as the president of the center to Prevent Handgun Violence.

In 1999 Aborn was commissioned by the New York City Public Advocate to conduct an investigation of the NYPD's disciplinary system and its response to civilian complaints of misconduct. On behalf of the Public Advocate, he also investigated NYPD's disciplinary decisions in the fatal shooting of Amadou Diallo.

In 2001 Aborn served as the senior law enforcement advisor to the Democratic mayoral nominee. During that campaign he developed criminal justice policies for New York City including the establishment of a "311" program which Mayor Michael Bloomberg implemented.
