= The Center to Prevent Youth Violence =

American gun violence prevention organization

The Center to Prevent Youth Violence (CPYV), originally known as PAX, was a non-profit organization co-founded in 1998 by Daniel Gross and Talmage Cooley, seeking to end gun violence in America.

In 2011, PAX changed its name to The Center to Prevent Youth Violence. The organization merged with the Brady Campaign in 2012. While Talmage Cooley remained on the organization's Board of Trustees until the merger, Daniel Gross became President of the Brady Campaign .

== Parent-focused programs ==
CPYV created two parent-focused programs aimed at educating parents about simple steps they can take to reduce the risk of violence affecting their children.

=== ASK ===
The ASK campaign launched in 2000 in partnership with the American Academy of Pediatrics. The campaign aimed to inform and inspire parents to ask about the presence of firearms in the homes where their children play (i.e. the homes of friends and relatives).

In October 2017, the US Government Accountability Office (GAO) released a report after evaluating 16 programs, and found the ASK program to be the only national program that effectively promoted awareness of safe storage.

=== Suicide-Proof Your Home ===
The Suicide-Proofing Initiative was launched in September 2011 in partnership with the Rhode Island Department of Health under a youth suicide prevention grant from SAMHSA. This program was based on research conducted by the Harvard School of Public Health, which illustrated that preventing youth access to lethal means of suicide reduces the likelihood that a young person will die from suicide.

== Youth-focused programs ==
CPYV believes that young people have the power to prevent violence. The SPEAK UP campaign and hotline give youth the tools and motivation to help keep their communities safe.

=== Speak Up ===
The Speak Up Campaign (and its hotline) was launched in 2002 based on the insight that young people who are not involved in violence often have information regarding impending violence. Speak Up encouraged youth to “speak up” about threats of violence they hear about, either by telling an adult who can help or by calling its anonymous, national hotline. The Speak Up program, including its hotline, was discontinued on December 31, 2018.
