= Creative Coalition =

American entertainment industry advocacy group

The Creative Coalition
- Founded: 1989 by Ron Silver
- Type: Non-profit; NGO
- Location: United States
- Fields: Media attention, direct-appeal campaigns, research, lobbying
- Key people: Tim Daly (president, 2008–present), Robin Bronk (CEO, 2010–present)
- Website: thecreativecoalition.org

The Creative Coalition (TCC) is a 501(c)(3) nonprofit advocacy group consisting of members of the American entertainment industry. The organization was founded in 1989 by Ron Silver. Tim Daly serves as the organization's president. Members have included Christopher Reeve, Ron Reagan, Blair Brown, Michael J. Fuchs, Alec Baldwin, Joe Pantoliano, Stephen Collins, and Wayne Knight. The coalition addresses both industry-related issues and general social issues. The group educates leaders in the arts community on issues of public importance, specifically in the areas of First Amendment rights, arts advocacy and public education.

The group has sponsored benefit galas at both Democratic and Republican conventions, raising nearly $1.8 million during the 2004 presidential campaign. It does not contribute to political campaigns directly, instead employing lobbying firm Quinn Gillespie & Associates to advance its political interests.
