= Sarah Brady =

American gun-control advocate (1942–2015)

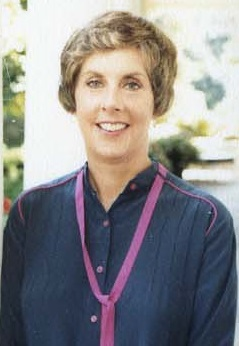
- Brady in 1984
- Born: Sarah Jane Kemp; February 6, 1942; Kirksville, Missouri, US
- Died: April 3, 2015 (aged 73); Alexandria, Virginia, US
- Education: College of William & Mary
- Occupation: Gun control advocate
- Years active: 1986–2015
- Spouse: James Brady (m. 1972; died 2014)

Sarah Jane Brady (née Kemp; February 6, 1942 – April 3, 2015) was an American gun control advocate. Her husband, James Brady, was press secretary to U.S. president Ronald Reagan and was left permanently disabled as a result of an assassination attempt on Reagan.

== Life ==
She was born Sarah Jane Kemp in Kirksville, Missouri, to L. Stanley Kemp, a high school teacher and later FBI agent, and Frances (née Stufflebean) Kemp, a former teacher and homemaker. She had a younger brother, Bill. She was raised in Alexandria, Virginia, where she graduated from Francis C. Hammond High School in 1959.

She graduated from the College of William & Mary in 1964. From 1964 to 1968 she was a public school teacher in Virginia. She married James Brady in Alexandria on July 21, 1973. On December 29, 1978, their only child, James "Scott" Brady Jr., was born.

From 1968 to 1970 she worked as assistant to the campaign director for the National Republican Congressional Committee. She then worked as an administrative aide, first for Mike McKevitt (R-CO) and then for Joseph J. Maraziti (R-NJ). From 1974 to 1978, she worked as director of administration and coordinator of field services for the Republican National Committee.

Her husband sustained a permanently disabling head wound during the attempted assassination of Ronald Reagan, which occurred on March 30, 1981. James Brady remained as Press Secretary for the remainder of Reagan's administration, primarily in a titular role.

Alongside her husband, Sarah Brady became "one of the nation's leading crusaders for gun control". They later became active in the lobbying organization Handgun Control, Inc. that would eventually be renamed the Brady Campaign to Prevent Gun Violence. She was chairwoman of the Brady Campaign from 2000 until her death in 2015.

In 1994, she and her husband received the S. Roger Horchow Award for Greatest Public Service by a Private Citizen, an award given out annually by Jefferson Awards. In 1994, she and her husband received the Golden Plate Award of the American Academy of Achievement.

== Death ==
Sarah Brady died at the age of 73 on April 3, 2015, in Alexandria, Virginia, from pneumonia. Her husband James had died at the same age in the previous year, on August 4, 2014.

== Book ==
External videos
- Booknotes interview with Brady on A Good Fight, May 5, 2002., C-SPAN

In 2002, Sarah Brady published her autobiography, A Good Fight. According to Library Journal, it is more about her personal battles and her determination and courage than about gun control.

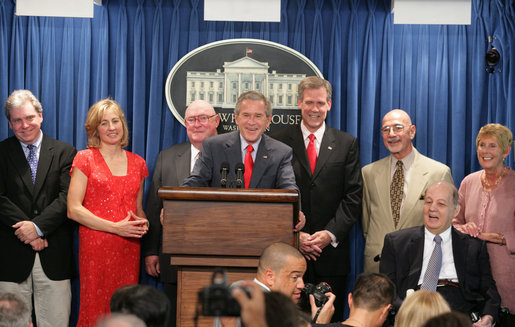
President George W. Bush hosts six White House Press Secretaries, including James Brady (second from the right) with his wife Sarah Brady (far right), before the Press Briefing Room underwent renovation, August 2, 2006.

In April 2002, Court TV announced a planned television movie adaptation of the book, to be produced in conjunction with Hearst Entertainment. At the book's launch, Bill Clinton praised her for having "given the gift of life to countless thousands and thousands of Americans".

The book gives an "intimate" look at her public and personal life, including a "detailed, suspenseful account" of the efforts to pass the Brady Bill, according to Publishers Weekly, which suggested that "fans of [Katharine] Graham's Personal History may enjoy this story of a determined woman in a male-dominated Washington."

Kirkus Reviews called it "spirited," portraying Brady as a "scrapper" who never gives up, despite her husband's injury, her son's medical problems, and her own battle with smoking and lung cancer.
