= Larry Speakes =

Former White House spokesman

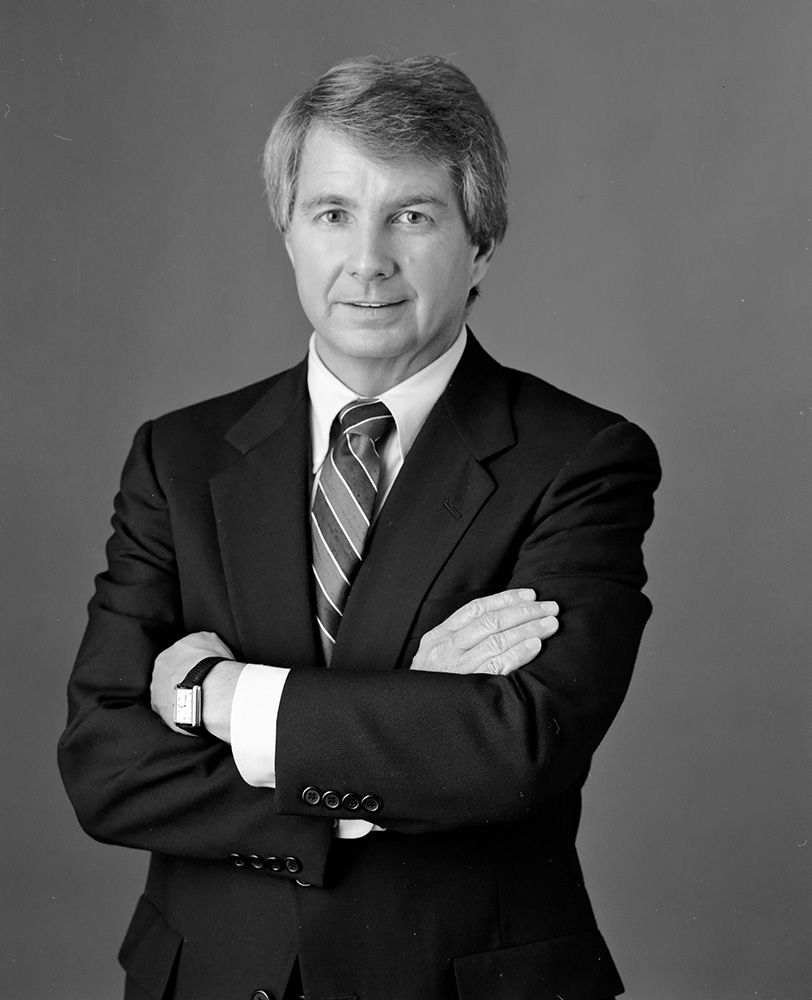
- Speakes in 1983

Acting White House Press Secretary
- In office March 30, 1981 – February 1, 1987
- President: Ronald Reagan
- Preceded by: James Brady
- Succeeded by: Marlin Fitzwater (acting)

Personal details
- Born: Larry Melvin Speakes; September 13, 1939 Cleveland, Mississippi, U.S.
- Died: January 10, 2014 (aged 74) Cleveland, Mississippi, U.S.
- Party: Democratic (before 1974); Republican (1974–2014)
- Spouse(s): Laura Crawford; Betty Robinson; Aleta Sindelar
- Children: 3
- Education: University of Mississippi (BA)

Larry Melvin Speakes (September 13, 1939 – January 10, 2014) was an American journalist and spokesperson who acted as White House Press Secretary under President Ronald Reagan from 1981 to 1987. He assumed the role after Press Secretary James Brady was shot on March 30, 1981.

Speakes was a native of northwest Mississippi and attended the University of Mississippi. He worked as a journalist in the 1960s until he became press secretary for Democratic Senator James Eastland in 1968. In this position he also worked as the spokesman for the United States Senate Committee on the Judiciary.

In 1974, he became a Staff Assistant for President Richard Nixon and soon became the Press Secretary to the Special Counsel to the President at the height of the Watergate scandal. Upon Nixon's resignation, President Gerald Ford appointed Speakes to be Assistant Press Secretary to the President. Speakes served as Bob Dole's press secretary during his unsuccessful vice-presidential run with Ford. He worked for the international public relations firm of Hill & Knowlton until joining the Reagan administration.

== Early life ==
Speakes was born in Cleveland in northwestern Mississippi, which had the nearest hospital to his parents' middle-class home in Merigold in Bolivar County. His father, Harry Earl Speakes, was a banker. His mother was the former Ethlyn Frances Fincher.

== Early career ==
=== Mississippi newspaperman ===
Speakes received a Bachelor of Arts degree in journalism from the University of Mississippi in Oxford. He served as editor of the Oxford Eagle in 1961, and thereafter as managing editor of the Bolivar Commercial in Cleveland from 1962 to 1966. From 1966 to 1968, he worked as general manager and editor of Progress Publishers of Leland, Mississippi.

=== Senate press secretary ===
Speakes headed to Washington, D.C. in 1968, serving as press secretary to Democratic Senator James Eastland of Mississippi. In this capacity, he worked as spokesman for the United States Senate Committee on the Judiciary and a coordinator of the senator's reelection campaign in 1972 against the Republican Gil Carmichael.

=== Work in the White House ===
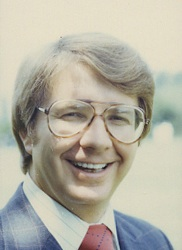
Speakes in 1976

The White House tapped Speakes in 1974 as a Staff Assistant and soon became the Press Secretary to the Special Counsel to the President at the height of the Watergate scandal. Upon Nixon's resignation, President Ford appointed Speakes to be Assistant Press Secretary to the President. Speakes served as Bob Dole's press secretary during his unsuccessful vice-presidential run with Ford.

After briefly serving as President Ford's personal press secretary in 1977, Speakes ventured into the private sector as vice president of the international public relations firm of Hill & Knowlton until 1981. After the 1980 presidential campaign, he worked on the staff of the Reagan-Bush team, helping to "straighten out" the press operation, eventually becoming deputy spokesman for the President-elect during the transition. Before the 1988 presidential election, Speakes had considered working for the campaigns of George H. W. Bush, Jack Kemp, and Alexander Haig; however, Bush's people never got back to him, Speakes decided that Kemp was "too hot" (meaning too quick with an answer) for television, and was advised by another Washington insider, "You can do that [join the Haig team] if you want to, but let me tell you one thing: Al Haig ain't going to be President." Speakes has received criticism over the years for his public missives of the HIV/AIDS epidemic, which first became present in the United States during his tenure at the White House.

== Presidential spokesman ==
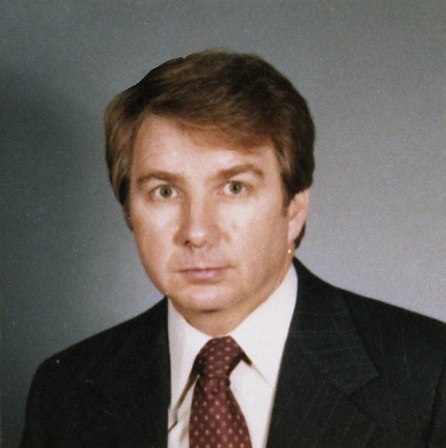
Official portrait, 1981

When James Brady was shot in the assassination attempt on President Reagan on March 30, 1981, he was unable to return to work, though he retained the title of "Press Secretary" for the duration of Reagan's presidency. In Brady's absence, Speakes took over the job of handling the daily press briefings.

On June 17, 1981, Speakes was appointed "Deputy Assistant to the President and Deputy Press Secretary."

On August 5, 1983, Speakes was appointed "Assistant to the President and Principal Deputy Press Secretary," and remained in that post until January 1987, when he resigned and Marlin Fitzwater took over the role.

On January 30, 1987, he was presented with the Presidential Citizens Medal by President Reagan.

Speakes wrote in his 1988 memoir Speaking Out that he twice invented statements himself and attributed them to President Reagan. These statements included ones after the KAL 007 shootdown in 1983 and during the Geneva Summit of 1985. Speakes thought that Gorbachev's remarks at the summit had been highly quotable while Reagan's were "disappointingly lackluster", so he asked his aides to make up some quotes, polished them himself, then issued them to the press as President Reagan's statements. Speakes' revelations, something of a side note in the book, touched off a minor controversy; reporters were annoyed at having been fooled, and Marlin Fitzwater, Speakes's successor, called it a "damn outrage" and complained that they unfairly called into question the veracity of other presidential statements. Speakes said "I was representing his thought if not his words", but also apologized to Reagan, saying he had "provided fodder for those who would aim the cannons of criticism at the President I served loyally for 6 years." Speakes left a job at Merrill Lynch which he had held for a short time as a result of the controversy.

Speakes's comments on the HIV/AIDS epidemic in the 1980s have been criticized. During press briefings over the course of several years, reporter Lester Kinsolving asked Speakes what response, if any, the administration had to the developing crisis. On most of these occasions, Speakes and the White House press corps responded with homophobic jokes, laughter, and disinterest, responses that have been pointed to as symbols of the Reagan administration's slow response to the epidemic.

== Personal life and death ==
Speakes was married to the former Laura Christine Crawford (born 1945), whom he met in high school. The two had three children and later divorced.

Speakes died in Cleveland, Mississippi, on January 10, 2014, at the age of 74, of Alzheimer's disease. His body was interred a few hours after his death at North Cleveland Cemetery.

== Books ==
- Larry Speakes: Speaking Out (New York: Avon Books, 1989) paperback ISBN 978-0380707263

Political offices
Preceded by James Brady	White House Press Secretary; Acting; 1981–1987	Succeeded by Marlin Fitzwater
