= Dan Gross =

American journalist

Dan Gross is an American public relations and crisis communications professional who wrote a gossip column for the Philadelphia Daily News. His work has appeared in magazines such as Rolling Stone and Anthem, and he published two fanzines, Scenester! and Deal With It in the 1990s. He is a graduate of Lower Merion High School and Temple University. In 2009 he became president of The Newspaper Guild of Greater Philadelphia Local 10. He played bass in the band None More Black and is currently a member of Renegade.
