= List of Desert Island Discs episodes (1971–1980) =

Desert Island Discs

The BBC Radio 4 programme Desert Island Discs invites castaways to choose eight pieces of music, a book (in addition to the Bible – or a religious text appropriate to that person's beliefs – and the Complete Works of Shakespeare) and a luxury item that they would take to an imaginary desert island, where they will be marooned indefinitely. The rules state that the chosen luxury item must not be anything animate or indeed anything that enables the castaway to escape from the island, for instance a radio set, sailing yacht or aeroplane. The choices of book and luxury can sometimes give insight into the guest's life, and the choices of guests between 1971 and 1980 are listed here.

== 1971 ==
Date	Castaway	Book	Luxury	More info
2 January 1971	Sacha Distel	English Dictionary	Guitar	more
9 January 1971	James Fitton	Encyclopedia	Painting materials	more
16 January 1971	Robert Bolt	Novels of P. G. Wodehouse	Writing materials	more
23 January 1971	Madame (Lilian) Stiles-Allen	The Science of Mind by Ernest Holmes	Piano	more
30 January 1971	Laurie Lee	The Atlantic Book of British and American Poetry by Edith Sitwell	Materials for making wine or beer	more
6 February 1971	Alan Keith	Oxford Book of English Verse	Model-making tools	more
13 February 1971	Harvey Smith	A selection to sample	Radio receiver	more
20 February 1971	Wendy Craig	Complete works of Oscar Wilde	Toothbrushes	more
27 February 1971	Ravi Shankar	Poems of Rabindranath Tagore	Perfume	more
6 March 1971	Ludovic Kennedy	Poems of George Herbert and John Donne	Tartar sauce	more
13 March 1971	Patrick Cargill	The Spotlight casting directory	His Bentley car	more
20 March 1971	Sir Louis Gluckstein	The Oxford Dictionary of Quotations	Four-poster bed	more
27 March 1971	Clodagh Rodgers	The Godfather by Mario Puzo	Prawn cocktails	more
3 April 1971	Peter Daubeny	His own book My World of Theatre	Picture of his family	more
10 April 1971	Geoff Boycott	A set of Wisden Cricketers' Almanacks	Telephone line to a sports newspaper	more
17 April 1971	Mrs Mills	Cookery encyclopedia	Family photograph	more
24 April 1971	Jonathan Miller	The Road to Xanadu by John Livingston Lowes	Razor	more
1 May 1971	Billie Whitelaw	Cookery book	Make-up box	more
8 May 1971	Reginald Foort	Back numbers of the Reader's Digest	Organ	more
15 May 1971	John Braine	Collected poems of John Betjeman	René Magritte's The Empire of Light	more
22 May 1971	Joyce Grenfell	Science and Health with Key to the Scriptures by Mary Baker Eddy	Writing materials	more
29 May 1971	Ronnie Corbett	Handbook on tropical vegetation	Golf clubs and balls	more
5 June 1971	Vernon Bartlett	Encyclopedia	Writing materials and playing cards	more
12 June 1971	Elizabeth Ryan	Oxford Book of English Verse	Piano	more
19 June 1971	Clive Dunn	Encyclopedia	Soap	more
26 June 1971	Maurice Woodruff	Palgrave's Golden Treasury	Writing materials	more
3 July 1971	Michael Crawford	A Book of Beauty by John Hadfield	Cherry tree	more
10 July 1971	Laurence Whistler	Come Hither by Walter de la Mare	Magnifying glass	more
17 July 1971	John Cleese	Vincent Price's Cookery Book	Life-sized model of Margaret Thatcher and a baseball bat	more
24 July 1971	James Laver	Oxford Book of English Verse	Buddhist altar in the British Museum	more
31 July 1971	Lorin Maazel	Collected works of Epictetus	Chess set with a problem book	more
7 August 1971	Ian McKellen	Collected works of Jane Austen	Writing materials	more
14 August 1971	Richard Gordon	Michelin Guide to France	Pin	more
21 August 1971	Sylva Stuart Watson	Volumes on astronomy and astrology	Forty yards of flowered chintz, a needle & cotton	more
28 August 1971	Arthur Rubinstein	Book from his library	Revolver	more
4 September 1971	Glenda Jackson	Persuasion by Jane Austen	Queen Mary's Dolls' House	more
11 September 1971	David Shepherd	Volume on Elementary Calculus	The Black Prince Steam Locomotive, canvases and oil paint	more
18 September 1971	Kenneth Allsop	Do-it-yourself manual	Binoculars	more
25 September 1971	Mollie Lee	In Search of Lost Time by Marcel Proust	Typewriter and paper	more
2 October 1971	Caterina Valente	Novels by James A. Michener	English pub	more
9 October 1971	Sacheverell Sitwell	War and Peace and Anna Karenina by Leo Tolstoy	Refrigerator	more
16 October 1971	Ivy Benson	London Sparrow by Phyllis Thompson	Piano	more
23 October 1971	Sibyl Mary Hathaway	History of England by Keith Feiling	Canvas and tapestry tools	more
30 October 1971	C A Joyce	Novels by Georgette Heyer	Self-portrait painted by his wife	more
6 November 1971	Vivian Dunn	Autobiography of Winston Churchill	Piano, manuscript paper, pencils and a rubber	more
13 November 1971	Nicolette Milnes-Walker	The Lord of the Rings by J. R. R. Tolkien	Hot water and bath oil	more
20 November 1971	Alfred Brendel	Lieder by Franz Schubert	Bavarian rococo church	more
27 November 1971	Steve Race	Dictionary of Musical Themes	Binoculars	more
4 December 1971	Graham Kerr	Encyclopaedia of Ancient Civilisations	Wine	more
11 December 1971	Barbara Mullen	Illustrated Herbal	Dart board and darts of different weights	more
18 December 1971	Julia Trevelyan Oman	Elizabeth R	Seeds	more
25 December 1971	David Frost	Set of Hansard	Paper and felt-tipped pens	more

== 1972 ==
Date	Castaway	Book	Luxury	More info
1 January 1972	Gwen Berryman	Cookery book	Writing materials	more
8 January 1972	Isaac Stern	Encyclopædia Britannica	Refrigerator	more
15 January 1972	Christopher Plummer	Winnie-the-Pooh by A. A. Milne	Jeroboam of Taittinger Champagne	more
22 January 1972	Richard Ingrams	Teach yourself piano tuning	Piano	more
29 January 1972	Stuart Burrows	Complete works of Oscar Wilde	Soap	more
5 February 1972	David Hockney	Route 69 by Floyd Carter	Paper, pencils and a battery-operated sharpener	more
12 February 1972	Alice Delysia	Les Misérables by Victor Hugo	Bed	more
19 February 1972	Michael Parkinson	Death in the Afternoon by Ernest Hemingway	Typewriter and paper	more
26 February 1972	Hammond Innes	The European Settlement of North America by Stanley Elliott	Guinness World Records	more
4 March 1972	Raymond Leppard	Iliad and Odyssey by Homer	Gin, Dry Martini and lemons	more
11 March 1972	David Storey	Poetry by W. B. Yeats	Wood and stone-carving tools	more
18 March 1972	Elizabeth Harwood	Survival manual	John Constable landscape	more
25 March 1972	Robertson Hare	His book Yours Indubitably	Scotch Whisky	more
1 April 1972	John Noakes	The Corn Is Green by Emlyn Williams	12th-century candlestick in Victoria and Albert Museum	more
8 April 1972	Sir Geoffrey Jackson	The Lord of the Rings by J. R. R. Tolkien	Spanish guitar	more
15 April 1972	Wendy Hiller	Diary of a Country Parson by James Woodforde	The Resurrection, Cookham by Stanley Spencer	more
22 April 1972	Léonide Massine	His book on Choreography		more
29 April 1972	Elizabeth Jane Howard	Encyclopedia	Writing materials	more
6 May 1972	David Bryant	Encyclopedia of Gardening	Golf clubs and balls	more
13 May 1972	Joan Bakewell	Collected works of James Joyce	Yellow Lamborghini	more
20 May 1972	Geoffrey Parsons	The Lord of the Rings by J. R. R. Tolkien	Crystal rock specimens	more
27 May 1972	Tony Bennett	Complete works of Leonardo da Vinci	Painting materials	more
3 June 1972	Alec Robertson	48 Preludes and Fugues by Johann Sebastian Bach	Piano	more
10 June 1972	Professor Francis Camps	Oxford English Dictionary	Tape recorder	more
17 June 1972	Judi Dench	Book of Kells	Basil Brush films and projector	more
24 June 1972	Jean Plaidy	Dictionary of National Biography	Typewriter, paper and a hostess gown	more
1 July 1972	Charles Groves	Anthology of English Verse	Cigars	more
8 July 1972	Henry Cecil Leon	A Dictionary of Modern English Usage by Henry Watson Fowler	Aspirin	more
15 July 1972	Joe Henderson	The Story of Mankind by Hendrik Willem van Loon	Radio receiver	more
22 July 1972	Marcel Marceau		Painting materials	more
29 July 1972	Sir Arthur Bliss	The Swiss Family Robinson by Johann David Wyss	Binoculars	more
5 August 1972	Edward Ardizzone	The Pickwick Papers by Charles Dickens	Malt whisky and drawing paper	more
12 August 1972	Stéphane Grappelli	Atlas	Koh-i-Noor diamond	more
19 August 1972	Professor Barry Cunliffe	Book on plant genetics	Still	more
26 August 1972	Jimmy Tarbuck	Encyclopædia Britannica	Golf clubs and balls	more
2 September 1972	David Franklin	A Dictionary of Modern English Usage by Henry Watson Fowler	Padded deckchair	more
9 September 1972	Anthony Lawrence	In Search of Lost Time by Marcel Proust	Two armchairs	more
16 September 1972	Margaret Lockwood	Encyclopædia Britannica	Piano	more
23 September 1972	John Reed	Do it yourself manual	Painting materials	more
30 September 1972	Terence Cuneo	Anthony Adverse by Hervey Allen	Painting materials	more
7 October 1972	Michael Aspel	History of the World	Piano	more
14 October 1972	Christopher Gable	The Lord of the Rings by J. R. R. Tolkien	Still	more
21 October 1972	Jack Charlton	The Adventures of Tom Sawyer and Adventures of Huckleberry Finn by Mark Twain	Spyglass	more
28 October 1972	Imogen Holst	Diaries of Francis Kilvert	Spyglass	more
4 November 1972	Dennis Wheatley	Encyclopædia Britannica	Stamp album	more
11 November 1972	Maggie Smith	Encyclopædia Britannica	Sun-barrier cream and a straw hat	more
18 November 1972	Beverly Sills	Gone with the Wind by Margaret Mitchell	Telephone	more
25 November 1972	Peter Townsend	Robinson Crusoe by Daniel Defoe	Seeds	more
2 December 1972	Adelaide Hall	History of the United States	Crochet needles and wool	more
9 December 1972	Johnny Speight	Prefaces by George Bernard Shaw	Golf clubs and balls	more
16 December 1972	Tom Harrisson	I Ching	Snorkel	more
23 December 1972	Elsie and Doris Waters	Anthology of Poetry and Novels by Charlotte Brontë	Piano and sheet music	more
30 December 1972	Noel Rawsthorne	Survival manual	Harpsichord	more

== 1973 ==
Date	Castaway	Book	Luxury	More info
6 January 1973	Tony Britton	Language courses	Scotch and Champagne	more
13 January 1973	Mike Yarwood	Volume of colour reproductions of paintings	Daily newspaper	more
20 January 1973	Denise Robins	Encyclopædia Britannica	Family photograph	more
27 January 1973	Robert Nesbitt	Encyclopædia Britannica	Moët & Chandon Champagne 1966	more
3 February 1973	Anthony Smith	Atlas	Sketching materials	more
10 February 1973	Rita Hunter	Anthology of Poetry	Oil-painting equipment	more
17 February 1973	John Le Mesurier	Diary by Samuel Pepys	Small distillery	more
24 February 1973	Leslie Thomas	His book The Virgin Soldiers	Sand iron and golf balls	more
3 March 1973	Alexander Gibson	The Complete Opera Book by Gustav Kobbé	Piano	more
10 March 1973	Dame Veronica Wedgwood	Volume of colour reproductions of paintings	Binoculars	more
17 March 1973	George Melly	In Search of Lost Time by Marcel Proust	Piano	more
24 March 1973	Cathleen Nesbitt	Collected works by Michel de Montaigne	Duvet	more
31 March 1973	Christopher Serpell	Diary by Samuel Pepys	Equipment for winemaking and brewing	more
7 April 1973	Florence De Jong	Cartoons by Carl Giles	Accordion	more
14 April 1973	Harry Loman	A Tale of Two Cities by Charles Dickens	Cards	more
21 April 1973	Chris Bonington	Marlborough: His Life and Times by Winston Churchill	Radio receiver	more
28 April 1973	Edith Coates	Novels by Jean Plaidy	Brandy	more
5 May 1973	Norman Thelwell	Swiss Family Robinson by Johann Wyss	Painting materials	more
12 May 1973	John Huston	Plato's dialogues	Havana cigars	more
19 May 1973	Joseph Cooper	Come Hither by Walter de la Mare	Dummy piano keyboard	more
2 June 1973	Edith Summerskill	Brewer's Dictionary of Phrase and Fable	Four-poster bed	more
9 June 1973	Joe Bugner	Papillon by Henri Charrière	Chess set	more
16 June 1973	Basil Dean	Anthology of Poetry	Whisky	more
23 June 1973	Georgie Fame	History of Mankind	Saxophone	more
30 June 1973	Brenda Bruce	Bhagavad Gita by Christopher Isherwood	Writing materials	more
7 July 1973	Wilfrid Van Wyck	Short Stories by W. Somerset Maugham	Radio receiver	more
14 July 1973	Michael Ansell	Blank paper and a typewriter	Knitting needles and wool	more
21 July 1973	Andrew Lloyd Webber	Oxford Rhyming Dictionary	Wine	more
28 July 1973	Ruskin Spear	Ends and Means by Aldous Huxley	Radio receiver	more
4 August 1973	Colin Welland	Oxford English Dictionary	Bed	more
11 August 1973	Gervase de Peyer	Penguin Book of Quotations	Grapevines	more
18 August 1973	June Whitfield	Do it yourself manual	Tape recorder	more
25 August 1973	Bert Foord	Short Stories by P. G. Wodehouse	Golf clubs and balls	more
1 September 1973	Earl Wild	Transcript of the Watergate hearings	Bernini columns from The Vatican	more
8 September 1973	Joyce Carey	Oxford Book of English Verse	Box of oddments from her dressing table	more
15 September 1973	Bill Sowerbutts	English Dictionary	Tobacco seeds and a brewing vat	more
22 September 1973	Leontyne Price	How to be Your Own Best Friend by Mildred Newman	Soap	more
29 September 1973	Ian Hendry	Timetable of passing Steamers	Brandy	more
6 October 1973	Mary Peters	The Power of Positive Thinking by Norman Vincent Peale	Comb and manicure set	more
13 October 1973	Edward Robey	Grove's Dictionary of Music and Musicians	German white wine	more
20 October 1973	Peter Rogers	Bound volume of Punch from the 1960s	Elégie by Jules Massenet	more
27 October 1973	Alister Hardy	The Prelude by William Wordsworth	Writing materials	more
3 November 1973	Arnold Ridley	Bradshaw's railway timetable	Winemaking kit	more
10 November 1973	Trevor Philpott	Anthology of World Poetry by Mark Van Doren	Oxford World Atlas and an Ordnance Survey map of the British Isles	more
17 November 1973	Vic Feather	Anthology of Poetry	Madonna and Child by Jacob Epstein	more
24 November 1973	Barry Humphries	Collected works of Max Beerbohm	Painting materials	more
1 December 1973	Marghanita Laski	Oxford English Dictionary	Gold bracelet called The Lion of Judah	more
8 December 1973	Gareth Edwards	Collected works of Dylan Thomas	Cornet	more
15 December 1973	Alexander Young	Grove's Dictionary of Music and Musicians	Radio-controlled aircraft	more
22 December 1973	John Mills	Book on zoology	Piano	more
29 December 1973	Marion Stein	Goethe's Faust	Score of Mozart's The Magic Flute	more

== 1974 ==
Date	Castaway	Book	Luxury	More info
5 January 1974	Jacob Bronowski	Volume on chess championship play	Antique chess set	more
12 January 1974	Terence Rattigan	The History of the Decline and Fall of the Roman Empire by Edward Gibbon	Dom Pérignon Champagne	more
19 January 1974	Bernard Haitink	Poetry by Roland Holst	Dutch Winter Landscape by Bruegel	more
26 January 1974	John Brooke-Little	Burke's Landed Gentry	Bed	more
2 February 1974	Fay Compton	Collected works of Charles Dickens	Electric blanket	more
9 February 1974	Brian Inglis	The Crock of Gold by James Stephens	Typewriter and paper	more
16 February 1974	Roy Fox	Volume of crossword puzzles	Radio receiver	more
23 February 1974	Eddie Waring	Bradshaw's railway timetable	Couch	more
2 March 1974	Maureen O'Sullivan	Volume on Animal Communication	Tranquillizers	more
9 March 1974	Eileen Fowler	The Kon-Tiki Expedition by Thor Heyerdahl	Writing materials	more
16 March 1974	Brian Johnston	Funny way to be a Hero by John Fisher	Bowling machine and cricket balls	more
23 March 1974	Edward Woodward	Three Men in a Boat by Jerome K. Jerome	Bed	more
30 March 1974	Philip Hope-Wallace	Goethe's Faust	Ivory chess set	more
6 April 1974	John and Roy Boulting	War and Peace by Leo Tolstoy and Alice's Adventures in Wonderland by Lewis Carroll	Piano and wine	more
13 April 1974	Thor Heyerdahl	Blank book	Wood-carving kit	more
20 April 1974	Patricia Routledge	Anthology of poetry	Varieties of tea and a tea-making outfit	more
27 April 1974	David Dimbleby	Oxford English Dictionary	Havana cigars	more
4 May 1974	Arthur Marshall	Novels by P. G. Wodehouse	Nougat	more
11 May 1974	Antoinette Sibley	Snoopy Dog by Charles M. Schulz	Bed	more
18 May 1974	T. C. Fairbairn	Complete works by John Milton	Tape recorder	more
25 May 1974	James Stewart	Musical arrangements by Dave Brubeck	Piano	more
1 June 1974	Leslie Mitchell	Biography of Leonardo da Vinci	Silver singing bird box containing a miniature singing bird	more
8 June 1974	Susan Hill	The Pursuit of Love by Nancy Mitford	Triple-folding screen and personal photographs	more
15 June 1974	Mark Lubbock	The House by the Churchyard by Sheridan Le Fanu	Gin	more
22 June 1974	Max Wall	Collected works by Charles Dickens	Guitar	more
29 June 1974	Osian Ellis	Collection of Welsh Poetry	Electronic pipe organ	more
6 July 1974	Richard Walker	Puck of Pook's Hill by Rudyard Kipling	Cellini Salt Cellar	more
13 July 1974	Sheridan Morley	Short stories by W. Somerset Maugham	Radio receiver	more
20 July 1974	Keith Falkner	Novels by Anthony Trollope	Colin Cowdrey's bowling machine	more
27 July 1974	Valerie Singleton	The Outline of History by H. G. Wells	Small photographic darkroom	more
3 August 1974	Roland Culver	Oxford Book of English Verse	Painting materials	more
10 August 1974	Michael Levey	The Adventures of God in His Search of the Black Girl by Brigid Brophy	Kaleidoscope	more
17 August 1974	Dodie Smith	In Search of Lost Time by Marcel Proust	Sketching materials	more
24 August 1974	Dandy Nichols	Plays and Prefaces by George Bernard Shaw	Cards	more
31 August 1974	Phyllis Barclay-Smith	The Pickwick Papers by Charles Dickens	Binoculars	more
7 September 1974	Graham Hill	Family photograph album	David Wynne's The Dancers	more
14 September 1974	Denholm Elliott	Survival manual	Still	more
21 September 1974	Frank Arthur Swinnerton	The Diary of a Country Parson 1758-1802 by James Woodforde	Gin and vermouth	more
28 September 1974	David Munrow	Men and Animals in Italian	Piano	more
5 October 1974	Cyril Ray	Mr Sponge's Sporting Tour by Robert Smith Surtees	Airmail edition of The Times	more
12 October 1974	William Hardcastle	Novels by P. G. Wodehouse	Tobacco plant	more
19 October 1974	Polly James	Victoria R.I. by Elizabeth Longford	Group photograph of friends	more
26 October 1974	Magnus Pyke	Oxford Book of English Verse	Writing materials	more
2 November 1974	Alan Ayckbourn	Act One by Moss Hart	Mellotron	more
9 November 1974	Elisabeth Frink	Collected stories by Albert Camus	Drawing and writing materials	more
16 November 1974	Robin Ray	Ma Cuisine by Auguste Escoffier	Piano	more
23 November 1974	Bruce Tulloh	Pride and Prejudice by Jane Austen	Harmonica	more
30 November 1974	Oliver Reed	Winnie-the-Pooh by A. A. Milne	Inflatable woman	more
7 December 1974	P. J. Kavanagh	Collected poems by Edward Thomas	Pair of shoes	more
14 December 1974	Betty Kenward	Debrett's	Radio receiver	more
21 December 1974	Angela Baddeley	Alice's Adventures in Wonderland by Lewis Carroll	Portrait of her husband	more
28 December 1974	Percy Press	Three Men in a Boat by Jerome K. Jerome	Binoculars	more

== 1975 ==
Date	Castaway	Book	Luxury	More info
4 January 1975	Alan Civil	Score of Gruppen by Karlheinz Stockhausen	Something to improve the taste of coconut milk	more
11 January 1975	James Prior	A History of the English-Speaking Peoples by Winston Churchill	Radio receiver	more
18 January 1975	Charles Mackerras	Bible in German	Wine	more
25 January 1975	Bernard Hailstone	In Search of the Miraculous by P. D. Ouspensky	Radio receiver	more
1 February 1975	Celia Johnson	Novels by Anthony Trollope	Rolls-Royce	more
8 February 1975	Lord Longford	The Imitation of Christ by Thomas à Kempis	Golf clubs and balls	more
15 February 1975	Emlyn Williams	Dictionary	Typewriter, pen and paper	more
22 February 1975	Valerie Masterson	Survival manual	Beauty products	more
1 March 1975	John Conteh	Work on botany	Electric guitar	more
8 March 1975	Jilly Cooper	A Dance to the Music of Time by Anthony Powell	Notebooks and pens	more
15 March 1975	Duncan Grant	Collected works by Jane Austen	Artists' materials	more
22 March 1975	Eric Thompson	Pogo comic strips by Walt Kelly	Drum set	more
29 March 1975	Stanley Dangerfield	The Story of San Michele by Axel Munthe	The Little Mermaid statue	more
5 April 1975	Lionel Blair	Crossword book	Oyster knife	more
12 April 1975	Sir John Betjeman	Palgrave's Golden Treasury	Champagne	more
19 April 1975	Patricia Hayes	Kristin Lavransdatter by Sigrid Undset	Four-poster bed	more
26 April 1975	John Hillaby	His book Journey Through Britain	His book Journey Through Europe	more
3 May 1975	Matt Monro	The Adventurers by Harold Robbins	Video & TV	more
10 May 1975	Ben Travers	Collected works by Robert Browning	Pipes and tobacco	more
17 May 1975	John Arlott	Tristram Shandy by Laurence Sterne	Champagne	more
24 May 1975	Gordon Jackson	The English Flower Garden by William Robinson	Dummy piano keyboard	more
31 May 1975	Tom Hustler	Blank book	Mouth organ	more
7 June 1975	Norman St John-Stevas	Collected Sermons by John Henry Newman	Emerald	more
14 June 1975	Sammy Cahn	Rhyming Dictionary	Typewriter	more
21 June 1975	Sir Maurice Yonge	The History of the Decline and Fall of the Roman Empire by Edward Gibbon	Microscope	more
28 June 1975	David Hemmings	The Seeing Eye and The Nature of Nature by Paul Klee	Architectural pens and paper	more
5 July 1975	Helen Bradley	Great tome on the law	Soap that kills mosquitoes	more
12 July 1975	Dave Allen	The Ballad of Reading Gaol by Oscar Wilde	Painting by Van Hook	more
19 July 1975	James Herriot	Most recent publication of veterinary medicine	Violin	more
26 July 1975	Anthony Dowell	The Wind in the Willows by Kenneth Grahame	Radio receiver	more
2 August 1975	C. P. Snow	Russian grammar	Writing materials	more
9 August 1975	Jean Simmons	Enid Bagnold's Autobiography	Tea	more
16 August 1975	Robert Robinson	The Pickwick Papers by Charles Dickens	White Burgundy wine	more
23 August 1975	Marquess of Bath	Book of Secrets by Bhagwan Shree Rajneesh	Whisky	more
30 August 1975	Jimmy Jewel	Beyond the Black Stump by Nevil Shute	Rolls-Royce	more
6 September 1975	Alec Waugh	Palgrave's Golden Treasury	Wine	more
13 September 1975	Esther Rantzen	Emma by Jane Austen	Bath salts	more
20 September 1975	Bevis Hillier	Street Map of London	Bonsai tree	more
27 September 1975	Lord Carrington	Alice's Adventures in Wonderland by Lewis Carroll	Armchair	more
4 October 1975	Paul Jennings	Ontological argument from St Anselm to Contemporary Philosophers	Steam locomotive and railway	more
11 October 1975	Doris Hare	Dictionary of Quotations	Piano	more
18 October 1975	John Julius Norwich	The History of the Decline and Fall of the Roman Empire by Edward Gibbon	Writing materials	more
25 October 1975	Stanley Holloway	Book on the musical plays of the last century	Manicure and pedicure set	more
1 November 1975	William Frankel	Wisden Cricketers' Almanack	Carpentry set	more
8 November 1975	Rumer Godden	Another World Than This by Vita Sackville-West	Four-poster bed	more
15 November 1975	Vince Hill	Do it yourself manual	Seascape by J. M. W. Turner	more
22 November 1975	Graham Stuart Thomas	Collected works by Hilaire Belloc	Papers, pencils, paints	more
29 November 1975	Ron Moody	A History of Western Philosophy by Bertrand Russell	Oil painting	more
6 December 1975	Frederick Forsyth	Les Fleurs du mal by Charles Baudelaire	Bow and arrows	more
13 December 1975	Margaret Price	Pacific Cookbook by Victor Sperandeo	Perfume	more
27 December 1975	Bing Crosby	Roget's Thesaurus	Guitar	more

== 1976 ==
Date	Castaway	Book	Luxury	More info
3 January 1976	Julia Foster	Dictionary of Quotations	Tapestry-making kit	more
10 January 1976	Sherrill Milnes	25 years of The New Yorker Cartoons	Herrings in sour cream	more
17 January 1976	Noel Streatfeild	The Forsyte Saga by John Galsworthy	Gardening kit	more
24 January 1976	Gavin Lyall	From Here to Eternity by James Jones	Cards	more
31 January 1976	Ronnie Scott	The Wind in the Willows by Kenneth Grahame	Saxophone	more
7 February 1976	Lynn Seymour	Civilisation by Kenneth Clark	Champagne and dress	more
14 February 1976	Luciano Pavarotti	Divine Comedy by Dante Alighieri	Bicycle	more
21 February 1976	Tim Rice	Complete works by Lewis Carroll	Cricket bag	more
28 February 1976	Sir Robert Mark	Complete works by Lewis Carroll	Sleeping bag and television that doesn't work	more
6 March 1976	Vincent Brome	A History of Western Philosophy by Bertrand Russell	Inflatable woman	more
13 March 1976	Noel Barber	Dictionary of Quotations	Piano	more
20 March 1976	Rosina Harrison	Oliver Twist by Charles Dickens	Summer Arangments by Nikolsky	more
27 March 1976	Paul Theroux	Anthology of English Poetry from 1400	Champagne	more
3 April 1976	Charlotte Rampling	Dune by Frank Herbert	Ballet picture by Edgar Degas	more
10 April 1976	John Pardoe	A History of Western Philosophy by Bertrand Russell	Piano	more
17 April 1976	Dr Christiaan Barnard	Best of Hermann Bessmann	Michelangelo's David	more
24 April 1976	Glynis Johns	I Ching	Michelangelo's David	more
1 May 1976	Sir William Gladstone	The History of the Decline and Fall of the Roman Empire by Edward Gibbon	Chinese temple at Virginia Water	more
8 May 1976	John Napier	The Riddle of the Sands by Robert Erskine Childers	Charles I silver tankard	more
15 May 1976	John Laurie	Dictionary	Reading glass with light	more
22 May 1976	Tony Greig	Wisden Cricketers' Almanack	Bed	more
29 May 1976	Douglas Fairbanks, Jr.	Robinson Crusoe by Daniel Defoe	Writing materials	more
5 June 1976	Eric Simms	The Natural History and Antiquities of Selborne by Gilbert White	Tape recorder	more
12 June 1976	Malcolm Williamson	Lyrical Dramas of August Strindberg	Puppet theatre	more
19 June 1976	Len Deighton	The Art of Modern French Cooking	Darkroom	more
26 June 1976	Philip Jones	Grove's Dictionary of Music and Musicians	Champagne	more
3 July 1976	Stuart Blanch	Diary of an Old Soul by George MacDonald	Flute	more
10 July 1976	Alan Pascoe	Gardeners' Yearbook	Diary and pencil	more
17 July 1976	Philip Larkin	Collected works by George Bernard Shaw	Typewriter and paper	more
24 July 1976	Mel Tormé	Film directory	Air conditioner	more
31 July 1976	George Guest	Complete works by Saunders Lewis	Clavichord	more
7 August 1976	Melvyn Bragg	Anna Karenina by Leo Tolstoy	Champagne	more
14 August 1976	James Galway	Poetry from around the world	Golden flute	more
21 August 1976	Penelope Keith	In Search of Lost Time by Marcel Proust	Lapsang souchong tea	more
28 August 1976	Tolchard Evans	Candide by Voltaire	Manuscript paper and pens	more
4 September 1976	George Cole	Form book	Havana cigars	more
11 September 1976	Michael Bond	Photograph album	Grapevines	more
18 September 1976	David Wilkie	English-Spanish Dictionary	Painting materials	more
25 September 1976	Peter Quennell	Mémoires d'Outre-Tombe by François-René de Chateaubriand	Champagne	more
2 October 1976	Frank Muir	The Harpole Report by J. L. Carr	Navel brush	more
9 October 1976	Alan Bates	Anthology of Poetry	Flute	more
16 October 1976	Anthony Powell	A Hero of Our Time by Mikhail Lermontov	Wine	more
23 October 1976	Norman Bailey	Bahá'í Revelation by Bahá'u'lláh	Calculator	more
30 October 1976	John Blashford-Snell	Complete works by Rudyard Kipling	Malt whisky	more
6 November 1976	Anthony Quayle	Complete works by Edward Lear	Magnifying glass	more
13 November 1976	Christopher Robin Milne	Bevis: The Story of a Boy by Richard Jefferies	Writing materials	more
20 November 1976	Anna Moffo	Divine Comedy by Dante Alighieri	Piano	more
27 November 1976	Eric Idle	Compendium of world philosophy	Guitar	more
4 December 1976	Igor Kipnis	Under Milk Wood by Dylan Thomas	Clavichord	more
11 December 1976	Gemma Jones	Oxford Book of English Verse	Armchair	more
18 December 1976	Denys Lasdun	Book about the night sky	Telescope	more
25 December 1976	Charlie Cairoli	Survival manual	Champagne	more

== 1977 ==
Date	Castaway	Book	Luxury	More info
1 January 1977	Kenneth McKellar	Complete book of world cookery	Bicycle	more
8 January 1977	Robert Dougall	Volume on tropical flora and fauna	Binoculars	more
15 January 1977	James Blades	Grove's Dictionary of Music and Musicians	Telescope	more
22 January 1977	Michael Holroyd	The High Hill of the Muses by Hugh Kingsmill	Waterbed	more
29 January 1977	Roy Dotrice	The Compleat Angler by Izaak Walton	Evening dress suit	more
5 February 1977	Barry Tuckwell	Gulliver's Travels by Jonathan Swift	Family photo album	more
12 February 1977	John Curry	Transcript of the Erhard Seminar Training Course by Werner Erhard	Pencils and paper	more
19 February 1977	Egon Ronay	War and Peace by Leo Tolstoy	Champagne	more
26 February 1977	Merle Park	A Dictionary of Modern English Usage by Henry Watson Fowler	Piano	more
5 March 1977	Oliver Ford	Volume on tropical flora and fauna	Orchid collection	more
12 March 1977	James Bolam	The Lord of the Rings by J. R. R. Tolkien	Selected cases of French wine	more
19 March 1977	Jacqueline du Pré	Roget's Thesaurus	Pencils and paper	more
26 March 1977	Mary Martin	Around The Year With Emmet Fox by Emmet Fox	Scissors, needles and thread	more
2 April 1977	Brigadier Peter Young	Large blank book with pencils	Ton of treasure dated about 1642	more
9 April 1977	Rod Hull	Boys' Own Annual of 1926	Pianola and a supply of piano rolls	more
16 April 1977	Yehudi Menuhin	Collected works by John Donne	Album of photographs of his wife	more
23 April 1977	Magnus Magnusson	The Wind in the Willows by Kenneth Grahame	Pipe	more
30 April 1977	David Niven	British Army survival manual	Bed	more
7 May 1977	Lord Home of The Hirsel	Comprehensive book on birds	Binoculars	more
14 May 1977	Peggy Lee	Letters of the Scattered Brotherhood by Mary Strong	Picture of all her loved ones	more
21 May 1977	P. L. Travers	Thick blank book and pen	Little marble Buddha	more
28 May 1977	Marisa Robles	Now We Are Six and When We Were Very Young by A. A. Milne	Oils and a comb	more
4 June 1977	Sir Oliver Millar	Emma by Jane Austen	Sketchbook, pencil, pen and ink	more
11 June 1977	Mirella Freni	Gone With The Wind (in Italian) by Margaret Mitchell	Painting materials	more
18 June 1977	Derek Randall	Guinness World Records	Bath with warm water	more
25 June 1977	Jack Parnell	Stories by W. W. Jacobs	Armchair	more
2 July 1977	Miss Read	The Diary of a Country Parson by James Woodforde	Exercise books and ballpoint pens	more
9 July 1977	Clare Francis	Volume on physics	Fresh-water shower	more
16 July 1977	Shirley Conran	Light on Yoga by B. K. S. Iyengar	Oil painting equipment	more
23 July 1977	Arthur C. Clarke	Palgrave's Golden Treasury	Solar-powered transistor radio	more
30 July 1977	Billy Connolly	Catch-22 by Joseph Heller	Electrical device to heat shaving foam	more
6 August 1977	Jessica Mitford	Orphan Island by Rose Macaulay	Supply of Gentleman's Relish	more
13 August 1977	A. L. Rowse	In Search of Lost Time by Marcel Proust	Georges Seurat's painting A Sunday Afternoon on the Island of La Grande Jatte	more
20 August 1977	Deborah Kerr	Oxford English Dictionary	Wool and a crochet hook	more
27 August 1977	Dannie Abse	Collected poetry by W. H. Auden	Bed	more
3 September 1977	Dame Daphne du Maurier	Collected works by Jane Austen	Whisky and ginger ale	more
10 September 1977	Robin Richmond	Giles Cartoons by Carl Giles	Royal Albert Hall Organ	more
17 September 1977	Michael Croft	Collected poetry by Rudyard Kipling	Whisky still	more
24 September 1977	Mike Brearley	Anthology of English Verse	Golf clubs and balls	more
1 October 1977	Louis Frémaux	The Songs of Bilitis by Pierre Louÿs	Manuscript paper and pens	more
8 October 1977	Molly Weir	The Four Winds of Love by Compton Mackenzie	Typewriter, spare ribbons and paper	more
15 October 1977	Barry Sheene	Study book of six languages	Effigy of Denis Healey and a supply of pins	more
22 October 1977	Claire Rayner	Guide to boat building	Bath with hot water, soap and towels	more
29 October 1977	Wayne Sleep	Atlas of the stars	Poppy seeds	more
5 November 1977	Richard Adams	In Search of Lost Time by Marcel Proust	Annunciation by Leonardo da Vinci	more
12 November 1977	Alan Gemmell	Book on elementary calculus	Paper and pencils	more
19 November 1977	Peter Ustinov	Blank paper and pencils	Bath with solar-heated water	more
26 November 1977	Winston Graham	Book of Quotations by William Gurney Benham	Exercise books and ballpoint pens	more
3 December 1977	Grace Bumbry	Letters of Giuseppe Verdi	Perfume	more
10 December 1977	Phil Drabble	Shorthand instruction book with paper and pens	Set of bird ringing tools, including rings	more
17 December 1977	Dennis Potter	Collected essays by William Hazlitt	Edward Hopper's painting, Gas	more
24 December 1977	Alec Guinness	Oxford Book of English Verse	Leather wallet containing photos of family and dog	more
31 December 1977	Dorothy Edwards	Oxford Book of English Verse	Typewriter and paper	more

== 1978 ==
Date	Castaway	Book	Luxury	More info
7 January 1978	Franco Zeffirelli	War and Peace by Leo Tolstoy	Perfume	more
14 January 1978	Omar Sharif	The Little Prince by Antoine de Saint-Exupéry	Several card decks	more
21 January 1978	Alan Coren	Oxford English Dictionary	Typewriter and paper	more
28 January 1978	Raymond Mander and Joe Mitchenson	Who's Who in the Theatre and Photo albums	Couch and coconut oil and an ultra-sensitive receiver to hear voices from the past	more
4 February 1978	Spike Milligan	Future Shock by Alvin Toffler	Barclaycard	more
11 February 1978	Amadeus Quartet	In Search of Lost Time, Divine Comedy, War and Peace and an instrument-making book	Projector, viola, radio, paper and pencils	more
18 February 1978	Margaret Thatcher	The Survival Handbook	Photo album of her children	more
25 February 1978	John H. Plumb	Correspondence of Voltaire	Dozen cases of Château Latour 1961	more
4 March 1978	Paco Peña	Collected poetry by Federico García Lorca	Painting of his family by Aurelio	more
11 March 1978	Gerald Ellison	Music Criticisms 1888-89 by George Bernard Shaw	Trombone	more
18 March 1978	George MacDonald Fraser	Oxford English Dictionary	Typewriter, spare ribbons and paper	more
25 March 1978	David Wall	Book on Claude Monet	Carbonated-drink maker and supply of flavourings	more
1 April 1978	Felicity Kendal	Plays and Prefaces by George Bernard Shaw	Perfume	more
8 April 1978	Les Dawson	Trustee from the Toolroom by Nevil Shute	Piece of Georgian furniture	more
15 April 1978	John Bagot Glubb	Other Men's Flowers by Archibald Wavell	Paper and ballpoint pens	more
22 April 1978	Robert Hardy	French dictionary	Greek sculpture of a female head	more
29 April 1978	Itzhak Perlman	The Brothers Karamazov by Fyodor Dostoyevsky	Violin, strings and case	more
6 May 1978	Charles Aznavour	French dictionary	Tape recorder	more
13 May 1978	Lennox Berkeley	New Oxford Book of English Verse 1250–1950	Painting of a restaurant on the banks of the Marne	more
20 May 1978	Manny Shinwell	The Oxford Dictionary of Quotations	Whisky	more
27 May 1978	Anna Raeburn	Daughter of Earth by Agnes Smedley	Indian tea	more
3 June 1978	Victoria de los Ángeles	Poetry by Rainer Maria Rilke	Winged Victory of Samothrace	more
10 June 1978	Derek Jacobi	Complete works of Lord Byron	Waterbed	more
17 June 1978	Clifford Curzon	Middlemarch by George Eliot	Pill to put him to sleep forever	more
24 June 1978	Catherine Gavin	Letters by Queen Victoria	On the Banks of the Marne by Camille Pissarro	more
1 July 1978	Mel Brooks	The Charterhouse of Parma by Stendhal	Cases of Château Lafite Rothschild	more
8 July 1978	Jane Grigson	Notes from an Odd Country by Geoffrey Grigson	Typewriter and paper	more
15 July 1978	Rita Streich	The Nonsense of Dying by Malford	Painting materials	more
22 July 1978	Patricia Batty Shaw	Civilisation by Kenneth Clark	Selection of herbs	more
29 July 1978	Barbara Pym	The Golden Bowl by Henry James	German white wine	more
5 August 1978	Simon Rattle	I Ching	German white wine	more
12 August 1978	Janet Suzman		Mink-lined hammock	more
19 August 1978	Fred Trueman	Harold Macmillan's memoirs	Binoculars	more
26 August 1978	Denis Healey	Poetry by W. B. Yeats	Oil painting equipment	more
2 September 1978	Gian Carlo Menotti	Philosophy book by Immanuel Kant	Tarot cards	more
9 September 1978	Tennessee Williams	Poetry by Hart Crane	Typewriter and paper	more
16 September 1978	Cathy Berberian	Survival manual	Box of spices	more
23 September 1978	Alan Jay Lerner	Huckleberry Finn by Mark Twain	Piano with wife's picture	more
30 September 1978	Alec Clifton-Taylor	Shell County Guides	Bed	more
7 October 1978	Christopher Fry	The Oxford Dictionary of Quotations	Rocking chair	more
14 October 1978	Noel Edmonds	Roget's Thesaurus	Motorway service station	more
21 October 1978	Colin Wilson	Travels in Arabia Deserta by Charles Montagu Doughty	Beaujolais wine	more
28 October 1978	Jule Styne	Black Beauty by Anna Sewell	Picture of family	more
4 November 1978	John Wain	Life of Samuel Johnson by James Boswell	Canoe	more
11 November 1978	Michael Crawford	Self Sufficiency by John Seymour	Inflatable woman	more
18 November 1978	David Bellamy	The Lord of the Rings by J. R. R. Tolkien	Linen sheets	more
25 November 1978	Joan Fontaine	Encyclopaedia	Taj Mahal	more
2 December 1978	Vladimir Ashkenazy	Blank book and pens	Well-programmed robot	more
9 December 1978	Barry John	Complete Penguin Sherlock Holmes by Arthur Conan Doyle	Balls	more
16 December 1978	Dinsdale Landen	Great Expectations by Charles Dickens	Champagne	more
23 December 1978	Robert Helpmann	Boat building for beginners	Toothbrush and toothpaste	more
30 December 1978	Norman Parkinson	The Unquiet Grave by Cyril Connolly	Life-size bronze statue of an Ama-Indian woman	more

== 1979 ==
Date	Castaway	Book	Luxury	More info
6 January 1979	Robert Powell	A Dictionary of Modern English Usage by Henry Watson Fowler	Typewriter	more
13 January 1979	Allan Prior	Treasure Island by Robert Louis Stevenson	Looking glass	more
20 January 1979	Elia Kazan	Iliad by Homer	20 tons of pine needles	more
27 January 1979	Benjamin Luxon	Collected stories by Idries Shah	Piano and music	more
3 February 1979	Robert Stephens	Collected works by Raymond Chandler	Tobacco plant	more
10 February 1979	Norris McWhirter	Dictionary of National Biography	Roll of cloth	more
17 February 1979	Arthur Bryant	Life of Samuel Johnson by James Boswell	Painting of a little princess, by Diego Velázquez	more
24 February 1979	Nana Mouskouri	The Little Prince by Antoine de Saint-Exupéry	Telephone	more
3 March 1979	Lauren Bacall	Collected Short Stories by John Cheever	Sun tan lotion	more
10 March 1979	David Attenborough	Shifts and Expedients of Camp Life by William Barry Lord	Binoculars	more
17 March 1979	Ileana Cotrubaș	History of the whole world	Sistine Chapel	more
24 March 1979	Ray Reardon	Where Eagles Dare by Alistair MacLean	Golf clubs and balls	more
31 March 1979	Burl Ives	I Ching	Tobermory whisky	more
7 April 1979	Adrian Boult	The Pilgrim's Progress by John Bunyan	Panama hats stuffed with barley sugar	more
14 April 1979	Sir Edmund Hillary	The Lord of the Rings by J. R. R. Tolkien	Kathmandu valley painting	more
21 April 1979	Patricia Highsmith	Moby-Dick by Herman Melville	Writing materials	more
28 April 1979	Edward Fox	Selection of novels by Evelyn Waugh	Limes eau de toilette by Floris of London	more
5 May 1979	James Cameron	Tristram Shandy by Laurence Sterne	Malt whisky	more
12 May 1979	Peter Blake	Ulysses by James Joyce	Cement and tools to build a folly	more
19 May 1979	Alec McCowen	The Egoist by George Meredith	Painting materials	more
26 May 1979	Jack Brymer	Collected works by Charles Dickens	Piano	more
2 June 1979	Sir Robert Mayer	His visitors' book	Seedless grapes	more
9 June 1979	Ian Carmichael	War and Peace by Leo Tolstoy	Paper and pencils	more
16 June 1979	Irene Thomas	Score of the opera Fidelio by Ludwig van Beethoven	Teddy bear stuffed with tea bags	more
23 June 1979	Ed McBain	Streets of Gold by Ed McBain	Whisky	more
30 June 1979	Tito Gobbi	Flowers of the World by Leslie Greenwood	Gold bar	more
7 July 1979	Glen Tetley	Earthly Paradise by Colette	South American hammock	more
14 July 1979	C. Northcote Parkinson	The History of the Decline and Fall of the Roman Empire by Edward Gibbon	Radio receiver	more
21 July 1979	Dick Clement & Ian La Frenais	Winnie-the-Pooh by A. A. Milne and Teach yourself the guitar	Cards and guitar	more
28 July 1979	Moura Lympany	Book about growing flowers and vegetables on a desert island	Wine from own vineyard	more
4 August 1979	Sir Ralph Richardson	Novels by Henry James	Pipes and tobacco	more
11 August 1979	Elizabeth Longford	Utopia by Thomas More	Tapestry making kit	more
18 August 1979	Boris Christoff	Poetry of Yuarroros		more
25 August 1979	Barry Norman	The World of Jeeves by P. G. Wodehouse	Typewriter, paper and a desk with cricket balls in the drawers	more
1 September 1979	Peter Barkworth	His diaries to date	Beautifully bound blank book and ballpoint pens	more
8 September 1979	June Mendoza	Chronology of the Modern World by Neville Williams	Canvases, brushes and paint	more
15 September 1979	Richard Buckle	Tess of the d'Urbervilles by Thomas Hardy	Paper and pencils	more
22 September 1979	Ted Allbeury	The Unquiet Grave by Cyril Connolly	Writing paper and pencils	more
29 September 1979	Pam Ayres	The Day of the Jackal by Frederick Forsyth	Large basket of sugared almonds	more
6 October 1979	Wilfred Thesiger	The History of the Decline and Fall of the Roman Empire by Edward Gibbon	Acid drops	more
13 October 1979	Josephine Barstow	Tess of the d'Urbervilles, Jude the Obscure and The Woodlanders by Thomas Hardy	Michelangelo's David	more
20 October 1979	Rex Harrison	A History of Western Philosophy by Bertrand Russell	Painting equipment for oils and watercolours	more
27 October 1979	Roald Dahl	The New Oxford Book of English Verse by Helen Gardner	Still, grapevine cuttings and tobacco seeds	more
3 November 1979	Siân Phillips	Scouting for Boys by Robert Baden-Powell	Solar-powered refrigerator full of champagne	more
10 November 1979	Marti Caine	Glory Road by Robert A. Heinlein	Bath with solar-heated water and bubble bath	more
17 November 1979	Michael Palin	Vanity Fair by William Makepeace Thackeray	Bed	more
24 November 1979	Peter Shaffer	The History of the Decline and Fall of the Roman Empire by Edward Gibbon	Dawn on the Seine by Claude Monet	more
1 December 1979	Charles Causley	Life of Samuel Johnson by James Boswell	Piano	more
8 December 1979	Elisabeth Söderström	The Second Sex by Simone de Beauvoir	Bed	more
15 December 1979	Norman Mailer	Labyrinths by Jorge Luis Borges	Stick of the best marijuana	more
22 December 1979	Sir Osbert Lancaster	The History of the Decline and Fall of the Roman Empire by Edward Gibbon	Live sturgeon	more
29 December 1979	Kyung-wha Chung	Siddhartha by Hermann Hesse	Mixed flower seeds	more

== 1980 ==
Date	Castaway	Book	Luxury	More info
5 January 1980	Reginald Goodall	Paradise Lost by John Milton	An English garden	more
12 January 1980	Sir Peter Parker	Collected works of William Blake	Gold rail pass	more
19 January 1980	Dizzy Gillespie	Baha'i prayer Book	Trumpet	more
26 January 1980	Sir Cecil Beaton	Scrapbook	Cashmere shawl	more
2 February 1980	Otto Preminger	Autobiography of Otto Preminger	A beautiful watch	more
9 February 1980	Claudio Abbado	Divine Comedy by Dante Alighieri	Writing materials	more
16 February 1980	Timothy West	Le Morte d'Arthur by Thomas Malory	Typewriter	more
23 February 1980	Fay Weldon	Kennedy's Latin primer	Shiny white paper and felt pens	more
1 March 1980	Susannah York	Italian Touring Atlas of the World	Pencils and paper	more
8 March 1980	Kiri Te Kanawa	War and Peace by Leo Tolstoy	Cooking knives	more
15 March 1980	Geoffrey Household	Elizabethan lyrics from songbooks and dramatists	Claret	more
22 March 1980	Frances Perry	Survival manual	Lamp with solar batteries	more
29 March 1980	Donald Pleasence	The Brothers Karamazov and Crime and Punishment by Fyodor Dostoyevsky	Writing materials	more
5 April 1980	Commissioner Catherine Bramwell-Booth	The Salvation Army songbook	Strong wooden armchair	more
12 April 1980	Leonard Rossiter	Three early books of P. G. Wodehouse	Moselle wine	more
19 April 1980	Erich Segal	Odyssey by Homer	Stopwatch	more
26 April 1980	Salvatore Accardo	Odyssey by Homer	Violin and strings	more
3 May 1980	Lindsay Anderson	Les Thibault by Roger Martin du Gard	Mixed flower seeds and watering can	more
10 May 1980	Natalie Wood	Poetry by E. E. Cummings	Piano	more
17 May 1980	Lord Denning	Palgrave's Golden Treasury	Indian tea	more
24 May 1980	Earl Hines	The World of Duke Ellington by Stanley Dance	Physical culture equipment	more
31 May 1980	Robert Tear	The Wisdom of Insecurity by Alan Watts	Postcards of paintings with poems on the back	more
7 June 1980	Freddie Jones	The Wind in the Willows by Kenneth Grahame	Leibig condenser for distilling gin	more
14 June 1980	Clive James	My Method of Singing by Enrico Caruso	Karaoke piano	more
21 June 1980	General Sir John Hackett	1001 Gems of English Poetry	Six dozen bottles of Château Latour 1962	more
28 June 1980	Barbara Woodhouse	Her autobiography Talking to Animals	Ormolu clock	more
5 July 1980	V. S. Naipaul	Teach yourself mathematics	Enlightened Buddha	more
12 July 1980	Tom Lehrer	Oxford English Dictionary	Piano	more
19 July 1980	Daley Thompson	Novels by John Wyndham	Guitar and instruction book	more
26 July 1980	David Scott Blackhall	Oxford Book of English Verse	Perkins Brailler and paper	more
2 August 1980	Gregory Peck	Abraham Lincoln by Carl Sandburg	Cases of Château Lafite Rothschild	more
9 August 1980	William Trevor	Lives of the Saints by Alban Butler	Grapevines	more
16 August 1980	Stephen Sondheim	Collected works by E. B. White	Piano	more
23 August 1980	Tristan Jones	Modern wooden yacht construction	12 foot by 8 foot Union Jack	more
30 August 1980	Renata Scotto	Divine Comedy by Dante Alighieri	Rolls-Royce Silver Shadow	more
6 September 1980	Earl of Snowdon	A History of Architecture on the Comparative Method by Sir Banister Fletcher	Painting materials	more
13 September 1980	Antal Doráti	The Golden Man by Yokoi	Italian landscape drawing from his own collection	more
20 September 1980	Michael Powell & Emeric Pressburger	Essays by Michel de Montaigne and Herzog by Saul Bellow	Brandy and a blank log book	more
27 September 1980	Andrea Newman	The Weather in the Streets by Rosamond Lehmann	Champagne	more
4 October 1980	Ronald Lockley	The Natural History and Antiquities of Selborne by Gilbert White	Telescope	more
11 October 1980	Sir John Tooley	Oxford Book of English Verse	Sugared apricots	more
18 October 1980	Brian Glover	Card Games by John Scarne	MG TD	more
25 October 1980	Catherine Gaskin	The Story of Civilization by Will Durant	Piano	more
1 November 1980	Derek Tangye	In Search of Lost Time by Marcel Proust	Telescope	more
8 November 1980	Mark Elder	War and Peace by Leo Tolstoy	Sherry	more
15 November 1980	Jacquetta Hawkes	Collected works by Johann Wolfgang von Goethe	Wine	more
22 November 1980	Tom Conti	Summerhill by A. S. Neill	Piano	more
29 November 1980	Alan Minter	Survival manual	Solar-powered radio	more
6 December 1980	José Carreras	Poems by Rabindranath Tagore	Las Hilanderas painting	more
13 December 1980	Neville Marriner	Life on Earth by David Attenborough	Violin	more
20 December 1980	Arthur Askey	Guinness World Records	Piano	more
27 December 1980	Plácido Domingo	Don Quixote by Miguel de Cervantes	Video and cassettes of his own performances	more
