= Stein and Day =

American publishing company

- Status: Defunct
- Founded: 1962
- Founder: Sol Stein, Patricia Day
- Defunct: 1989
- Country of origin: United States
- Headquarters location: New York City, New York
- Publication types: Books
- Fiction genres: Fiction, non-fiction

Stein and Day, Inc. was an American publishing company founded by Sol Stein and his wife Patricia Day in 1962. Stein was both the publisher and the editor-in-chief. The firm was based in New York City, and was in business for 27 years, until closing in 1989.

== History ==
Stein and Day's first book was Elia Kazan's America America, published in 1962, which was a bestseller and was adapted into a film by Kazan. The success of many of Stein and Day's books was attributable in part to the amount of publicity work that Stein and Day did for each book Stein worked with Kazan daily for five months on Kazan's first novel The Arrangement, which was #1 on the New York Times Best Seller list for 37 consecutive weeks.

The firm relocated from Manhattan to Briarcliff Manor, New York in 1975, and published about 100 books a year until the company declared bankruptcy in 1987, selling its backlist in 1988. Stein and Day's demise was the subject of Stein's book A Feast for Lawyers. The New York Times wrote, "He has produced an appalling, Dickensian portrait of the entire system...ought to be read not only by executives facing Chapter 11 but by all entrepreneurs and indeed by anyone who fantasizes about running his own company." Stein's book was honored by the American Bankruptcy Institute at its annual convention in Washington. Columbia University holds the Stein and Day Archives, which chronicles the firm's 27 years of existence.

== Bibliography ==
- America America, Elia Kazan (1962)
- Abbott's New Card Games, Robert Abbott (1963) (first publication of the rules for Baroque chess)
- The Koka Shastra, Being the Ratirahasya of Kokkoka, and Other Medieval Indian Writings on Love, translated by Alex Comfort (American edition) (1964)
- Strange Communists I Have Known, Bertram Wolfe (1965)
- The Arrangement, Elia Kazan (1967)
- Three Billion Years of Life, André Cailleux, translated by Joyce E Clemow (1968) ISBN 0-8128-1349-9
- THINK: A Biography of the Watsons and IBM, William Rodgers (1969) SBN 8128-1226-3
- A Short History of the Arab Peoples, John Bagot Glubb (1969)
- Cruising, Gerald Walker (1970) ISBN 0-8128-1323-5 (adapted for the film of the same name in 1980)
- The Defense Never Rests, F. Lee Bailey and Harvey Aronson (1971) ISBN 0-8128-1441-X
- When I Put Out To Sea, Nicolette Milnes-Walker (1972) ISBN 0-8128-1467-3
- Hitch-hiker's Guide to Europe, Ken Welsh (1972) ISBN 0-8128-1446-0
- Painted Ladies: Models of the Great Artists, Muriel Segal (1972) ISBN 0-8128-1472-X
- The Descent of Woman, Elaine Morgan (1972) (the first book on the aquatic ape hypothesis)
- The Sovereign State of ITT, Anthony Sampson (1973)
- Food in History, Reay Tannahill (1973) ISBN 0-8128-1437-1
- The New Apocrypha: a Guide to Strange Science and Occult Beliefs, John Sladek (1973)
- Samuel Taylor Coleridge: A Bondage of Opium, Molly Lefebure (1974) ISBN 0-8128-1711-7
- Bobby Fischer vs. The Rest of the World, Brad Darrach (1974) ISBN 0-8128-1618-8
- Hoffa: The Real Story, Oscar Fraley (1975)
- With the Armies of the Tsar: A Nurse at the Russian Front 1914–1918, Florence Farmborough (1975) ISBN 0-8128-1793-1
- The "Sergeant Verity" novels, by Donald Thomas (as Francis Selwyn) (1976–1981)
- The 12th Planet, Zecharia Sitchin (1976)
- Backstage Passes: Rock 'N' Roll Life in the Sixties, Al Kooper (1977) ISBN 0-8128-2171-8
- Champagne Decorating on A Beer Budget, Doreen Roy (1977) ISBN 978-0812822021
- The Final Conclave, Malachi Martin (1978) ISBN 0-8128-2434-2
- Chess to Enjoy, Andrew Soltis (1978) ISBN 0-8128-6059-4
- Fourteen Minutes: The Last Voyage of the Empress of Ireland, James Croall (1979) ISBN 0812825918 ISBN 978-0812825916
- Answer to History, Mohammad Reza Pahlavi (Shah of Iran) (translated from the French) (1980) ISBN 0-8128-2755-4
- A Life in Two Centuries: An Autobiography, Bertram Wolfe (1981)
- Fantasy Wargaming: The Highest Level of All, Bruce Galloway (1981) ISBN 0-8128-2862-3
- The Life and Times of Joe McCarthy: A Biography, Thomas C. Reeves (1982)
- The Aquatic Ape, Elaine Morgan (1982)
- Slings and Arrows: Theater in My Life, Robert Lewis (1984) ISBN
- IBM vs. Japan: The Struggle for the Future, Robert Sobel (1986) ISBN 0-8128-3071-7

=== Other authors ===
Stein and Day published works by Leslie Fiedler, David Frost, Jack Higgins, Dylan Thomas, Budd Schulberg, Claude Brown, Bertram Wolfe, Harry Lorayne, Wanda Landowska and Marilyn Monroe, among others. They were the U.S. publishers of J. B. Priestley, Eric Partridge, Maxim Gorky, Che Guevara, L. P. Hartley, and George Bernard Shaw.
