= Cyril Lucas =

Sir Cyril Lucas CMG FRS FRSE

Director of Fisheries Research, Scotland
- In office 1948–1970

Personal details
- Born: Cyril Edward Lucas; 30 July 1909 Kingston upon Hull, England
- Died: 14 January 2002 (aged 92) Aberdeen, Scotland
- Occupation: Marine biologist

Sir Cyril Edward Lucas (30 July 1909 – 14 January 2002) was a British marine biologist. He was Director of Fisheries Research in Scotland for 22 years. He was an expert on plankton and helped to develop the Continuous Plankton Recorder in 1931. He was also noted for his work on establishing fish stocks in the North Sea and was one of the first to suggest fish quotas to preserve stocks.

== Early life and education ==
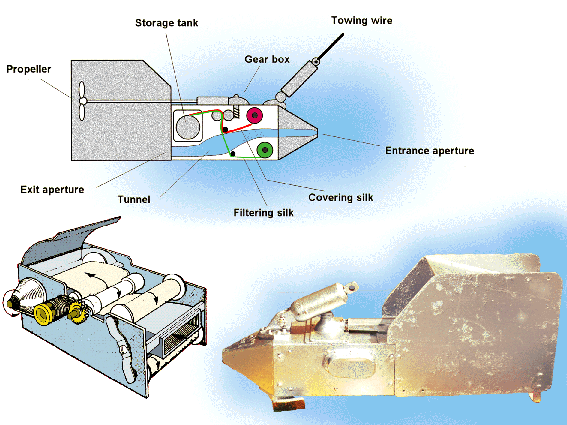
Diagram showing a cutaway view of the Continuous Plankton Recorder

He was born in Hull, the son of Archibald Lucas. He was educated at Hull Grammar School then studied Science at University College, Hull, working under Prof Alister Hardy. He did further postgraduate studies at the University of London gaining a DSc in 1942.

== Career ==
He was elected a Fellow of the Royal Society of Edinburgh in 1939. His proposers were Alexander Charles Stephen, James Ritchie, Charles Henry O'Donoghue, and Daniel Owen Morgan. He won the Society's Neill Prize for the period 1957–59 and served as the Society's Vice President 1961 to 1964.

In 1942, he was appointed Head of the Oceanography Department at University College, Hull. In 1948, he went to Scotland as Director of the Marine Research Unit at Aberdeen. In 1955 he was involved heavily in the relocation of the laboratory to Torry. In 1958 he additionally took responsibility of the Freshwater Fisheries Laboratory at Pitlochry. He retired from both posts in 1970.

He was made a Fellow of the Royal Society of London in 1966. He received honorary doctorates from Hull University in 1975 (DSc) and Aberdeen University in 1977 (LLD). He was knighted in the 1976 New Year Honours.

He died in Aberdeen on 14 January 2002.

== Family ==
In 1934, he married Sarah Agnes Rose (known as Sallie), who died in 1974. They had two sons, John and Andrew, and a daughter, Alison.

== Publications ==
- A Select Bibliography on Biology (1937)
- Fisheries: Penalties and Rewards (1966)
- International Fishery Bodies of the North Atlantic (1970)
