= Fantasy Wargaming =

1981 fantasy role-playing game

Cover art by Lawrence Heath

Fantasy Wargaming is a tabletop role-playing game published by Patrick Stephens Limited (U.K.) in 1981.

== Description ==
Fantasy Wargaming is a fantasy system set in medieval Europe. The first half of the book introduces role-playing concepts and describes medieval Europe's history, economy, religion, magic, etc. The latter half contains the game rules, covering atrology themed character creation, social class, combat (where PC behavior and morale is often controlled by the dice), large scale combat, historically inspired magic, clerics and divine power, and monsters.

== Publication history ==
Fantasy Wargaming was written by "a circle of gamers in and around Cambridge University under the leadership of Bruce Galloway," who served as editor of the project. It was published by Patrick Stephens Limited in 1981 as a 222-page hardcover with cover and interior art by Lawrence Heath. A second edition was published by Stein & Day in 1982. A third edition was published by Doubleday Book Club in 1982 as a 300-page digest-sized hardcover.

This book should not be confused with Fantasy Wargaming by Martin Hackett, a set of fantastic wargames rules published in 1990 by Patrick Stephens Limited; nor with Hackett's 2007 roleplaying adaptation of those rules from the same publisher titled Fantasy Gaming.

== Reception ==
Fantasy Wargaming was not well received by many critics, some of whom called it the worst role-playing game ever published.

Greg Stafford was one of those critics, writing in Issue 18 of Different Worlds "I think the book should have received some stiff editorial judgement before publication. If trimmed and slightly redirected it could have been presented correctly as a medieval sourcebook. Alternately, an editor could have recognized the holes in the game system by reading it himself, with a critical eye, and ordered another rewrite before putting his publishing company on the line. As it is, this is a book for afficionados, not beginners."

Writing in Issue 56 of The Space Gamer, W.G. Armintrout agreed, saying, "I've never seen a worse game. It's too bad that many people's first experience with FRP may be through buying Fantasy Wargaming through the Science Fiction Book Club."

In Issue 10 of Pegasus, Roy Cram, Jr. pointed out "The rules are the principal shortcoming, being very complicated and unclear. The book is interesting, however, for the great amount of factual material it contains about the middle ages and for many of the interesting ideas it presents. DMs and Judges will probably find it useful and interesting, but, as a game, it will appeal only to those dedicated players who must have total realism at whatever cost to playability."

In Issue 31 of Abyss, John Bashaw got straight to the point, calling this "just a bloated version of Chainmail in 300 pages and ten years too late. While there are some interesting points, it fails as a book and is a miserable [fantasy role-playing system]. It's desert dry and disjointed, and as an FRP system it is too complicated, emphasizes the wrong points, and is basically unusable." Bashaw concluded, "it qualifies as the least playable [FRP system]. No one but bibliophiles and masochists should invest in this torpid tome."

John Ransley was one of the few critics to disagree, writing in Issue 15 of Commodore User that this book was "a treasure trove of information about creating scenarios and characters, playing rules, combat, magic and spells and almost every other element of the dungeonmaster's art." Ransley noted, "if you have half a mind to start writing your own board or computer-based fantasy games, there's absolutely loads in it to help you." Ransley concluded, "I can't believe that anyone will ever produce a better book of this kind; special good value."

Street Vincent, writing in Adventurer Magazine No. 2, had a milder view, finding "the religion/magic system is really what makes FW." Vincent concluded, "FW is not a game for beginners, but is a suitable alternative for anybody seeking a realistic, coherent fantasy game."

In his 1990 book The Complete Guide to Role-Playing Games, game critic Rick Swan called this "Among the worst RPGs ever published. Fantasy Wargaming shows just how badly a game can go astray." Swan called the historical material "rambling, dry, and mostly superfluous to the game it allegedly supports." Swan did not like the complicated character generation system "pointlessly based on astrology." He also found "the magic system is nearly incomprehensible, requiring players to navigate divination tables, ethereal influences, mana accumulation, and a host of other difficult concepts." Swan concluded by giving this book a very poor rating of only 1 out of 4, saying, "Top it off with some distasteful references to Black Masses and you've got a game that I wouldn't touch with a ten-foot broomstick."

Lawrence Schick, in his 1991 book Heroic Worlds, noted that the game rules were "rather complex" and the magic system "quite complicated".

== Other reviews and commentary ==
- Alarums & Excursions (Issue 326 - Oct 2002)
