= Aquatic ape hypothesis =

Proposal that humans evolved certain features due to filling a semi-aquatic niche

The aquatic ape hypothesis (AAH), also referred to as aquatic ape theory (AAT) or the waterside hypothesis of human evolution, postulates that the ancestors of modern humans took a divergent evolutionary pathway from the other great apes by becoming adapted to a more aquatic habitat. While the hypothesis has some popularity with the lay public, it is generally ignored or classified as pseudoscience by anthropologists.

The theory developed before major discoveries of ancient hominin fossils in East Africa. The hypothesis was initially proposed by the English marine biologist Alister Hardy in 1960, who argued that a branch of apes was forced by competition over terrestrial habitats to hunt for food such as shellfish on the coast and seabed, leading to adaptations that explained distinctive characteristics of modern humans such as functional hairlessness and bipedalism. The popular science writer Elaine Morgan supported this hypothesis in her 1972 book The Descent of Woman. In it, she contrasted the theory with zoologist and ethologist Desmond Morris's theories of sexuality, which she believed to be rooted in sexism.

Anthropologists do not take the hypothesis seriously: John Langdon characterized it as an "umbrella hypothesis" (a hypothesis that tries to explain many separate traits of humans as a result of a single adaptive pressure) that was not consistent with the fossil record, and said that its claim that it was simpler and therefore more likely to be true than traditional explanations of human evolution was not true. According to anthropologist John Hawkes, the AAH is not consistent with the fossil record. Traits that the hypothesis tries to explain evolved at vastly different times, and distributions of soft tissue the hypothesis alleges are unique to humans are common among other primates.

== History ==
In 1942 the German pathologist Max Westenhöfer (1871–1957) discussed various human characteristics (hairlessness, subcutaneous fat, the regression of the olfactory organ, webbed fingers, direction of the body hair etc.) that could have derived from an aquatic past, quoting several other authors who had made similar speculations. As he did not believe human beings were apes, he believed this might have been during the Cretaceous, contrary to what is possible given the geologic and evolutionary biology evidence available at the time. He stated: "The postulation of an aquatic mode of life during an early stage of human evolution is a tenable hypothesis, for which further inquiry may produce additional supporting evidence." He later abandoned the concept.

Independently of Westenhöfer's writings, the marine biologist Alister Hardy had since 1930 also hypothesized that humans may have had ancestors more aquatic than previously imagined, although his work, unlike Westenhöfer's, was rooted in the Darwinian consensus. On the advice of his colleagues, Hardy delayed presenting the hypothesis for approximately thirty years. After he had become a respected academic and knighted for contributions to marine biology, Hardy finally voiced his thoughts in a speech to the British Sub-Aqua Club in Brighton on 5 March 1960. Several national newspapers reported sensational presentations of Hardy's ideas, which he countered by explaining them more fully in an article in New Scientist on 17 March 1960: "My thesis is that a branch of this primitive ape-stock was forced by competition from life in the trees to feed on the sea-shores and to hunt for food, shellfish, sea-urchins etc., in the shallow waters off the coast."

The idea was generally ignored by the scientific community after the article was published. Some interest was received, notably from the geographer Carl Sauer whose views on the role of the seashore in human evolution "stimulated tremendous progress in the study of coastal and aquatic adaptations" inside marine archaeology. In 1967, the hypothesis was mentioned in The Naked Ape, a popular book by the zoologist Desmond Morris, who reduced Hardy's phrase "more aquatic ape-like ancestors" to the bare "aquatic ape", commenting that "despite its most appealing indirect evidence, the aquatic theory lacks solid support".

While traditional descriptions of 'savage' existence identified three common sources of sustenance: gathering of fruit and nuts, fishing, and hunting, in the 1950s, the anthropologist Raymond Dart focused on hunting and gathering as the likely organizing concept of human society in prehistory, and hunting was the focus of the screenwriter Robert Ardrey's 1961 best-seller African Genesis. Another screenwriter, Elaine Morgan, responded to this focus in her 1972 Descent of Woman, which parodied the conventional picture of "the Tarzanlike figure of the prehominid who came down from the trees, saw a grassland teeming with game, picked up a weapon and became a Mighty Hunter," and pictured a more peaceful scene of humans by the seashore. She took her lead from a section in Morris's 1967 book which referred to the possibility of an Aquatic Ape period in evolution, his name for the speculation by the biologist Alister Hardy in 1960. When it aroused no reaction in the academic community, she dropped the feminist criticism and wrote a series of books–The Aquatic Ape (1982), The Scars of Evolution (1990), The Descent of the Child (1994), The Aquatic Ape Hypothesis (1997) and The Naked Darwinist (2008)–which explored the issues in more detail. Books published on the topic since then have avoided the contentious term aquatic and used waterside instead.

== The Hardy/Morgan hypothesis ==
Hardy's hypothesis as outlined in New Scientist was:

My thesis is that a branch of this primitive ape-stock was forced by competition from life in the trees to feed on the sea-shores and to hunt for food, shell fish, sea-urchins etc., in the shallow waters off the coast. I suppose that they were forced into the water just as we have seen happen in so many other groups of terrestrial animals. I am imagining this happening in the warmer parts of the world, in the tropical seas where Man could stand being in the water for relatively long periods, that is, several hours at a stretch.

Hardy argued a number of features of modern humans are characteristic of aquatic adaptations. He pointed to humans' lack of body hair as being analogous to the same lack seen in whales and hippopotamuses, and noted the layer of subcutaneous fat humans have that Hardy believed other apes lacked, although it has been shown that captive apes with ample access to food have levels of subcutaneous fat similar to humans. Additional features cited by Hardy include the location of the trachea in the throat rather than the nasal cavity, the human propensity for front-facing copulation, tears and eccrine sweating, though these claimed pieces of evidence have alternative evolutionary adaptationist explanations that do not invoke an aquatic context.

The diving reflex is sometimes cited as evidence. This is exhibited strongly in aquatic mammals, such as seals, otters and dolphins. It also exists as a lesser response in other animals, including human babies up to 6 months old (see infant swimming). However adult humans generally exhibit a mild response.

Hardy additionally posited that bipedalism evolved first as an aid to wading before becoming the usual means of human locomotion, and tool use evolved out of the use of rocks to crack open shellfish. These last arguments were cited by later proponents of AAH as an inspiration for their research programs.

Morgan summed up her take on the hypothesis in 2011:

Waterside hypotheses of human evolution assert that selection from wading, swimming and diving and procurement of food from aquatic habitats have significantly affected the evolution of the lineage leading to Homo sapiens as distinct from that leading to Pan.

== Reactions ==
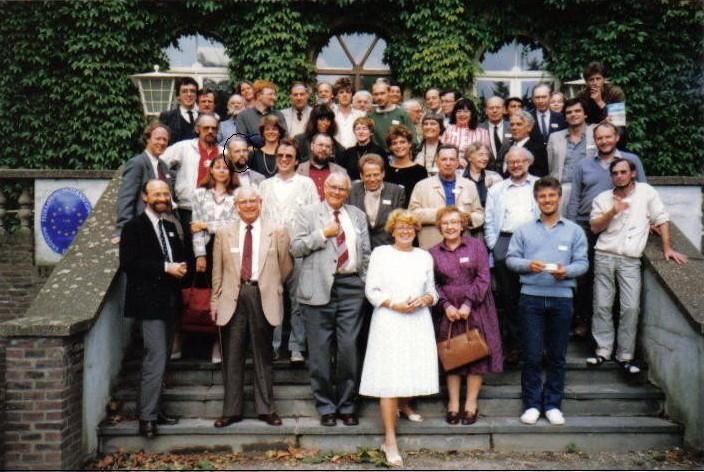
Aquatic Ape Conference delegates in Valkenburg, 1987

The AAH is generally ignored by anthropologists, although it has a following outside academia and conferences on the topic have received celebrity endorsement, for example from David Attenborough. Despite being debunked, it returns periodically, being promoted as recently as 2019.

Academics who have commented on the aquatic ape hypothesis include categorical opponents (generally members of the community of academic anthropology) who reject almost all of the claims related to the hypothesis. Other academics have argued that the rejection of Hardy and Morgan is partially unfair given that other explanations which suffer from similar problems are not so strongly opposed. A conference devoted to the subject was held at Valkenburg, Netherlands, in 1987. Its 22 participants included academic proponents and opponents of the hypothesis and several neutral observers headed by the anthropologist Vernon Reynolds of the University of Oxford. His summary at the end was:

Overall, it will be clear that I do not think it would be correct to designate our early hominid ancestors as 'aquatic'. But at the same time there does seem to be evidence that not only did they take to water from time to time but that the water (and by this I mean inland lakes and rivers) was a habitat that provided enough extra food to count as an agency for selection.

=== Critiques ===
The AAH is considered to be a classic example of pseudoscience among the scholarly community, and has been met with significant skepticism. The Nature editor and paleontologist Henry Gee has argued that the hypothesis has equivalent merit to creationism, and should be similarly dismissed.

In a 1997 critique, anthropologist John Langdon considered the AAH under the heading of an "umbrella hypothesis" and argued that the difficulty of ever disproving such a thing meant that although the idea has the appearance of being a parsimonious explanation, it actually was no more powerful an explanation than the null hypothesis that human evolution is not particularly guided by interaction with bodies of water. Langdon argued that however popular the idea was with the public, the "umbrella" nature of the idea means that it cannot serve as a proper scientific hypothesis. Langdon also objected to Morgan's blanket opposition to the "savannah hypothesis" which he took to be the "collective discipline of paleoanthropology". He observed that some anthropologists had regarded the idea as not worth the trouble of a rebuttal. In addition, the evidence cited by AAH proponents mostly concerned developments in soft tissue anatomy and physiology, whilst paleoanthropologists rarely speculated on evolutionary development of anatomy beyond the musculoskeletal system and brain size as revealed in fossils. After a brief description of the issues under 26 different headings, he produced a summary critique of these with mainly negative judgments. His main conclusion was that the AAH was unlikely ever to be disproved on the basis of comparative anatomy, and that the one body of data that could potentially disprove it was the fossil record.

In a blog post originally published in 2005 and continually updated since, anthropologist John D. Hawks said that anthropologists don't accept the AAH for several reasons. Hardy and Morgan situated the alleged aquatic period of human nature in a period of the fossil record that is now known not to contain any aquatic ancestors. The traits the AAH tries to explain actually evolved at wildly different time periods. The AAH claims that the alleged aquatic nature of humanity is responsible for human patterns of hair, fat, and sweat, but actually all of these things are similar in humans to other primates. To the extent they are exceptional in any primate relative to other primates, or in primates relative to other mammals, they are exceptional for well-understood thermodynamic reasons.

Palaeontologist Riley Black concurred with the pseudoscience label, and described the AAH as a "classic case of picking evidence that fits a preconceived conclusion and ignoring everything else". Physical anthropologist Eugenie Scott has described the aquatic ape hypothesis as an instance of "crank anthropology" akin to other pseudoscientific ideas in anthropology such as alien-human interbreeding and Bigfoot.

In The Accidental Species: Misunderstandings of Human Evolution (2013), Henry Gee remarked on how a seafood diet can aid in the development of the human brain. He nevertheless criticized the AAH because "it's always a problem identifying features [such as body fat and hairlessness] that humans have now and inferring that they must have had some adaptive value in the past." Also "it's notoriously hard to infer habits [such as swimming] from anatomical structures".

Popular support for the AAH has become an embarrassment to some anthropologists, who want to explore the effects of water on human evolution without engaging with the AAH, which they consider "emphasizes adaptations to deep water (or at least underwater) conditions". Foley and Lahr suggest that "to flirt with anything watery in paleoanthropology can be misinterpreted", but argue "there is little doubt that throughout our evolution we have made extensive use of terrestrial habitats adjacent to fresh water, since we are, like many other terrestrial mammals, a heavily water-dependent species." But they allege that "under pressure from the mainstream, AAH supporters tended to flee from the core arguments of Hardy and Morgan towards a more generalized emphasis on fishy things."

In "The Waterside Ape", a pair of 2016 BBC Radio documentaries, David Attenborough discussed what he thought was a "move towards mainstream acceptance" for the AAH in the light of new research findings. He interviewed scientists supportive of the idea, including Kathlyn Stewart and Michael Crawford who had published papers in a special issue of the Journal of Human Evolution on "The Role of Freshwater and Marine Resources in the Evolution of the Human Diet, Brain and Behavior". Responding to the documentaries in a newspaper article, paleoanthropologist Alice Roberts criticized Attenborough's promotion of AAH and dismissed the idea as a distraction "from the emerging story of human evolution that is more interesting and complex". She argued that AAH had become "a theory of everything" that is simultaneously "too extravagant and too simple".

Philosopher Daniel Dennett, in his discussion of evolutionary philosophy, commented "During the last few years, when I have found myself in the company of distinguished biologists, evolutionary theorists, paleoanthropologists and other experts, I have often asked them to tell me, please, exactly why Elaine Morgan must be wrong about the aquatic theory. I haven't yet had a reply worth mentioning, aside from those who admit, with a twinkle in their eyes, that they have also wondered the same thing." He challenged both Elaine Morgan and the scientific establishment in that "Both sides are indulging in adapt[at]ionist Just So stories". Along the same lines, historian Erika Lorraine Milam noted that independent of Morgan's work, certain standard explanations of human development in paleoanthropology have been roundly criticized for lacking evidence, while being based on sexist assumptions. Anatomy lecturer Bruce Charlton gave Morgan's book Scars of Evolution an enthusiastic review in the British Medical Journal in 1991, calling it "exceptionally well written" and "a good piece of science".

In 1995, paleoanthropologist Phillip Tobias declared that the savannah hypothesis was dead, because the open conditions did not exist when humanity's precursors stood upright and that therefore the conclusions of the Valkenburg conference were no longer valid. Tobias praised Morgan's book Scars of Evolution as a "remarkable book", though he said that he did not agree with all of it. Tobias and his student further criticised the orthodox hypothesis by arguing that the coming out of the forest of man's precursors had been an unexamined assumption of evolution since the days of Lamarck, and followed by Darwin, Wallace and Haeckel, well before Raymond Dart used it.

=== Reactions of Hardy and Morgan ===
Alister Hardy was astonished and mortified in 1960 when the national Sunday papers carried banner headlines "Oxford professor says man a sea ape", causing problems with his Oxford colleagues. As he later said to his ex-pupil Desmond Morris, "Of course I then had to write an article to refute this saying no this is just a guess, a rough hypothesis, this isn't a proven fact. And of course we're not related to dolphins."

Elaine Morgan's 1972 book Descent of Woman became an international best-seller, a Book of the Month selection in the United States and was translated into ten languages. The book was praised for its feminism but paleoanthropologists were disappointed with its promotions of the AAH. Morgan removed the feminist critique and left her AAH ideas intact, publishing the book as The Aquatic Ape 10 years later, but it did not garner any more positive reaction from scientists.

== Related academic and independent research ==
=== Wading and bipedalism ===
AAH proponent Algis Kuliukas, performed experiments to measure the comparative energy used when lacking orthograde posture with using fully upright posture. Although it is harder to walk upright with bent knees on land, this difference gradually diminishes as the depth of water increases and is still practical in thigh-high water.

In a critique of the AAH, Henry Gee questioned any link between bipedalism and diet. Gee writes that early humans have been bipedal for 5 million years, but our ancestors' "fondness for seafood" emerged a mere 200,000 years ago.

=== Diet ===
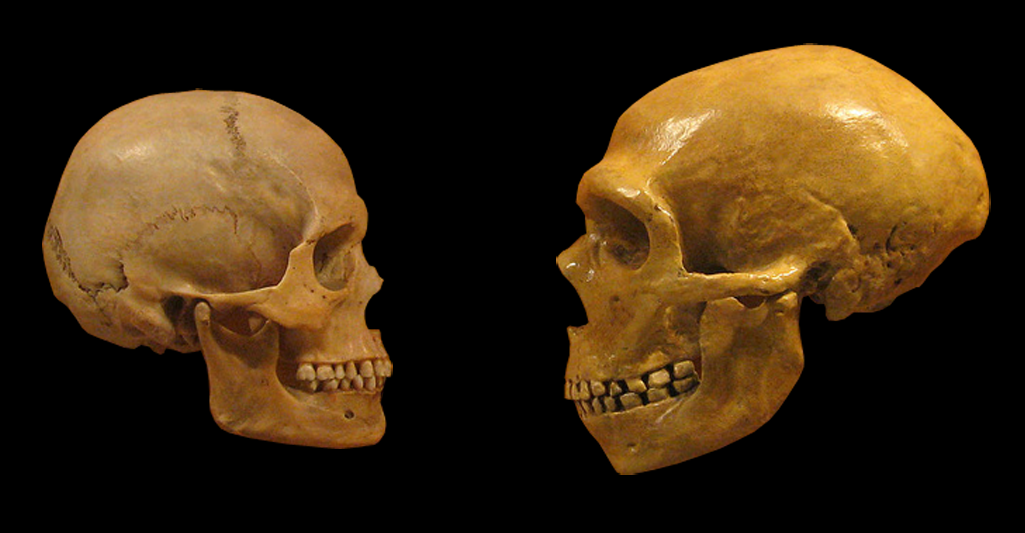
Neanderthal skull (right) compared with modern human

Evidence supports aquatic food consumption in Homo as early as the Pliocene, but its linkage to brain evolution remains controversial. Further, there is no evidence that humans ate fish in significant amounts earlier than tens to hundreds of thousands of years ago. Supporters argue that the avoidance of taphonomic bias is the problem, as most hominin fossils occur in lake-side environments, and the presence of fish remains is therefore not proof of fish consumption. They also claim that the archaeological record of human fishing and coastal settlement is fundamentally deficient due to postglacial sea level rise.

In their 1989 book The Driving Force: Food, Evolution and The Future, Michael Crawford and David Marsh claimed that omega-3 fatty acids were vital for the development of the brain:

A branch of the line of primitive ancestral apes was forced by competition to leave the trees and feed on the seashore. Searching for oysters, mussels, crabs, crayfish and so on they would have spent much of their time in the water and an upright position would have come naturally.

Crawford and Marsh opined that the brain size in aquatic mammals is similar to humans, and that other primates and carnivores lost relative brain capacity. Cunnane, Stewart, Crawford, and colleagues published works arguing a correlation between aquatic diet and human brain evolution in their "shore-based diet scenario", acknowledging the Hardy/Morgan's thesis as a foundation work of their model. As evidence, they describe health problems in landlocked communities, such as cretinism in the Alps and goitre in parts of Africa due to salt-derived iodine deficiency, and state that inland habitats cannot naturally meet human iodide requirements.

Biologists Caroline Pond and Dick Colby were highly critical, saying that the work provided "no significant new information that would be of interest to biologists" and that its style was "speculative, theoretical and in many places so imprecise as to be misleading." British palaeontologist Henry Gee, who remarked on how a seafood diet can aid in the development of the human brain, nevertheless criticized AAH because inferring aquatic behavior from body fat and hairlessness patterns is an unjustifiable leap.

=== Diving behavior and performance ===
Professor of animal physiology and experienced scuba and freediver Erika Schagatay researches human diving abilities and oxygen stress. She suggests that such abilities are consistent with selective pressure for underwater foraging during human evolution, and discussed other anatomical traits speculated as diving adaptations by Hardy/Morgan. John Langdon suggested that such traits could be enabled by a human developmental plasticity.

== See also ==
- Endurance running hypothesis
- Hunting hypothesis
- Stoned ape theory
- Surfer's ear, bone growth found in modern swimmers and surfers in frequent contact with cold water and also in some Neanderthals and Homo erectus
- Triune brain

== Bibliography ==
- Attenborough D (2016). "The Waterside Ape". BBC Radio 4.
- Broadhurst, C. Leigh; Wang, Yiqun; Crawford, Michael A.; Cunnane, Stephen C.; et al. (2002). "Brain-specific lipids from marine, lacustrine, or terrestrial food resources: potential impact on early African Homo sapiens". Comparative Biochemistry and Physiology Part B: Biochemistry and Molecular Biology. 131 (4): 653–673. doi:10.1016/S1096-4959(02)00002-7. PMID 11923081.
- Crawford M, Marsh D (1989). The Driving Force. London: Heinemann.
- Cunnane SC, Stewart K, eds. (2010). Human Brain Evolution: The Influence of Freshwater and Marine Food Resources. Wiley. ISBN 978-0-470-60987-3.
- Hardy A (17 March 1960). "Was Man More Aquatic in the Past?". New Scientist. 7 (174): 642–45.
- Langdon JH (October 1997). "Umbrella hypotheses and parsimony in human evolution: a critique of the Aquatic Ape Hypothesis". Journal of Human Evolution. 33 (4): 479–94. Bibcode:1997JHumE..33..479L. doi:10.1006/jhev.1997.0146. PMID 9361254.
- Morgan E (1972). The Descent of Woman. London: Souvenir Press. ISBN 978-0-285-63984-3.
- Morgan E (1982). The Aquatic Ape: A Theory of Human Evolution. Vol. Foreword by Sir Alister Hardy. Souvenir Press. ISBN 978-0-285-62509-9.
- Morgan E (1990). The Scars of Evolution. London: Souvenir Press. ISBN 978-0-19-509431-2.
- Morgan E (1994). The Descent of the Child. London: Souvenir Press.
- Morgan E (1997). The Aquatic Ape Hypothesis. London: Souvenir Press. ISBN 978-0-285-63981-2.
- Morgan E (2008). The Naked Darwinist. Eildon Press. ISBN 978-0-9525620-3-0.
- Roede M, Wind J, Patrick J, Reynolds V, eds. (1991). Aquatic Ape: Fact or Fiction? Proceedings from the Valkenburg Conference. Souvenir Press. ISBN 978-0-285-63033-8.
- Vaneechoutte M, Kuliukas AV, Verhaegen M, eds. (2011). Was Man More Aquatic in the Past? Fifty Years After Alister Hardy - Waterside Hypotheses of Human Evolution. Bentham Science Publishers. ISBN 978-1-60805-244-8.
