= Brad Darrach =

Brad Darrach (real name Henry Bradford Darrach Jr.; 1921–1997) was a journalist and film critic. A 1942 graduate of the University of Pennsylvania, he joined Time Inc. in 1945 after working for The Baltimore Sun and the Providence Journal. He wrote for Time Inc. magazines including Time, Life, People and Sports Illustrated. During a career which spanned the 1940s to the 1990s, he profiled such notables as Elizabeth Taylor, Marlon Brando, Frank Sinatra, Fred Astaire, Barbra Streisand, Robin Williams, Bill Cosby, Jack Nicholson and Miss Piggy. His 1956 Time cover story on Marilyn Monroe, based on a chaste 10-hour interview in her hotel bed while she was filming Bus Stop, was the first to report on the star's traumatic childhood; in 1984, he wrote: "Out it came for the first time, the whole hideous mess: the foster homes, the religious sadists who threatened her with hellfire, the child molester who raped her when she was 6. Simply to remember was agony for Marilyn. Sometimes she was racked with sobs; sometimes she choked on anger and disgust. Sometimes tears filled my eyes too." For a 1995 Life Magazine photoshoot with Michelle Pfeiffer, he held the Hope Diamond in his hand.

Darrach's work is widely anthologized. His 1975 Playboy interview with Mel Brooks (which won a Playboy Non-fiction Award) is reprinted in Gene Shalit's Laughing Matters. His reporting for Playboy on the 1972 Bobby Fischer-Boris Spassky chess match is included as one of four “Best of the Best” in David Halberstam's Best American Sportswriting of the Century. He succeeded James Agee as Time' s film reviewer; several of his reviews are reprinted in Film 67/68.

The vividness of his writing is notable; his language has appeared in several collections of quotations, including this description of Elvis Presley: "The hair was a Vaseline cathedral, the mouth a touchingly uncertain sneer of allure. One, two-wham! Like a berserk blender the lusty young pelvis whirred and the notorious git-tar slammed forward with a jolt that symbolically deflowered a generation of teenagers and knocked chips off 90 million older shoulders. Then out of the half-melted vanilla face a wild black baritone came bawling in orgasmic lurches. Whu-huh-huh-huh f'the money! Two f'the show! Three t'git riddy naa GO CAAT GO!" This description of Jackie Gleason is also memorable: "Gross in physique, gargantuan in gourmandise, oceanic in liquid capacity, prodigal of purse, a fire hose of libido and a Niagara of comic invention, the man was excess personified and one of the great entertainers of the age."

== Bibliography ==
=== Books ===
- Bobby Fischer vs. The Rest of the World (Stein & Day 1974) ISBN 0-8128-1618-8

=== Movies ===
- The Search for Solutions (1979) (Screenwriter)

=== Articles ===
- The Day Bobby Blew It in Halberstam, D., The Best American Sportswriting of the Century (Houghton Mifflin 1999) (originally in Playboy) ISBN 0-395-94514-3
- Interview with Mel Brooks in Shalit, G., Laughing Matters: a Celebration of American Humor (Doubleday 1987) (originally in Playboy) ISBN 0-385-18547-2
- The Kid from Hoboken, in Porterfield, C., 85 Years of Great Writing (2008) (profile of Frank Sinatra originally in Time)
- A Perky Porker Hits Hollywood and Leaves 'Em Squealing, in The Best of People Weekly: The First Decade (Fawcett 1984) ISBN 0-449-90113-0
- Ulysses, Marat/Sade and The Underground Film in Schickel, R. & Simon, J., Film 67/68 (Simon & Schuster 1968) (originally in Time) ASIN B000H7N1KC
- Living With Liz, Life Magazine, February, 1992 (profile of Elizabeth Taylor and then-husband Larry Fortensky)
- Send in the Clowns: For Desperately Ill Children, Laughter Can be The Best Medicine, Life Magazine, August, 1990
- A Different Kind of Superstar, Life Magazine, December 1995 (profile of Hakeem Olajuwon)
- Landon, M. as told to Darrach, B. Michael Landon Discusses His Illness, Life Magazine, May, 1991
- Darrach, B. & Hutchings, D. The First Ladies of Laughter Double Up, People Weekly, June 20, 1988 (profile of Lily Tomlin and Bette Midler)
- The Triumph of Archie Leach, People Weekly, December 15, 1986 (profile of Cary Grant)
- My Romance with Marilyn Monroe, People Weekly, July 2, 1984
- Celebration of a Father: Barbra Streisand Resurrects her Past, People Weekly, December 12, 1983
- A Hot Pig Tale!, People Weekly, September 3, 1979 (profiling Miss Piggy)
- Leonard Nimoy Beams Himself Aboard 'Equus' and Out from Under Mr. Spock's Pointy Ears, People Weekly, July 25, 1977
- The New American Antihero: Jack Is Nimble, Jack Is Best, Jack Flies Over the Cuckoo's Nest—En Route to An Oscar?, People Weekly, December 8, 1975
- The All-American Actor The Rocky Mountain High Life of Robert Redford includes Acting, Producing, Environmentalistism and Maybe Politics?, People Weekly, October 27, 1975
- Back to the Gore of Yore, Time, July 5, 1971 (profiling Doc Savage)
