= Richard Hardy (architect) =

British architect

Colonel Richard Hardy (1850 - 1 October 1904) was a British architect based in Nottingham.

== History ==
He was born in 1850, the son of John Hardy of Colwick. He married Elizabeth Hannah Clavering, daughter of Thomas Clavering of Glasgow, on 27 November 1884 at St Barnabas’ Church, Kensington. They had two children:

- Vernon Hardy (born c. 1894)
- Alister Hardy, the English marine biologist.

In 1870 he joined the Robin Hood Regiment in Nottingham as an ensign. Later he was given the command of the Newcastle Company, and after 15 years’ service was promoted to the rank of major. In 1892 he was awarded the Volunteer Officers' Decoration. In 1901, on the resignation of Colonel Joseph Wright, he took over command of the 2nd Battalion of the Robin Hood Rifles.

He was articled to Richard Charles Sutton, then spent 8 months in the office of Cubitt & Co in London and also briefly in the office of Arthur William Blomfield.

He was appointed Associate of the Royal Institute of British Architects in 1872.

For many years he was in partnership with Martin as Martin and Hardy. From 1890 he worked alone. He died on 1 October 1904 at his house, 7 Waverley Mount, Nottingham leaving an estate valued at £18,978 13s 7d. (equivalent to £1,995,200 in 2025).

== Works ==
- Charrington’s Abbey Brewery, Burton-upon-Trent 1871-72 (with Martin)
- Albion Brewery, Shobnall 1873-75 (with Martin)
- Redcourt, University of Nottingham 1882 (with Martin).
- Bent’s Brewery Company, Liverpool 1890 New brewery
- Uttoxeter Brewery 1890 New brewery and malthouse
- Kendall-Chapman Brewery, Halesworth 1896
- Hardy’s Kimberly Brewery, Kimberly 1897 Alterations
- Malt Rooms, Alpine Street, Basford 1899
- Alton and Company, Wardwick Brewery, Derby 1900 New brewery and maltings
