= Reay Tannahill =

British historian and novelist (1929–2007)

- Born: 9 December 1929; Glasgow, Scotland, United Kingdom
- Died: 2 November 2007 (aged 77); London, England, United Kingdom
- Occupations: Historian, writer, novelist
- Spouse: Michael Edwardes (1958-1983)
- Writing career
- Pen name: Reay Tannahill, Annabel Laine
- Period: 1964–2007
- Genres: Non-fiction, historical fiction, romance
- Notable awards: RoNA Award

Reay Tannahill (9 December 1929 – 2 November 2007) was a British historian, non-fiction writer, and novelist, best known perhaps for two non-fiction bestsellers: Food in History and Sex in History. She also wrote under the pseudonym Annabel Laine. Her novel Passing Glory won in 1990 the Romantic Novel of the Year Award by the Romantic Novelists' Association.

== Biography ==
=== Personal life ===
Reay Tannahill was born on 9 December 1929 in Glasgow, Scotland, where she was brought up. Her forename was the maiden name of her mother, Olive Reay. She was educated at Shawlands Academy, and obtained an MA in history and a postgraduate certificate in Social Sciences at the University of Glasgow.

In 1958, she married Michael Edwardes; the marriage ended in divorce in 1983 and he died in 1990.

Until her death on 2 November 2007 she lived in a terraced house in London near Tate Britain.

=== Career ===
Before she started to write, she worked as a probation officer, advertising copywriter, newspaper reporter, historical researcher and graphic designer. She published her first non-fiction book in 1964. With the international success that came with the book Food in History, her publisher suggested a companion volume on the second great human imperative, Sex in History. For her 2002 revised edition of Food in History, she won the Premio Letterario Internazionale Chianti Ruffino Antico Fattore.

She also wrote historical romance novels, and in 1990, her novel Passing Glory won in 1990 the Romantic Novel of the Year Award by the Romantic Novelists' Association.

She belonged to the Arts Club and the Authors' Club, and was chairman of the latter from 1997 to 2000.

== Bibliography ==
=== As Reay Tannahill ===
==== Non-fiction works ====
- Regency England: The Great Age of the Colour Print (1964)
- Paris in the Revolution: A Collection of Eye-witness Accounts (1966)
- The Fine Art of Food (1969)
- Food in History (1973) (Stein and Day publishers)
- Flesh & Blood: A History of the Cannibal Complex (1975)
- Sex in History (1980)

==== Historical fiction ====
===== Single novels =====
- A Dark and Distant Shore (1983)
- The World, the Flesh and the Devil (1985)
- Passing Glory (1989)
- In Still and Stormy Waters (1992)
- Return of the Stranger (1995)
- Fatal Majesty: A Novel of Mary, Queen of Scots (1998)
- The Seventh Son (2001)

===== Dame Constance de Clair Series =====
1. Having the Builders in (2006)
2. Having the Decorators in (2007)

=== As Annabel Laine ===
- The Reluctant Heiress (1979)
- The Melancholy Virgin (1982)
