= The Descent of Woman =

1972 book by Elaine Morgan

- Author: Elaine Morgan
- Language: English
- Subject: Human evolution
- Genre: Non-fiction
- Publication date: 1972
- Publication place: United Kingdom

The Descent of Woman is a 1972 book about human evolution by Welsh author Elaine Morgan. The book advocates for the aquatic ape hypothesis that was proposed in 1960 by marine biologist Alister Hardy. It is Morgan's first book.

== Description ==
The Descent of Woman states that female apes raised their young without help from the males and that they stayed away from any males unless they were in their estrous cycle. The book also states that front-to-front sexual intercourse evolved from apes that lived in a semi-aquatic environment and details how the adaptations to that environment changed the female genitalia, making it so that the former rear-entry position was used less often. Morgan also wrote that the female orgasm went from a "natural sexual response" to becoming "very difficult".

== Background ==
Morgan read science books, which were from a library in the Welsh town of Mountain Ash, but she did not agree with how those books presented human evolution due to the implication that things happened for the benefit of male hunters and that they stated nothing about protecting children. In 1972, Morgan began writing The Descent of Woman by focusing on the aquatic ape hypothesis which was coined in 1960 by marine biologist Alister Hardy. Hardy's theory was that ancestors of humans existed during the Pliocene epoch within a forming Africa that was experiencing drought, as hairy four-legged organisms that could not communicate, but left the time period as hairless bipedal organisms. Hardy's theory also stated that apes gained aquatic adaptations when they were stuck on an island that now circles Ethiopia, which would account for how humans are different from other primates such as how they can wade in water and become buoyant in water. It is her first book. Morgan stated, "I wanted it to be popular with ordinary people, that's why I tried to make it light. People are funny, sex is funny".

Morgan became aware of the aquatic ape theory by reading The Naked Ape by Desmond Morris. Despite Hardy's theory not being taken seriously within the scientific community, Morgan believed that the aquatic ape theory was the needed answer to human evolution and wondered why no one had told her about it. She asked Hardy if she could use his theory and after she received an approval from him, Morgan gave the manuscript to her agent. Morgan admitted in 2003 that the book "was a thoroughly unscientific romp riddled with errors and convenient conclusions".

== Reception ==
Linda Hammond, writing for the Courier-Post, stated: "Ms. Morgan's is a fascinating theory, despite some blatant speculation here and there, and despite some wishy-washy conclusions that bear little resemblance to the scientific, carefully-supported views in the main part of the book." The News & Observer wrote: "Elaine Morgan may not win you over to her theory of the evolution of women, but you'll enjoy letting her try". Stephen Jay Gould called the book "farcical".
