= Florence Farmborough =

British author, photographer, nurse, teacher and university lecturer

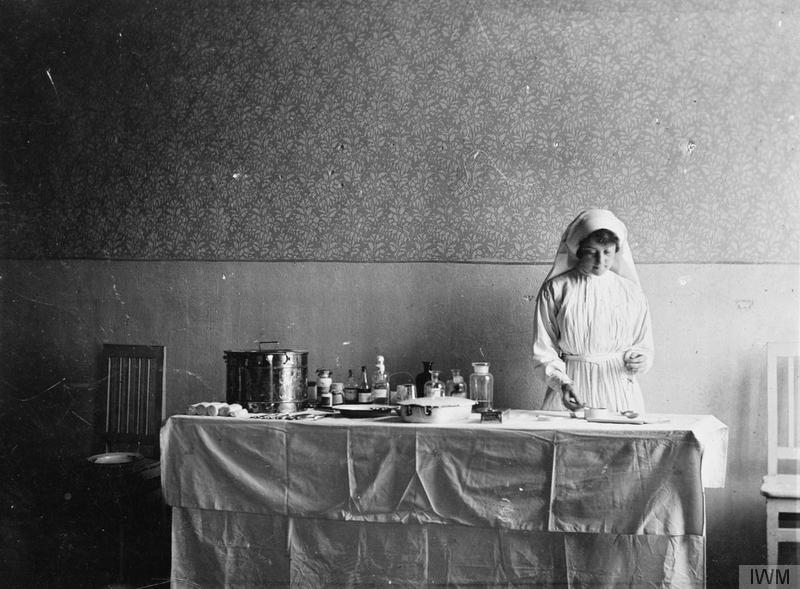
- Florence Farmborough in 1915
- Born: April 15, 1887; Aylesbury, Buckinghamshire
- Died: August 18, 1978 (aged 91); Marple, Greater Manchester
- Occupations: Author, photographer, nurse
- Years active: 1908 - 1974
- Known for: Served as nurse in Russia during WWI
- Notable work: Photographs and memoirs

Florence Farmborough FRGS was an author, photographer, nurse, teacher and university lecturer.

== Early biography ==
Florence Farmborough, who was the fourth of six children, was born and grew up in Buckinghamshire. In 1908 she went to work as a governess for a family in Kiev, then part of the Russian Empire. Two years later she moved to Moscow, where she was employed as English tutor to the two daughters of Pavel Sergeyvich Usov, a distinguished heart surgeon.

On the outbreak of the Great War in 1914, she qualified and worked as a Red Cross nurse with the Imperial Russian army, and saw service at both the Galician and the Romanian Fronts. During her time as a nurse she kept a diary and habitually took a large plate camera around with her. She would develop and print her plates while encamped with the forces. Extracts from the diaries were eventually used as the source material for her book, Nurse at the Russian Front, published in 1974.

She also worked as a reporter for The Times and for BBC Radio. Following the October Revolution and the disbandment of her Red Cross unit, she returned to England in 1918, travelling via Siberia, Vladivostok and the US, and crossing the Pacific on the same ship as Maria Bochkareva. During and after this journey she wrote a number of articles for The Times, which were based on what she had witnessed and experienced in Russia in the aftermath of the Bolshevik coup. She contributed a number of chapters on the peoples of Eastern Europe to "Peoples of All Nations" edited by J.A.Hammerton.

== Later biography ==
After returning to Britain, Miss Farmborough was elected a Fellow of the Royal Geographical Society.

In 1926 she was appointed as a university lecturer in English in Valencia, Spain. During the Spanish Civil War (1936–1939), Farmborough, who held strong anti-communist opinions, allied with the Nationalists. She worked as a newsreader on Spanish National Radio, broadcasting daily news bulletins in English. She later returned to England and worked for the Women's Voluntary Service during the Battle of Britain, becoming particularly involved in the rehabilitation of Spanish-speaking Gibraltarians.

Later she spent four years as a government censor in Jamaica, checking correspondence to and from South America. She made her home at Sompting near Worthing, Sussex. She gave Russian lessons at her home to pupils from Worthing High School for Boys. Later she moved to Newton Abbot. She made a return visit to Russia in 1962, and visited the Holy Land in 1966.

In 1974, the year in which her First World War diaries were published, she was the subject of a programme English Nurse with the Tsar's Army in the BBC Television documentary series Yesterday's Witness. She was also awarded Honorary Life Membership of the British Red Cross. By this time she was living in a retirement home in Cheshire, although the final part of her life was spent at the home of her nephew.

The idea of publishing a book based on her 1914–18 diaries and photographs, which had been carefully preserved by her sister Margaret, came as a result of an exhibition she gave of her Russian memorabilia at Heswall in April 1971. She declined the services of a ghost writer and, working daily from morning until night over a period of thirteen months, she prepared her manuscript entirely by herself, producing over 400,000 words. By her own admission, that was "much too much", and in the event her publisher cut "almost half of it".

Florence Farmborough died in 1978, aged 91. She never married.

A substantial proportion of her photographs are held by the Imperial War Museum, in the Florence Farmborough collection.

== Bibliography ==
- Life and People in National Spain Published by Sheed & Ward in 1938
- Nurse at the Russian Front: A Diary 1914-18 First published by Constable (UK) in 1974. ISBN 0-09-459970-X. (The US edition of this book has the title With the Armies of the Tsar: A Nurse at the Russian Front 1914-1918, and was published by Stein & Day, Briarcliff Manor, New York, 1975. ISBN 0-8128-1793-1)
- Russian Album 1908-1918 Published by Michael Russell (Publishing) Ltd. in 1979 ISBN 0-85955-039-7
