= The Last Days of the Dinosaurs =

2022 popular paleontology book by Riley Black

- First edition
- Author: Riley Black
- Subject: Paleontology
- Genre: Creative nonfiction
- Publisher: History Press
- Publication date: 2022
- Pages: 304
- ISBN: 1803990724

The Last Days of the Dinosaurs is a 2022 popular paleontology book by science writer Riley Black. Beginning just before the Cretaceous–Paleogene extinction event, Black's book focuses on the aftermath of the asteroid impact and the way that life came back in the million years following the death of the dinosaurs. Styled as creative nonfiction, the book received universally positive reviews.
