= Hitch-hiker's Guide to Europe =

1971 English-language travel guide book by Ken Welsh

- The front cover of the 1972 first US edition of the Hitch-hiker's Guide to Europe.
- Language: English
- Publisher: Pan Books
- Publication date: 1971

The Hitch-hiker's Guide to Europe (ISBN 0-8128-1446-0) was a travel guide, by "Australian expatriate" Ken Welsh, and first published in 1971 in the UK by Pan Books. A first American edition was published in 1972 by Stein and Day, New York, NY, US. The book has been described as "providing valuable guidance for either the first-timer or the repeater" in Europe, the Eastern Bloc nations, Turkey, North Africa, and the Middle East and a "guide and compendium of advice for seeing Europe by the skin of your teeth".

== Contents ==
=== Countries/regions ===
Factual information on specific countries/regions was broken down into (using the book's original chapter headings):

- England
- Wales
- Scotland
- Northern Ireland
- Ireland
- France
- Belgium
- the Netherlands
- West Germany
- Luxembourg and the Small Countries
- Switzerland
- Austria
- Italy
- Spain
- Portugal
- Greece
- Denmark
- Sweden
- Norway
- Finland
- The Communist Countries
  - In the 1972 edition, the entire contents of the subsection on Albania were the words "Forget it."
- Morocco and Northern Africa
- Turkey and the Middle East

=== Further sections ===
Further information was broken down into sections on:

- How to hitch (including the warning: "there's a dark side too, and it comes when you're 27 miles from nowhere in the middle of a black night with rain drenching you and you have no tent and no cover")
- When not to hitch
- How to make money go further
- How to get in and out of a strange town and what to do when you're there
- Photography hints
- International Student Identity Cards
- Embassy and Student Association addresses
- Youth Hostels
- Black markets
- Selling and pawning items

== Editions ==
The book is long out of print, though it may be found in used-book shops. Updated editions were printed in 1974, 1975, 1980, 1984, 1986 (with the full title Hitchhiker's Guide to Europe: The 1986 Guidebook for People on a Hitchhiking Budget), and an edition in 1988 had the subtitle "How to See Europe by the Skin of Your Teeth." The book was co-edited by Katie Wood from 1993 and the final edition appeared in 1996.

The book promised that any other ways of saving money would be accepted as a submission by the publishers and printed with a credit in subsequent editions.

=== US edition ===
In the US edition's introduction it states that it is possible to survive a trip in Europe on less than twenty-five US dollars per week. The US edition also included such information as US dollar to other currency exchange rates (current as of January 1972), weight and measurement conversion charts, and brief lists of phrases and numbers for French, German, Spanish and Italian.

== Criticism ==
While Hitch-hiker's Guide to Europe, like Let's Go travel guides (1960–) and the Lonely Planet guides (1973–), praised thriftiness, Liz Olsen criticised its advocacy of "stinginess and sneakiness" and noted: "It's alright to try to 'do' Europe on the cheap, but when you must resort to charity soup line-ups in London's Trafalgar Square, or earn money for food while begging, or find yourself sleeping in a wet German graveyard, warily watching for the police", then it would have made more sense to first stay at home and earn enough money to pay for "a sleep and shower in youth hostels".

While accepting Welsh's useful advice for the impecunious hitchhiker ("if you're broke, pawn your watch; you sell your blood; you sell your sleeping-bag"), Anthony Hern criticises the book's "flippiness" when he "seeks to deal with the conventional", such as the things to see ("In Paris he says of the Notre Dame: 'Worth looking through'").

== Legacy ==
The book was "the first of a wave of budget travel guides that liberated a generation" of young people by providing "priceless information" and "travel inspiration". Similar books and series included the BIT guides (1970), Paul Coopersmith's Rule of Thumb (Simon & Schuster, 1973), Tony Wheeler's Across Asia on the Cheap (Lonely Planet, 1973), and Hilary and George Bradt's Backpacking along Ancient Ways in Peru and Bolivia (Bradt Travel Guides, 1974).

The title of the book inspired the title of Douglas Adams's The Hitchhiker's Guide to the Galaxy.
