= Muriel Segal =

English author and journalist

Muriel Segal is an English author and journalist.

She was born in London, but educated in New York City, Sydney and Paris. She worked on a farm in New Zealand and while there became a foreign correspondent and also a founder of the Women's Press Club.

== Bibliography ==
- Men and Marriage, Michael Joseph, London, 1970 ISBN 978-0-7181-0367-5
- Dolly on the dais: the artist's model in perspective Gentry Books, 1972. ISBN 0-85614-006-6
- Painted ladies; models of the great artists, Stein and Day, New Youk, 1972, ISBN 0-8128-1472-X
- Virgins reluctant, dubious & avowed, London, R. Hale, 1978, ISBN 0-7091-6742-3
