= Religious Experience Research Centre =

Educational institution in Wales

The Religious Experience Research Centre was founded by the distinguished marine biologist Professor Alister Hardy FRS in 1969 as The Religious Experience Research Unit. He and his co-researchers began to gather a unique archive of accounts of religious experience and to publish research into the area. The maintenance of both the archives and the research and publications have continued. The centre organises conferences and produces both books and a series of Occasional Papers on religious experience and spirituality.

Sir Alister was awarded the Templeton Prize for Progress In Religion in 1985 and the centre has since received a grant from the Templeton Foundation for the computerisation of the archives. The centre was located at Manchester College, Oxford, from 1969 to 1989 and from 1989 to 1999 at Westminster College, Oxford. In 2000 the centre moved to the University of Wales, Lampeter (presently University of Wales, Trinity Saint David).

The directors of the centre are currently Greg Barker, Bettina Schmidt and Sally Wilkinson.
