= Riley Black =

American paleontologist and science writer

- Education: Rutgers University
- Occupations: Paleontologist and science writer
- Known for: Author of natural history books and articles
- Awards: NCSE Friend of Darwin award (2024); AAAS/Subaru SB&F Prize for Excellence in Science Books (2023)

Riley Black is an American paleontologist and science writer. She is the author of several natural history books such as When the Earth was Green and The Last Days of the Dinosaurs. She has consulted on the Jurassic World franchise and starred in multiple paleontology documentaries.

== Biography ==
Black studied Ecology and Evolutionary Biology at Rutgers University. She began her career as a science writer by launching the blog Laelaps and eventually branched out to write columns for a number of popular periodicals.

Black said that she wants everyone to learn from the experts and embrace the sciences, regardless of educational background.

She is an author. Her books include When the Earth was Green (released in 2025), The Last Days of the Dinosaurs, Skeleton Keys, and My Beloved Brontosaurus.

Black was hired as "resident paleontologist" for the 2015 film Jurassic World. She is a regular guest on the radio show/podcast Science Friday and have starred in the 2022 documentaries Alaskan Dinosaurs and Dinosaur Apocalypse. She also gives lectures and talks on a regular basis, and was the opening speaker at the 82nd annual meeting of the Society of Vertebrate Paleontology.

In 2019, she came out publicly as transgender and non-binary and started hormone replacement therapy. In the journal Nature, she remarked that “palaeontology presents queer people with terrain as challenging as any fossil-flecked desert.” She also said that the field has been healing.

== Reception ==
Publishers Weekly praised her work on Last Days of Dinosaurs as “top-drawer science writing” that carefully explains to the reader the myriad ways in which scientists reach her conclusions. Booklist said "her work vividly provides the deep knowledge necessary—knowledge of geology, evolution, ecology, paleontology, and more—to understand and appreciate the history and future of life on our planet." In 2023, she won an award for Excellence in Science Books from the American Association for the Advancement of Science.

== Bibliography ==
=== Books ===
- Written in Stone: Evolution, the Fossil Record, and Our Place in Nature. New York: Bellevue Literary Press. 2010. ISBN 9781934137291
- My Beloved Brontosaurus: On the Road with Old Bones, New science, and Our Favorite Dinosaurs. New York: Scientific American/Farrar, Straus and Giroux. 2013. ISBN 9780374534264
- The T. Rex Handbook. Kennebunkport, ME: Applesauce Press. 2016. ISBN 9781604336030
- Skeleton Keys: The Secret Life of Bone. New York: Riverhead Books. 2019. ISBN 9780399184901
- Deep Time: An Illustrated Exploration of 4.5 Billion Years of Time Through Artefacts, Places and Phenomena. 2021. London: Welbeck. ISBN 9781787397439
- Dinosaurs: Profiles from a Lost World. New York: Shelter Harbor Press. 2022. ISBN 9781627951838
- The Last Days of the Dinosaurs: An Asteroid, Extinction, and the Beginning of Our World. New York: St. Martin's Press. 2022. ISBN 9781250271044
- Prehistoric Predators. Kennebunkport, ME: Appleseed Press Book Publishers. 2022. ISBN 9781604642612
- Deep Water. London: Welbeck. 2023. ISBN 9781802792584
- When the Earth was Green: Plants, Animals, and Evolution's Greatest Romance. New York: St. Martin's Press. 2025. ISBN 9781250288998
