= Harry Loman =

British stage performer

Harry Loman was a British stage performer, comic, and afterwards a stage door keeper.

Loman was discovered by Fred Karno and joined his troupe, appearing alongside Charlie Chaplin and Stan Laurel. Loman then became the straight man in a double act, Lowe and Loman, which lasted for 25 years.

After a period of unemployment, he took up the position of stage doorman at the Criterion Theatre in London, remaining there for over 18 years.

He appeared as a castaway on the BBC Radio programme Desert Island Discs on 14 April 1973, at the age of 92, having worked in the theatre for 80 years.

Loman was awarded the Society of London Theatre Special Award (one of the Laurence Olivier Awards) in 1977.
