= Mollie Lee =

British radio presenter

- Education: University of London
- Occupation: Radio personality

Mollie Kate Emily Carpenter Lee (née Hales; 17 July 1911 – 30 June 1973) was a BBC Radio presenter, known for her appearances on Woman's Hour, and novelist, under the names Mollie Hales and Mollie Carpenter Hales.

== Life ==
Mollie Hales was from Kent. She studied journalism at University of London and Russian at the School of Slavonic Studies. During that period, she undertook an internship at the Chatham Observer. She joined the BBC's Balkan service during World War II, transferring to its new Russian Service after the war. From there she moved to Woman's Hour, in 1957. While working for Woman's Hour, she was able to visit Russia for the first time.

Lee edited a series of BBC books featuring items from Woman's Hour.

She appeared as a castaway on the BBC Radio programme Desert Island Discs on 25 September 1971.

She was married, with one daughter.

== Bibliography ==
=== Novels ===
- The Cat and the Medal (1938)
- A Debt (1949)
- Home for a Night (1951)
- So Many Zeros (1961)

=== Radio ===
- Lee, Mollie, ed. (1967). BBC Radio Woman's Hour: A Selection. BBC Books. ISBN 978-0563073246.
- Lee, Mollie, ed. (1969). BBC Radio Woman's Hour: A Second Selection. BBC Books. ISBN 978-0563090892.
- Lee, Mollie, ed. (1971). BBC Radio Woman's Hour: A Third Selection. BBC Books. ISBN 978-0563120001.
