= Victor Sperandeo =

American financial trader

- Born: March 16, 1945 (age 81); Queens, New York, United States
- Occupations: Trader, index developer, financial commentator
- Website: www.victorsperandeo.com

Victor Sperandeo, known as "Trader Vic", is an American financial trader, index developer, and financial commentator based in Grapevine, Texas, United States. He serves as the president and CEO of Alpha Financial Technologies, LLC (AFT), is a founding partner of EAM Partners L.P., and serves as the president and CEO of its general partner, EAM Corporation.

Sperandeo traded in commodities, particularly in the energy and metals sectors. He is renowned for having 'predicted' the stock market crash of 1987 during an extensive interview in the September 21 issue of Barron's; on October 16, one trading session prior to Black Monday, Sperandeo shorted the Dow and made 300% during a day the DJIA fell by over 20%.

== Bibliography ==
- Trader Vic – Methods of a Wall Street Master, John Wiley & Sons, 1993, ISBN 0-471-30497-2.
- Trader Vic II : Principles of Professional Speculation, John Wiley & Sons, 1994, ISBN 0-471-53577-X.
- Trader Vic on Commodities: What’s Unknown, Misunderstood, and Too Good To Be True, John Wiley & Sons, 2008, ISBN 0-470-10212-8.
- Sperandeo has also authored articles and editorials for dozens of publications, including Barron’s, The Wall Street Journal, Institutional Investor and many other professional magazines.
