= Rosina Harrison =

British maid

Rosina Harrison (1899-1989 aged 90) was a lady's maid, chiefly to Lady Astor, and became known after describing their working relationship in her autobiography.

Harrison, from Yorkshire, became Astor's maid in 1928.

Her autobiography, Rose: My Life in Service, was published in 1975. It was republished in 2011 under the title The Lady's Maid: My Life in Service.

She appeared as a castaway on the BBC Radio programme Desert Island Discs on 20 March 1976.

== Biography ==
- —— (1975). Rose: My Life in Service. Littlehampton. ISBN 978-0304294701. her occupation was being the lady's maid. she called her parents mum and dad. her major accomplishment was working for Lady Astor. she died at age 90.
