= Elaine Morgan =

Welsh writer and evolutionist (1920–2013)

Elaine Morgan OBE FRSL
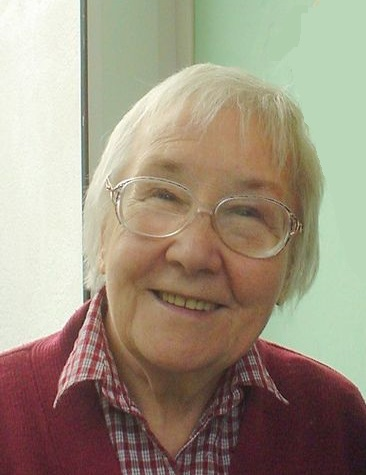
- Elaine Morgan in 1998
- Born: 7 November 1920; Hopkinstown, near Pontypridd, in Wales
- Died: 12 July 2013 (aged 92); Mountain Ash, near Aberdare, Wales
- Education: Lady Margaret Hall, Oxford
- Spouse: Morien Morgan (died 1997)
- Children: 3 sons, including Dylan Morgan

Elaine Morgan OBE, FRSL (7 November 1920 – 12 July 2013), was a Welsh writer for television and the author of several books on evolutionary anthropology. She advocated the aquatic ape hypothesis, which advocated as a corrective to what she saw as theories that purveyed gendered stereotypes and failed to account for women's role in human evolution adequately. The Descent of Woman, published in 1972, became an international bestseller, translated into ten languages. In 2016, she was named one of "the 50 greatest Welsh men and women of all time" in a press survey.

== Personal life ==
Elaine Floyd was born and brought up in Hopkinstown, near Pontypridd, in Wales. Her father was a coal miner. She lived for many years until her death, in Mountain Ash, near Aberdare. She graduated from Lady Margaret Hall, Oxford, with a degree in English. She married Morien Morgan, a veteran of the Spanish Civil War who died in 1997, and they had three sons, the oldest being Dylan Morgan.

== Writing ==
Elaine Morgan began writing in the 1950s after winning a competition in the New Statesman, successfully publishing, then joining the BBC when it began to produce her plays for television. Her works included popular dramas, newspaper columns, and a series of publications on evolutionary anthropology. Her first book, The Descent of Woman, published in 1972, became an international bestseller translated into ten languages. The book drew attention to what she saw as sexism inherent in the prevalent savannah-based "killer ape" theories of human evolution as presented in popular anthropological works by Robert Ardrey, Lionel Tiger and others. She argued that such "Tarzanist" anthropological narratives purveyed gendered stereotypes of women that failed to adequately account for women's role in human evolution. The Aquatic Ape (1982), The Scars of Evolution (1990), The Descent of the Child (1994), The Aquatic Ape Hypothesis (1997) and The Naked Darwinist (2008) all explored her alternative account of human evolution in more detail.

She also published Falling Apart: the Rise and Decline of Urban Civilization in 1976, and in 2005 Pinker's List, a critique of Steven Pinker's The Blank Slate.

Morgan wrote for many television series, including the adaptations of How Green Was My Valley (1975), Off to Philadelphia in the Morning (1978) and Testament of Youth (1979). Her other work included episodes of Dr. Finlay's Casebook (1963–1970), the biographical drama The Life and Times of David Lloyd George (1981) and contributions to the Campion (1989) series.

She won two BAFTAs and two Writers' Guild awards. She also wrote the script for the Horizon documentary about the disabled fund-raiser Joey Deacon, winning the Prix Italia in 1975. She was honoured with the Writer of the Year Award from the Royal Television Society for her serialisation of Vera Brittain's Testament of Youth (1979).

In 2003 Morgan started a weekly column for the Welsh daily The Western Mail, which won her the 2011 Columnist of the Year award in the Society of Editors' Regional Press Awards.

She was awarded an honorary D.Litt. by Glamorgan University in December 2006, an honorary fellowship of the University of Cardiff in 2007, and the Letten F. Saugstad Prize for her "contribution to scientific knowledge".

Morgan was appointed Officer of the Order of the British Empire (OBE) in the 2009 Birthday Honours for services to literature and education. She became a Fellow of the Royal Society of Literature the same year, and an honorary freeman of Rhondda Cynon Taf in April 2013.

== Aquatic ape hypothesis ==
The aquatic ape hypothesis (AAH), also referred to as aquatic ape theory (AAT) or the waterside hypothesis of human evolution, postulates that the ancestors of modern humans took a divergent evolutionary pathway from the other great apes by becoming adapted to a more aquatic habitat. While the hypothesis has some popularity with the lay public, it is generally ignored or classified as pseudoscience by anthropologists.

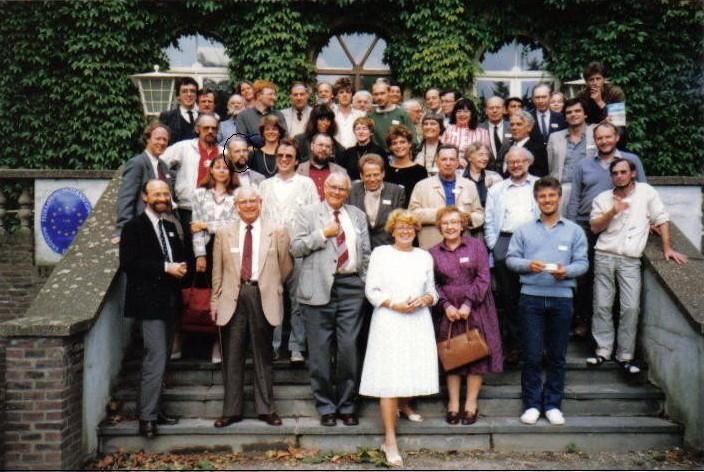
The Delegates of the Aquatic Ape Symposium 1987. Morgan is to the right of Machteld (Maggie) Roede, a conference organiser who is at the front.

Morgan has promoted a version of the aquatic ape hypothesis, which proposes that human evolution had an "aquatic phase" in the Miocene or Pliocene epoch.

== Death and legacy ==
Morgan died at the age of 92 on 12 July 2013. Welsh author Trevor Fishlock described her in an obituary as a writer "who brought out the flavour of Wales."

In 2019, Morgan was one of five women on a shortlist for a Cardiff statue.

In 2020, to commemorate the centenary of her birth, two complementary biographies of her life were published. The Welsh historian Daryl Leeworthy wrote one focusing on her earlier career as a writer and Algis Kuliukas wrote one emphasising more her "aquatic ape" work.

On 18 March 2022 a statue of her by Emma Rodgers was installed outside the Tŷ Calon Lân Medical Centre in Mountain Ash, Rhondda Cynon Taf, as part of the Monumental Welsh Women project.

The author, Bruce Lindsay, states in his biography of Scottish poet Ivor Cutler that Cutler dedicated one of his poetry books, "Is that your flap, Jack?" to Morgan saying: "With deep gratitude to Elaine Morgan, author of 'The Descent of Woman', for changing my understanding of man".

== Works ==
Morgan's earlier works as a playwright include:

- The Waiting Room: A Play for Women in One Act (Samuel French Ltd, 1958)
- Rest You Merry: A Christmas Play in Two Acts (Samuel French Ltd, 1959)
- Eli'r Teulu: Comedi Dair Act (Gwasg Aberystwyth, 1960)
- The Soldier and the Woman: A Play in One Act (Samuel French Ltd, 1961)
- Licence to Murder: A Play in Two Acts (Samuel French Ltd, 1963)
- A Chance to Shine: A Play in One Act (Samuel French Ltd, 1964)
- Love from Liz (Samuel French Ltd, 1967)

Morgan's books on human evolution include:

- The Descent of Woman, 1972, Souvenir Press, ISBN 0-285-62063-0
- The Aquatic Ape, 1982, Souvenir Press, ISBN 0-285-62509-8
- The Scars of Evolution, 1990, Souvenir Press, ISBN 0-285-62996-4
- The Descent of the Child: Human Evolution from a New Perspective, 1995, Oxford University Press, ISBN 0-19-509895-1
- The Aquatic Ape Hypothesis, 1997, Souvenir Press, ISBN 0-285-63377-5
- The Naked Darwinist, 2008, Eildon Press, ISBN 0-9525620-3-0

Other works:

- An essay "The Escape Route", also on Hardy Theory
- Falling Apart: The Rise and Decline of Urban Civilisation, 1976, Souvenir Press Ltd ISBN 0-285-62234-X
- Pinker's List, 2005, Eildon Press, ISBN 0-9525620-2-2
- Autobiography Knock 'Em Cold, Kid, 2012, Troubador Press, ISBN 9781780882130

== Biographies ==
- Leeworthy, Daryl (2020). Elaine Morgan: A Life Behind the Screen. Bridgend: Seren. ISBN 9781781726044.
- Entry on Elaine Neville Morgan in The Dictionary of Welsh Biography (National Museum of Wales)
