= Nicolette Milnes-Walker =

Nicolette Daisy Milnes-Walker, MBE (1943-) was the first woman to sail non-stop single-handed across the Atlantic. She set sail on 12 June 1971 from Milford Haven, UK and arrived in Newport USA forty five days later on 26 July. She made her crossing in a 30 ft yacht, Aziz, a 'Pioneer' Class 9 meter designed by Van Der Stadt and constructed by Southern Ocean Shipyard Ltd, Poole, Dorset. The yacht was specially fitted with a Hasler Gibbs servo-pendulum self steering system for the voyage.

Miss Milnes-Walker returned from the US to the UK on board the Cunard passenger liner Queen Elizabeth 2, arriving in Southampton on 11 August 1971. Upon her arrival, Sir Robin Knox-Johnston presented her with a painting of Aziz on behalf of the builders.

Prior to the voyage, Milnes-Walker was an industrial psychologist assessing others' reactions to stressful situations. She borrowed the money to pay for the cost of the voyage. Later in life she married Bruce Coward, with whom she had twin daughters and established a bookshop, the Harbour Bookshop Dartmouth.

== Bibliography ==
- Milnes-Walker, Nicolette (1972). When I Put Out To Sea. Stein and Day. ISBN 0-8128-1467-3.
- Milnes-Walker, Nicolette (1973). When I Put Out To Sea. Macmillan. ISBN 978-0-330-23795-6.
- Milnes Walker, Nicolette (1981). Introduction to dinghy sailing. Newton Abbot, Devon; North Pomfret, Vt.: David & Charles. ISBN 978-0-7153-8022-2.
- Milnes-Walker, Nicolette (2026). Als ich auf das Meer hinausfuhr. kontrabande Verlag. ISBN 978-3-911831-52-9.
