= Alister Hardy =

British marine biologist (1896–1985)

Sir Alister Hardy FRS FRSE FLS
- Born: Alister Clavering Hardy; 10 February 1896; Nottingham, England, UK
- Died: 22 May 1985 (aged 89); Oxford, England, UK
- Education: Oundle School
- Alma mater: Exeter College, Oxford
- Known for: RRS Discovery work Continuous Plankton Recorder; Aquatic ape hypothesis
- Spouse: Sylvia Garstang (m. 1927)
- Children: 2
- Parent(s): Richard Hardy and Elizabeth Hannah Clavering
- Relatives: Walter Garstang (father-in-law)
- Awards: Templeton Prize
- Scientific career
- Fields: Marine biology
- Workplaces: University of Hull; University of Aberdeen; University of Oxford

Sir Alister Clavering Hardy FRS FRSE FLS (10 February 1896 – 22 May 1985) was a British marine biologist, an expert on marine ecosystems spanning organisms from zooplankton to whales. He had the artistic skill to illustrate his books with his own drawings, maps, diagrams, and paintings.

Hardy served as zoologist on the RRS Discovery's voyage to explore the Antarctic between 1925 and 1927. On the voyage he invented the Continuous Plankton Recorder; it enabled any ship to collect plankton samples during an ordinary voyage.

After retiring from his academic work, Hardy founded the Religious Experience Research Centre in 1969; he won the Templeton Prize for this in 1985.

== Camoufleur and artist ==
Hardy's artistry in the service of science: Rare and Unusual Fish in British Waters.: 1. Opah, Lampris guttatus; 2. Sea Horse, Hippocampus europaeus; 3. Red Bandfish, Cepola rubescens; 4. Rabbit-fish, Chimaera monstrosa

Hardy was born in Nottingham, the son of Richard Hardy, an architect, and his wife, Elizabeth Hannah Clavering. He was educated not far away at Oundle School. From an early age, Hardy developed a keen interest in natural history, particularly entomology, and throughout his childhood collected beetles and butterflies. In 1903, at the age of seven, he also developed a lifelong interest in aviation after learning of the Wright brothers' first flight.

In October 1914, he matriculated at Exeter College, Oxford to read forestry, with the intention of becoming a forest entomologist. After serving in the University Officers' Training Corps, he left the university at the end of his first term to volunteer for the British Army during World War I. He initially served in the Northern Cyclist Battalion, and was subsequently made a camoufleur, a camouflage officer. Hardy wrote that he had been

equally drawn to science and art, and if the truth be known, I must confess that it is the latter that has the greater appeal. I am lucky in not having been torn between the two; I have managed to combine them.

He was selected for camouflage work by the artist Solomon J. Solomon, who apparently mistook him for a different Hardy who was a professional artist. Hardy however did have sufficient artistic skill to serve his military and scientific work. He illustrated his New Naturalist books with his own line drawings, maps, diagrams, photographs, and paintings. For example, plate 2 of Fish and Fisheries illustrates the depicted "Rare and Unusual Fish in British Waters" both accurately and vividly. Hardy described the camoufleurs as including artists and "scientists with artistic inclinations", himself perhaps among them.

In later life, Hardy travelled in India, Sri Lanka, Burma, Cambodia, China and Japan, recording his visits to temples in all those countries in watercolour paintings. Many of these are in the University of Wales Trinity Saint David collection.

== Zoology ==
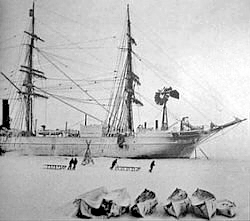
RRS Discovery in the Antarctic

In 1919, after being discharged from the army with the rank of captain, Hardy returned to Oxford, this time to read zoology in order to learn as much as possible about animals and their evolution. He was awarded a scholarship to spend a year at the Naples Marine Biological Station, where he developed his interest in plankton. After graduating with distinction in 1921, he worked as an assistant naturalist at the Fisheries Laboratory, Lowestoft, researching the feeding of North Sea herrings on plankton.

Hardy was the zoologist on the RRS Discovery voyage to explore the Antarctic between 1925 and 1927, as part of the Discovery Investigations. Through his studies of zooplankton and its relationship with predators, he became expert in marine mammals such as whales. Whilst on board the Discovery he designed and later built a mechanism called the Continuous Plankton Recorder or CPR. The CPR collects plankton samples and stores them on a moving band of silk, preserving them in formalin. His pioneering research into plankton distribution and abundance is continued by the Continuous Plankton Recorder Survey (CPR Survey).

Hardy was the first Professor of Zoology at the University of Hull from 1928 – 1942. In 1942, he was then appointed Professor of Natural History at the University of Aberdeen, where he remained until 1946, when he became Linacre Professor of Zoology in the University of Oxford and Fellow of Merton College, a position he held until 1963. In 1940, Hardy was made a Fellow of the Royal Society. He was knighted in 1957.

=== Evolution ===
Hardy identified as a Darwinian, he denied the Lamarckian inheritance of acquired characteristics. He was a proponent of organic selection (also known as the Baldwin effect). He held the view that behavioral changes can be important for evolution.

=== Aquatic ape hypothesis ===
In 1930, while reading Wood Jones' Man's Place among the Mammals, which included the question of why humans, unlike all other land mammals, had fat attached to their skin, Hardy realized that this trait sounded like the blubber of marine mammals, and began to suspect that humans had ancestors that were more aquatic than previously imagined. Fearing a backlash against such a radical idea, he kept this hypothesis secret until 5 March 1960, when he gave a talk on the subject to the British Sub-Aqua Club and then wrote about it in an article published in New Scientist on 17 March. The idea subsequently became known as the aquatic ape hypothesis in academic circles, and has been promoted in particular by Elaine Morgan, who acknowledged her debt to Hardy in her book The Scars of Evolution, and elsewhere.

== Study of religion ==
Hardy was baptised in the Church of England, but in later life converted to Unitarianism. Dating from his boyhood at Oundle School, he had a lifelong interest in spiritual phenomena, but aware that his interests were likely to be considered unorthodox in the scientific community, apart from occasional lectures he kept his opinions to himself until his retirement from his Oxford Chair. During the academic sessions of 1963–4 and 1964–5, he gave the Gifford Lectures at Aberdeen University on 'Evolution and the spirit of Man', later published as The Living Stream and The Divine Flame. These lectures signalled his wholehearted return to his religious interests. In 1969 he founded the Religious Experience Research Unit in Manchester College, Oxford. The Unit began its work by compiling a database of religious experiences and continues to investigate the nature and function of spiritual and religious experience at the University of Wales, Lampeter. In 1973 he met with A. C. Bhaktivedanta Swami Prabhupada and other devotees of the Hare Krishna movement and discussed Vedic literature, the divine flame and Rabindranath Tagore.

Hardy's biological approach to the roots of religion is non-reductionist, seeing religious awareness as having evolved in response to a genuine dimension of reality. For his work in founding the Religious Experience Research Centre, Hardy received the Templeton Prize. The award was announced on 10 February 1985, his 89th birthday. On 13 May, the day he was due to receive the award at a ceremony at Buckingham Palace, Hardy suffered a stroke. His daughter, Belinda Farley, accepted the award on his behalf. The following day, at a public ceremony at the Guildhall, London, Hardy's prepared acceptance speech was read on his behalf. Nine days after the stroke, Hardy died in Oxford on 22 May 1985.

== Family ==
In 1927, he married Sylvia Lucy Garstang, an alumna of Somerville College, Oxford, and a daughter of Walter Garstang, Professor of Zoology at the University of Leeds. Hardy and his wife had two children, Michael and Belinda.

== Works ==
Hardy wrote numerous scientific papers on plankton, fish and whales. He wrote two popular books in the New Naturalist series, and in later life he also wrote on religion.

Books

- The Open Sea. Its Natural History (Part I) The World of Plankton. New Naturalist No. 34, Collins, 1956.
- The Open Sea. Its Natural History (Part II) Fish & Fisheries. New Naturalist No. 37, Collins, 1959.
- The Living Stream: Evolution and Man. New York and Evanston: Harper & Row, Publishers. 1965 – via Internet Archive.
- The Divine Flame: An Essay Towards A Natural History of Religion. Collins. 1966 – via Internet Archive.
- The Spiritual Nature of Man: Study of Contemporary Religious Experience. Oxford University Press, 1979.

Papers

- The Herring in Relation to its Animate Environment. Fish. Invest. Lond., II, 7:3. 1951.
- (with E.R. Gunther) The Plankton of the South Georgia Whaling Grounds and Adjacent Waters, 1926-7. 'Discovery' Report, II, 1–146.

== Recognition ==
Hardy's "pioneering work" was recognised by South Georgia & South Sandwich Islands in 2011 with a set of four commemorative stamps bearing his image.

The University of Hull has named a building on its Hull Campus after Hardy.
