= Chicagoland Chamber of Commerce =

US non-profit organization

- Founded: October 9, 1904
- Type: Advocacy group
- Purpose: Non-profit focused on delivering value for its members, making Chicagoland a world-class place to live and work. The Chamber's three pillars are networking, advocacy and thought leadership.
- Location: Chicago, Illinois, United States
- Region served: United States
- Key people: Jack Lavin, President & CEO
- Website: Chicagoland Chamber of Commerce Official Website

The Chicagoland Chamber of Commerce is a non-profit organization promoting business in the Chicago metropolitan area of Illinois, United States. The organization is located in the Wrigley Building at 410 N. Michigan Avenue on Chicago's Magnificent Mile.

The Chicago Commercial Association and Industry, as it was originally known, formed in 1904. In June 1907, its name was changed to the Chicago Association of Commerce. Under that name, the Association launched several crimefighting efforts, including the Crime Commission in 1918, which was created to study crime and push for changes to state law, and the Crime Prevention and Punishment Committee, which was known popularly as the Secret Six, a well-funded vigilante organization founded in 1930 that solved kidnapping, extortion and other crimes before it dissolved in scandal in 1933. The Secret Six inspired a movie of the same name, helped Eliot Ness found the Untouchables, was credited by Al Capone for his downfall, and was emulated nationwide.

In 1992, the organization took on the name Chicagoland Chamber of Commerce.

The Chamber is headed by President and CEO, Jack Lavin.
