= Westinghouse Desilu Playhouse =

American TV anthology series (1958–60)

- Series title card
- Also known as: Desilu Playhouse
- Genre: Anthology
- Created by: Desi Arnaz
- Presented by: Desi Arnaz
- Narrated by: Betty Furness
- Theme music composer: Johnny Green
- Opening theme: "Westinghouse Logo"
- Ending theme: "Desilu Playhouse Closing Theme"
- Country of origin: United States
- No. of seasons: 2
- No. of episodes: 48

Production
- Executive producers: Bert Granet; Quinn Martin
- Producers: Desi Arnaz; Bert Granet
- Running time: 45–48 minutes
- Production company: Desilu Productions

Original release
- Network: CBS
- Release: October 6, 1958 – June 10, 1960

Related
- I Love Lucy; The Twilight Zone; The Untouchables

Westinghouse Desilu Playhouse is an American television anthology series produced by Desilu Productions. The show ran on the Columbia Broadcasting System (CBS) between 1958 and 1960. Three of its 48 episodes served as pilots for the 1950s television series The Twilight Zone (one episode) and The Untouchables (two episodes).

== History ==
Between 1951 and 1957, Desi Arnaz (1917–1986) and Lucille Ball (1911–1989) starred in and produced (via their Desilu production company) the immensely popular I Love Lucy show. In early 1958, Desi Arnaz convinced CBS to purchase Desilu Playhouse with the promise that a bi-monthly Lucille Ball–Desi Arnaz Show (later rebroadcast as The Lucy–Desi Comedy Hour) would be among the dramas, comedies and musicals planned for the show. Westinghouse Electric Company paid a then-record $12 million to sponsor the show, which resulted in the cancellation of the prestigious anthology series Studio One, also sponsored by Westinghouse.

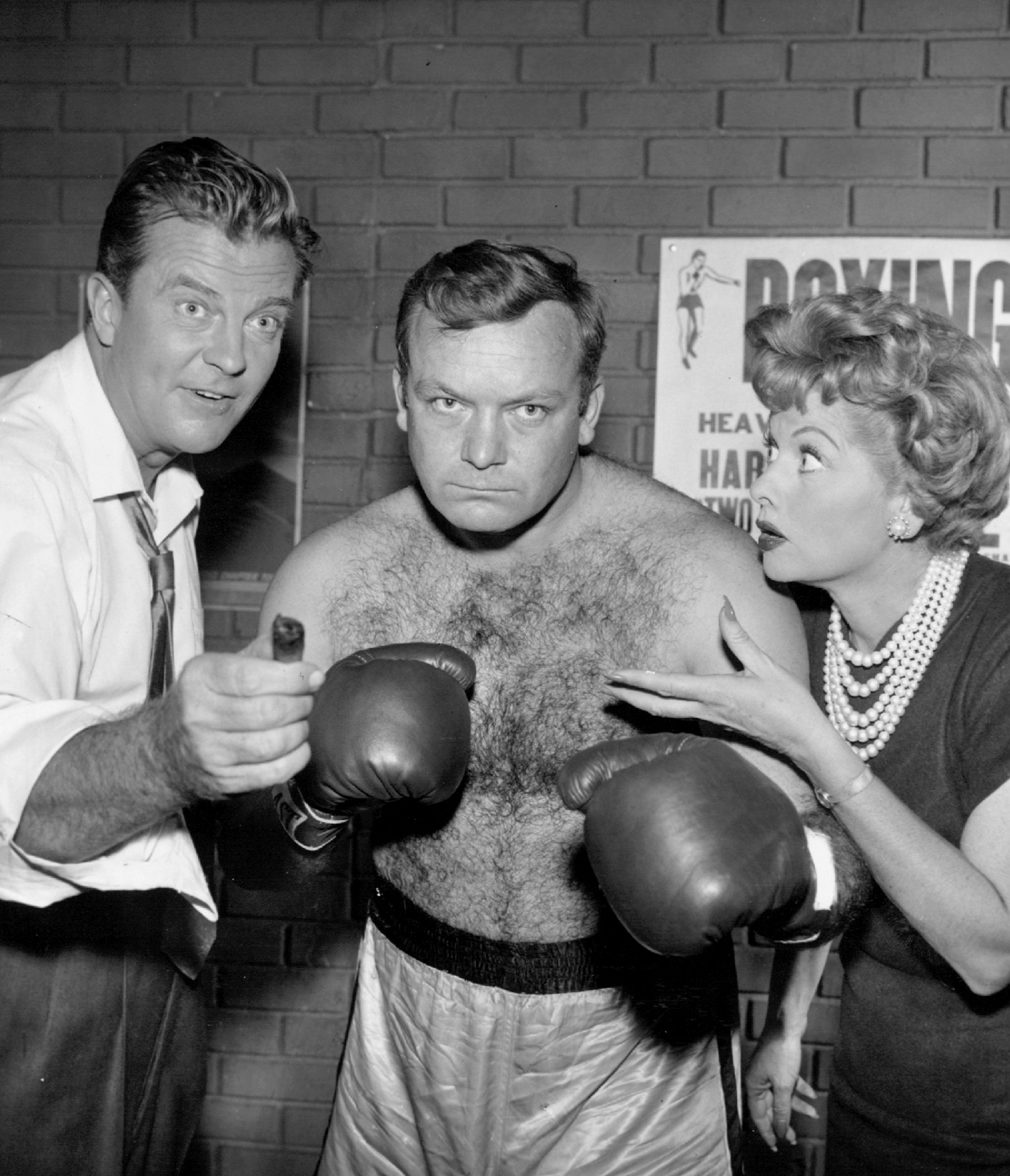
William Lundigan, Aldo Ray and Lucille Ball as the title character, "K. O. Kitty", the comedy shown as the show's fifth episode. Lucy plays a dance teacher who inherits a boxer's contract. (1958)

The show debuted on Monday nights in the 10:00–11:00 pm [Eastern Standard Time] evening time slot on October 6, 1958, hosted by Desi Arnaz, with Betty Furness continuing as the Westinghouse spokesperson (as she had been on Studio One). The first show was "Lucy Goes to Mexico," a Lucy–Desi Hour with guest star Maurice Chevalier. The dramatic "Bernadette" (a biography of the Roman Catholic Church's Saint Bernadette), starring Pier Angeli, premiered in week two. Later shows included comedies, dramas and musicals, and various one-off comedies and dramas starring Lucille Ball in non-"Lucy" character performances.

In October 1959, the show moved to Friday nights from 9:00–10:00 pm [Eastern Standard Time]. The show lasted only one more year, due to an inability to attract big guest stars, the growing popularity then of westerns and police shows being shown on prime time. It ran opposite the competing ABC television network's highly rated 77 Sunset Strip that season, and the Arnaz–Ball divorce in 1960. Just prior to their marital breakup, Ball and Arnaz, along with Vivian Vance, William Frawley, and Little Ricky, filmed the last Lucille Ball–Desi Arnaz Show, entitled "Lucy Meets The Moustache" and featuring guest stars Ernie Kovacs and Edie Adams. This last hour-long installment of the I Love Lucy format and characters was broadcast on April 1, 1960. The final telecast of The Westinghouse Desilu Playhouse, "Murder is a Private Affair", aired on June 10, 1960.

== Notable episodes ==
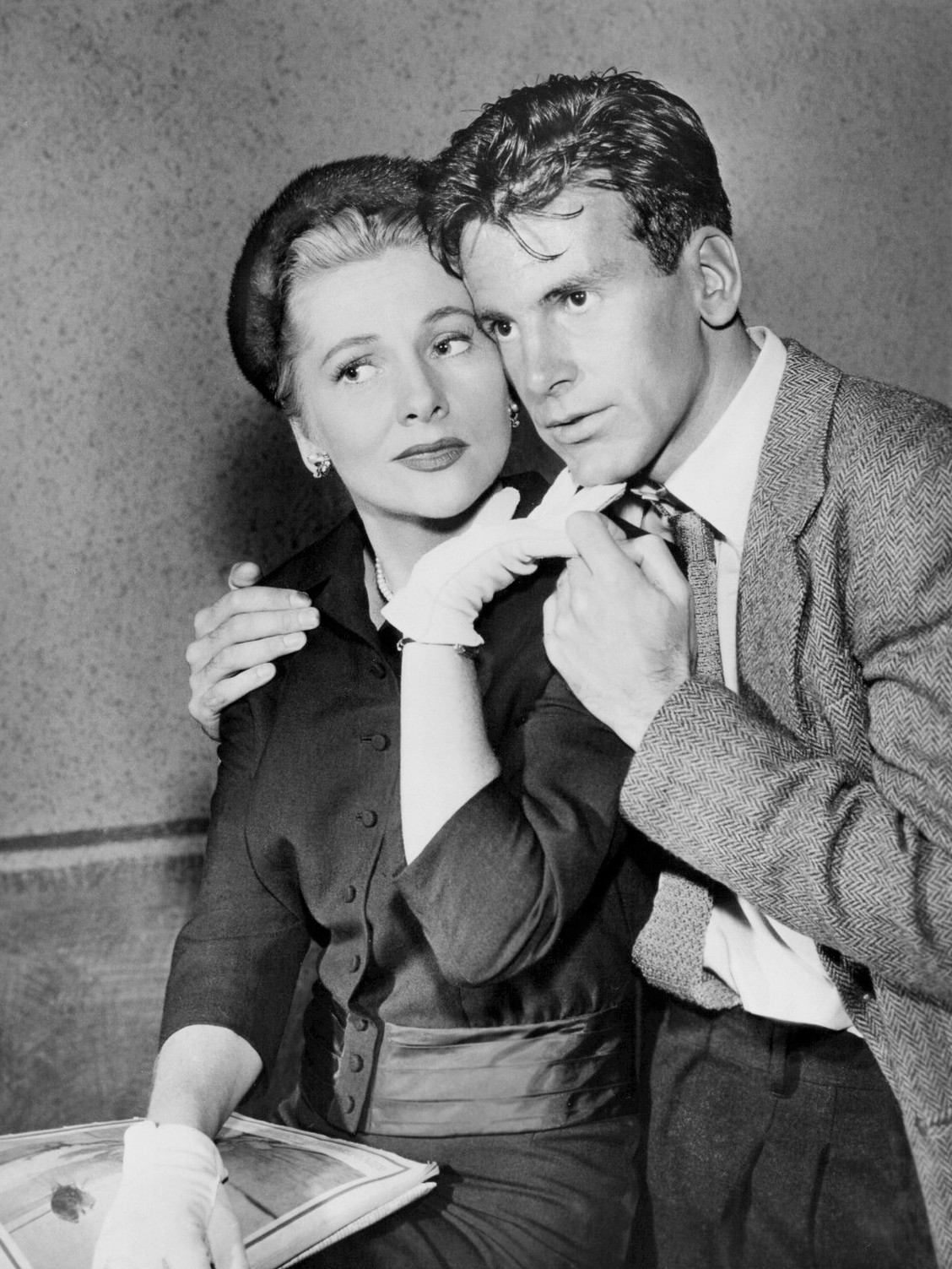
Joan Fontaine and Maximilian Schell appeared in the drama Perilous written by William Templeton in 1959.

In the fall of 1958, "The Time Element". starring William Bendix, aired to positive reviews. Written by Rod Serling, the show's popularity gave Serling the leverage to convince CBS to give the go-ahead to Serling's concept for a science fiction/fantasy anthology series (which was what Serling had in mind when writing "The Time Element") that he called The Twilight Zone which debuted in the fall of 1959.

In April 1959, Desilu Playhouse aired a two-part drama called "The Untouchables". Paul Monash adapted the 1957 memoirs of treasury agent Eliot Ness, played by Robert Stack. After CBS passed on the idea to produce a weekly version, The Untouchables became a hit series on ABC and ran for four seasons (1959–1963). Stack was selected only after the agent of Arnaz' personal choice, actor Van Johnson, demanded Johnson be paid for 2 episodes at $10,000 each (the normal rate). Arnaz, according to Stack, blew his top at Johnson, fired him and called Stack and offered him the role. Stack accepted at once and began filming the next day

== Production notes ==
=== Music ===
Music for the show was composed by John Waldo "Johnny" Green. The show opened with "Westinghouse Logo" and closed with "Desilu Playhouse Closing Theme" during the end credits.

=== Notable crew members ===
Several notable people contributed to one or more episodes of the show, including (in alphabetical order):

==== Producers ====
- Bert Granet
- Quinn Martin

==== Directors ====
- Robert Florey
- Claudio Guzmán
- Douglas Heyes
- Arthur Hiller
- Jerry Hopper
- Lamont Johnson
- Phil Karlson
- Buzz Kulik
- Robert Ellis Miller
- Ralph Nelson
- Joseph M. Newman
- Ted Post
- Jerry Thorpe

==== Writers ====
- James B. Allardice
- Madelyn Davis
- Oscar Fraley
- John Mantley
- Eliot Ness
- Rod Serling
- William Templeton

==== Actors ====
- Desi Arnaz
- Lucille Ball
- Jane Russell
- Martin Balsam
- Parley Baer
- John Drew Barrymore
- Richard Benedict
- John Beradino
- Warren Berlinger
- Neville Brand
- Rory Calhoun
- Wally Cassell
- Pat Crowley
- Frank DeKova
- Buddy Ebsen
- Abel Fernandez
- Wallace Ford
- William Frawley
- Betty Furness
- Bruce Gordon
- Jean Hagen
- Donald Harron
- Earl Holliman
- Vivi Janiss
- Richard Keith
- Barton MacLane
- Joe Mantell
- Margo
- John McIntire
- Sid Melton
- Martin Milner
- Cameron Mitchell
- George Murphy
- Barbara Nichols
- Hugh O'Brian
- Roger Perry
- Paul Picerni
- Aldo Ray
- Joe De Santis
- Karen Sharpe
- Mickey Simpson
- Red Skelton
- Patricia Smith
- Robert Stack
- Harry Dean Stanton
- Barry Sullivan
- Carol Thurston
- Vivian Vance
- Bill Williams
- Walter Winchell
- James Westerfield
- Jack Weston
- Jesse White
- James Whitmore
- Ed Wynn
- Keenan Wynn

== Aftermath ==
Westinghouse bought CBS in 1995, and renamed itself after its prime asset in 1997.
