= Secret Six (Chicago) =

Business-backed vigilante group (1930–33)

- Part of Chicagoland Chamber of Commerce (previously the Chicago Association of Commerce)
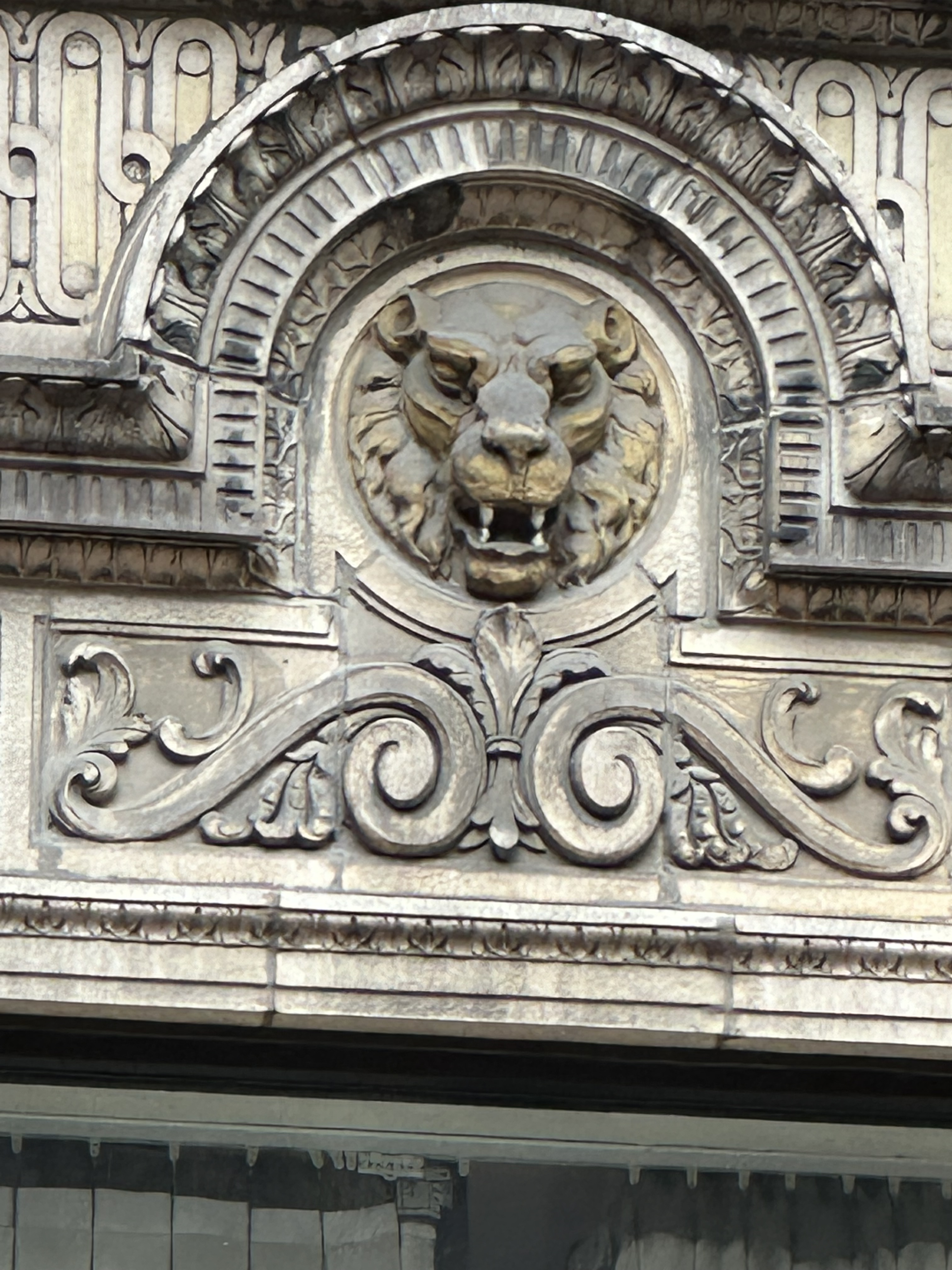
- Architectural detail from the exterior of the St. Clair Hotel, which served as the Secret Six's makeshift jail
- Operation name: Secret Six
- Part of: Chicagoland Chamber of Commerce (previously the Chicago Association of Commerce)
- Type: Vigilante
- Scope: Chicago, Illinois but with efforts nationwide

Participants
- Initiated by: Col. Robert Isham Randolph

Mission
- Objective: Investigation and prosecution of murder, bombing, kidnapping, extortion, bank robbery and other crimes in Chicago and elsewhere, with a particular focus on racketeers, including Al Capone

Timeline
- Date begin: February 8, 1930
- Date end: January 17, 1933
- Duration: 3 years

The Secret Six, officially known as the Crime Prevention and Punishment Committee of the Chicago Association of Commerce (CAC), was a well-funded and powerful vigilante enterprise established by the Association (now the Chicagoland Chamber of Commerce) in February 1930. The group inspired a movie by the same name, was credited by Al Capone for his downfall, helped launch Eliot Ness and his Untouchables, and briefly served as a model for vigilante organizations across America. The Secret Six investigated dozens of bombings, kidnappings, extortion cases, bank robberies, and other crimes, solving some of them and winning nationwide fame. However, after a series of mistakes and scandals, including accusations of bigamy, recklessness, and other improprieties against its agents, and a widely-publicized false-arrest lawsuit, the organization folded in January 1933.

== Formation ==
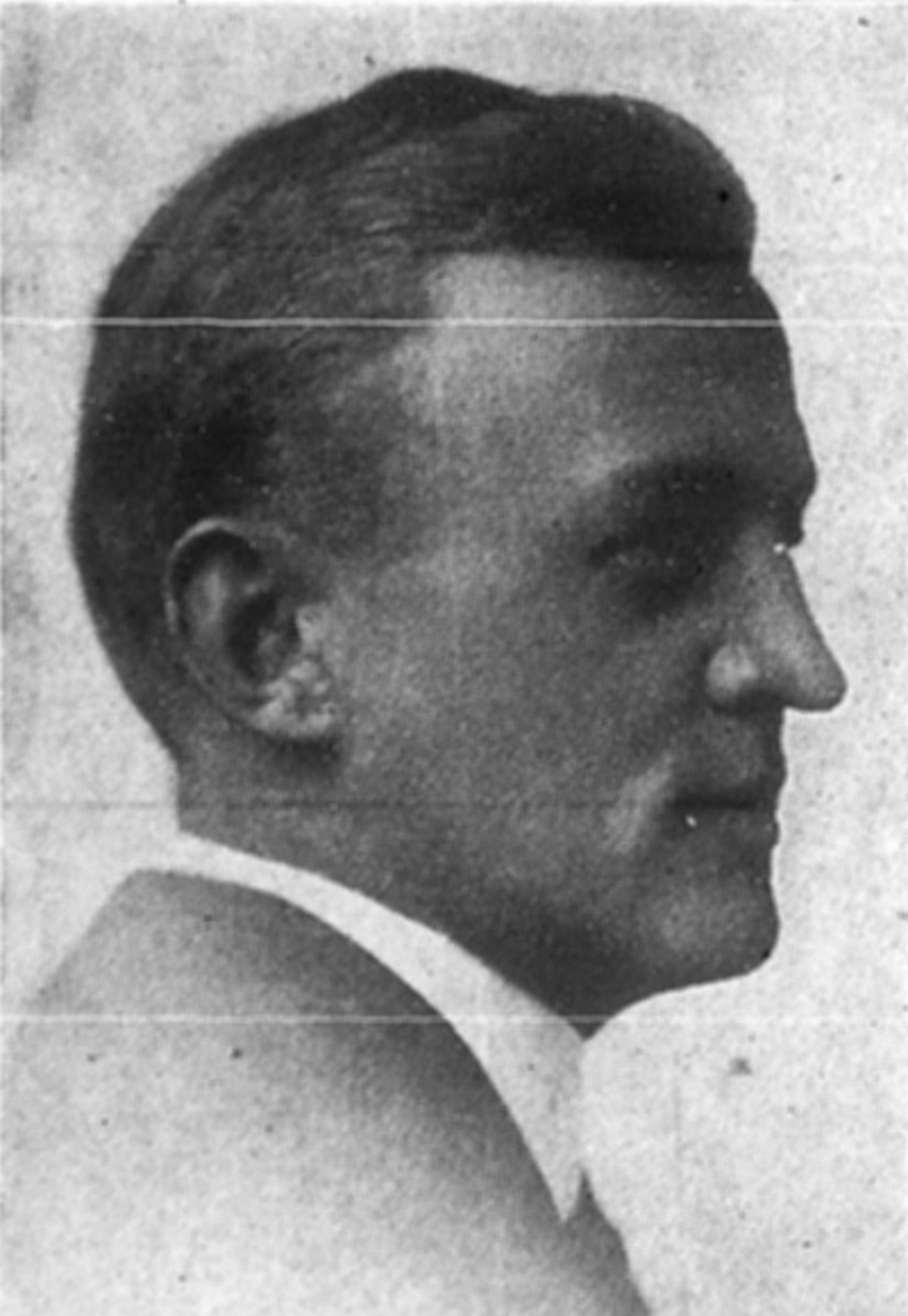
Col. Robert Isham Randolph, 1920

Although Chicago had been plagued throughout the 1920s by bombings, robberies, gang murders and other problems, the direct impetus of the Secret Six's formation was the shooting of construction superintendent Philip Meagher on February 5, 1930. Meagher had been supervising the building of the Lying-In Hospital (later part of the University of Chicago Hospitals) at 59th and Maryland Avenue, and was shot while walking near the site. Meagher, who survived for at least several days after the shooting, speculated the crime was the result of labor unrest. On February 7, 1930, two days after the shooting, and reportedly under pressure from Meagher's employer, Harrison Barnard, CAC president Colonel Robert Isham Randolph announced the formation of a crime prevention committee. Randolph said he would lead the effort and, according to some reports, would appoint six of his fellow businessmen to help run it. When he declined to reveal the names of the other officers, “Secret Six” emerged as the name for the committee.

== Major Cases ==
Within weeks of the Secret Six’s nationally-publicized founding in February 1930, victims of crime in Chicago and beyond were turning first to the group instead of the Chicago Police Department, which was widely seen as underfunded and corrupt. The first major victory for the vigilantes came in the kidnapping and extortion of Theodore Kopelman, a wealthy Chicago insurance executive. After holding Kopelman for 60 hours at a cottage in Wisconsin, threatening him with torture, and getting $4,000 from his friends, Kopelman’s kidnappers (one of whom was his ex-wife) freed him on the condition he would quickly pay them another $21,000. Kopelman called the Secret Six, the vigilantes notified State’s Attorney Chief Investigator Patrick Roche, and a sting was set up in which the kidnappers were captured when they came to pick up the money. Three men were convicted in the crime and received 20 years each.

Other notable cases worked by the Secret Six:

- In 1928, Oscar Stanton De Priest became the first Black person elected to Congress in the 20th Century, and the first ever elected from the northern states. In September 1930, he received extortion letters threatening him with death if he didn’t pay $10,000. He called the Secret Six, who told him to pay a portion of the money as instructed while they set up a sting involving other law enforcement officials. Julius Link, a minor Chicago politician, was convicted of the crime.
- Verner Daniels, the Black owner of several illegal stills in Chicago, called the Secret Six to complain that Chicago police officers were stopping by regularly to demand money in exchange for not shutting down his business. In a sting set up by the Secret Six, officers Oliver J. McCormick and Peter J. Lowery were arrested on federal charges.
- After rumors surfaced in February 1931 that Chicago merchants were maintaining inaccurate scales in an illicit money-making scheme, the Secret Six paid women to shop at the suspect stores and bring back the purchased meat and other goods for accurate weighing. The investigation led to the conviction of Chicago City Sealer Daniel Serritella, who was responsible for the accuracy of city scales, and his chief deputy, Harry Hochstein, both of whom were found to have accepted bribes from the short-weighting merchants. Both received prison sentences in May 1932, but those sentences were overturned in late 1933.
- In autumn 1932, when Patrick Carey of the Chicago tax assessor’s office asked for a bribe to lower the property taxes of the Story & Clark Piano Company, company officials called the Secret Six, and the vigilantes set up a sting in which the bribe was paid with marked bills. Arrested in the case were Carey and deputy tax assessor Art Hollaman.
- After serving stateside as a U. S. Marine during World War I, Jacob Karchmer was repeatedly accused of fraud while collecting money for veteran’s causes, unemployed girls, the blind, and other groups. He moved his operation to Chicago sometime in the early 1930s, where he founded the Chicago Infants Free Milk Depot. The Secret Six assigned Florence Johnson to investigate. She got a job as a clerk at the charity, kept meticulous records, and was the primary witness at Karchmer’s March 1932 federal fraud trial, where he was convicted and sentenced to two years in prison.
- Gustav Miller, 23, of Joliet, Illinois, was kidnapped in April 1932, and the Secret Six were brought into the case at some point during his nine days of captivity. The vigilantes told the family they knew who four of the kidnappers were and proposed a plan to get Miller back and capture the criminals. However, someone in the Miller family, while negotiating with the kidnappers on what was originally a $50,000 ransom, told them of the Secret Six’s involvement. The kidnappers, apparently wary of the Secret Six’s reputation, subsequently freed Miller for $2,500, foiling the Secret Six’s plan.
- Like Gustav Miller, wealthy Chicago banker Norman Collins was freed when his kidnappers learned of the Secret Six’s involvement. He and his wife Alice Colllins were abducted on the way to the train station on the morning of October 10, 1932. Released later that day to collect the $5,000 ransom, Mrs. Collins called her husband’s colleagues, who called the Secret Six. She’d been instructed by the kidnappers to drive her car repeatedly around a set path in Chicago until someone showed up to take the money, so the Secret Six drove the path instead, one of them disguised as Mrs. Collins and others, heavily armed, following in a second car. A third team of Secret Six operatives patrolled the area as “clerks, conductors and street laborers.” That night, presumably because they’d learned of the Secret Six’s involvement, the kidnappers released Mr. Collins unharmed and without a ransom.

== The Secret Six and the Third Degree ==
The “third degree,” common slang for an intensive police interrogation featuring unconstitutional abuse or even torture, was publicly endorsed by the founder of the Secret Six, Col. Robert Isham Randolph, in an article that began on the front page of the August 7, 1932, edition of the New York Herald Tribune Magazine. In the article, Randolph wrote that “The purpose of the ‘third degree’ is not primarily to compel the defendant to testify against himself, but to disclose the truth. . . . No innocent man could properly object to telling all he knows about the crime of which he is accused, and any means that is available to test the truth of his testimony ought to be properly and legally admissible.” Randolph advised against the use of “the fist, the rubber hose or any other weapon,” but only because such an item was “too likely to leave its mark.” Instead, he wrote, “I have known of a telephone book being used very effectively as a weapon. In the hands of a strong man it can knock a victim silly and not leave any mark.”

Randolph proposed that third degree methods practiced by contemporary American police departments surely didn’t match the “inquisitorial horrors” of the Middle Ages and were “probably nowhere as cruel as the public imagination pictures it.” He added, “I doubt very much that it ever amounts to more than a beating or continued questioning to wear down a physically and mentally tired victim to the point of non-resistance and confession of the truth or something sufficiently near it to satisfy the inquisitor.”

Randolph implied but did not explicitly state that these methods had been used by the Secret Six. “In a recent kidnaping case,” Randolph wrote, “the two ringleaders in the criminal conspiracy were apprehended after their guilt had been definitely established by their own conversation, heard over tapped telephone wires and a cleverly concealed Dictaphone in the room of the chief conspirator. This information was not evidence, and it was necessary to get an admission from one or both of them to complete the case against them and arrest the other parties to the conspiracy. One of them finally broke down and confessed.” The second suspect was confronted with the evidence, Randolph wrote, and “he admitted his part, and the two confessions aided in the apprehension and conviction of the rest of the gang.”

Randolph was most likely referring to the kidnapping in March 1932 of Dr. James Parker, a Peoria physician and businessman, who was abducted in his garage and held for more than two weeks before he was released, unharmed and without payment of the ransom, in early April 1932. According to press reports, operatives of the Secret Six suspected Peoria lawyer Joseph Persifull of being involved in the abduction, and they tapped his phone and placed listening devices in his office that ran to a Dictaphone in the basement. When he called failed Peoria mayoral candidate James Betson about the kidnapping, the Secret Six picked up both men and imprisoned them in an attic in Peoria, where more electronic listening devices had been set up and a hole in the wall allowed a Secret Six agent to watch the men. On the basis of evidence gathered by the Secret Six through that and other means, formal charges were filed against Persifull, Betson, and almost a dozen others. Newspaper articles published at the time of Betson’s arrest supported Randolph’s hints that torture was used. For example, according to one story, Betson, “informed his lawyer that the officers had beaten him severely in an effort to obtain a confession from him. He accused Alexander Jamie and Sergt. Steffens, Chicago, as his assailants.” According to another article, “Betson charged that after being taken into custody last Thursday evening, Alexander Jamie of the Chicago ‘Secret Six’ and other officers of the same organization beat and kicked him severely.” While claims of police abuse typically lead to the dropping of charges in criminal cases in the United States, the alleged abuse of Betson seemed to have had no impact on the case. Eight people were convicted, with sentences ranging from five to 25 years.

== Publicity ==
While their name suggests the Secret Six was a secret operation, the group seems to have both welcomed and sought out publicity, with tens of thousands of newspaper articles published about the group worldwide, apparently with the vigilantes’ full cooperation, between 1930 and 1933. Secret Six founder Col. Robert Isham Randolph gave frequent interviews, testified before Congress about kidnapping, spoke in cities across America, and wrote often about crime for the national press.

Alexander Jamie, a former Prohibition agent hired by the Secret Six in October 1930 as its chief investigator, also granted interviews and authored a series of articles about fighting crime.

Thousands of newspaper articles, further, mentioned the involvement of the Secret Six in dozens of cases, and often provided the names of individual Secret Six detectives and agents, suggesting those identities were provided voluntarily.

== Members ==
While claims that there were six secret members of the Secret Six were made at times by Col. Randolph, the organization’s founder, and names of wealthy Chicago businessmen have been offered up through the years as possible members, author Kevin Meredith has compiled considerable evidence against the idea that six specific businessmen comprised the Secret Six, or that they played any law enforcement role.

In his 2026 book, The Secret Six, Meredith cited contemporary newspaper reports that challenged the idea of a specific crime-fighting six, and pointed to circumstantial evidence as well. One key newspaper article, authored by Secret Six Chief Detective Alexander Jamie and published as part of a syndicated series in early 1932, included this passage:

The name Secret Six is really a misnomer. When the committee of business men was formed to combat crime, Colonel Randolph was asked how many members the committee would contain. Careful, then as now, not to reveal secrets of the organization, Colonel Randolph replied: ‘That is hard to say; maybe 150 members, maybe only six members.’ For the lack of a better name, the newspaper reporters termed our organization ‘The Secret Six.’”

Although Jamie dismissed the notion of six secret specific crime fighting businessmen, the rumor has persisted through the decades. Among those making that claim was Prohibition agent Eliot Ness, who was Jamie’s brother-in-law. In his 1957 book, The Untouchables, Ness credited Jamie and Col. Randolph for convincing U.S. District Attorney George Emmerson Q. Johnson to give Ness his special commission to go after Chicago’s illegal brewers and distillers. Contrary to Jamie’s disavowal of a specific six businessmen crimefighters, Ness described the Secret Six in his book as six men “gambling with their lives, unarmed, to accomplish what three thousand police and three hundred prohibition agents had failed miserably to accomplish.”

James Doherty, who reported on the Secret Six for The Chicago Tribune, also promoted the idea of six specific businessmen crimefighters, writing in 1951, "To this day there has been no disclosure of the identity of the crime fighters known as the Secret Six. Even I don’t know them and I gave them the name that went all over the world in 1930."

In a scrapbook found years after his death, and the only known instance in which someone claimed to have been one of the six, Harrison Barnard wrote on Doherty's 1951 article, "I was one of the Secret Six."

Further, U.S. Bureau of Investigation reports (1932) indicate that Robert Isham Randolph, Julius Rosenwald (president of Sears, Roebuck and Company), and Frank J. Loesch belonged to the Secret Six. In interviews Randolph gave to the press after Capone's conviction, he disclosed that Samuel Insull, the utilities magnate, and Rosenwald were in the Secret Six. Judge John H. Lyle (1960), who was directly involved in the private war on Capone, named Edward E. Gore, Samuel Insull, and George A. Paddock as members of the Secret Six.

Countering such accounts, Meredith noted that the actual police work of the Secret Six was performed by dozens of agents and detectives, some of whom were on loan from the Chicago Police Department, and who were named repeatedly in newspaper coverage of the vigilantes’ exploits. The group’s publicly identified personnel, as discovered in a review by Meredith of thousands of newspaper articles about the group, included Paul B. Shoop, C. A. Harned, Hal Roberts, Dan Kooken, O. W. “Buck” Kempster, Roy Steffen, Charley A. Touzinsky, Charles Jasinski, Tommy Crawford, Wallace Jamie, Edward Farr, George “Chief” Redston, Walter Walker, Edward G. Wright, Marshall Solberg, William Knowles, Leo Carr, Edgar “Ed” Dudley, James B. Kerr, Louis Nichols, Joseph Altmeier, Shirley Kub, and Michael Ahern.

That these Secret Six employees would need or want wealthy, well-known Chicago businessmen with no law enforcement experience to work with them on actual police work—conducting stings and stakeouts, surveilling suspects, setting up wiretaps, interrogating witnesses, recovering stolen goods etc.—seems unlikely, Meredith asserted in his book. The chief contribution to the Secret Six of any of Chicago’s business leaders was most likely limited to giving money, a fact alluded to by Col. Randolph at the January 1932 funeral of one of the long-rumored members, Julius Rosenwald. In his eulogy, Randolph recalled only that Rosenwald provided funds to the group; he made no mention of any actual police work Rosenwald did.

== The Secret Six and Al Capone ==
A goal of the Secret Six from their inception was the prosecution of Al Capone. Although the vigilantes played little or no role in Capone’s 1931 conviction on federal income tax evasion, they impacted him both directly and indirectly, ultimately winning credit from the gangster (probably mistakenly) for destroying his illicit liquor business.

Within a day of the announcement of the Secret Six’s founding, and probably inspired by it, Chicago Police Chief William Russell ordered a crackdown on Chicagoans suspected of criminal activity in the city. In what became known as the “Chicago Plan,” more than 2,000 suspects were picked up in the first three days of Russell’s drive, and it was briefly paused after a week only because the city’s jails were full.

Capone was in prison in Pennsylvania at the time of the Secret Six’s founding, sentenced to a year there for gun possession, but upon his release in March 1930, he returned to Chicago and was subjected to the same aggressive police tactics, including being ordered to meet with various local law enforcement officials. Assistant State’s Attorney Harry S. Ditchburne, during his meeting with Capone, accused the kingpin of involvement in the Saint Valentine's Day Massacre and other crimes, all of which Capone denied.

In April 1930, possibly as a result of pressure in Chicago, Capone headed to his island estate in Miami Beach, Florida, where authorities launched the Secret Six-inspired Chicago Plan against him, arresting him every time he left his home, and tracking down his associates and business partners as well, until a local judge ordered a halt to the harassment.

Capone returned to Chicago in August 1930, where he faced a growing list of problems—increasing conflict with George “Bugs” Moran and his gang, an attack on his breweries by Eliot Ness and other Prohibition officials, the ongoing federal case against him for failure to pay his income taxes, and attention from the Secret Six. In particular, the vigilantes worked without success to pin the 1924 murder of minor Chicago gangster Joe Howard on Capone, reportedly spending thousands of dollars to research the crime. Col. Randolph, further, authored several articles offering up financial details of the gangster’s criminal enterprises, and proposing ideas for bringing him down, particularly by ending Prohibition. Randolph also claimed on multiple occasions that the Secret Six paid to have a Capone bookkeeper take a three-month South American cruise so he could not be murdered before he testified against Capone in his federal income tax trial. Randolph’s story was questioned by federal prosecutors, however, who told the Chicago Tribune they had no knowledge of such a witness.

Despite the enmity between the two men, Randolph and Capone met cordially at least once, according to several newspaper reports. Details of the meeting differed, however. Capone said he met Col. Randolph in Florida and offered to put an end to bombings, endemic in Chicago at the time, in exchange for the right to run his liquor business without interference from the Secret Six. Randolph, however, said the meeting took place at the Lexington Hotel, on Chicago’s Michigan Avenue, where Capone reportedly rented out a whole floor by the year. According to Randolph, Capone said that the Secret Six was hurting his business by raiding his breweries and gambling houses and tapping his telephone wires, and he warned that if he was shut down, the nearly 200 gunmen and ex-convicts on his payroll would be unemployed. Capone, according to Randolph, promised to make Chicago crime free if the Secret Six would stop harassing him. Randolph refused the deal, but it’s not clear he could have followed through anyway. Brewery raids and wiretaps were typically the purview of federal Prohibition agents. However, after he’d been sentenced for income tax evasion, but before he reported to prison, Capone was still giving the vigilantes credit. “The Secret Six has licked the rackets,” Capone told a reporter for the Chicago Herald and Examiner. “They’ve licked me. They’ve made it so there’s no money in the game any more. Most of the fellows who’ve been working with me realize this as well as I do.”

== National emulation and ambition ==
In the early 1930s, criminality spawned by the Great Depression, combined with the automobile and a growing national highway system, created a class of highly mobile outlaws who could roam from state to state kidnapping and robbing with impunity. Because the Federal Bureau of Investigation still lacked the funds and authority to prosecute federal crime when the Secret Six was founded in 1930, the Chicago vigilantes emerged as a de facto national police force, investigating crimes and arresting suspects well beyond Chicago, and even placing an agent in Los Angeles in September 1931. Dozens of cities, directly inspired by the Secret Six, created their own versions of the group, although the names and functions varied. In New York City, a secret law enforcement group patterned after the Secret Six was established by the Board of Trade. In Buffalo, NY, the “Secret 16” went after prostitution and other vices. In Angola, NY, a group comparing themselves to Chicago’s Secret Six sought to recover funds from a shuttered bank. Efforts mirroring Chicago’s vigilantes appeared in other cities in Illinois, as well as in cities and towns in Kansas, Nebraska, New Jersey, South Carolina, Ohio, Louisiana, Georgia, Missouri, and Alabama. Newspaper editorialists called for Secret Sixes in California and Minnesota. A group of boys at Oceanside (NY) High School who were inspired by The Secret Six movie formed the Secret Seven, brought two classmates suspected of thievery down to the basement, hung them from steam pipes, and beat them with sneakers.

In February 1932, in a speech to the Pittsburgh Chamber of Commerce, Col. Randolph referenced this trend toward national emulation and called for Secret Sixes in all major American cities. He and Alexander Jamie claimed repeatedly in syndicated newspaper articles at that time that only the Secret Six could defeat what they claimed—every few months, without offering any concrete evidence, but which invariably generated nationwide newspaper coverage—were national kidnapping and bank robbing corporations.

Col. Randolph may have harbored ambitions, never fulfilled, to lead a national vigilante force. In early 1932, Frank Loesch, his friend and a nationally-respected expert in crimefighting, proposed that an “interstate organization should be formed of citizens” with a leader who was an “experienced man, publicly known, who would give his whole time to the work.”

== Downfall of the Secret Six ==
Among the scandals and mistakes that led to the end of the Secret Six in January 1933:

- The arrest of William Speer Kuhn Jr. in the “poison dart” extortion of 18-year-old socialite Marion Wright. The lead investigator in the case, Edgar “Ed” Dudley (who would later go to Los Angeles, seduce and marry the woman he was hired to protect, and begin an affair with a 16-year-old girl from West Virginia), ignored exonerating evidence in the case, which was quickly dropped by Chicago authorities. Kuhn, who had been held in a makeshift Secret Six jail for several days, sued and won in December 1932.
- A year after the historic September 1930 robbery of the Lincoln National Bank, Capone henchman Gus Winkler was arrested for the crime. Secret Six detective Roy Steffen negotiated with him for the return of the bonds in exchange for not prosecuting him for the robbery. In January 1932, Steffen recovered $583,000 in bonds, as well as proof that $2,217,000 in bonds had been destroyed and could be reissued. But the deal was condemned by many observers, including Nebraska Governor Charles W. Bryan, prompting Steffen and the Secret Six to offer a new story, possibly completely made up, in which the robbers returned the bonds because Steffen was about to raid their hideout.
- In November 1932, extortionists sought $4,000 from wealthy banker Solomon Smith, backing up their demand with a small bomb sent through the mail that detonated when it was opened by his wife, Fredrika Shumway Smith. Mr. Smith summoned the Secret Six, who investigated without calling police or postal authorities, outraging local officials. Among the measures, all unsuccessful, taken by the Secret Six to catch the extortionists was the placing of a bomb in a public forest preserve, further angering authorities.
- In September 1932, Secret Six operatives learned that their South La Salle Street offices had been wiretapped by John Swanson, the state’s attorney for Chicago and Cook County. The discovery touched off two months of conflict between the vigilantes and Swanson, who had previously worked closely with the Secret Six and had been credited with inspiring the group’s creation. Col. Randolph accused Swanson and others in his office of accepting bribes, and Swanson countered by accusing Secret Six operatives of corruption and bigamy. Swanson subpoenaed Randolph and other Secret Six officials to give them the opportunity to back up their accusations to a grand jury, but no Secret Six official was able to document their claims.
- In 1922, Shirley Kub, a 32-year-old wife and mother of three, had an affair with 18-year-old Stanley White that ended when the teen was shot in the head by Kub’s jealous husband. In the early 1930s, Kub would be sentenced to prison several times, for jewelry theft and for refusing to testify to a Chicago grand jury after making sensational claims about corruption in the Chicago Police Department. In 1931, while already married to a Black man named Ned Ragland, she married a car thief named George Meuller. Despite her notoriety, the Secret Six hired her as a detective at some point in 1931 or 1932. When she showed up to investigate a restaurant bombing in January 1933, newly-elected Chicago Mayor Anton Cermak, aware of her reputation, withdrew police support from the Secret Six, which led to the demise of the organization.

== Later years ==
Attempts by Alexander Jamie to revive the Secret Six as a not-for-profit detective agency fizzled, but he turned up in Saint Paul, Minnesota in 1935, investigating official corruption there.

Col. Randolph was named director of operations and maintenance and chief of police for the Chicago Century of Progress Exposition, commonly known as the Chicago World’s Fair, which drew millions of visitors between May 1933 and October 1934. Randolph, who claimed during a 1939 visit to New York City that the Secret Six was the best answer to shutting down the regimes of Adolf Hitler and Benito Mussolini, returned to military service during World War II, rising to the rank of full colonel as a transportation officer at the Seattle Port of Embarkation.
