= The Untouchables (film) =

1987 American film by Brian De Palma

- Theatrical release poster
- Directed by: Brian De Palma
- Screenplay by: David Mamet
- Based on: The Untouchables (1957 book) by: Eliot Ness; Oscar Fraley
- Produced by: Art Linson
- Starring: Kevin Costner; Charles Martin Smith; Andy García; Robert De Niro; Sean Connery
- Cinematography: Stephen H. Burum
- Edited by: Gerald B. Greenberg; Bill Pankow
- Music by: Ennio Morricone
- Production company: Paramount Pictures
- Distributed by: Paramount Pictures
- Release dates: June 2, 1987 (New York City, premiere); June 3, 1987 (U.S.)
- Running time: 119 minutes
- Country: United States
- Language: English
- Budget: $25 million
- Box office: $187 million

The Untouchables is a 1987 American crime film directed by Brian De Palma, produced by Art Linson and written by David Mamet. It stars Kevin Costner, Charles Martin Smith, Andy García, Robert De Niro and Sean Connery. Set in 1930 Chicago, the film follows Eliot Ness (Costner) as he forms the Untouchables team to bring Al Capone (De Niro) to justice during Prohibition. It is the fourth film on which De Niro and De Palma collaborated, after Greetings (1968, De Niro's first lead in a feature role), The Wedding Party (1969) and Hi, Mom! (1970).

The screenplay is loosely based on Ness's and Oscar Fraley's 1957 book The Untouchables and the real-life events on which it is based, although most of its plot is fictionalized. The Academy Award-nominated, Grammy Award-winning score is composed by Ennio Morricone and features period music by Duke Ellington.

The Untouchables premiered on June 2, 1987, in New York City, and went into general release by Paramount Pictures on June 3, 1987, in the United States. The film grossed $187 million worldwide and received generally positive reviews from critics. It was nominated for four Academy Awards; Connery won the Academy Award for Best Supporting Actor, as well as the Golden Globe Award for Best Supporting Actor – Motion Picture.

== Plot ==
In 1930, during Prohibition, the notorious gangland boss Al Capone supplies illegal liquor and controls most of Chicago. Bureau of Prohibition agent Eliot Ness has been tasked with halting Capone's activities by hitting a warehouse with crates shipped from Canada, but his first attempt at a liquor raid fails due to corrupt policemen alerting Capone.

He soon encounters veteran Irish-American officer James Malone, who opposes the rampant corruption and offers to help Ness, suggesting that they find a man from the police academy who is not yet under Capone's influence and still believes in the idealistic aspects of law enforcement. They recruit Italian-American trainee George Stone (born Giuseppe Petri) for his superior marksmanship and integrity. Joined by accountant Oscar Wallace, they successfully raid a Capone liquor warehouse and start to gain positive publicity, with the press dubbing them The Untouchables. During an organizational dinner team meeting, Capone kills the warehouse manager with a baseball bat to warn his other subordinates.

Discovering that Capone has not filed an income tax return for four years, Wallace suggests trying to build a tax evasion case against him, as Capone's network keeps him well insulated from his other crimes. Crooked alderman John O'Shea offers Ness a bribe to drop his investigation, but Ness refuses. After Capone's enforcer Frank Nitti threatens Ness' family, Ness immediately moves his pregnant wife Catherine and their daughter to a safe house. In a subsequent raid on the Canadian border with the assistance of some Mounties, Ness and his team intercept an incoming liquor shipment, killing several gangsters and capturing a Capone bookkeeper named George, who ends up agreeing to help them testify against his employer. Back in Chicago, Nitti, dressed as a policeman, murders Wallace and George in the elevator of the police station and leaves a taunting message for Ness. Ness confronts Capone at the Lexington Hotel after the murders, but Malone intervenes, urging Ness to focus on persuading the district attorney not to dismiss the charges against Capone.

Realizing that police chief Mike Dorsett betrayed Wallace and George earlier on, Malone forces Dorsett to reveal where Capone's accountant Walter Payne is hiding, then tells Ness to meet him to plan their next move. After Malone returns home, Capone's henchmen attack him. He chases one away with a shotgun, but Nitti ambushes him with a Thompson submachine gun before retreating. Ness and Stone arrive to find Malone mortally wounded, but before dying he manages to tell them which train Payne will take to leave town.

As Ness and Stone await Payne's arrival at Chicago Union Station, Ness notices a young mother with two suitcases and her baby in a carriage laboriously climbing the lobby steps. Ness ultimately decides to assist her, but the gangsters guarding Payne appear just as Ness and the woman reach the top of the stairs, and a bloody shootout occurs. Although outnumbered, Ness and Stone manage to capture Payne alive and kill all the gangsters, keeping both the mother and child unharmed.

When Payne testifies at Capone's trial, Ness observes that Capone appears strangely calm. He then sees Nitti is wearing a gun in the courtroom and has a bailiff remove him. Outside the courtroom, Ness searches Nitti and finds a note from Chicago Mayor William Hale Thompson that effectively permits him to carry the weapon. Ness is frustrated until he discovers that Nitti also has a matchbook with Malone's address written inside his coat, which causes Ness to realize that Nitti is Malone's killer. In a panic, Nitti brandishes his gun and shoots the bailiff before fleeing to the courthouse roof. Ness eventually apprehends him and prepares to take him in custody, but then Nitti insults the memory of Malone and gloats that he will escape conviction for the murder; this enrages Ness and instead he tosses Nitti off the roof to his death, avenging both Wallace and Malone.

Back in the courtroom, Stone gives Ness a list – taken from Nitti's coat – which shows that the jurors in the trial are all on Capone's payroll, thereby explaining Capone's calm and overconfident demeanor earlier on. Ness secretly persuades the judge to switch Capone's jury with one hearing an unrelated divorce case, and the judge relents after Ness tricks him into believing that his name is on Capone's payroll as well. This prompts Capone's lawyer to enter a guilty plea against Capone's wishes; as Capone furiously objects in a violent outburst, Ness victoriously taunts him by repeating Malone's motto: "Never stop fighting until the fight is done. Here endeth the lesson". Capone is ultimately convicted of tax evasion and sentenced to 11 years in prison.

On the day of Capone's sentencing, Ness closes up his office and meets up with Stone to part ways with him; he gives Malone's St. Jude medallion and callbox key to Stone as a farewell present. As Ness leaves the police station, a reporter asks him what he will do after the probable repeal of Prohibition; Ness replies "I think I'll have a drink" before walking away.

== Cast ==
- Kevin Costner as Eliot Ness
- Sean Connery as Jimmy Malone
- Charles Martin Smith as Oscar Wallace
- Andy Garcia as George Stone
- Robert De Niro as Al Capone
- Richard Bradford as Chief Mike Dorsett
- Jack Kehoe as Walter Payne
- Brad Sullivan as George
- Billy Drago as Frank Nitti
- Patricia Clarkson as Catherine Ness
- Vito D'Ambrosio as Bowtie Driver
- Steven Goldstein as Scoop
- Don Harvey as Officer Preseuski
- Robert Swan as Mountie Captain
- Del Close as Alderman John O'Shea
- Kaitlin Montgomery as Ness' Daughter
- Larry Brandenburg and Chelcie Ross as Reporters
- Sam Smiley as Bailiff
- John Bracci as Fat Man
- Tony Mockus Sr. as Judge James Herbert Wilkerson
- Will Zahrn as Albert Fink, Capone's defense attorney
- Melody Rae as Union Station Woman
- Robert Miranda as Gunned Head

Uncredited

- Clifton James as District Attorney John A. Swanson
- John Barrowman as Street Person

== Background ==
=== Development ===
Ned Tanen spent years trying to obtain the rights to Eliot Ness' life story while working as an executive at Universal Pictures in the 1970s and the 1980s. After becoming head of motion picture productions at Paramount Pictures, which owned the film and television rights to Ness' memoir The Untouchables, Tanen immediately hired Art Linson to begin producing a film adaptation. Linson was not interested in adapting the ABC television series based on Ness's book, and sought to create a more "serious, authentic" depiction of Ness' career in Chicago. Linson hired playwright David Mamet to compose an original script for the film. Most of Mamet's screenplay was used, but director Brian De Palma slightly rewrote some scenes during production in order to incorporate new locations. For instance, the scene paying homage to the Potemkin Stairs from Battleship Potemkin (1925) was moved from a hospital to Chicago Union Station. A month after the film was released, De Palma downplayed his own role on the script:

Being a writer myself, I don't like to take credit for things I didn't do. I didn't develop this script. David [Mamet] used some of my ideas and he didn't use some of them. I looked upon it more clinically, as a piece of material that has to be shaped, with certain scenes here or there. But as for the moral dimension, that's more or less the conception of the script, and I just implemented it with my skills – which are well developed. It's good to walk in somebody else's shoes for a while. You get out of your own obsessions; you are in the service of somebody else's vision, and that's a great discipline for a director.

The character of the IRS agent Oscar Wallace was partially based on Frank J. Wilson, the IRS criminal investigator who spent years keeping tabs on Capone's financial dealings before laying charges. Unlike Wallace, Wilson was not killed during the investigation, and was later involved in the Lindbergh kidnapping case.

=== Casting ===
Linson and De Palma wanted to have a more tender portrayal of Ness than Robert Stack's "tough" portrayal from the 1950s television series, seeking to portray him as a "vulnerable family man". De Palma initially wanted Don Johnson to portray Eliot Ness. Mickey Rourke, Jeff Bridges, William Hurt, Harrison Ford and Michael Douglas also turned down the role. A 1985 issue of Variety announced the casting of Jack Nicholson as Ness, but he was ultimately replaced by Kevin Costner. In preparing for his role as Ness, Kevin Costner met with former FBI agent and Untouchable Al "Wallpaper" Wolff at his home in Lincolnwood for historical context and to learn about Ness' mannerisms.

Robert De Niro was De Palma's first choice to play Al Capone, but it was uncertain if he could appear in the film because of his appearance in the Broadway play Cuba and his Teddy Bear. He also wanted to gain about 30 pounds (14 kg) to play Capone; according to De Palma, De Niro was "very concerned about the shape of his face for the part." De Palma met with Bob Hoskins to discuss the role in case De Niro could not appear. When De Niro took the part, De Palma mailed Hoskins a check for £20,000 with a "Thank You" note, which prompted Hoskins to call up De Palma and ask him if there were any more films he didn't want him to be in. Gene Hackman and Marlon Brando were also considered as options in case both De Niro and Hoskins proved unable to perform the role. De Niro's research for the role of Capone included reading about him and watching historical footage. He had one extra scene written for his character, and contacted Capone's original tailors to have identical suits and silk underwear made for him. He was paid $2 million for the role.

Patricia Clarkson was cast to play Ness' wife, Catherine, in her debut film role. A young John Barrowman appears uncredited as a street person.

=== Filming ===
Principal photography began on August 18, 1986, in Chicago, Illinois, where Ness' story begins with him recruiting his Untouchables team with the intent of taking down Capone.

Filming locations included the Rookery Building (Ness' police headquarters), LaSalle Street, the DuSable Bridge, Chicago Cultural Center (the opera house, the courthouse lobby, and the rooftop chase), the Blackstone Hotel (the mob banquet), Our Lady of Sorrows Basilica (the church), and Chicago Union Station (the railway shootout). The Lexington Hotel, Capone's residence, had been closed since 1980, so the location was portrayed through three locations in the film: the exterior and lower lobby was filmed at Roosevelt University, while Capone's suite was the upper foyer of the Chicago Theatre. A West Side warehouse served as a soundstage.

In August 1986, Paramount Pictures contacted Garry Wunderwald of the Montana Film Commissioner's Office to find a 1930s-period bridge to portray a border crossing between the United States and Canada. Wunderwald suggested the Hardy Bridge, which crosses the Missouri River near the small town of Cascade, southwest of Great Falls.

From October 6–20, the bridge was closed to traffic to film the shootout sequence. 25 local residents were cast to ride horseback as Royal Canadian Mounted Police during the scene. The crew then built cabins and summer homes along the river, and 600 trees were brought in from Lincoln and Kalispell areas, and planted in a day and a half. Several 1920s and 1930s-era vehicles were rented from ranchers from Conrad and Great Falls. Actual filming took approximately 10 days, but the production staff reserved the bridge for enough time to allow for production delays. Hundreds were allowed to watch filming from a nearby field.

The railway station shoot-out is a homage to the Odessa Steps montage in Sergei Eisenstein's famous 1925 silent movie Battleship Potemkin, and it was parodied in the 1994 movie Naked Gun 33 1/3: The Final Insult as a dream sequence.

== Historical accuracy ==
While the film is based on historic events, most of the film is fictionalized or inaccurate. The raid at the Canada–United States border never happened, and neither did the courthouse or railway station shootouts. Ness did not kill Frank Nitti, who died in 1943, 12 years after the Capone trial, by suicide the day before Nitti himself was scheduled to be in court. In reality, Ness' unit had very little to do with Capone's final tax evasion conviction, which was orchestrated by U.S. Attorney George E. Q. Johnson and IRS Agent Frank J. Wilson, who inspired the character of Oscar Wallace (Charles Martin Smith) but was never part of the Untouchables.

The scene where Capone beats a lieutenant (John Bracci) to death with a baseball bat is based on an urban legend, albeit one that historians doubt actually happened: after discovering that John Scalise, Albert Anselmi and Joseph Guinta were planning to betray him, Capone reportedly invited the trio to a dinner party and beat them to death.

In the film, Ness' wife is called Catherine (Patricia Clarkson) and they have a young daughter (Kaitlin Montgomery). In real life, Ness's wife at the time was named Edna and the couple had no children, though Ness would later adopt a son, Robert.

== Reception ==
The Untouchables opened on June 3, 1987, in 1,012 theatres in the United States and Canada where it grossed $10,023,094 on its opening weekend and ranked the sixth-highest opening weekend of 1987. It went on to gross $76.2 million in the United States and Canada. According to producer Art Linson, the polls conducted for the film showed that approximately 50% of the audience were women. "Ordinarily, a violent film attracts predominantly men, but this is also touching, about redemption and relationships and because of that the audience tends to forgive the excesses when it comes to violence". Internationally, the film grossed $110.5 million, for a worldwide total of $186.7 million.

=== Critical response ===
The Untouchables received positive reviews from film critics. On Rotten Tomatoes, the film has an approval rating of 83% based on reviews from 75 critics, with an average rating of 7.60/10. The website's critical consensus reads, "Slick on the surface but loaded with artful touches, Brian DePalma's classical gangster thriller is a sharp look at period Chicago crime, featuring excellent performances from a top-notch cast." On Metacritic, the film has a weighted average score of 79 out of 100, based on 16 critics, indicating "generally favorable reviews". Audiences polled by CinemaScore gave the film an average grade of "A−" on an A+ to F scale.

Vincent Canby of The New York Times gave the film a positive review, calling it "a smashing work" and saying it was "vulgar, violent, funny and sometimes breathtakingly beautiful". Roger Ebert of the Chicago Sun-Times praised the film for its action sequences and locations, but disapproved of David Mamet's script and Brian De Palma's direction. Ebert singled out the film's depiction of Al Capone as arrogant and childish, to the point of misbehaving in public and in court, as the biggest disappointment of the film, while giving praise to Sean Connery's work. Hal Hinson, in his review for The Washington Post, also criticized De Palma's direction, saying "somehow we're put off here by the spectacular stuff he throws up onto the screen. De Palma's storytelling instincts have given way completely to his interest in film as a visual medium. His only real concern is his own style."

The New Yorker's Pauline Kael wrote that it was "not a great movie; it's too banal, too morally comfortable. The great gangster pictures don't make good and evil mutually exclusive, the way they are here [...] But it's a great audience movie—a wonderful potboiler." Richard Schickel of Time wrote, "Mamet's elegantly efficient script does not waste a word, and De Palma does not waste a shot. The result is a densely layered work moving with confident, compulsive energy". Time ranked it as one of the best films of 1987. Adrian Turner of Radio Times awarded it a full five stars, writing that "David Mamet's dialogue crackles, Ennio Morricone's music soars and the production design sparkles. Yet for many the main attraction of this modern classic is Sean Connery's Oscar-winning turn as the veteran Irish cop who shows Ness the ropes."

Despite receiving the Academy Award for Best Supporting Actor for his performance, Connery was voted first place in a 2003 Empire poll for worst film accent because his Scottish accent was still very noticeable.

=== Accolades ===
Award	Category	Subject	Result
Academy Awards	Best Supporting Actor	Sean Connery	Won
Academy Awards	Best Art Direction	Patrizia von Brandenstein, William A. Elliott and Hal Gausman	Nominated
Academy Awards	Best Costume Design	Marilyn Vance	Nominated
Academy Awards	Best Original Score	Ennio Morricone	Nominated
American Society of Cinematographers Awards	Outstanding Achievement in Cinematography in Theatrical Releases	Stephen H. Burum	Nominated
ASCAP Film and Television Music Awards	Top Box Office Films	Ennio Morricone	Won
Blue Ribbon Awards	Best Foreign Film	Brian De Palma	Won
British Academy Film Awards	Best Actor in a Supporting Role	Sean Connery	Nominated
British Academy Film Awards	Best Costume Design	Marilyn Vance	Nominated
British Academy Film Awards	Best Original Score	Ennio Morricone	Won
British Academy Film Awards	Best Production Design	Patrizia von Brandenstein, William A. Elliott and Hal Gausman	Nominated
César Awards	Best Foreign Film	Brian De Palma	Nominated
David di Donatello Awards	Best Foreign Film	Art Linson	Nominated
Golden Globe Awards	Best Supporting Actor – Motion Picture	Sean Connery	Won
Golden Globe Awards	Best Original Score	Ennio Morricone	Nominated
Grammy Awards	Best Album of Original Instrumental Background Score Written for a Motion Picture or Television	Ennio Morricone	Won
Japan Academy Film Prize	Outstanding Foreign Language Film		Nominated
Kansas City Film Critics Circle Awards	Best Supporting Actor	Sean Connery	Won
London Film Critics' Circle Awards	Actor of the Year	Sean Connery	Won
Los Angeles Film Critics Association Awards	Best Supporting Actor	Sean Connery	Runner-up
Nastro d'Argento	Best Score	Ennio Morricone	Won
National Board of Review Awards	Top Ten Films		4th Place
National Board of Review Awards	Best Supporting Actor	Sean Connery	Won
National Society of Film Critics Awards	Best Supporting Actor	Sean Connery	2nd Place
New York Film Critics Circle Awards	Best Supporting Actor	Sean Connery	Runner-up
Writers Guild of America Awards	Best Screenplay – Based on Material from Another Medium	David Mamet	Nominated

=== American Film Institute ===
- AFI's 100 Years...100 Movies – Nominated
- AFI's 100 Years...100 Thrills – Nominated
- AFI's 100 Years...100 Heroes and Villains:
  - Al Capone – Nominated Villain
  - Eliot Ness – Nominated Hero
- AFI's 100 Years of Film Scores – Nominated
- AFI's 10 Top 10 – Nominated (Gangster Film)

== Video game ==
A side-scrolling video game, The Untouchables, was released by Ocean Software in 1989 on multiple platforms. The game plays out some of the more significant parts of the film. Set in Chicago, the primary goal of the game is to take down Al Capone's henchmen and eventually detain Capone.

== Cancelled prequel ==
It was reported on July 2, 2004, that Antoine Fuqua would direct an Untouchables spinoff titled The Untouchables: Mother's Day, which was later changed to Capone Rising. The film's script, which was written by Brian Koppelman and David Levien, focused on the rise of Chicago mob kingpin Capone in the years before the encounter with Ness and his lawmen. In June 2005, original director Brian De Palma replaced Fuqua on the film. According to him, the project went into development several times with Nicolas Cage, Gerard Butler and Benicio del Toro all attached to play Capone at different stages.

In June 2006, original Untouchables composer Ennio Morricone told Variety that he had already turned down the offer to return to score the prequel because he didn't want to lose his inspiration by spending too much time in Hollywood. While promoting The Black Dahlia, on September 8, De Palma revealed in an interview for CHUD.com that his longtime writer-collaborator David Rabe was brought aboard the project to make revisions to the Koppelman/Levien draft. He added,

"There's an assassination in Tosca that I've always wanted to do that I wrote for another script, and I was able to get it into this script. It's an incredible set piece where they kill [James] Colosimo while he's watching Tosca, which is something I've wanted to do for years. So I've got a whole bunch of good ideas. And then we have this whole relationship between the young Sean Connery character and Al Capone with a girl in between them; I came up with this idea of a saloon singer. It's good."

On September 26, he confirmed during a separate interview for the fansite De Palma a la Mod that they were planning to shoot the prequel "late next summer" and that another project of his, Toyer, was postponed to accommodate that schedule.
