= The Scarface Mob =

- Directed by: Phil Karlson
- Written by: Paul Monash
- Based on: the book by Elliot Ness and Oscar Fraley
- Produced by: Quinn Martin
- Starring: Robert Stack
- Cinematography: Charles Straumer
- Edited by: Robert L. Swanson
- Music by: Wilbur Hatch
- Production company: Desilu Productions
- Release date: April 20, 1959
- Running time: 99 minutes
- Country: United States
- Language: English
- Budget: $400,000

The Scarface Mob is an American film noir crime film directed by Phil Karlson and starring Robert Stack. It consists of the pilot episodes for the TV series The Untouchables (1959) that originally screened as a two-part installment of Westinghouse Desilu Playhouse on April 20 and 27 1959. The episodes were cut together and released theatrically as a stand-alone feature outside America in 1959 and inside the US in 1962.

== Premise ==
In 1929 Chicago, Federal investigator Eliot Ness struggles to win the fight against Al Capone. He decides to form a special team of reliable, dedicated, honest law enforcement officers.

== Cast ==
- Robert Stack as Eliot Ness
- Keenan Wynn as Joe Fuselli
- Barbara Nichols as Brandy La France
- Patricia Crowley as Betty Anderson
- Neville Brand as Al Capone
- Bill Williams as Martin Flaherty
- Joe Mantell as George Ritchie
- Bruce Gordon as Frank Nitti
- Peter Leeds as Lamarr Kane
- Eddie Firestone as Eric Hansen
- Robert Osterloh as Tom Kopka
- Paul Dubov as Jack Rossman

== Production ==
There were a number of stories set in this area on film and TV at the time, including Seven Against the Wall on Playhouse 90 and the film Al Capone (1959).

Desi Arnaz optioned the rights to Eliot Ness' book about fighting Al Capone and decided to turn it into a two-part episode of Westinghouse Desilu Playhouse under the title of "The Untouchables". It was always intended to be released theatrically in Europe. Westinghouse paid $200,000 for the episodes but they cost $400,000. Arnaz was willing to risk the short fall in order to get greater production values and highly regarded cast like Robert Stack and Neville Brand.

Stack says the lead role was first offered to Van Heflin who turned it down, then Van Johnson who accepted but his wife advised him not to do it. Then Stack was offered; he was reluctant but his agent persuaded him to do it - he says his costumes were fitted for Van Johnson.

Stack later wrote that Phil Karlson was "ideally suited" to direct the show because "he can deal in violence and brutality on the screen, and some of his work was regarded as the precursor of Sam Peckinpah's. But he's a quiet, gentle man who wears a ratty-looking red sweater which he thinks brings him luck... His personal, Joe Milquetoast manner contrasted sharply with the controlled mayhem of his product."

Stack said Brand, a real life war hero, was "schooled in violence and perfect as Capone... even though his Italian accent left something to be desired." Stack says he based his performance on Ness on a "composite of three of the bravest men I ever met": Audie Murphy; Buck Mazza, Stack's former roommate in the navy and a war hero; and a stuntman named Carey Loftin. "All three had one thing in common," wrote Stack, "they were the best in their fields and they never boasted!" Although Stack considered himself as a character actor more than a leading man, he deliberately decided to downplay Ness against the flashiness of the villains.

The network wanted someone different from Walter Winchell to do the narration but Desi Arnaz insisted on the columnist because "he was the period."

== Reception ==
=== Critical ===
Reviewing part one, the New York Times said "while it was not superlative drama or a novel theme, it held the interest. Whether it will be worth two chapters remains to be seen."

The Los Angeles Times called it "a harsh and ugly slab of violence, expertly done with the true metal of history."

The New York Times, reviewing part two, praised the quality of the production design.

=== Ratings ===
According to Stack the show earned a 36.1 rating.

Four days after the series aired, the ABC network offered Desilu $3,620,000 to make 32 episodes of a series about The Untouchables. ABC held 35%, Desilu 35% and the rest was held by Stack and other outside interests.

== Alcatraz Express ==
Neville Brand later reprised his role as Capone in "The Big Train" a two part episode of The Untouchables.

The two episodes were cut together and released theatrically as Alcatraz Express.

=== Plot ===
Al Capone is about to be sent to prison in Atlanta on a tax-evasion charge. Elliot Ness insists that Capone be taken by train to San Francisco. Capone tries to escape while on board.

=== Reception ===
Reviewing the original episodes, the Los Angeles Times called it "about the slickest two hours of warfare ever shown on the tube."

== The Gun of Zangara ==
The Unhired Assassin was another two-part episode of The Untouchables that was released theatrically, this time under the title The Gun of Zangara. It focused on Giuseppe Zangara's attempted assassination of Franklin D. Roosevelt.

The project was a labor of love for writer William Spier.

== Notes ==
- Stack, Robert; Evans, Mark (1980). Straight shooting. Macmillan.
