= Secret Six (disambiguation) =

Secret Six may refer to:

- Secret Six, a group of six men who secretly funded American abolitionist John Brown
- Secret Six (Chicago), a group of six men who organized the Chicago business community against gangster Al Capone
- Secret Six (comics), various fictional teams in the DC Comics Universe
- The Secret Six, 1931 film.
- The Secret 6 was the title of four hero pulps written by Robert J. Hogan and published by "Popular Publications" about a secret group of mystery crime fighters. The title ran from October 1934 to January 1935, inclusive.
