= Alexander Jamie =

FBI agent

Alexander Jamie was an American federal agent of the Bureau of Investigation (which became the Federal Bureau of Investigation in 1935) and eventually became the head of the Chicago field office. In 1928, he transferred to the Bureau of Prohibition becoming the Chief Investigator with the Chicago office of that Bureau. At the same time he was also working as the Chief Criminal Investigator for The Secret Six, a group of businessmen banded together to fight organized crime in Chicago. Alexander was the brother-in-law to Eliot Ness, who worked under him in the Prohibition Bureau, and who formed and led a famous team of Prohibition Agents, dubbed "The Untouchables" by the media, known for their efforts in bringing down Al Capone.
