= Hoffa: The Real Story =

1975 autobiography by Jimmy Hoffa

- First edition
- Author: Jimmy Hoffa and Oscar Fraley
- Language: English
- Genre: Autobiography
- Published: 1975
- Publisher: Stein & Day
- Publication place: United States
- Pages: 224

Hoffa: The Real Story is an autobiography by Jimmy Hoffa and Oscar Fraley published in 1975 by Stein & Day. The book was released after Hoffa had disappeared and was presumed dead. It was marketed as a story by Hoffa "as told to" to Fraley.

The book was originally intended for release in February 1976, but the date was pushed forward after Hoffa's disappearance. It was part of a media strategy of Hoffa's, planned to take place before the 1976 Teamsters convention.

In 2019, the book was rereleased by Graymalkin Media.

Hoffa had published an earlier autobiography titled The Trials of Jimmy Hoffa (1970).
