= William A. Elliott =

American art director

- Occupation: Art director
- Years active: 1984 - present
- Children: Tyler Elliott

William A. Elliott is an American art director. He was nominated for an Academy Award in the category Best Art Direction for the film The Untouchables.

== Selected filmography ==
- The Untouchables (1987)
