= The Untouchables (video game) =

1989 video game

- Developers: Ocean Software; Special FX Software (NES)
- Publisher: Ocean Software
- Composer: Keith Tinman
- Platforms: Amstrad CPC, Commodore 64, ZX Spectrum, MS-DOS, MSX, Atari ST, Amiga, NES, Super NES
- Release: 1989 C64, CPC, MS-DOS, MSX, Spectrum, ST; 1990: Amiga; 1991: NES; 1994: SNES
- Genre: Action

The Untouchables is an action video game released by Ocean Software in 1989 on ZX Spectrum, Amstrad CPC, Commodore 64, MSX, Atari ST, Amiga, MS-DOS, Nintendo Entertainment System, and Super NES. It is based on the 1987 film The Untouchables.

== Gameplay ==
A side-scrolling based loosely on the movie, the game plays out some of the more significant parts of the film. Set in Chicago, the primary goal of the game is to take down Al Capone's henchmen and eventually detain Capone.

== Reception ==
Reception

Review scores
Publication	Score
Crash	94%
Computer and Video Games	85%
Electronic Gaming Monthly	5.8/10 (SNES)
Sinclair User	95%
Your Sinclair	94%
Zzap!64	96%
The Games Machine	96%

Awards
Publication	Award
Zzap!64	Gold Medal
Crash	Crash Smash
Your Sinclair	Megagame
Amstrad Action	Mastergame

Electronic Gaming Monthly gave the Super NES version a 5.8 out of 10, commenting that "This title would have been better if it were Super Scope compatible, for it is a bit difficult to use the pad during the shooting sequences."

The reviewer from Crash called the game "Great stuff. Ocean have brought Chicago to life. Atmospheric title tune (128k), beautifully detailed graphics and challenging gameplay add up to one addictive mean game!"

Sinclair User commented that "The Untouchables is a cracking conversion. Easily one of the most successful and accurate movie licenses to date."

Paul Rand of Computer and Video Games stated that "The Untouchables is a well thought out package which will find a niche in most people's software collections [...] those who buy it won't be disappointed."

The Games Machine added that "The six levels are all trigger-pumping fun, with suitable graphics to give an authentic Twenties feel, and some nice touches [...] It all make The Untouchables a winner."
