= The Untouchables (book) =

Memoir by Eliot Ness and Oscar Fraley

- First edition cover
- Author: Eliot Ness; Oscar Fraley
- Language: English
- Publisher: Julian Messner
- Publication date: 1957
- Publication place: United States
- Media type: Print (hardback and paperback)
- Pages: 336
- OCLC: 1278969
- Dewey Decimal: 364.9773
- LC Class: HV6795.C4 N4

The Untouchables is an autobiographical memoir by Eliot Ness co-written with Oscar Fraley, published in 1957. The book deals with the experiences of Ness, who was a federal agent in the Bureau of Prohibition, as he fought crime in Chicago in the late 1920s and early 1930s with the help of a special team of agents handpicked for their incorruptibility, nicknamed The Untouchables.

The main part of the book is written in first-person anecdotal style, as if directly from Ness's reminiscences; a foreword and afterword by Fraley provide historical context. In fact, Fraley, who was a prominent sportswriter for United Press when he worked on the book, did most of the writing, although Ness wrote a lengthy synopsis that Fraley used as a starting point, made himself available for interviews, made his scrapbooks and other memorabilia available for research purposes, and approved the final version of the text shortly before his death.

The book inspired The Untouchables, a popular television series which ran from 1959 to 1963 (including the theatrically released film The Scarface Mob), and the 1987 film The Untouchables.

== Reception ==
Although The Untouchables has been criticized for its lack of historical accuracy, later research casts doubt on these claims. Ness biographers Max Allan Collins and A. Brad Schwartz, after comparing Ness and Fraley's account to contemporary primary source evidence, concluded that the book is broadly accurate but includes some false details and is not in the correct chronological order.

In an article for Vanity Fair, the writer Matthew Pearl, citing "up-to-date Untouchables scholarship," observed that Ness and Fraley, "by and large, appear to be telling the truth."
