= Untouchables (law enforcement) =

American anti-alcohol trafficking agents

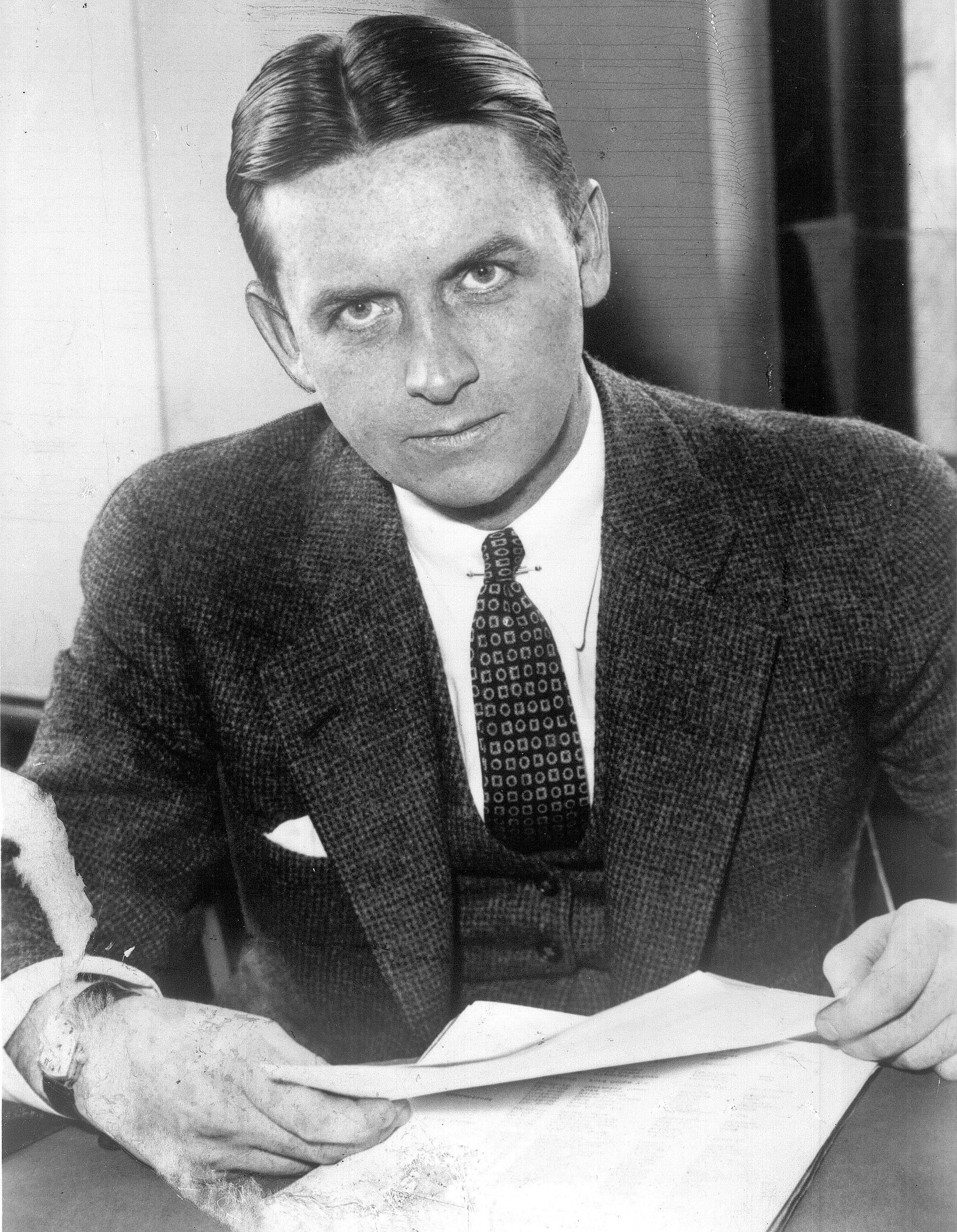
Eliot Ness around 1933

The Untouchables were special agents, also known as "dry agents," of the U.S. Bureau of Prohibition led by Eliot Ness, who, from 1930 to 1932, worked to end Al Capone's illegal activities by aggressively enforcing Prohibition laws against his organization. Legendary for being fearless and incorruptible, they earned the nickname "The Untouchables" after several agents refused large bribes from members of the Chicago Outfit.

The unit has had a lasting impact on the techniques and methods of modern organized crime law enforcement units.

== History ==
Shortly after taking office in 1929, Herbert Hoover, the 31st president of the United States, gave Secretary of the Treasury Andrew Mellon and Attorney General William D. Mitchell a plan for attacking large bootlegging gangs with small teams of Prohibition agents working under special United States attorneys. Neither Mellon nor Mitchell moved to implement Hoover's plan until attorney Frank J. Loesch of the Chicago Crime Commission approached the president in March 1930, asking his help in bringing down Al Capone. Hoover, facing the political fallout of the Wall Street Crash of 1929, instructed his administration to make the Capone case a priority.

At that time, Capone was already under investigation by agents from the Treasury's Bureau of Internal Revenue. In 1929, an investigation led by U.S. attorney George E. Q. Johnson into a Chicago Heights bootlegging gang allied with the Capone mob had uncovered financial records suggesting members of the Chicago Outfit could be found guilty of evading federal income tax. Agents of the Treasury Department's Intelligence Unit, serving under Elmer Irey, used this evidence to convict Capone's brother Ralph of tax fraud in April 1930, but they lacked sufficient evidence to charge Capone when Loesch met with Hoover. In June 1930, Special Agent Frank J. Wilson was placed in charge of this investigation.

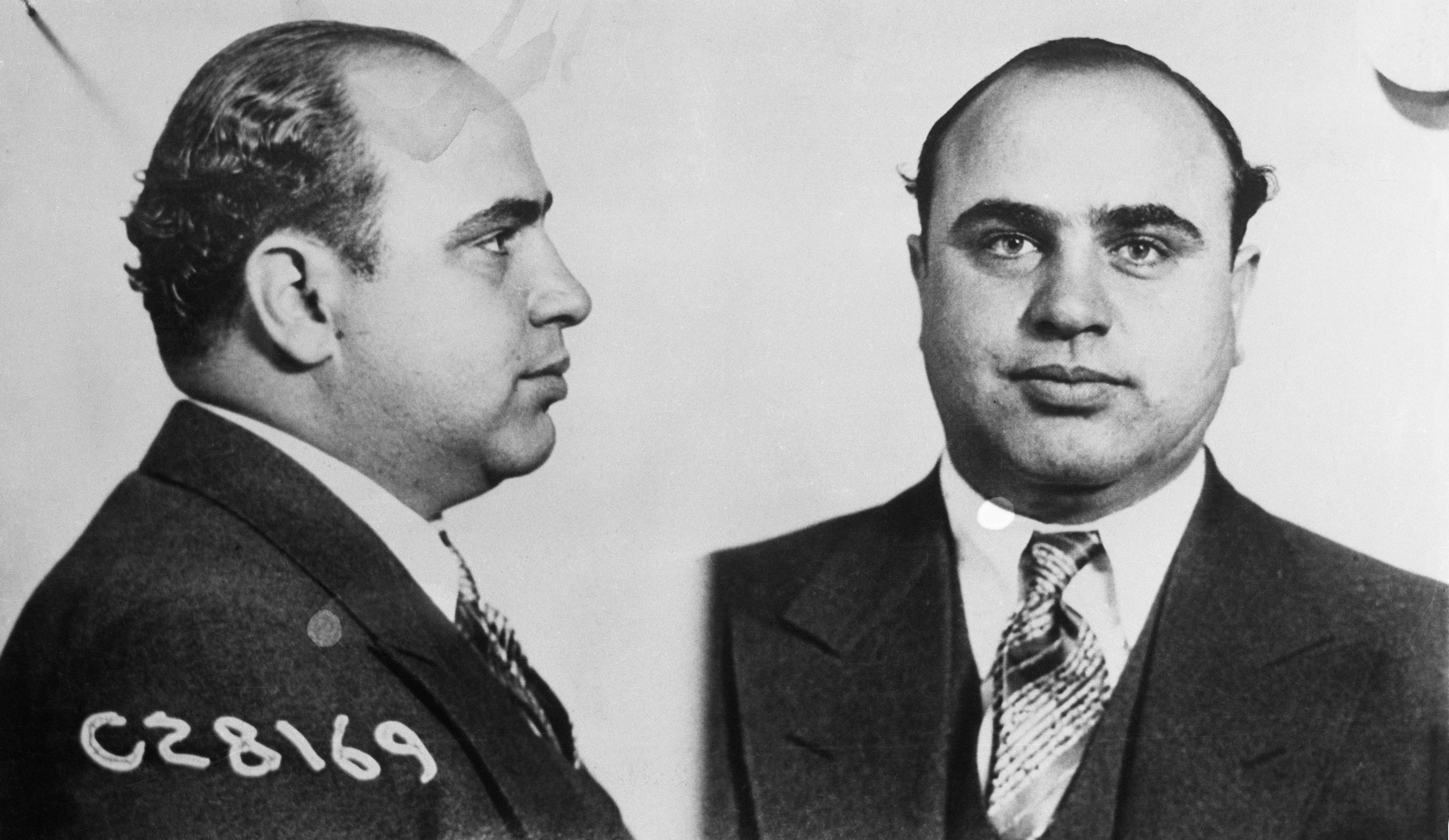
Mugshot of Al Capone

In late 1930, Attorney General Mitchell, impatient with Johnson's lack of progress on the Capone case, decided to implement President Hoover's idea for sending a small squad of Prohibition agents to break up the Capone gang. Johnson selected twenty-seven-year-old Eliot Ness, a special agent with the Prohibition Bureau who had played key roles on the Chicago Heights case and an investigation into Ralph Capone's bootlegging operations, to head this elite squad.

Malachi Harney was the director of the BOI's Northwest District, including all of Minnesota, North and South Dakota, Iowa and Nebraska. Harney oversaw the operations of Eliot Ness and the other Untouchables and Dry Agents at Treasury out of the Chicago Prohibition Office.

Operating out of Room 308 of the Transportation Building at 608 S. Dearborn Street, in what is now Chicago's Printer's Row neighborhood, the Untouchables planned their activities to stop Capone. Ness was ordered to lead raids against the Outfit's illegal breweries and distilleries, depriving Capone of the income he needed to pay the corrupting graft that was his greatest protection against prosecution, while also gathering evidence that could be used to prosecute Capone and his associates for conspiracy to violate the Volstead Act. Ness selected several agents, most from outside Chicago, whom he believed to be trustworthy, before beginning an extensive wire-tapping operation to gather information for the raids.

The squad located several Capone breweries and distilleries in and around Chicago and began raiding them in March 1931. Within six months, Ness's agents had destroyed bootlegging operations worth an estimated $500,000 (the equivalent of $10.3 million in 2024 dollars) and representing an additional $2 million in lost income for Capone (equivalent to around $41 million in 2024). Their efforts reportedly inflicted significant financial damage on Capone and his organization while Frank Wilson and the Intelligence Unit worked to build their tax evasion case.

Failed attempts by members of the Capone mob to bribe or intimidate Ness and his agents inspired Charles Schwarz of the Chicago Daily News to begin calling them "untouchables," a term Schwarz borrowed from newspaper stories about the untouchables of India. George Johnson adopted the nickname and promoted it to the press, establishing it as the squad's unofficial title.

In June 1931, Capone was indicted first for income tax evasion and then for five thousand counts of conspiracy to violate the Volstead Act, the latter based on evidence gathered by Ness and his Untouchables. Capone pled guilty to all charges after George Johnson agreed to recommend a 2 1/2-year sentence. But federal judge James H. Wilkerson refused to accept Johnson's agreement and, once Capone changed his pleas, brought the tax case to trial. Although Capone would never be prosecuted on the Prohibition charges, that indictment formed the basis of a tax suit brought by the federal government following Capone's conviction for income tax evasion.

Ness and the Untouchables continued to attack the Outfit's beer and liquor empire during and after Capone's trial, their efforts resulting in estimated lost income in excess of $9 million. In recognition of this work, Ness was promoted to Chief Investigator of the Prohibition Bureau for Chicago in 1932. By that point, the Untouchables had essentially been disbanded, though Ness would continue to lead raids against Outfit breweries and distilleries until the repeal of Prohibition in 1933.

== Members ==
Because corruption was endemic among law-enforcement officials, Ness searched records of all Prohibition agents to create a reliable team. The initial group, aside from Ness himself, numbered six. Over the course of the investigation, some agents left the squad for various reasons, while others were brought on as manpower shortages within the Prohibition Bureau allowed.

=== The primary ten ===
In June 1931, after Capone pleaded guilty to conspiracy to violate the National Prohibition Act, the Prohibition Bureau credited ten agents with building the case against him. These may be considered the core members of the Untouchables:

- Eliot Ness
- Joseph D. Leeson, an expert driver with the specialty of tailing.
- Lyle B. Chapman, a former Colgate University football player and investigator.
- Samuel Maurice Seager, a former Sing Sing death row corrections officer.
- Warren E. Stutzman, an ex-Pennsylvania police officer.
- Paul W. Robsky, a pilot and daring raider from South Carolina. (He later collaborated with Oscar Fraley, as Ness had on The Untouchables before him, on The Last of the Untouchables, a heavily fictionalized account of the Capone investigation.)
- Martin J. Lahart, a close friend of Ness's from Chicago, who had worked with him on previous investigations.
- Bernard V. "Barney" Cloonan, a muscular Irish agent known for his strength and investigative experience.
- Robert D. Sterling, a longtime Prohibition agent and the eldest of the core ten, who only served on the team for three weeks.
- Marion A.R. King, a talented undercover agent and the youngest member of the squad.

=== Other members ===
Other agents known to have served with the squad, but who were not named among its primary members, include:

- Carl Hambach, the last "Untouchable" prohibition agent to retire. A 38 year veteran who gained the nickname "Mr Alcohol Tax", and was the agent who put Capone onboard the train to Alcatraz Island.
- Don L. Kooken, described by Ness as "a former trapper and expert shot". His obituary described him as "the last surviving member of the T-Men Untouchables".
- William J. Gardner, Native American former athlete and football star at the Carlisle Indian School who was named by Knute Rockne to his personal All-Time All-America Team. A former soldier and lawyer, Gardner was among the first agents Ness selected for the team, but he soon left the squad for personal reasons.
- Ulric H. Berard, another member of the initial six who only served with the team for a brief period.
- E. A. Moore, a member of the initial six but not a full agent, who left after apparently failing to qualify for civil service.
- Thomas J. Friel, a former Pennsylvania state trooper.
- Al "Wallpaper" Wolff, a Chicago Prohibition agent who served under Ness after the St.Valentines Day Massacre & was one of the youngest members in the Untouchables. Al was the last living untouchable and died in 1998.

=== Disputed members ===
Given the Untouchables' enduring fame, other names have often been attached to the squad in error. These include:

- Frank Basile, a former bootlegger who served as Ness's informant and driver after being arrested for bribery. Although Basile assisted Ness during an earlier investigation of a Capone-connected mob in Chicago Heights, he was murdered in December 1928, before the Untouchables were formed.
- Jim Seeley, a former private investigator once mentioned by Ness as a participant in the investigation, though no contemporary evidence establishing his existence is known to exist.
- George Steelman and Arnold Grant, mentioned in Oscar Fraley and Paul Robsky's book The Last of the Untouchables as members of the squad who were dismissed for accepting bribes. Ness biographers Max Allan Collins and A. Brad Schwartz identify these as fictional characters possibly inspired by Bernard Cloonan, who was also suspected of corruption.

== See also ==
- The Untouchables (1957 book)
- The Untouchables (1959 TV series)
- The Untouchables (1987 film)
- The Untouchables (1993 TV series)
