= Eliot Ness =

American Prohibition agent (1903–1957)

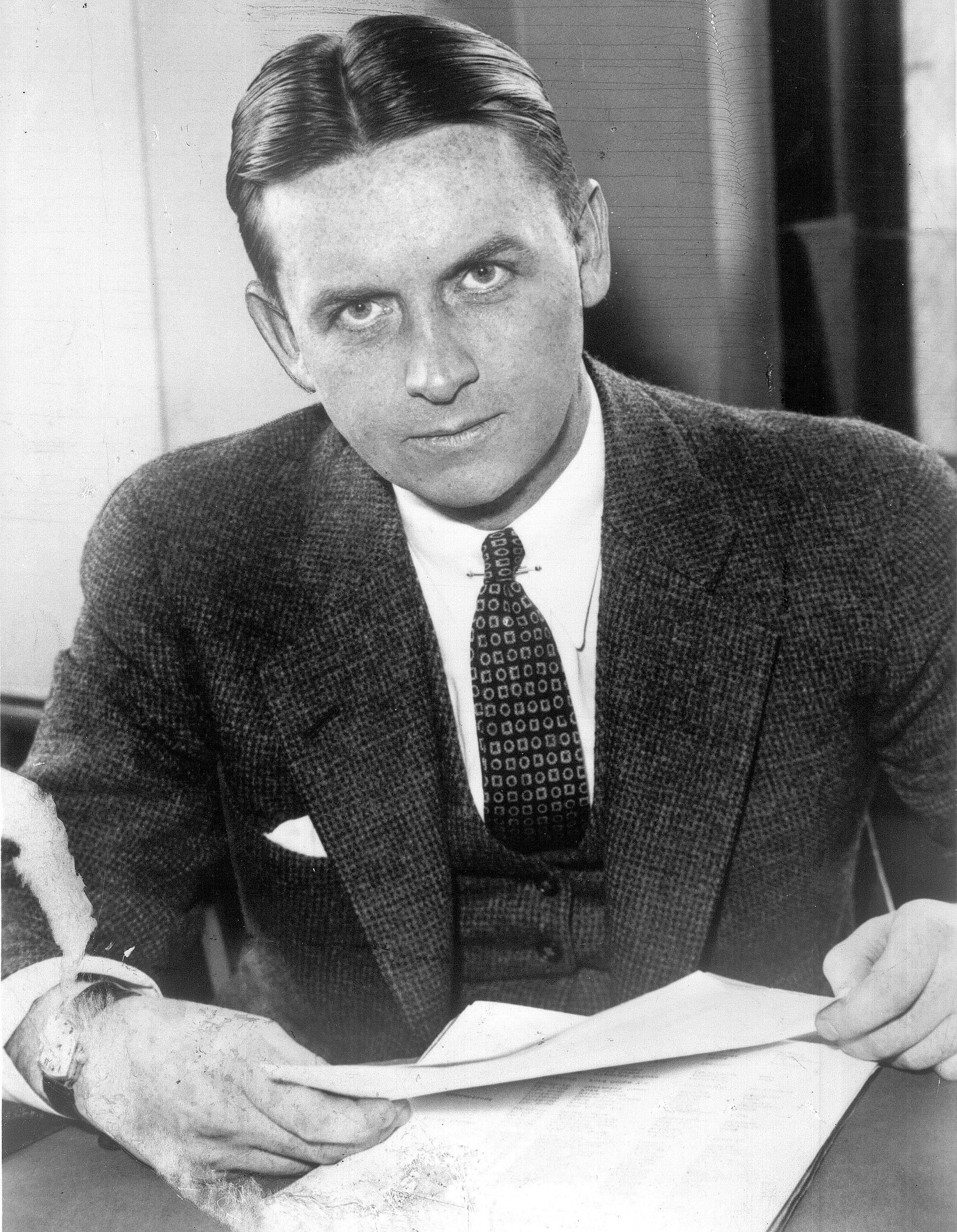
- Ness, c. 1933
- Born: April 19, 1903; Chicago, Illinois, U.S.
- Died: May 16, 1957 (aged 54); Coudersport, Pennsylvania, U.S.
- Education: University of Chicago
- Spouses: Edna Stahle (m. 1929; div. 1938) Evaline Michelow (m. 1939; div. 1945) Elisabeth Andersen Seaver (m. 1946)
- Police career
- Department: Bureau of Prohibition; Cleveland Division of Police
- Service years: BOP: 1926–1935; CDP: 1935–1942
- Rank: Chief Investigator of the Prohibition Bureau for Chicago in 1934; Director for Public Safety for Cleveland, Ohio

Eliot Ness (April 19, 1903 – May 16, 1957) was an American Prohibition agent known for his efforts to bring down Al Capone while enforcing Prohibition in Chicago. He was leader of a team of law enforcement agents nicknamed The Untouchables, handpicked for their incorruptibility. The release of his memoir The Untouchables, months after his death, launched several screen portrayals establishing a posthumous fame for Ness as an incorruptible crime fighter.

== Early life ==
Eliot Ness was born on April 19, 1903, in the Roseland neighborhood of Chicago, Illinois. He was the youngest of five children born to Peter Ness (1850–1931) and Emma King (1863–1937). His parents, both Norwegian immigrants, operated a bakery. Ness attended Christian Fenger High School in Chicago. He was educated at the University of Chicago, graduating in 1925 with a degree in political science and business administration, and was a member of Sigma Alpha Epsilon. He began his career as an investigator for the Retail Credit Company of Atlanta assigned to the Chicago territory, where he conducted background investigations for the purpose of credit information. In 1929, he returned to the university to take a graduate course in criminology taught by August Vollmer, a noted police reformer and chief of the Berkeley Police Department. Vollmer's ideas about professionalizing law enforcement influenced Ness throughout his career.

== Career ==
=== 1926–1931 ===
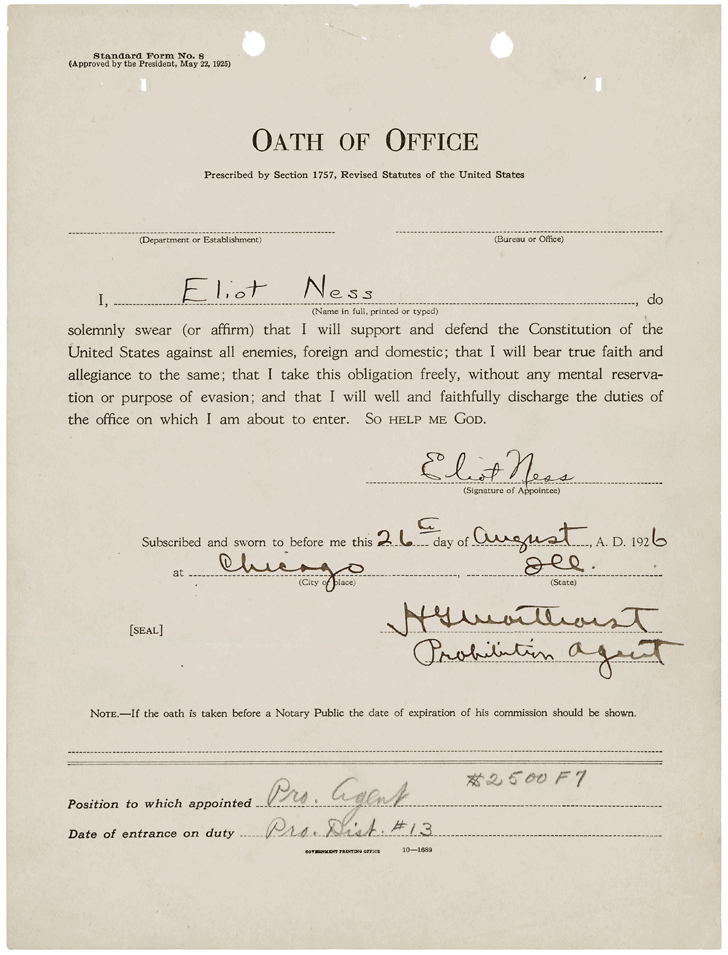
Oath of office of Ness as a Prohibition agent, dated 1926

Ness' brother-in-law, Alexander Jamie, an agent of the Bureau of Investigation (which became the Federal Bureau of Investigation in 1935), influenced Ness to enter law enforcement. Ness joined the U.S. Treasury Department in 1926, working with the 1,000-strong Bureau of Prohibition in Chicago.

In March 1930, attorney Frank J. Loesch of the Chicago Crime Commission asked President Herbert Hoover to take down Al Capone. Agents of the Bureau of Internal Revenue, working under Elmer Irey and Special Agent Frank J. Wilson of the Intelligence Unit, were already investigating Capone and his associates for income tax evasion. In late 1930, Attorney General William D. Mitchell, seeking a faster end to the case, implemented a plan devised by President Hoover for sending a small team of Prohibition agents, working under a special United States attorney, to target the illegal breweries and supply routes of Capone while gathering evidence of conspiracy to violate the National Prohibition Act (informally known as the Volstead Act). U.S. attorney George E.Q. Johnson, the Chicago prosecutor directly in charge of both the Prohibition and income tax investigations of Capone, chose the 27-year-old Ness (now assigned to the Justice Department) to lead this small squad.

In The Untouchables, Ness claimed to have originated the idea for an incorruptible federal force, and gave substantial credit to the Secret Six for both the creation of the group and Ness' appointment to lead it.

In October 1930, Alexander Jamie was named chief investigator for the powerful Chicago-based vigilantes, and, according to Ness, both Jamie and Secret Six founder Col. Robert Isham Randolph spoke to Johnson to endorse Ness' idea.

“I understand you’re the one who came up with this plan for closing down Capone’s breweries, which has been brought to my attention by Robert Isham Randolph,” Ness quoted Johnson as saying. Johnson said he supported the idea, and then turned to who would lead it: “Frankly, I had several men in mind, but you were recommended highly to me by the Secret Six and also by your brother-in-law Alexander Jamie.”

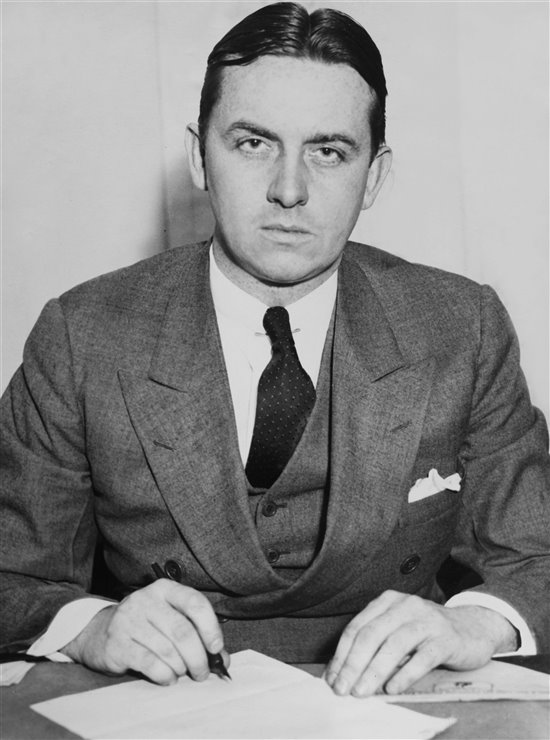
Ness in 1931

With corruption of Chicago's law enforcement agents endemic, Ness went through the records of all Prohibition agents to create a reliable team (initially of six, eventually growing to about ten) later known as "The Untouchables." Raids against illegal stills and breweries began in March 1931. Within six months, Ness' agents had destroyed bootlegging operations worth an estimated $500,000 (equivalent to almost $9.9 million in 2022) and representing an additional $2 million ($39.5 million in 2022) in lost income for Capone; their raids ultimately cost Capone in excess of $9 million ($178 million in 2022) in lost revenue. The main source of information for the raids was an extensive wiretapping operation.

In 1931, a member of Al Capone's gang promised Ness that he would receive $2,000 every week ($36,684 in 2022) if he ignored their bootlegging activities. Ness refused the bribe. Failed attempts by members of the Chicago Outfit to bribe or intimidate Ness and his agents inspired Charles Schwarz of the Chicago Daily News to begin calling them "untouchables". George Johnson adopted the nickname and promoted it to the press, establishing it as the squad's unofficial title.

The efforts of Ness and his team inflicted major financial damage on Capone's operations and led to his indictment on 5,000 violations of the Volstead Act in June 1931. Federal judge James H. Wilkerson prevented that indictment from coming to trial, instead pursuing the tax evasion case built by George Johnson and Frank Wilson. On October 17, 1931, Capone was convicted on three of 22 counts of tax evasion. He was sentenced to eleven years in prison and, following a failed appeal, began his sentence in 1932. On May 3, 1932, Ness was among the federal agents who took Capone from the Cook County Jail to Dearborn Station, where he boarded the Dixie Flyer to the Atlanta Federal Penitentiary—the only time the two men are known to have met in person.

=== 1932–1957 ===
In 1932, Ness was promoted to Chief Investigator of the Prohibition Bureau for Chicago. Following the end of Prohibition in 1933, he was assigned as an alcohol tax agent in the "Moonshine Mountains" of southern Ohio, Kentucky, and Tennessee, and in 1934 he was transferred to Cleveland, Ohio. In December 1935, Cleveland mayor Harold H. Burton hired Ness as the city's Safety Director, which put him in charge of both the police and fire departments. Ness soon began a reform program inspired by the ideas of August Vollmer, which focused on professionalizing and modernizing the police, stopping juvenile delinquency, and improving traffic safety. He declared war on the mob, and his primary targets included "Big" Angelo Lonardo, "Little" Angelo Scirrca, Moe Dalitz, John Angerola, George Angersola, and Charles Pollizi.

Ness was also Safety Director at the time of the murders known as the Cleveland Torso Murders, occurring in the Cleveland area from 1935 to 1938; though he had oversight of the police department, he was only peripherally involved in the investigation. Ness interrogated one of the prime suspects in the murders, Dr. Francis E. Sweeney, using a polygraph test. At one point, two bodies of the victims of the serial killer were placed within view of Ness' office window.

In 1938, Ness and his wife Edna divorced. The marriage failed because of Ness' steadfast dedication to duty, which kept him busy at all hours and away from home. His otherwise successful career in Cleveland withered gradually. He especially fell out of favor after he had the city's large shantytowns evacuated and burned during the Cleveland Torso Murders. Cleveland critics targeted his divorce, his high-profile social drinking, and his conduct in a car accident one night when he was driving drunk. Although there were no victims in the accident, Ness, fearful that he might lose his job, tried to get the accident covered up. Later, his involvement in the accident was revealed by a local newspaper and calls for his resignation increased; however, Burton's successor as mayor, Frank Lausche, kept Ness on.

In 1939, Ness married illustrator Evaline Michelow. In 1942, the Nesses moved to Washington, D.C., where he worked for the federal government. He directed the battle against prostitution in communities surrounding military bases, where venereal disease was a serious medical issue.

== Business ==
In the 1940s and 1950s, Eliot Ness was invited to participate in a number of ventures in the corporate world, most of which failed due to mismanagement by their promoters. "I don't hold it against Eliot or any of the others personally," recalled his closest friend and business associate Dan Moore. "I just never considered Eliot a very effective businessman, and he had a lot going on at the time. In fact, I'd have to say he was no businessman at all. He had no instinct for it and it was obvious to everyone except Eliot. He was pleasant and delightful, but too boyish, in a way, to be a good businessman."

In 1944, he became chairman of the Diebold Corporation, a security company based in Ohio, and instituted a reorganization that eliminated waste and expanded the product line.

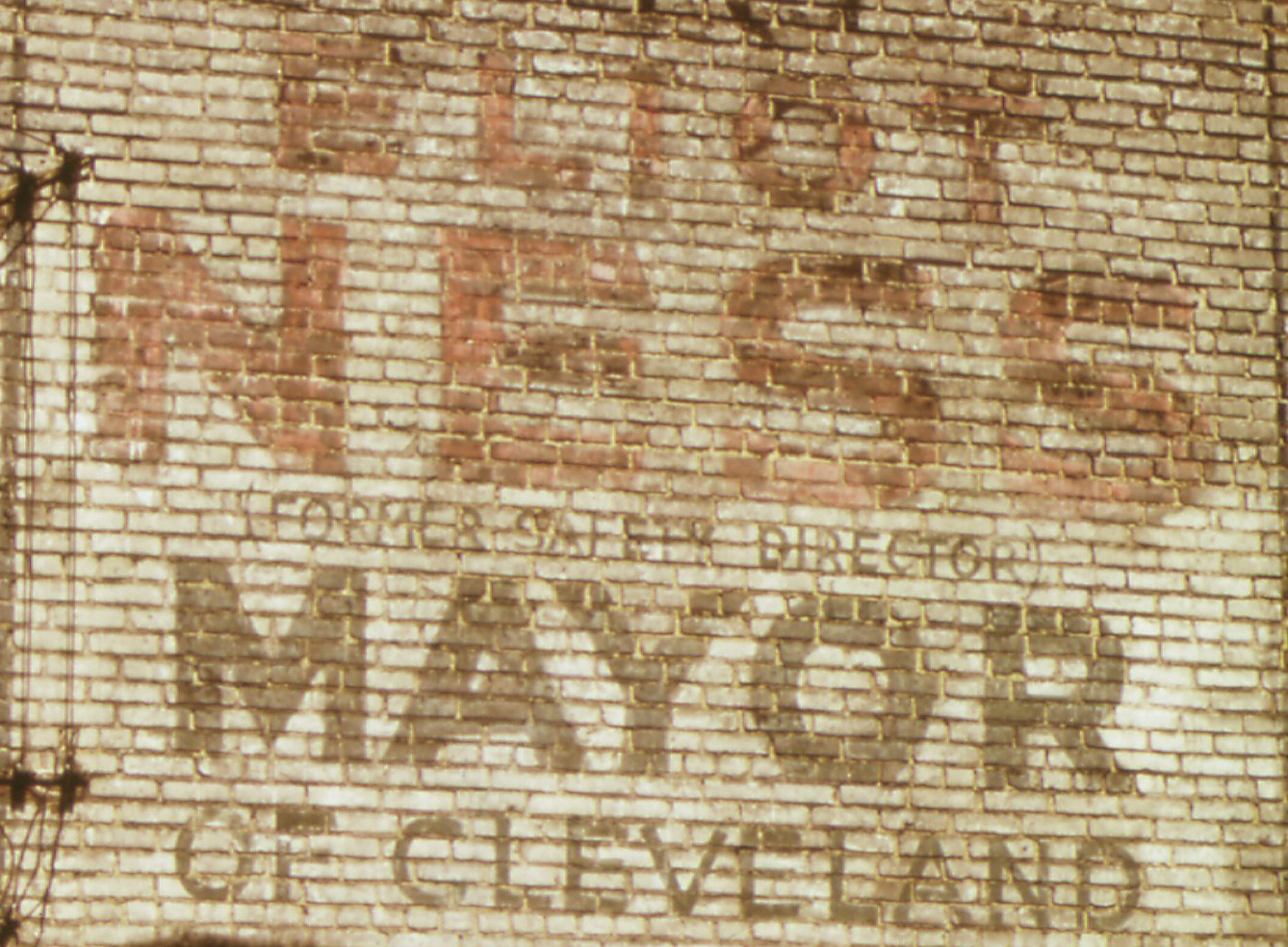
Ad from Ness' 1947 campaign for Mayor of Cleveland

Eliot Ness ran unsuccessfully for Mayor of Cleveland in 1947. He left Diebold in 1951.

In the aftermath, Ness tried to find a governmental position, but the new generation of politicians distanced themselves from the old-school Ness. Ness was forced into taking odd jobs to earn a living, including bookstore clerk and wholesaler of electronics parts and frozen hamburger patties. By 1956, he came to work for a startup company called Guaranty Paper Corporation, which claimed to have a new method of watermarking legal and official documents to prevent counterfeiting. Ness was offered the job because of his expertise in law enforcement, and moved from Cleveland to Coudersport, Pennsylvania, where much of the investment capital for the company was located. Now drinking more heavily, Ness spent his free time in a local bar, telling stories of his law enforcement career. Guaranty Paper began to fall apart when it became clear that one of Ness' business partners had misrepresented the nature of their supposedly proprietary watermarking process, leaving Ness in serious financial jeopardy.

In later years, Ness struggled financially; he was nearly penniless at the time of his death, with his role in bringing down Al Capone having been largely forgotten.

== Personal life ==
Ness was married to Edna Stahle (1900–1988) from 1929 to 1938 and illustrator Evaline Michelow (1911–1986) from 1939 to 1945. In 1946 he married artist Elisabeth Andersen Seaver (1906–1977); they remained married until his death in 1957. He also had an adopted son, Robert (1946–1976).

== Death ==
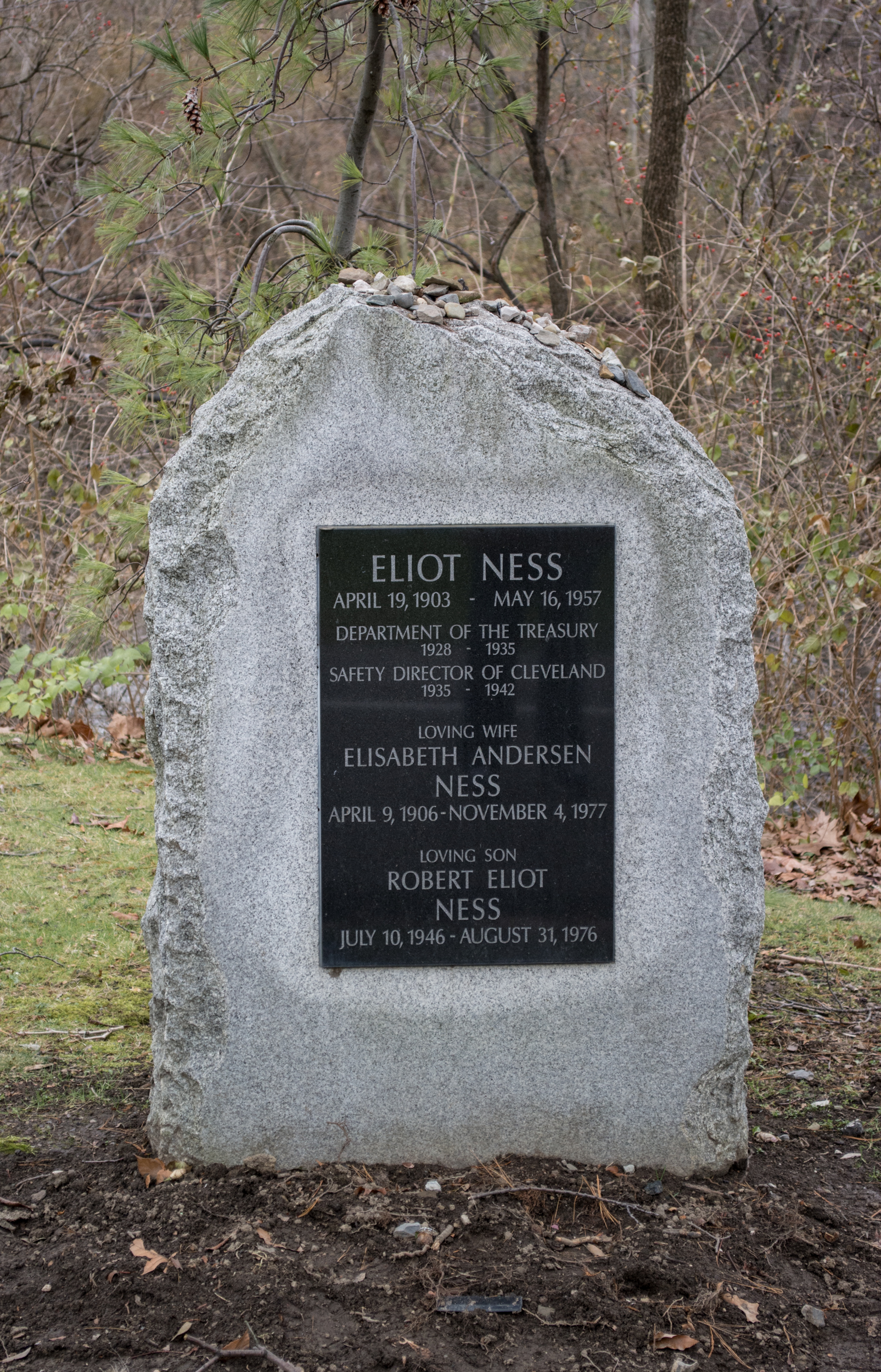
Ness' cenotaph located at Lake View Cemetery in Cleveland, Ohio

Shortly after his approval of the final galleys for The Untouchables, on whose writing he and Oscar Fraley had been collaborating as a means, on Ness' part, of earning money in his later years, Ness collapsed and died of a heart attack at his home in Coudersport, Pennsylvania, on May 16, 1957. He was 54 years of age. His body was cremated, and his ashes were scattered in one of the small ponds on the grounds of Lake View Cemetery in Cleveland. An admirer later donated a plot near the pond and erected a cenotaph in his honor there.

Ness was survived by his widow, Elisabeth Andersen Seaver, and adopted son, Robert.

== Legacy ==
=== Archive ===
The Western Reserve Historical Society houses additional Ness papers, including a scrapbook (1928–1936); copies of newspaper clippings (1935–1950); a typewritten manuscript detailing Ness' career in Chicago; and miscellaneous papers, including a report on the Fidelity Check Corporation and Guaranty Paper, of which Ness was president.

=== Art, entertainment, and media ===
Numerous media works have been developed based on Eliot Ness' life and the legend surrounding his work in Chicago. The first of these resulted in Ness' last years in collaboration with Oscar Fraley in writing the book The Untouchables (1957), which was published after Ness' death and went on to sell 1.5 million copies. Although the historical veracity of this book has been questioned, later research suggests that it is broadly accurate. A 21-page manuscript that Ness wrote for the book is housed in the archives of the Western Reserve Historical Society in Cleveland, Ohio.

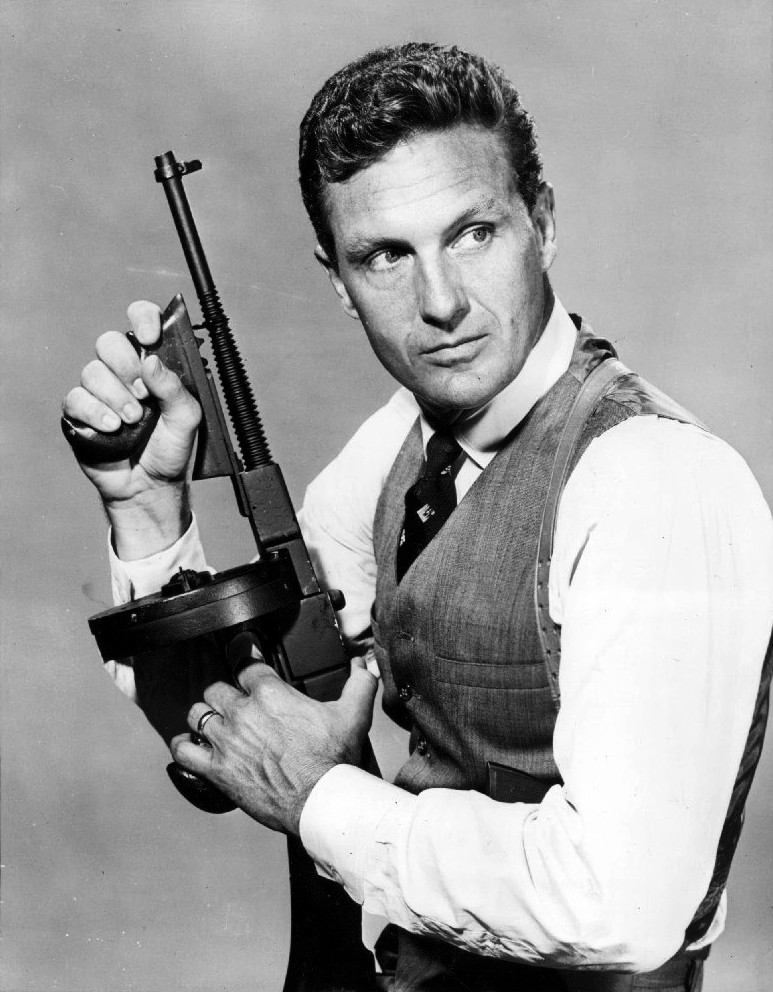
Actor Robert Stack portraying Ness in the series The Untouchables (1959)

The book was adapted in multiple media and inspired many additional works. The best-known adaptations include the 1959 TV series The Untouchables, which starred Robert Stack as Ness and was narrated by Walter Winchell, which itself was parodied by The Unmentionables, a 1963 Bugs Bunny cartoon where Bugs played "Elegant Mess"; and the 1987 film The Untouchables, directed by Brian De Palma, which starred Kevin Costner as Ness, Sean Connery, and Robert De Niro as Al Capone. These two fictionalized portrayals, more than actual history, have inspired numerous novels; a TV-movie, The Return of Eliot Ness, in which Stack returned to the role; a second, short-lived 1993 TV series titled The Untouchables, which starred Tom Amandes as Ness and William Forsythe as Capone; stage plays such as Peter Ullian's In the Shadow of the Terminal Tower; and comic books such as Torso. Ness was portrayed by actor Jim True-Frost in the fifth-season episode "The Good Listener" of the HBO television series Boardwalk Empire.

Max Allan Collins used Ness as the "police contact/best friend" character in his series of historical private eye novels featuring Chicago detective Nate Heller. Later he spun Ness off into his own series, set during his tenure as Cleveland's Public Safety Director. The first book, The Dark City (1987), depicted Ness' getting hired and undertaking a cleanup of the graft-ridden police force; the second, Butcher's Dozen (1988), his pursuit of the serial killer known as the Mad Butcher of Kingsbury Run. Bullet Proof (1989) pitted Ness against labor racketeers intent on taking over Cleveland's food service industry. Ness is mentioned in many hip hop and rap tracks ("California Love", for example). Murder by the Numbers (1993) depicted Ness' investigation of the numbers racket in Cleveland. All of these novels, while fictionalized, were closely based on actual cases investigated by Ness and the Cleveland Police. Collins also wrote a one-man stage play, Eliot Ness – An Untouchable Life, which was nominated for an Edgar Award. Collins wrote Ness into his graphic novel Road to Perdition.

In 2018, Collins collaborated with historian A. Brad Schwartz on a nonfiction dual biography of Ness and Capone entitled Scarface and the Untouchable: Al Capone, Eliot Ness, and the Battle for Chicago. Collins' and Schwartz's second volume about Ness' years in Cleveland, entitled Eliot Ness and the Mad Butcher, was published in 2020.

In The Young Indiana Jones Chronicles, Frederick Weller portrayed a young Elliot Ness in the eleventh episode The Mystery of the Blues. In the episode, he is portrayed as the roommate of Indiana Jones at the University of Chicago.

The video game called The Untouchables was released in 1989 by Ocean Software for ZX Spectrum, Amstrad CPC, Commodore 64, MSX, Atari ST, Amiga, MS-DOS, Nintendo Entertainment System, and Super NES.

Ness is mentioned by FBI agent Jimmy Woo as his idol growing up in "We Interrupt This Program" (release date: January 29, 2021), episode 4 of the Disney+ miniseries WandaVision.

Ness is a character in Supernatural in Season 7 Episode 12 "Time After Time" (release date: January 13. 2012). He was a hunter in 1944 and together with Dean Winchester he hunted down Chronos.

=== Beer ===
Cleveland-based Great Lakes Brewing Company, which claims several connections to Ness (including the brewery owners' mother having worked as his stenographer), named an amber lager "Eliot Ness" and included several subtle nods to his career in the beer description and label art.

=== Proposed building naming ===
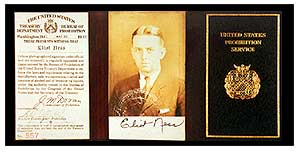
Ness' credentials as agent

On January 10, 2014, Illinois U.S. Senators Dick Durbin and Mark Kirk and Ohio Senator Sherrod Brown proposed naming the headquarters of the Bureau of Alcohol, Tobacco, Firearms and Explosives in Washington, D.C., after Ness. If approved, it would have been called the Eliot Ness ATF Building. Brown said in a statement: "Eliot Ness is perhaps best known as the man who helped to bring Al Capone to justice. But Eliot Ness was more than just a Chicago U.S. prohibition agent. He fought for law and justice in Ohio, and fought for peace and freedom in World War II. He was a public servant and an American hero who deserves to be remembered."

Chicago Aldermen Edward M. Burke (14th Ward) and James Balcer (11th Ward) introduced a resolution in the Chicago City Council to oppose the renaming. In a news release, Burke said: "Eliot Ness had a checkered career after leaving the federal government. I simply do not think his image matches the actual reality of his legacy."

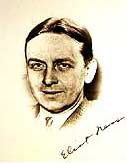
Illustration of Ness

The authors of two separate Ness biographies later disputed the accuracy of Burke's claims, suggesting he mischaracterized Ness' career. "If Hollywood has given Eliot Ness too much credit for getting Capone," Max Allan Collins wrote in an article for HuffPost, "he has received too little credit anywhere else for helping professionalize law enforcement in the mid-20th Century."

Although the Senate resolution was never adopted, the main atrium in the ATF headquarters building was later renamed for Eliot Ness and features a historical exhibit about the Untouchables.

=== Festival and museum ===
Coudersport, Pennsylvania, the town where Ness spent his final months and died, has held an annual "Eliot Ness Festival" every third weekend in July since 2018. Past events have included a public reunion of people descended from the original Untouchables, a dramatization of Al Capone's trial, film screenings, author talks, and antique car shows.

In 2019, an "Eliot Ness Museum" inspired by the annual festival opened in downtown Coudersport, featuring several antique cars and exhibits describing Ness' life and career.
