= Oscar Fraley =

American writer (1914–1994)

- Born: August 2, 1914; Philadelphia, Pennsylvania, U.S.
- Died: January 6, 1994 (aged 79); Fort Lauderdale, Florida, U.S.
- Occupation: Writer
- Children: Timothy Fraley (son)
- Writing career
- Notable work: The Untouchables

Oscar Fraley (August 2, 1914 – January 6, 1994) was an American sports writer and author, perhaps best known, with Eliot Ness, as the co-author of the American memoir The Untouchables.

== Early life ==
Born in Philadelphia, Pennsylvania, Fraley grew up across the Delaware River in Woodbury, New Jersey. He graduated from Woodbury Junior-Senior High School in 1934, and was inducted into the school's hall of fame in 2010.

== Career ==
Fraley worked for United Press International (UPI) as a sports reporter from 1940 to 1965. During his time at the UPI, he penned the Today's Sports Parade column which at its peak appeared in 450 newspapers nationwide. Over the course of his lifetime, Fraley penned 31 books, including Hoffa: The Real Story (Stein and Day, 1975).

== The Untouchables ==
In 1956, Fraley was introduced to Ness while working as a reporter for UPI. It was this encounter that served as the inspiration for The Untouchables (1957). By 1957, Fraley had written most of the proofs for the manuscript of the book. Ness read these proofs shortly before his own death that same year, and the book was released a month after Ness's death.

The Untouchables sold 1.5 million copies and served as the basis for the television series and movie of the same name. This book, among Fraley's other books about the Untouchables, was heavily spiced with fiction, including fictional characters and events in order to make the books more appealing to a general audience. The 21-page manuscript that Ness wrote for the book was a more trustworthy source and only included the real events that Ness experienced during his career. Ness's manuscript is housed in the archives of the Western Reserve Historical Society in Cleveland, Ohio.

The book was adapted in multiple media and inspired many additional works. The best-known eponymous adaptations include the 1959 TV series The Untouchables starring Robert Stack as Ness and narrated by Walter Winchell, the 1987 film The Untouchables by Brian De Palma starring Kevin Costner as Ness and featuring Sean Connery and Robert De Niro, and the short-lived 1993 TV series The Untouchables.

== Death ==
Oscar Fraley died on January 6, 1994, in Fort Lauderdale at Broward General Hospital. The cause was heart failure after surgery for a strangulated hernia.
