= James Herbert Wilkerson =

American judge (1869–1948)

Senior Judge of the United States District Court for the Northern District of Illinois
- In office December 31, 1940 – September 30, 1948

Judge of the United States District Court for the Northern District of Illinois
- In office July 18, 1922 – December 31, 1940
- Appointed by: Warren G. Harding
- Preceded by: Kenesaw Mountain Landis
- Succeeded by: Seat abolished

Personal details
- Born: James Herbert Wilkerson; December 11, 1869 Savannah, Missouri
- Died: September 30, 1948 (aged 78)
- Education: DePauw University (A.B.)

James Herbert Wilkerson (December 11, 1869 – September 30, 1948) was a United States district judge of the United States District Court for the Northern District of Illinois.

== Education and career ==
Born in Savannah, Missouri, Wilkerson received an Artium Baccalaureus degree from DePauw University in 1889. He was in private practice in Chicago, Illinois from 1893 to 1922. He was a member of the Illinois House of Representatives in 1902, and was a county attorney of Cook County, Illinois from 1903 to 1904. He was a special assistant to the Attorney General of the United States from 1906 to 1911, and was then the United States Attorney for the Northern District of Illinois from 1911 to 1914. He was Chairman of the Illinois Public Utilities Commission from 1919 to 1921.

== Federal judicial service ==
On July 11, 1922, Wilkerson was nominated by President Warren G. Harding to a seat on the United States District Court for the Northern District of Illinois vacated by Judge Kenesaw Mountain Landis. Wilkerson was confirmed by the United States Senate on July 18, 1922, and received his commission the same day. He assumed senior status on December 31, 1940, serving in that capacity until his death on September 30, 1948.

=== Capone sentencing ===
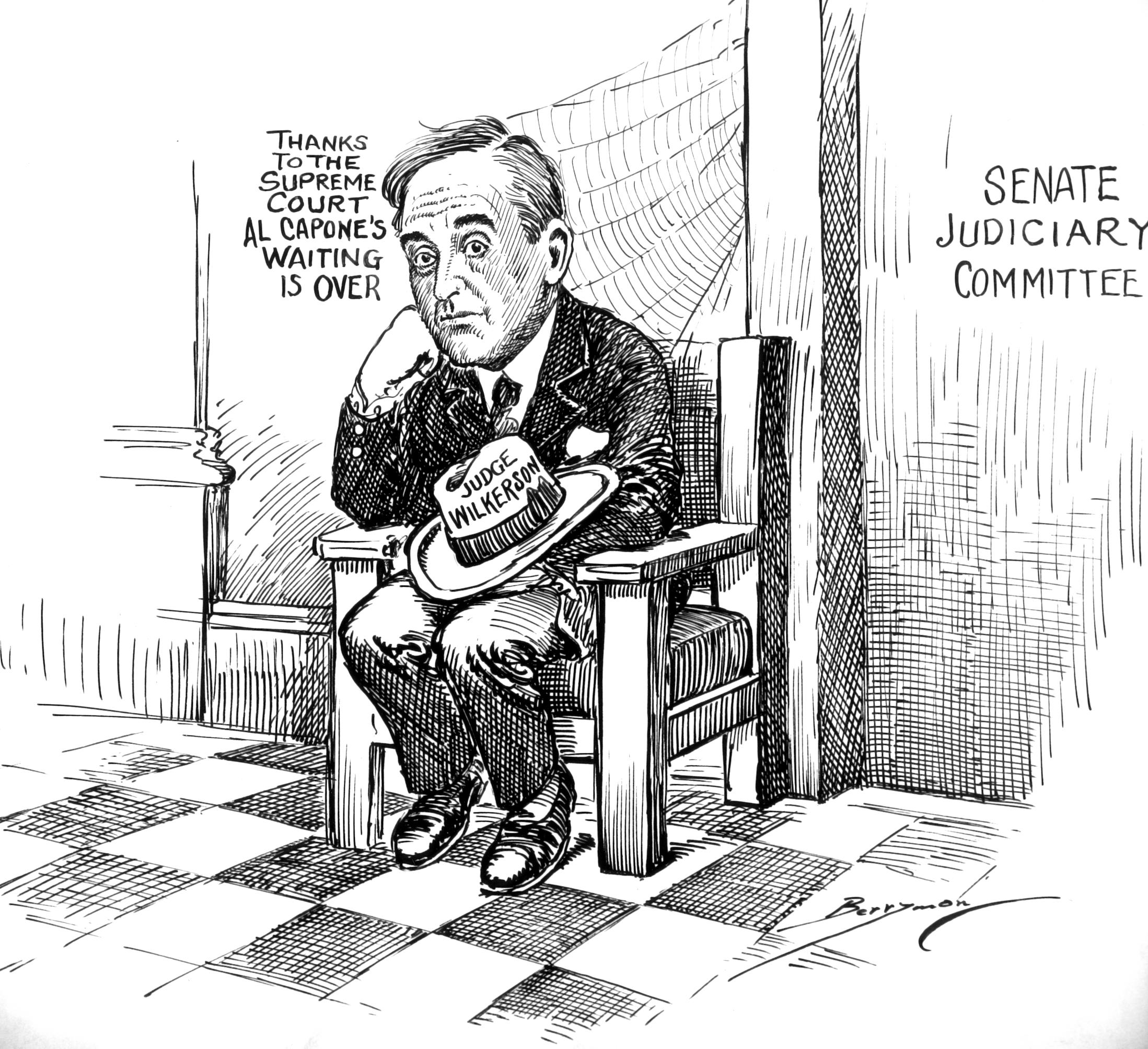
1932 cartoon by Clifford K. Berryman

On November 24, 1931, Wilkerson sentenced Al Capone to 11 years in prison for tax evasion. Capone would often engage in jury tampering, and about two weeks before the scheduled start of the trial, informant Edward J. O'Hare told IRS agent Frank J. Wilson that Capone's outfit had a complete list of prospective jurors. Ten of the jurors' names and addresses O'Hare provided appeared on the jury list. When they relayed it to Wilkerson, he responded that he hadn't received his jury list yet, but would call them when he did. The names on O'Hare's list matched exactly the names on Wilkerson's list, but Wilkerson seemed to be unconcerned, telling them to bring the case into court as planned and to "leave the rest to him". Just before the trial opened on October 5, he had the bailiff switch out the entire jury panel with Judge Edwards' panel. The new jury had also been sequestered overnight to further avoid tampering.

== Sources ==
Legal offices
Preceded by Kenesaw Mountain Landis	Judge of the United States District Court for the Northern District of Illinois; 1922–1940	Succeeded by Seat abolished
