= J5 =

J5, J 5, J05 or J-5 may refer to:

== In military ==
- HMS J5, a 1916 Royal Australian Navy J class submarine
- Junkers J 5, a German Junkers aircraft
- Shenyang J-5, Chinese version of the MiG-17

== In transportation ==
- GSR Class J5, a 1921 Irish 0-6-0 steam locomotives class
- Mazda J5 Engine, a Mazda piston engine
- LNER Class J5, a class of British steam locomotives
- Peugeot J5, a midsize van manufactured from 1981 to 1993, a rebadged Fiat Ducato
- Piper J-5 'Cub Cruiser', a three-seat aircraft build during the 1940s.
- Jaecoo J5, a subcompact crossover SUV
- Ranger (yacht), an America's Cup racing yacht built 1937

== In music, movies, TV ==
- Fender J5 Telecaster, a guitar model made by Fender
- TVB J5, a TVB channel (Feb 2016–Aug 2017), formerly called TVB HD Jade (高清翡翠台) and TVB Finance & Information Channel (無綫財經·資訊台)
- The Jackson 5, a Motown R&B/soul act
- Johnny 5, the robotic star of the movies Short Circuit and Short Circuit 2
- Jump5, a dance pop group
- Jurassic 5, a hip hop group
- The character J-5 played by Lou Wagner in Lost in Space

== In mathematics and science ==
- ATC code J05 Antivirals for systemic use, a subgroup of the Anatomical Therapeutic Chemical Classification System
- J05: Acute obstructive laryngitis (croup) and epiglottitis ICD-10 code
- Eirene (moon), previously known as S/2003 J 5, a retrograde irregular satellite of Jupiter
- Pentagonal cupola, Johnson Solid number 5

== In consumer electronics ==
- Nikon 1 J5, mirrorless interchangeable lens camera
- Samsung Galaxy J5, a smartphone produced by Samsung

== Other ==
- County Route J5 (California), a County route in San Joaquin County, California
- Joint Chiefs of Global Tax Enforcement (J5), a global joint operational group, formed in mid-2018 to combat transnational tax crime

== See also ==
- 5J (disambiguation)
