= Chief, IRS Criminal Investigation =

American law enforcement executive

Chief, Internal Revenue Service, Criminal Investigation
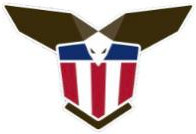
- IRS-CI Logo

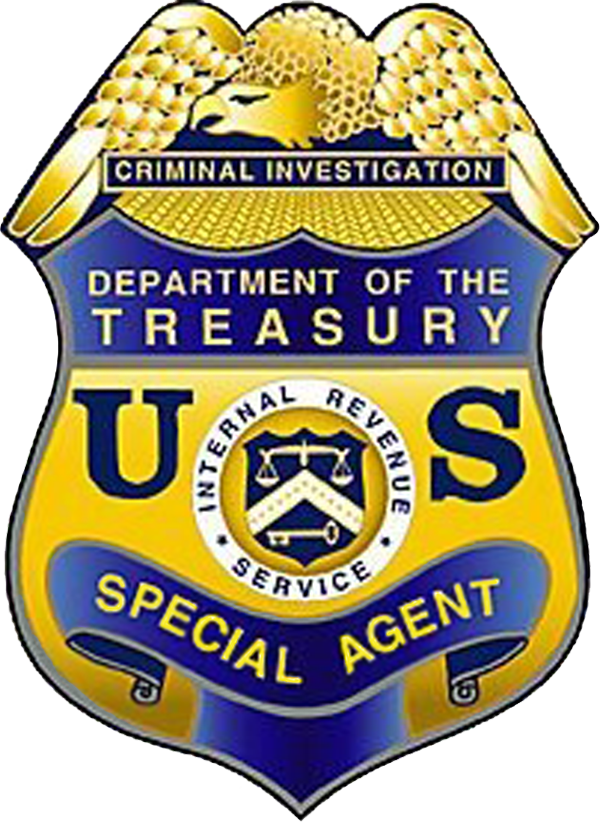
- IRS-CI Special Agent Badge

- Incumbent; Jarod Koopman since April 11, 2026
- Internal Revenue Service, Criminal Investigation
- Style: Chief
- Status: Chief executive
- Reports to: Chief Executive Officer
- Seat: Washington, D.C.
- Appointer: Commissioner of Internal Revenue
- Term length: No fixed term
- Formation: July 1, 1919
- First holder: Elmer Lincoln Irey
- Deputy: Deputy Chief
- Website: www.irs.gov/criminalinvestigation

The chief, Internal Revenue Service, Criminal Investigation, abbreviated as chief, IRS-CI or chief, CI or simply Chief, is the head and chief executive of Internal Revenue Service, Criminal Investigation (IRS-CI), the United States' federal law enforcement agency responsible for investigating potential criminal violations of the U.S. Internal Revenue Code and related financial crimes. Criminal Investigation is a division of the Internal Revenue Service, which in turn is a bureau within the United States Department of the Treasury. The chief is the highest ranking executive within IRS-CI and reports to the chief executive officer.

The chief is appointed by the commissioner of internal revenue and oversees a worldwide staff of approximately 3,300 CI employees, including approximately 2,200 special agents who investigate and assist in the prosecution of criminal tax, money laundering, public corruption, cyber, ID theft, narcotics, terrorist-financing and Bank Secrecy Act related crime cases.

The current chief is Jarod Koopman since April 11, 2026. Prior to being selected chief, Koopman was the chief tax compliance officer, overseeing IRS employees in its enforcement divisions.

== Powers and duties ==
The powers and duties of the chief are spelled out in the Internal Revenue Manual, Part 1, Chapter 1, Section 19.

(1) The chief is responsible for the full range of planning, managing, directing, and executing the worldwide activities of CI. The chief together with the deputy chief, directly supervises the Directors of the HQ offices, as well as the area directors, field operations.

(2) The Office of the Chief includes the following sections:

- Chief of Staff
- Deputy Chief of Staff
- C&E
- EDI
- RPE

(3) The chief of staff, together with the deputy chief of staff, manages the chief's and deputy chief's official appointments, speaking engagements, calendar items, and duties associated with the selection of senior management personnel. Additionally, the chief of staff supervises the commissioner's protection detail which provides daily executive protection to the IRS commissioner.

(4) Communications and Education plans, coordinates, and produces communications products and tools for CI. Communications and Education provides a wide range of products and services to help achieve communications goals to a variety of audiences; employees, managers, the media, tax, accounting and business professionals, and other external and internal stakeholders. Communications and Education also coordinates field office publicity through the PIOs who are special agents trained in media relations. Communications and Education is also the home to CI's Legislative Liaison who manages and enhances CI's relationship with members of Congress, ensures CI sections are informed of pending legislation affecting their areas, and responds to Congressional inquiries and correspondence.

(5) Equity, Diversity & Inclusion is responsible for identifying trends and issues of an EEO and diversity nature, and potential barriers to equal employment opportunity within CI. Equity, Diversity & Inclusion's responsibilities include educating management and employees on equity, diversity & inclusion, how to resolve complaints and conflict in the workplace, and providing observation on recruitment, outreach, promotion, retention, and leadership initiatives, thereby improving workforce demographics to achieve equal opportunity.

(6) Review and Program Evaluation independently reviews, evaluates, and reports on CI field operations, program areas, and headquarters sections in a fair and objective manner. Review and Program Evaluation identifies risks, emerging issues and best practices which affect CI; assess CI's leadership effectiveness, and ability to manage and mitigate risk; evaluate CI operations to ensure investigative alignment with the Compliance Strategy; and to ensure compliance with established policies and prior TIGTA, GAO, and RPE recommendations.

== List of officeholders ==
The following is a complete list of officeholders from 1919 to present.

N°	Picture	Name	Term	Length	Notes
1		Elmer Lincoln Irey	July 1, 1919 – January 26, 1943	23 years, 209 days	First and longest serving Chief
2		William H. Woolf	January 26, 1943 – December 31, 1951	8 years, 339 days	Former Assistant Chief to Elmer L. Irey
3		Frank W. Lohn	January 20, 1952 – November 25, 1952	310 days	Title changed to Director of the Intelligence Division
4		Garland H. Williams	January 1, 1953 – August 31, 1953	242 days	Simultaneously agent in the Bureau of Narcotics
5		A. Walter Fleming	December 20, 1953 – August 15, 1955	1 year, 238 days	Resigned to become Regional Commissioner in New York
6		J. Perry August	October 18, 1955 – June 30, 1959	3 years, 255 days	Former Assistant Regional Commissioner (Intelligence) of the Dallas Region
7		H. Alan Long	June 30, 1959 – December 31, 1965	6 years, 184 days	Resigned to become District Director in Pittsburgh
8		William A. Kolar	December 31, 1965 – June 13, 1970	4 years, 164 days	Former Director of the Internal Security Division
9		Robert K. Lund	October 4, 1970 – June 30, 1972	1 year, 270 days	Former Chief in the Los Angeles District
10		John J. Olszewski	September 3, 1972 – May 9, 1975	2 years, 248 days	Former Assistant Regional Commissioner (Intelligence), Midwest Region
11		Thomas J. Clancy	July 6, 1975 – March 20, 1982	6 years, 257 days	Intelligence Division renamed to Criminal Investigation (CI) during his tenure
12		Richard C. Wassenaar	March 21, 1982 – December 12, 1986	4 years, 266 days	First officeholder to be titled Assistant Commissioner (Criminal Investigation)
13		Anthony V. Langone	February 2, 1987 – April 3, 1988	1 year, 61 days	Former Deputy Assistant Commissioner (Criminal Investigation)
14		Bruce V. Milburn	May 8, 1988 – October 20, 1989	1 year, 165 days	Former Assistant Regional Commissioner in North Atlantic Region
15		Inar "Smitty" Morics	December 3, 1989 – January 10, 1993	3 years, 38 days	Resigned to become District Director in St. Paul, Minnesota
16		Donald K. Vogel	February 28, 1993 – December 31, 1995	2 years, 306 days	Former Assistant Regional Commissioner for Criminal Investigation in Midwest Region
17		Ted F. Brown	May 28, 1996 – April 11, 1999	2 years, 318 days	First Director of Refund Fraud in 1994
18		Mark E. Matthews	January 1, 2000 – May 31, 2002	2 years, 150 days	First Chief that was not a Special Agent or Postal Inspector before being named Chief
19		David B. Palmer	November 7, 2002 – January 8, 2004	1 year, 62 days	Former Director of Field Operations for the Central Area
20		Nancy Jardini	January 9, 2004 – February 25, 2007	3 years, 47 days	First female Chief
21		Eileen Mayer	February 26, 2007 – January 31, 2009	1 year, 340 days	Former prosecutor with the U.S. Attorney's Office
22		Victor Song	February 1, 2009 – March 30, 2012	3 years, 58 days	Retired to serve as Executive Vice President of Compliance for Samsung Electronics America
23		Richard Weber	April 1, 2012 – May 31, 2017	5 years, 60 days	Recipient of the 2015 Presidential Rank Award
24		Don Fort	June 1, 2017 – September 30, 2020	3 years, 121 days	Chief during the agency's 100th anniversary
25		Jim Lee	October 1, 2020 – March 31, 2024	3 years, 182 days	Former Deputy Chief and Director of Field Operations
26		Guy Ficco	April 1, 2024 – April 10, 2026	2 years, 201 days	Former Deputy Chief and Executive Director of Global Operations, Policy and Support
27		Jarod Koopman	April 11, 2026 – Present	191 days	Former Chief Tax Compliance Officer

== See also ==
- Internal Revenue Service, Criminal Investigation
- Director of the Central Intelligence Agency
- Director of the Federal Bureau of Investigation
- Director of the United States Marshals Service
- Director of the United States Secret Service
- Federal law enforcement in the United States
