= IRS Criminal Investigation =

Criminal Investigation division of the IRS

Internal Revenue Service Criminal Investigation
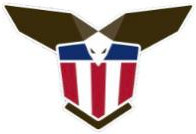
- IRS-CI Logo

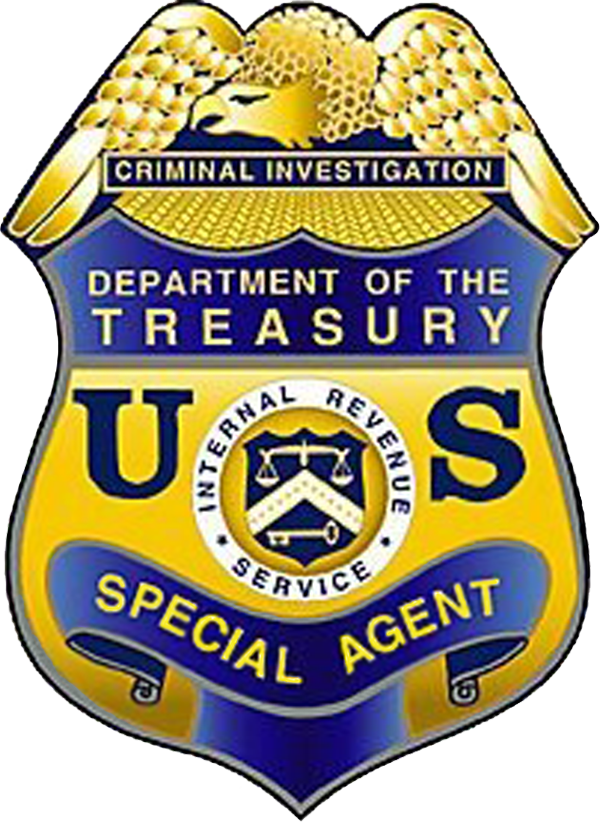
- IRS-CI Special Agent Badge
- Abbreviation: IRS-CI
- Motto: Honor The Badge; Preserve The Legacy; Master Your Craft; Inspire The Future

Agency overview
- Formed: July 1, 1919
- Employees: 3,015 (FY 2022)
- Annual budget: US$1.3 billion (FY 2002)

Jurisdictional structure
- Federal agency: United States
- Operations jurisdiction: United States
- General nature: Federal law enforcement
- Specialist jurisdiction: Taxation

Operational structure
- Headquarters: 1111 Constitution Ave NW Room 2501; Washington, DC 20224
- Special Agents: 2,200 (approx)
- Agency executive: Jarod Koopman, Chief
- Parent agency: Internal Revenue Service; Department of the Treasury

Website
- irs.gov/criminalinvestigation

Internal Revenue Service, Criminal Investigation (IRS-CI) is the United States federal law enforcement agency responsible for investigating potential criminal violations of the U.S. Internal Revenue Code and related financial crimes, such as money laundering, currency transaction violations, tax-related identity theft fraud and terrorist financing that adversely affect tax administration. While other federal agencies also have investigative jurisdiction for money laundering and some Bank Secrecy Act violations, IRS-CI is the only federal agency that can investigate potential criminal violations of the Internal Revenue Code, in a manner intended to foster confidence in the tax system and deter violations of tax law. Criminal Investigation is a division of the Internal Revenue Service, which in turn is a bureau within the United States Department of the Treasury.

According to information on the IRS web site, the conviction rate for federal tax prosecutions has never fallen below 90 percent. The IRS asserts that their conviction rate is among the highest and that it is a record that is unmatched in federal law enforcement. According to the 2019 annual report, 1500 investigations were initiated by IRS-CI, with 942 prosecutions recommended and 848 sentenced.

IRS-CI is a founding member of the Joint Chiefs of Global Tax Enforcement, a global joint operational group formed in mid-2018 to combat transnational tax crime. IRS-CI is also a member agency of the Organized Crime Drug Enforcement Task Force, a federal drug enforcement program concerned with the disruption of major drug trafficking operations and related crimes, such as money laundering, tax and weapon violations and violent crime.

== History ==
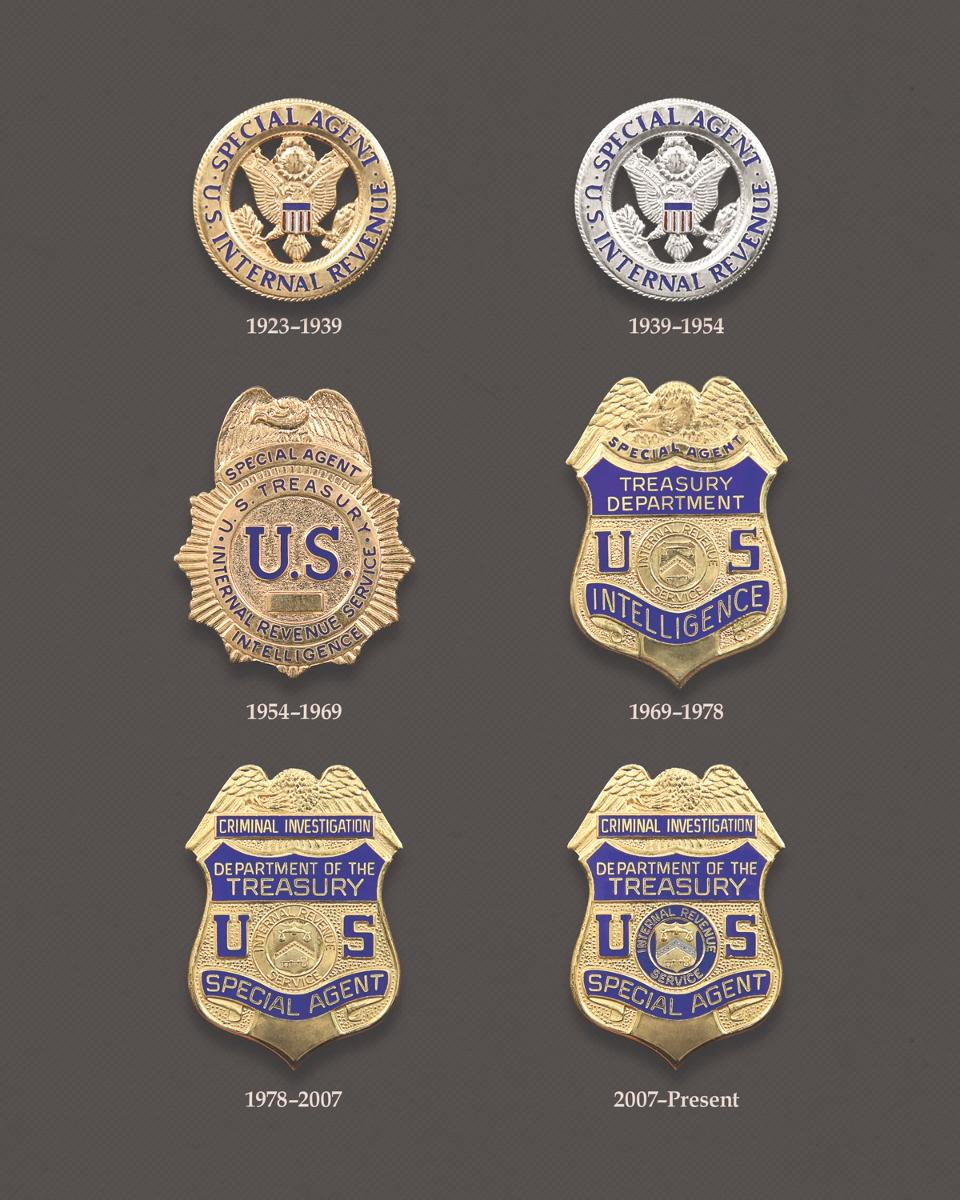
Timeline Of IRS-CI Badges

On July 1, 1919, the Commissioner of Internal Revenue, Daniel C. Roper created the Intelligence Unit to investigate widespread allegations of tax fraud. To establish the Intelligence Unit, six United States Post Office Inspectors were transferred to the Bureau of Internal Revenue to become the first special agents of the organization that would one day become Criminal Investigation. Among the first six, Elmer Lincoln Irey was designated as the Chief of the new unit. Hugh McQuillan, Arthur A. Nichols, Frank Frayser, Everett Partridge and Herbert E. Lucas were the other five that made up the new unit. On October 6, 1919, Irey brought in William H. Woolf from the Office of the Chief Postal Inspector in Washington as his Assistant Chief. They formed the nucleus that became the Intelligence Unit.

The Intelligence Unit quickly became renowned for the financial investigative skill of its special agents. It attained national prominence in the 1930s for the conviction of public enemy number one, Al Capone, for income tax evasion, and its role in solving the Lindbergh kidnapping. From these promising beginnings the Intelligence Unit expanded over the intervening decades, investigating tax evasion by ordinary citizens, prominent businesspersons, government officials, and notorious criminals. Unofficially, the agents in the Intelligence Unit were known as "T-Men" due to their affiliation with the United States Department of the Treasury. In July 1978, the Intelligence Unit changed its name to Criminal Investigation (CI).

Over the years CI's statutory jurisdiction expanded to include money laundering and currency violations in addition to its traditional role in investigating tax violations. However, Criminal Investigation's core mission remains unchanged. It continues to fulfill the important role of helping to ensure the integrity and fairness of the United States tax system. In July 2019, IRS-CI celebrated their 100th anniversary. The agency celebrated the occasion with planned events in distinct IRS-CI Field Offices nationwide including Washington D.C., San Francisco, Las Vegas, and Chicago.

== Organization ==
=== Agency executive ===
Current IRS-CI Chief, Jarod Koopman

IRS-CI is headed by the Chief, Criminal Investigation appointed by the IRS Commissioner. The Chief reports to the Chief Executive Officer and is responsible for the full range of planning, managing, directing, and executing the worldwide activities of CI. The current Chief is Jarod Koopman, who oversees a worldwide staff of approximately 3,300 CI employees, including approximately 2,200 special agents who investigate and assist in the prosecution of criminal tax, money laundering, public corruption, cyber, ID theft, narcotics, terrorist-financing and Bank Secrecy Act related crime cases.

=== Field offices ===
IRS-CI operates 18 field offices in the United States located in Atlanta, Boston, Charlotte, Chicago, Dallas, Denver, Detroit, Florida, Houston, Los Angeles, Newark, New York, Oakland, Philadelphia, Phoenix, Seattle, St. Louis, and Washington D.C. (IRS-CI headquarters). Many of these offices are further subdivided into smaller resident agencies which have jurisdiction over a specific area. These resident agencies are considered to be part of the primary field offices. The IRS-CI headquarters, located in Washington, D.C., controls the flow of the agents and support staff that work out of the field offices across the country.

Each field office is overseen by a Special Agent in Charge (SAC) and assisted by one (or more) Assistant Special Agent in Charge. In addition to the field offices in the United States, IRS-CI, through its Office of International Operations (IO), has special agent attachés stationed in 13 foreign countries:

- Australia
- Barbados
- Canada
- Colombia
- Germany
- Hong Kong
- Mexico
- Netherlands (Europol)
- Panama
- Singapore
- The Bahamas
- United Arab Emirates
- United Kingdom

=== Organizational structure ===
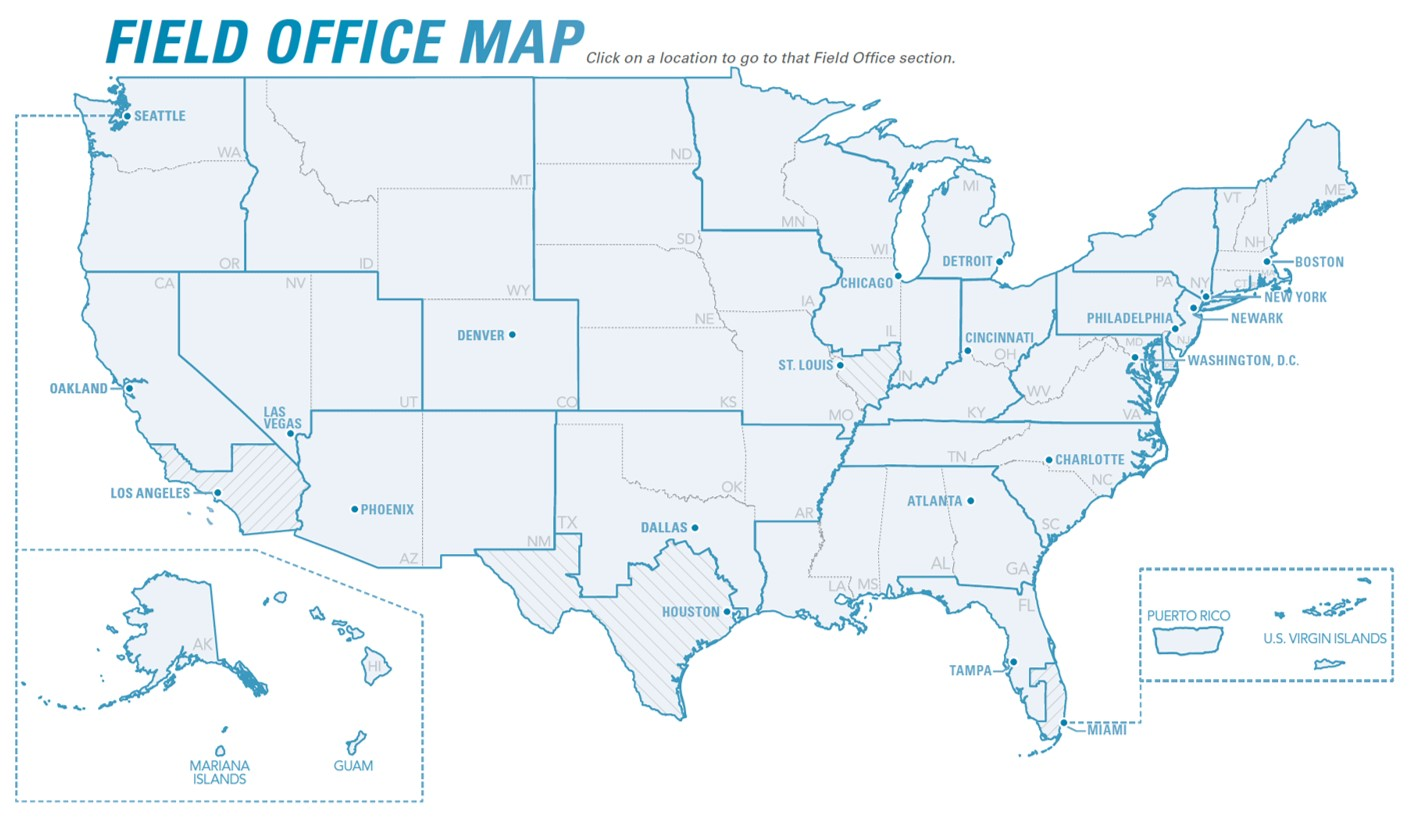
IRS-CI Field Offices Map

- Office of the Chief
  - Commissioner's Protection Detail
  - Office of Communication
- Advanced Analytics and Innovation
  - Applied Analytics
  - Data Management & Governance
  - Innovation
  - Nationally Coordinated Investigations Unit
  - Refund Fraud and Investigative Support
  - Systems and Operational Support
- Cyber and Forensic Services
  - Center for Science and Design
  - Cybercrimes
  - Digital Forensics
- Field Operations
  - Northern Area Field Operations
  - Southern Area Field Operations
  - Western Area Field Operations
- Global Operations
  - Asset Recovery and Investigative Services
  - Financial Crimes
  - Global Operations Policy & Support
  - International Field Operations and International Liaison and Strategy
  - Narcotics and National Security Section
  - Special Investigative Techniques
- Strategy
  - Asset and Knowledge Management
  - Assurance and Advisory
  - Finance
  - Human Resources
  - National Criminal Investigation Training Academy
  - Project Office
  - Workforce Development
- Technology Operations
  - Development
  - Field Operations

=== Rank structure ===
The following is a listing of the rank structure found within IRS-CI (in ascending order):

- Field Agents
  - New Agent Trainee (NAT)
  - Special Agent (SA)
  - Supervisory Special Agent (SSA)
  - Assistant Special Agent-in-Charge (ASAC)
  - Special Agent-in-Charge (SAC)
- Management
  - Directors
    - Advanced Analytics and Innovation
    - Cyber and Forensic Services
    - Field Operations
    - Global Operations
    - Strategy
    - Technology Operations
  - Deputy Chief of Staff
  - Chief of Staff
  - Deputy Chief
  - Chief

=== Special agents ===
IRS-CI Special Agents (GS-1811 Job Series) are commonly called criminal investigators. Special agent training begins with the Special Agent Basic Training Program (SABT) at the Federal Law Enforcement Academy (FLETC) in Glynco, Georgia.

New special agents attend approximately six months of formal training followed by 1-4 years of on-the-job training including:

Name	Abbreviation	Stage
Pre-Basic Orientation Training Program	PB	Phase 1
Criminal Investigator Training Program	CITP	Phase 2
Special Agent Investigative Techniques	SAIT	Phase 3
On-the-Job Training	OJT	Phase 4

Special agents must satisfactorily complete the SAIT to retain employment with IRS-CI.

==== Authority ====
IRS-CI Special Agents are trained to execute arrest and search warrants and conduct authorized undercover operations, including technical surveillance.

Consistent with the safe conduct of such operations, special agents are trained in building-entry and non-lethal defensive tactics training, in harmony with current Federal law enforcement use-of-force training.

Special agents also serve as dignitary protection staff and in air marshal roles.

== Investigation categories ==
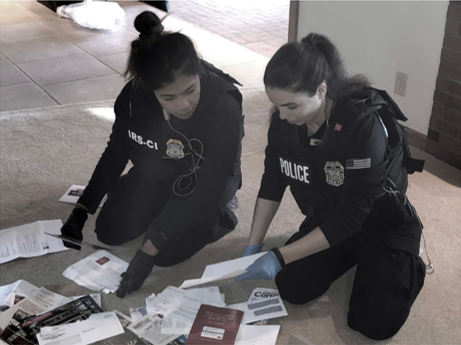
Two IRS-CI Special Agents conducting a search

The Criminal Investigation strategic plan is composed of four interdependent programs:

1. Legal Source Tax Crimes
2. Illegal Source Financial Crimes
3. Narcotics Related Financial Crimes
4. Counterterrorism Financing

These four programs are mutually supportive, and encourage utilization of all statutes within CI's jurisdiction, the grand jury process, and enforcement techniques to combat tax, money laundering and currency crime violations.

Criminal Investigation must investigate and assist in the prosecution of those significant financial investigations that will generate the maximum deterrent effect, enhance voluntary compliance, and promote public confidence in the tax system.

=== Legal source tax crimes ===
Investigating Legal Source Tax Crimes is IRS-CI's primary resource commitment. Legal Source Tax investigations involve taxpayers in legal industries and occupations who earned income legally but chose to evade taxes by violating tax laws, such as not reporting stock buy backs.

=== Illegal source financial crimes ===
The Illegal Source Financial Crimes Program attempts to detect all tax and tax-related violations, as well as money laundering and currency violations. This program recognizes that money gained through illegal sources is part of the "untaxed underground economy" that threatens the voluntary tax compliance system and undermines public confidence in the tax system.

=== Narcotics-related financial crimes ===
The Narcotics-Related Financial Crimes Program was established in 1919, and is one of IRS-CI's oldest initiatives. Its goal is to utilize the financial investigative expertise of its special agents to disrupt and dismantle major drug and money laundering organizations. IRS-CI's role in supporting narcotics related investigations was highlighted in the 1996 book, The Phoenix Solution: Getting Serious About Winning the Drug War, by Vincent T. Bugliosi.

=== Counterterrorism and espionage ===
Following the terrorist attacks of September 11, 2001, IRS Criminal Investigation actively participates in federal counterterrorism investigations. In addition to standard investigative support, IRS-CI Special Agents add financial investigative and computer forensic expertise to terrorism investigations. IRS CI's support on investigations related to counterterrorism was highlighted in the 2013 book Treasury's War: The Unleashing of a New Era of Financial Warfare, by Juan Zarate. Criminal Investigation also actively participates in high-level espionage investigations, for many of the same reasons special agents originally worked on liquor bootlegger, organized crime, and public corruption investigations. In many high-level, complex investigations, criminal actors are well-insulated from culpability apportioned through traditional techniques of evidence development. The common weakness of many high level criminal activities remains money or the financial benefit, which is difficult to conceal.

== Investigative process ==
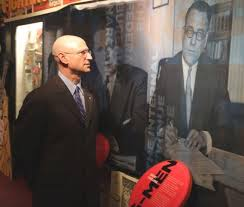
Former Chief Richard Weber Stops To Reflect On The First IRS-CI Chief, Elmer Lincoln Irey

New agent trainees receive advanced training in general criminal investigation technique common to all Federal criminal investigators. Special agents use judicially accepted methods of investigation depending on the allegation, which may be tax or non-tax. Special agents receive advanced training in Federal tax law and approved techniques developed within IRS-CI over decades of investigative activity.

Part 9, Chapter 5 of the Internal Revenue Manual describes material taught to IRS-CI Agents during their six-month basic training at the U.S. Department of Homeland Security's Federal Law Enforcement Training Centers (FLETC) in Glynco, Georgia. For tax charges, special agents in training focus on four primary "methods of proof" to produce evidence leading to a conviction in Federal court: specific items, net worth, expenditures, and bank deposits. These methods relate primarily to evidence gathering based on how an individual has acquired wealth. Each method seeks to compare a suspect's standard of living and sources of income to that income reported for tax purposes.

=== Direct – Specific Item Method ===
Using the Direct-Specific Item Method, the government seeks to substantiate specific items that were not completely or accurately reported for tax purposes.

The government must also show that the items of omission were made willfully to understate the subject's tax liability.

There are three broad categories of schemes suited to the Specific Item Method of proof:

- Understatement of income;
- Overstatement of expenses;
- Fraudulent claims for credits or exemptions.

=== Indirect – Net Worth Method ===
In the case of Holland v. United States, the U.S. Supreme Court determined the Net Worth Method to be an acceptable method of proof in establishing unreported taxable income in a criminal tax investigation.

The formula for calculating the subject's correct taxable income can be broken down into four steps:

- The special agent must first calculate the change in a subject's net worth (assets less liabilities). This is done by determining the subject's net worth at the beginning and end of a period of time (a taxable year or years) and then subtracting the beginning period's net worth figure from the ending period's net worth figure. This computation will yield a change in net worth (either an increase or decrease in net worth).
- The amount of this change in net worth is then adjusted for personal living expenses, nondeductible losses, and nontaxable items to arrive at a corrected adjusted gross income figure.
- The corrected adjusted gross income figure is then adjusted for itemized deductions or the standard deduction amount, and then for exemptions, to arrive at a corrected taxable income figure.
- Finally, by comparing the corrected taxable income figure with the taxable income reported on the tax return, the special agent can determine whether the subject failed to report any taxable income.

=== Indirect – Expenditures Method ===
The Expenditures Method of Proof is a variation of the Net Worth Method of Proof. The Expenditures Method derives in part from United States v. Johnson, United States v. Caserta and Taglianetti v. United States, wherein the respective courts accepted the method to determine unreported income.

The Expenditures Method starts with an appraisal of the subject's net worth situation at the beginning of a period.

If the expenditures have exceeded the amount reported as income and if the net worth at the end of the period is the same as it was at the beginning (or any difference accounted for), then it may be concluded that income has been underreported.

It may be necessary to consider nontaxable receipts during the period in question.

=== Indirect – Bank Deposits Method ===
The bank deposits method of proof is a technique used in legal and tax proceedings to establish the income of an individual or business. Under this method, the total deposits made into the taxpayer’s bank accounts are examined and compared with reported income. Any deposits that exceed reported earnings may be treated as unreported income, unless the taxpayer can provide evidence that the funds came from non-taxable sources such as loans, gifts, or transfers. This method is commonly used by tax authorities to detect underreported income and by courts in financial investigations.

=== Recommendations for prosecution ===
Like all other federal criminal investigators, special agents rely on objective, admissible evidence to develop allegations into successful prosecutions brought through the U.S. Department of Justice and the United States Attorney.

Special agents evaluate allegations of possible criminal acts received from the civil tax sections of the IRS as well as traditional law enforcement sources and direct participation and leadership in Federal task forces and multi-agency investigations.

There is no one method by which Special agents receive information or make recommendations of prosecution to the Department of Justice or the U.S. Attorney.

The criminal referral process in connection with U.S. Federal tax-related offenses generally consists of two stages.

An initial stage referral may be made by the Examination or Collection personnel of the Internal Revenue Service to the IRS Criminal Investigation function, using Form 2797.

After the IRS-CI investigates, evaluates the result of the investigation, and concludes that a recommendation for prosecution should be made, the second stage is a referral made by IRS-CI to the U.S. Department of Justice under Internal Revenue Code section 6103(h)(3)(A) and Treasury Order 150–35.

At any time before the second stage referral, the Department of the Treasury has the legal authority to reach a compromise settlement of a criminal case arising under the U.S. internal revenue laws; after the second stage referral is made, however, only the Department of Justice may compromise the case.

== Equipment ==
IRS-CI Special Agents are the only employees within the IRS authorized to carry and use firearms.

The authority to carry and use firearms is derived from United States Code Title 26, Section 7608, wherein criminal investigators of the IRS are authorized to make arrests under Federal law.

Special agents are trained in the use of and currently issued of the following weapons:

Name	Country of origin	Type	Notes
Glock 19M	Austria	Semi-automatic pistol	
Glock 26	Austria	Semi-automatic pistol	
Remington 870	United States	Shotgun	
Smith & Wesson M&P15	United States	Semi-automatic rifle	

== Line of duty deaths ==
Since its establishment, the IRS CI has lost 5 Special Agents in the line of duty.

== Investigation priorities ==
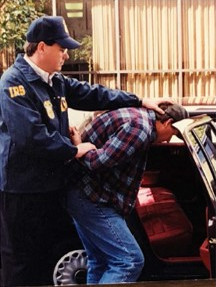
An IRS-CI special agent making an arrest

IRS-CI's highest priority is to enforce U.S. tax laws and support the tax administration. In addition to the enforcement of U.S. tax laws, IRS-CI has identified other investigative priorities:

- Identity Theft Fraud
- Return Preparer and Questionable Refund Fraud
- International Tax Fraud
- Fraud Referral Program
- Political/Public Corruption
- Organized Crime Drug Enforcement Task Forces (OCDETF)
- Homeland Security Task Forces (HSTF)
- Bank Secrecy Act and Suspicious Activity Report (SAR) Review Teams
- Asset Forfeiture
- Voluntary Disclosure Program
- Cybercrimes and Cryptocurrency Fraud
- Counterterrorism and Sovereign Citizens

IRS-CI has also focused on addressing cyber-crime in recent years. For example, special agents played an instrumental role in the 2013 prosecution of Silk Road founder Ross William Ulbricht on charges of money laundering, computer hacking and conspiracy to traffic narcotics. In 2014, IRS-CI created a Cyber Crimes Unit to address the increase in tax crimes that contain cyber components—especially those related to internet fraud, identity theft, and related crimes.

== Recent press ==
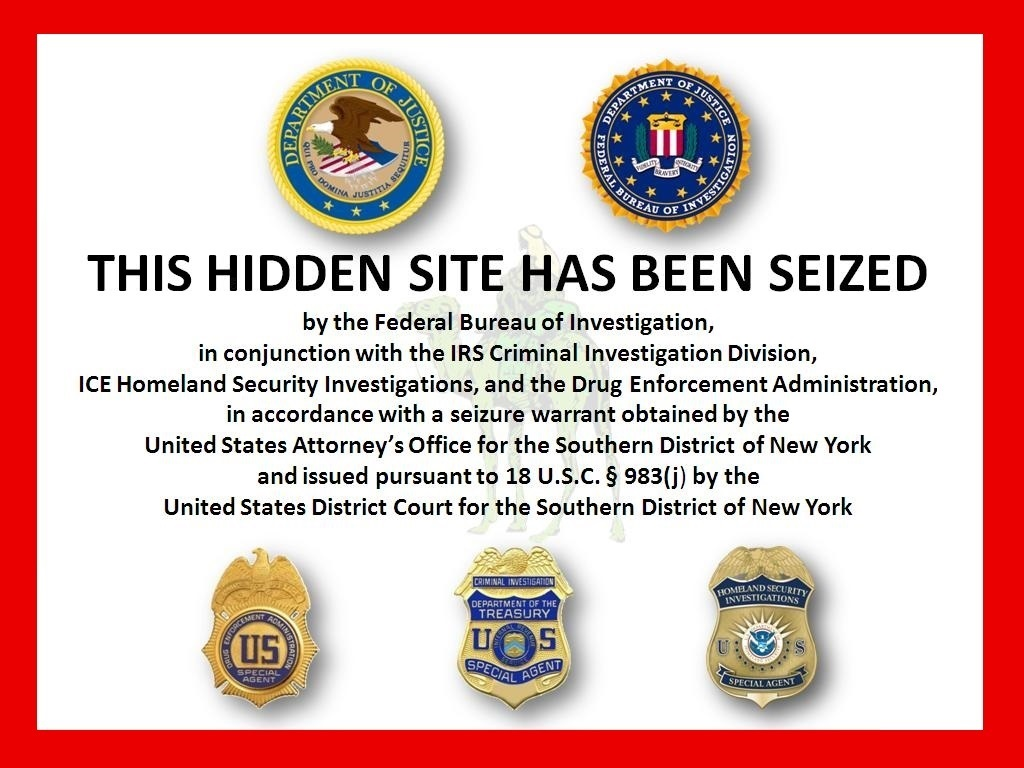
Image placed on original Silk Road after seizure of property by the FBI, in conjunction with IRS-CI, HSI and DEA

Over the years, IRS-CI has continued to maintain a reputation for high levels of expertise in financial investigation and has been involved in a number of high-profile cases in recent years.

Credit Suisse Guilty Plea: In May 2014, Swiss financial giant Credit Suisse pleaded guilty to conspiring to help U.S. taxpayers file false and misleading income tax returns with the IRS. Eight Credit Suisse executives were also charged with defrauding the United States. The agreement forced Credit Suisse to pay a total of $2.6 billion as a penalty for its tax code violations. Credit Suisse admitted that for several decades before 2009, it had operated an illegal cross-border banking business that helped U.S. clients conceal offshore assets from the IRS to avoid paying taxes. IRS-CI Special Agents were directly involved in unmasking these tax violations. A Senate investigative report revealed that Credit Suisse had held more than 22,000 accounts for U.S. clients with assets between $10 billion and $12 billion—95% of these accounts were not reported for tax purposes.

Silk Road case: In January 2015, Ross Ulbricht, the founder of the online black market and the first modern darknet market Silk Road, was convicted by a jury of seven charges, including charges of engaging in a continuing criminal enterprise, narcotics trafficking, money laundering, and computer hacking. The continuing criminal enterprise charge has a minimum sentence of 20 years. The amount of narcotics distributed also triggered an additional 10-year minimum. The government also accused Ulbricht of paying for the murders of at least five people, but there is no evidence that the murders were actually carried out, and the accusations never became formal charges against Ulbricht.

2015 FIFA corruption case: In May 2015, fourteen current and former leaders of soccer's international governing body, FIFA, were indicted on charges of widespread corruption, ultimately leading to the arrest of seven top executives. FIFA leaders were accused of accepting bribes from country representatives in exchange for support in their countries' bids to host the World Cup. The 47-count indictment charged defendants with racketeering, wire fraud, and money laundering conspiracies. IRS-CI played an integral role in exposing the scandal, as IRS-CI opened the initial criminal investigation into former CONCACAF General Secretary Chuck Blazer in 2011 for not filing personal income tax returns. IRS-CI put together a tax case against Blazer that was ultimately used to convince Blazer to supply information to, and cooperate with, the government to build a case against other FIFA officials. In cooperation with the FBI's own investigations into FIFA corruption, multiple police agencies, and diplomats in 33 countries, IRS-CI helped to crack what has been described as "one of the most complicated international white-collar cases in recent memory."

Dennis Hastert Scandal: IRS-CI was instrumental in the 2015 indictment of Dennis Hastert, the longest-serving Republican Speaker of the House, on charges of violating banking laws. Hastert served in Congress between 1987 and 2007, and became a high-paid lobbyist after his retirement from Congress. Before his career as a politician, Hastert worked as a High School teacher and wrestling coach at Yorkville High School in Illinois for 16 years. Hastert violated banking laws by structuring cash withdrawals to avoid reporting requirements. Specifically, he made cash withdrawals of less than $10,000 to hide his efforts to pay $3.5 million to an unnamed person to compensate for and conceal prior "misconduct." At the time of the indictment, Hastert had paid the person $1.7 million.

Kunal Kalra, AKA “shecklemayne”, operation: In August 2019, Kunal Kalra operated an unlicensed Money Service Business (MSB) in which he exchanged about 25 million dollars for drug dealers, credit card fraudsters, and performed other illicit activities. Kalra owned and operated a Bitcoin Kiosk (or Bitcoin ATM) that would allow for the exchange of large amounts of money with no Know Your Customer requirements. This is believed to be the first federal criminal case charging an unlicensed money remitting business that used a Bitcoin kiosk.

Welcome to Video case: In October 2019, Welcome to Video, one of the largest Darkweb child pornography sites in the world was shut down. IRS-CI was instrumental in the investigation by the tracing the bitcoin transactions used by people from all over the world to pay for the illicit material. Jong Woo Son, a South Korean national and the administrator of the website, was arrested and an eventual seizure of the child pornography material was conducted. IRS-CI performed the operation in conjunction with other agencies: U.S. Attorney's Office for the District of Columbia, the Justice Department's Criminal Division, the U.S. Immigration and Customs Enforcement's Homeland Security Investigations (HSI), the National Crime Agency of the United Kingdom and the Korean National Police Agency.

== In popular culture ==
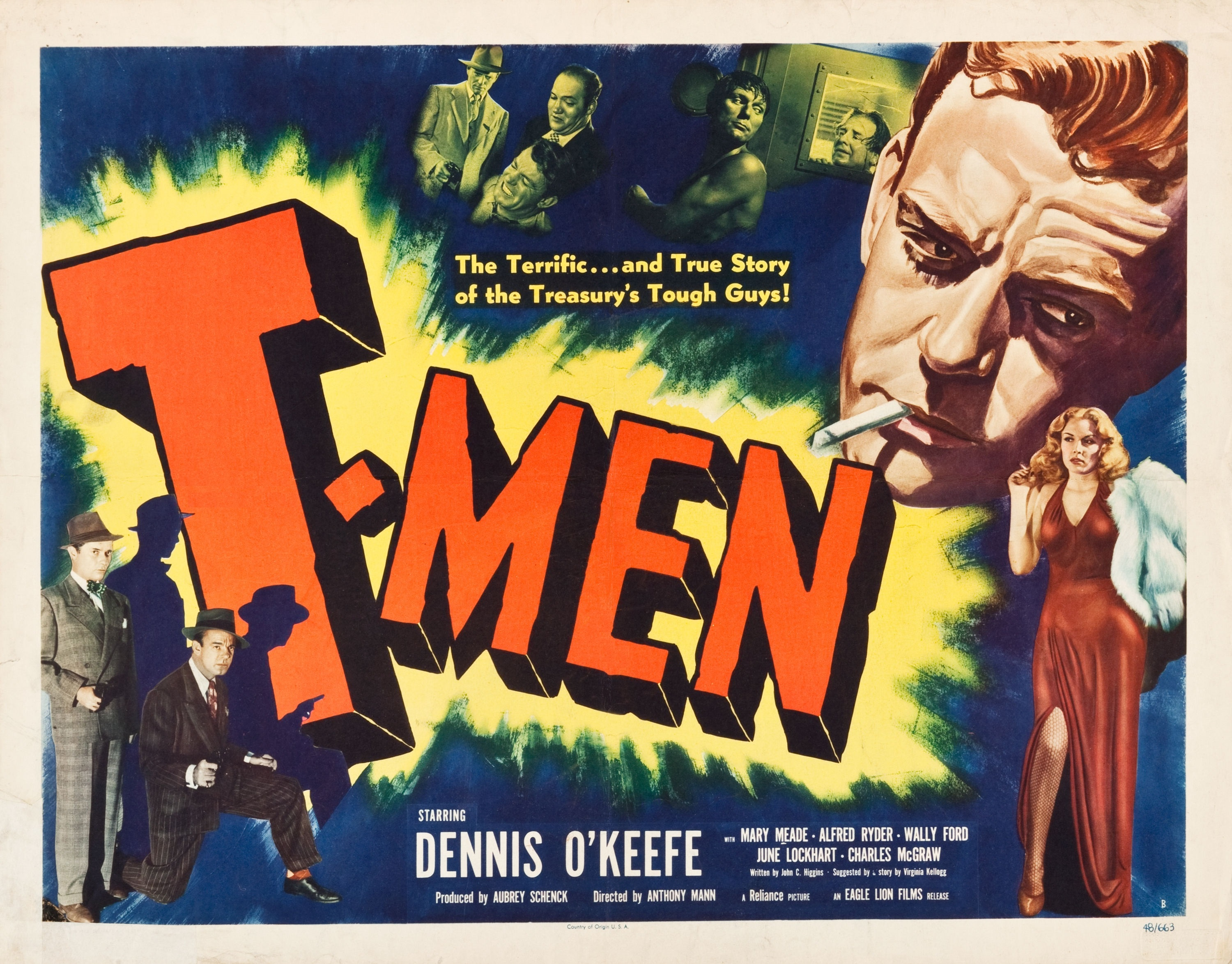
T-Men, the first film to depict IRS-CI

IRS-CI has not been frequently depicted in popular media like other federal law enforcement agencies such as the FBI, DEA and the U.S. Marshals. In fact, when Hollywood could have given credit to IRS-CI for the capture of Al Capone in the film The Untouchables, the credit was given to Eliot Ness and his Untouchables from the Bureau of Prohibition. It is widely argued that Ness is a Hollywood inspired myth and that his character on the film is based on Elmer Lincoln Irey, the first Chief of IRS-CI (then known as the Intelligence Unit), who is historically credited as the real mastermind behind Capone's demise.

The 1947 semidocumentary style film noir T-Men involves two Treasury Department ("T-men") agents who go undercover in Detroit and then Los Angeles in an attempt to break a U.S. currency counterfeiting ring. A Lux Radio Theatre adaptation followed a year later.

The 1971–72 American television crime drama O'Hara, U.S. Treasury involved Treasury Agent Jim O'Hara working under the various law enforcement agencies then part of the Treasury Department.

In 1999, Stephen Desberg (writer) and Bernard Vrancken (illustrator) created IR$, a Franco-Belgian comics series published by Le Lombard in French and Cinebook in English. The 14th book was published in 2012.

The 2008 American drama series Breaking Bad season 4 side plot involves Skyler White, a bookkeeper, caught in an audit involving the IRS Criminal Investigation division after committing accounting fraud.

The 2018–19 American police procedural crime drama television series In the Dark (The CW) features Theodore Bhat as Josh Wallace, an IRS-CI Special Agent investigating Guiding Hope for money laundering.

The 2019 American biographical comedy-drama film The Laundromat shows IRS-CI Special Agents arresting a criminal upon his arrival at the Miami airport.

The 2020 Amazon Prime Video Chilean drama web television series El Presidente shows IRS-CI Chief Richard Weber announcing the charges on the individuals involved on the 2015 FIFA corruption case.

American novelist Diane Kelly wrote a series of humorous mystery novels (12 books, from 2011 through 2017) about a fictitious IRS-CI Special Agent by the name of Tara Holloway.

== See also ==
- Chief, Criminal Investigation
- Computer forensics
- Federal crime
- Federal law enforcement agencies
- Money Laundering Control Act
- Tax evasion
