= Diane Kelly (novelist) =

American novelist

Diane Kelly is an American author of humorous, romantic mystery novels. Kelly was a former tax advisor and assistant state attorney general. In addition, she is a graduate of a Mansfield, Texas Citizens Police Academy.

Her Tara Holloway series are humorous mysteries about an Internal Revenue Service, Criminal Investigation (IRS-CI) Special Agent. The first book in the series, Death, Taxes, and a French Manicure, won a Romance Writers of America Golden Heart Award.

== Books ==
=== Tara Holloway series ===
1. Death, Taxes, and a French Manicure, 2011
2. Death, Taxes, and a Skinny No-Whip Latte, 2012, which won a Reviewers Choice award.
3. Death, Taxes, and Extra-Hold Hairspray, 2012
4. Death, Taxes, and Peach Sangria, 2013
5. Death, Taxes, and Hot-Pink Leg Warmers, 2013
6. Death, Taxes, and Green Tea Ice Cream, 2013
7. Death, Taxes, and Silver Spurs, 2014
8. Death, Taxes, and Cheap Sunglasses, 2015
9. Death, Taxes, and a Chocolate Cannoli, 2015
10. Death, Taxes, and a Satin Garter, 2016
11. Death, Taxes, and Sweet Potato Fries, 2017
12. Death, Taxes, and a Shotgun Wedding, 2017

==== Tara Holloway e-novellas ====
- Death, Taxes, and a Sequined Clutch, 2012
- Death, Taxes, and Mistletoe Mayhem, 2013
- Death, Taxes, and Pecan Pie, 2017

=== Paw Enforcement ===
1. Paw Enforcement, 2014
2. Paw and Order, 2014
3. Laying Down the Paw, 2015
4. Against the Paw, 2016
5. Above the Paw, 2016
6. Enforcing the Paw, 2017
7. The Long Paw of the Law, 2018
8. Paw of the Jungle, 2019
9. Bending the Paw, 2020
10. Pawfully Wedded, 2024

==== Paw Enforcement e-novellas ====
- Upholding the Paw, 2015
- Love Unleashed, 2017

=== House-Flipper Mysteries ===
1. Dead as a Door Knocker, 2019
2. Dead in the Doorway, 2020
3. Murder with a View, 2021
4. Batten Down the Belfry, 2022
5. Primer and Punishment, 2023
6. Four Alarm Homicide, 2024
7. Dead Post Society, 2025

=== The Mountain Lodge Mysteries ===
1. Getaway With Murder, 2021
2. A Trip With Trouble, 2022
3. Snow Place for Murder, 2023

=== Southern Homebrew Mysteries ===
1. The Moonshine Shack Murder, 2021
2. The Proof Is in the Poison, 2022
3. Fiddling With Fate, 2023

=== Other works ===
- Love, Luck, and Little Green Men, self-published, 2013
- "Five Gold Smuggling Rings", Amazon StoryFront, 2013
