= Narco-submarine =

Submersible used by drug smugglers

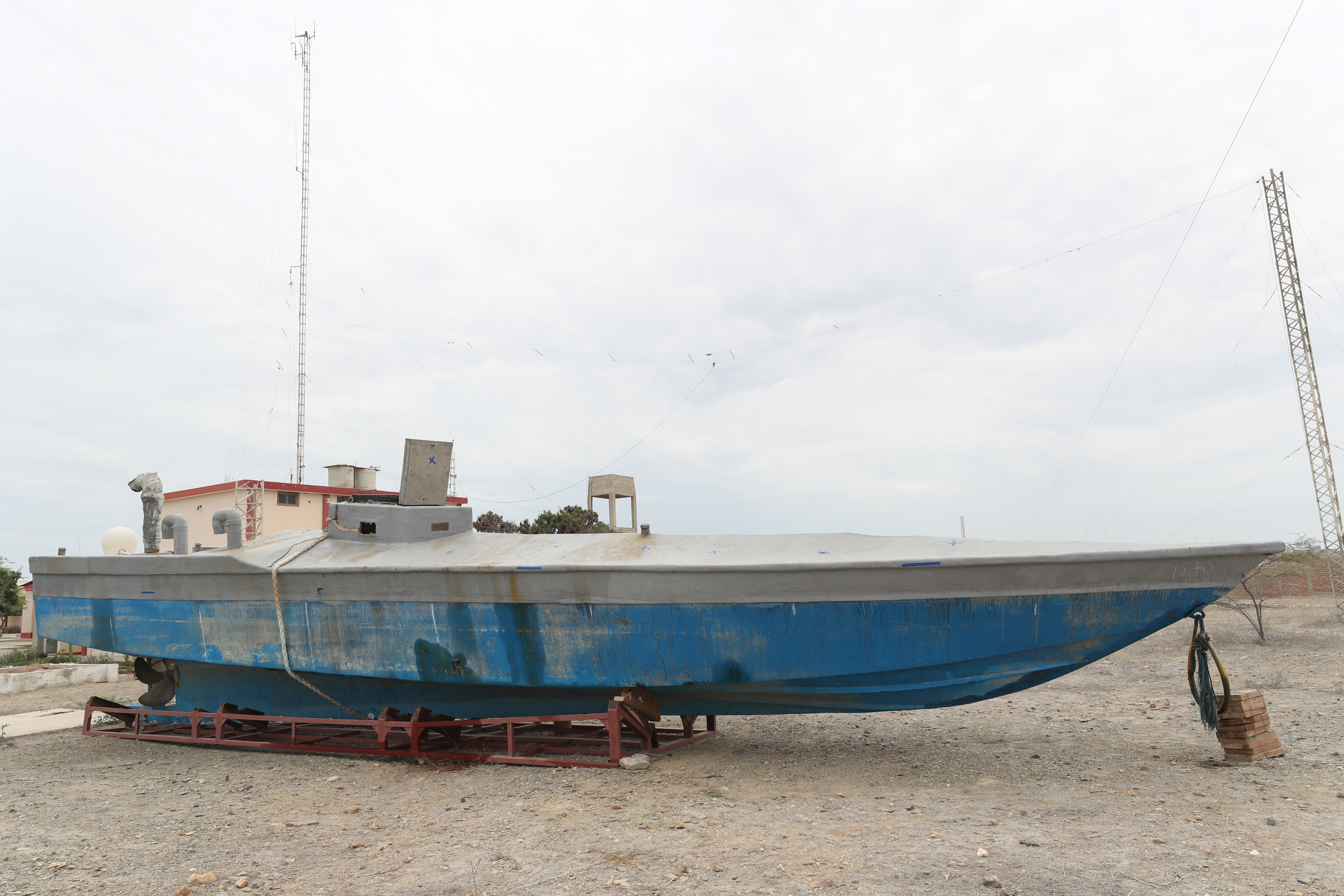
A narco-submarine captured by the Peruvian Navy in December 2019

A narco-submarine (also called a drug sub or narco-sub) is a type of custom ocean-going, self-propelled, semi-submersible or fully submersible vessel built by (or for) drug smugglers.

Newer semi-submersibles are almost fully submersible in order to reduce the likelihood of detection by visual, radar, sonar, or infrared systems. Cargo capacity varies widely with vessel size, although several tons is typical. In 2015, the largest known cargo of 7.7 tonnes (17,000 lb) was seized on a semi-submersible craft. Some contemporary narco-subs are capable of crossing the Atlantic Ocean. Meanwhile, recently captured vessels in the central Pacific during the mid 2020s indicate said vessels are increasingly durable enough for their operators to attempt voyages across the Pacific to Oceania.

== History ==
During the Prohibition in the United States, bootleggers used low-profile riverboats to evade authorities.

In the 1980s, go-fast boats were the smuggling vessel of choice in many parts of the world. Go-fast boats became more vulnerable to radar detection as radar technology improved, leading to the development of semi-submersibles.

In 1988, an uncrewed 6.4-metre (21 ft) submarine was found off Boca Raton, Florida. It was designed to be towed by a boat and submerged by remote control. The sub was empty, but officials and authorities believe it was used for smuggling after it was realized the hatch could be opened only from the outside.

=== 2000s ===
In 2006 a "submarine" was seized 166 km (90 nmi; 103 mi) southwest of Costa Rica. The U.S. Coast Guard dubbed it Bigfoot because they heard rumors of their existence, but had never seen any prior to this find. In 2006, the U.S. detected three vessels in total, and they estimated between twenty-five and forty semi-subs departed from South America in 2007.

In 2006, a 10 m (33 ft) sub was discovered on the north coast of Spain. While its use is unconfirmed, it is speculated to have been built by, or for, narco-traffickers.

In March 2006, according to a press release, the Calabrian criminal organization 'Ndrangheta ordered a shipment of nine tons of cocaine to be transported by a narco-submarine from Colombia to Italy, but according to a countering press release, the vessel was discovered by Colombian and Italian police during construction.

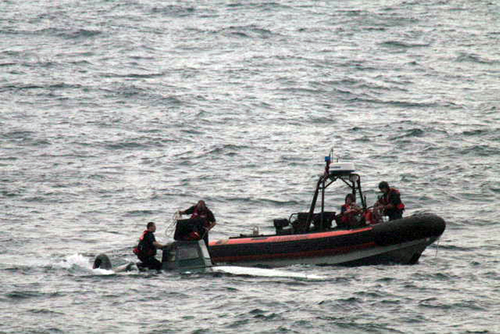
A submarine was seized by the U.S. Coast Guard in international waters off Guatemala on September 17, 2008.

During the first six months of 2008, the U.S. Coast Guard and U.S. Navy detected forty-two subs off the coasts of Central America, but few seizures resulted. According to various press-releases, the projected eighty-five narco-submarine voyages by the end of 2008 could potentially bring about 544 tons of cocaine to U.S. customers. In 2008, the Mexican Navy intercepted a 10 m (33 ft) submarine in international waters about 200 km (110 nmi; 120 mi) southwest of Oaxaca. Mexican Navy Special Forces fast-roped from a helicopter on to its deck and arrested four smugglers. According to one press-release, the vessel carried 5.3 tons of cocaine; it was towed to Huatulco, Oaxaca, by a Mexican Navy patrol boat. Also in 2008, the U.S. Coast Guard captured a semi-submersible vessel in international waters about 563 km (304 nmi; 350 mi) west of Guatemala; it was carrying 7.0 tons of cocaine. The 18 m (59 ft) steel/fiberglass vessel was detected by a U.S. Navy aircraft as part of Operation Panama Express, and was intercepted by Coast Guard Law Enforcement Detachment 402 aboard USS McInerney. Five days later, an 18 m (59 ft) semi-submersible was seized in international waters by the USCGC Midgett about 322 km (174 nmi; 200 mi) south of Guatemala. Several other submarines were intercepted, but not seized because their crews scuttled them upon interception.

In 2009, the U.S. detected "as many as sixty" submarine related events, and calculated they were moving as much as a ton of cocaine daily. In the same year, three submarines were seized on the shores of the Pacific coast, loaded with 1.5 tons of cocaine. The Colombian Navy had intercepted or discovered thirty-three submarines by 2009.

=== 2010s ===
After the November 5, 2010 arrest of Harold Mauricio Poveda, a key Mexican–Colombian link, enhanced interrogation revealed that the FARC (Revolutionary Armed Forces of Colombia) were behind the construction of submarines and were collaborating with the Sinaloa Cartel to fund their activities.

In 2012, United States Coast Guard officials expressed concerns such vessels could potentially be used for terrorism.

USCGC Munro crew intercepts suspected drug smuggling vessel, June 18, 2019

In 2015, the largest recorded seizure was after a cargo of 7.7 tonnes (17,000 lb) was seized on a semi-submersible by USCGC Stratton.

In 2016, the U.S. Coast Guard seized a semi-submersible in international waters about 300 miles west of Panama, carrying about 6 tons of cocaine with a street value of about $200 million to U.S. customers.

In 2017, the U.S. Coast Guard detained a semi-submersible off the coast of Texas carrying 1.7 tonnes (3,800 lb) of cocaine, and on 13 November the US Coast Guard located and seized another one off the coast of Panama.

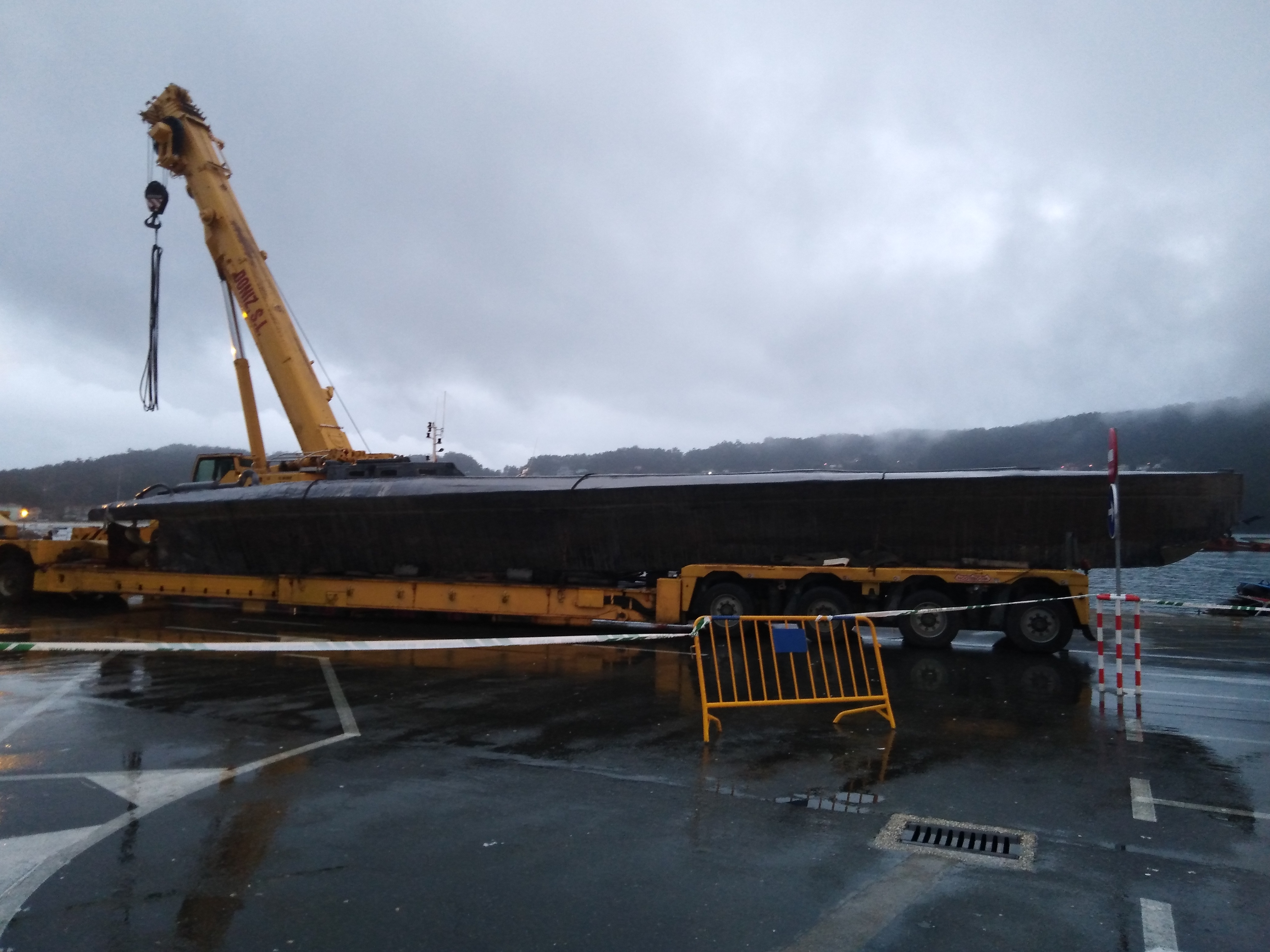
Narco-submarine apprehended in Aldán (Galicia).

In November 2019, a semi-submersible carrying 3 tonnes of cocaine hydrochloride was captured off the Galician coast of Spain after its three crew members—one Spanish and two Ecuadorian nationals—abandoned and attempted to scuttle the vessel. The approximately one-month voyage had begun on the Amazon River, entered the Atlantic Ocean through Brazil and continued toward the European mainland. The operation marked the first capture of a semi-submersible drug-smuggling vessel in Europe.

A narco-submarine was captured by the Peruvian Navy on 8 December 2019 carrying over 2 metric tons (4,400 lb) of cocaine off of the coast of the Department of Piura.

=== 2020s ===
According to a press-release, on November 5, 2020, a submarine was seized in Colombia. A further interception was made in October 2021 by the Ecuadorian naval training ship Guayas in the Pacific Ocean.

The drug trafficker Laureano Oubiña affirmed the existence of a marine cemetery of narco-submarines near the Canary Islands (Spain).

In February 2021, a European-made semi-submersible under construction was found in a warehouse in Málaga, Spain, during a multinational law-enforcement operation. The vessel was 9 metres long and was estimated to have capacity for carrying up to 2 tonnes of drugs. EMCDDA and Europol cited the case as demonstrating that semi-submersibles could also be constructed in Europe.

A 22 metres (72 ft) long semi-submersible made of vinyl carbon fiber, christened by its builders Poseidón was found sunk without cargo by the Guardia Civil in the Ría de Arousa in March 2023. The vessel had a central hold with a load capacity of five tons, a forward ballast tank and a diesel engine at stern.

In 2024, the Colombian Navy captured a semi-submersible carrying 5 tonnes of cocaine 1,200 miles southwest of Clipperton Island in the Eastern Pacific in a 62 country operation. Having been captured over 3,000 miles from the Colombian coast, the incident has been cited as proof that drug cartels are now willing to use narco-submersibles for direct, long-distance drug smuggling to Australia and New Zealand via a new route exceeding 4,000 miles rather than conventionally hiding smaller amounts of narcotics in commercial shipping.

Over the next year, at least three narco-submarines were discovered in the Solomon Islands alongside another in Tonga after being abandoned by their operators; which has generated concern as the current set of local laws, lack of coast guard coordination, and inexperience within national law enforcement agencies have left Oceanian island nations unprepared to counter the illicit trade. Besides Oceania, narco-submarines have also begun appearing in West African countries like Sierra Leone due to public institutions being more vulnerable to state capture than European counterparts while their locations are ideal relay points to transfer narcotics more easily to European markets via drug mules or hidden amidst local export containers.

In 2025, the United States military destroyed a semi-submersible during the 2025 United States strikes on Venezuelan boats and the 2025 United States naval deployment in the Caribbean. It was confirmed that there were some survivors of the attack that were later captured by the U.S.

In January 2026, Australian and Fijian police managed to capture a narco-submarine shipment of over 2 tonnes of cocaine in Tavua, Fiji. Four Ecuadorian nationals and two locals were also arrested amidst a ship-to-shore transfer from a boat after scuttling the submarine.

In March 2026, as a part of the Ecuadorian conflict (2024–present), Ecuador sank a Narco-submarine located in a mangrove swamp in the Cayapas–Mataje nature reserve near the Northern border, with a drug smuggling camp located nearby.

=== Crewed ===
==== Semi-submersible ====
Most vessels commonly described as narco-submarines are purpose-built semi-submersibles rather than conventional submarines. They are designed to travel with most of the hull below the waterline, reducing their visual profile and making detection more difficult. Vessels seized in the Americas have frequently been constructed in remote areas of the Amazon region, including Colombia, and have been used to transport multi-tonne cocaine shipments.

Construction sites have historically been selected for concealment, access to river systems through which equipment and materials can be moved, and proximity to the sea. Construction and operation can require specialist skills including engineering, welding, electrical work, fibreglass construction, maritime navigation and experienced seafaring.

A 2016 case study of vessels developed by the Revolutionary Armed Forces of Colombia described three broad phases of technological development. Experimental designs between 1992 and 2004 were comparatively limited in capability; a prototyping period in 2005–2006 introduced more capable self-propelled semi-submersibles; and designs observed from 2007 became more standardised, with greater speed and carrying capacity and, in some cases, steel construction, advanced navigation systems, GPS and measures intended to reduce detection. The study described a progression from semi-submersibles intended for a single voyage toward more sophisticated craft capable of repeated journeys.

Conditions for crews can be severe. Accounts examined by Jacome Jaramillo describe cramped interiors, lack of running water, prolonged periods without sleep, engine noise and fumes; vessels have also been deliberately scuttled when interception appeared imminent.

Europol reported in 2026 that semi-submersibles built specifically for cocaine trafficking were becoming increasingly sophisticated and capable of travelling longer distances, with improvements in vessel design facilitating Atlantic crossings.

==== Typical characteristics ====
These are the typical characteristics for semi-submersibles as stated by the U.S. Joint Interagency Task Force South:

- Hull material: wood, fiberglass, or steel
- Length 12–24 m
- Freeboard 0.5 m
- Engines: single or twin diesel
- Fuel capacity: 5.6 cubic metres
- Range: 3200 kilometers
- Speed: 11 km/h or more
- Crew: 4
- Capacity 4–12 metric tons
- Control: human or remote

==== True submarines ====
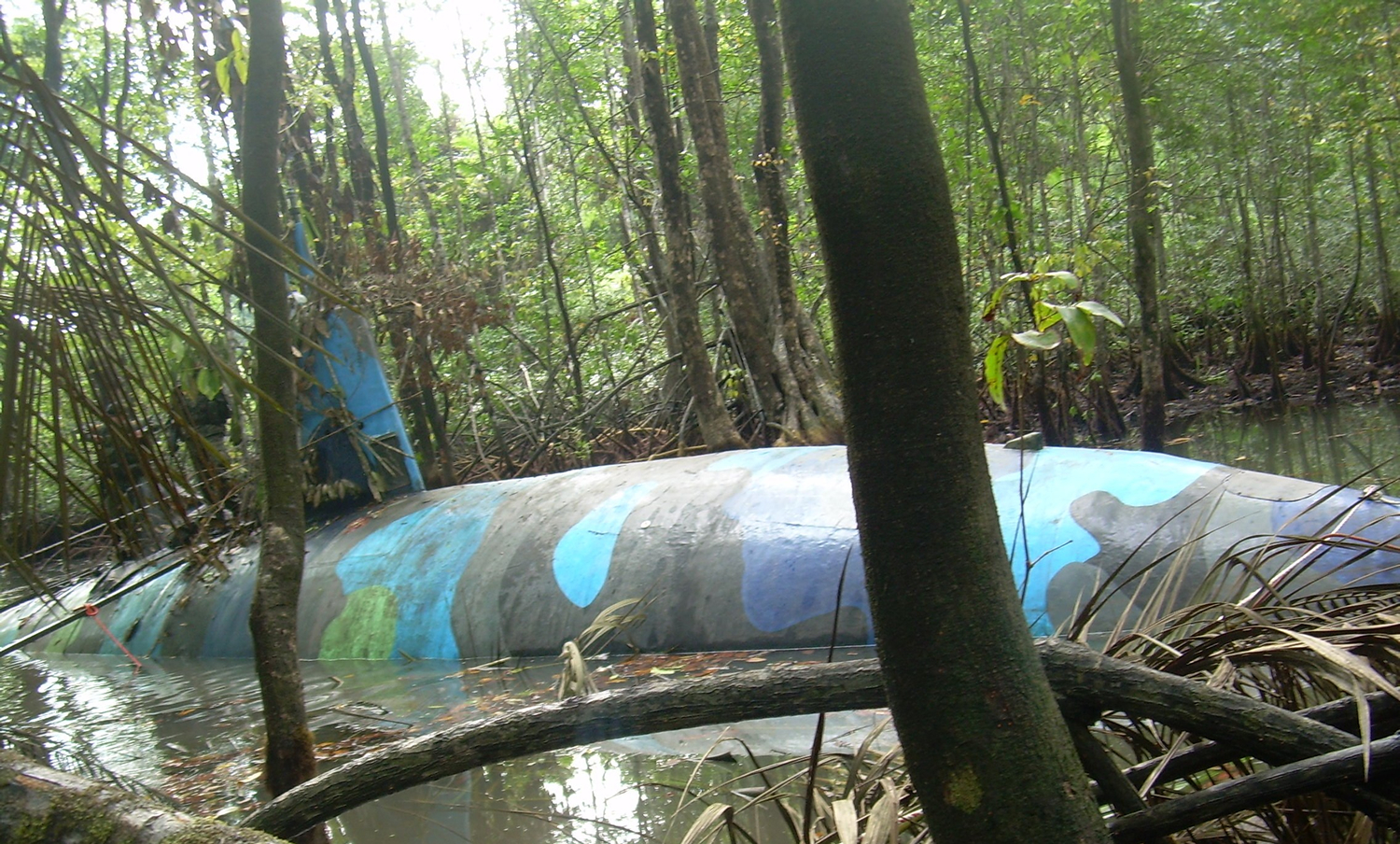
A true submarine seized in Ecuador in July 2010

Narco-submarines were considered by officials to be an oddity until 2000, when Colombian Anti-Narcotics Police discovered what was reported to be a half-built 36 m-long true submarine in a warehouse outside Bogotá. The double-hulled steel vessel could have traveled 3,700 kilometers, dived 100 m, and could have carried about 15 tonnes of cocaine.

On July 3, 2010 the Ecuadorian authorities seized a fully functional, completely submersible diesel-electric submarine in the jungles bordering Ecuador and Colombia. It had a cylindrical fiberglass and kevlar hull 31 m (102 ft) long, a 3 m (9.8 ft) conning tower with periscope, and air conditioning. The vessel had the capacity for about 10 tonnes of cargo, a crew of five or six people, the ability to fully submerge down to 20 m (66 ft), and the capacity for long-range underwater operation. Ecuadorean authorities seized the vessel before its maiden voyage.

On February 14, 2011 another submarine was seized by the Colombian Navy. The 31 m-long fiberglass and Kevlar vessel was found hidden in a jungle area in Timbiquí, in south-western Colombia. It was capable of travelling 9 m (30 ft) below water and it could carry four people and up to 8 tonnes of cargo.

=== Uncrewed ===
In 2022, Spanish police seized three unmanned underwater vehicles used to smuggle drugs across the Strait of Gibraltar from Morocco, the first known interception of such devices. The drones, carrying up to 200 kg of narcotics each, were linked to French cartels. The operation led to eight arrests and exposed a gang using advanced drones and modified vehicles for trafficking across Europe (BBC, 2022).

Europol assessed in 2026 that autonomous semi-submersibles equipped with antennas and a modem were likely already capable of crossing the Atlantic without a crew on board, and that autonomous trafficking methods were likely to undergo further refinement.

=== Whale-shaped mini-submarines ===
In 2025, international drug cartels began using sophisticated whale-shaped mini submarines to smuggle cocaine into Australia via Cyprus. These vessels are transported on cargo ships, dropped in international waters, then retrieved by smaller boats to deliver drugs ashore, posing a significant challenge to law enforcement detection efforts.

== Operations ==
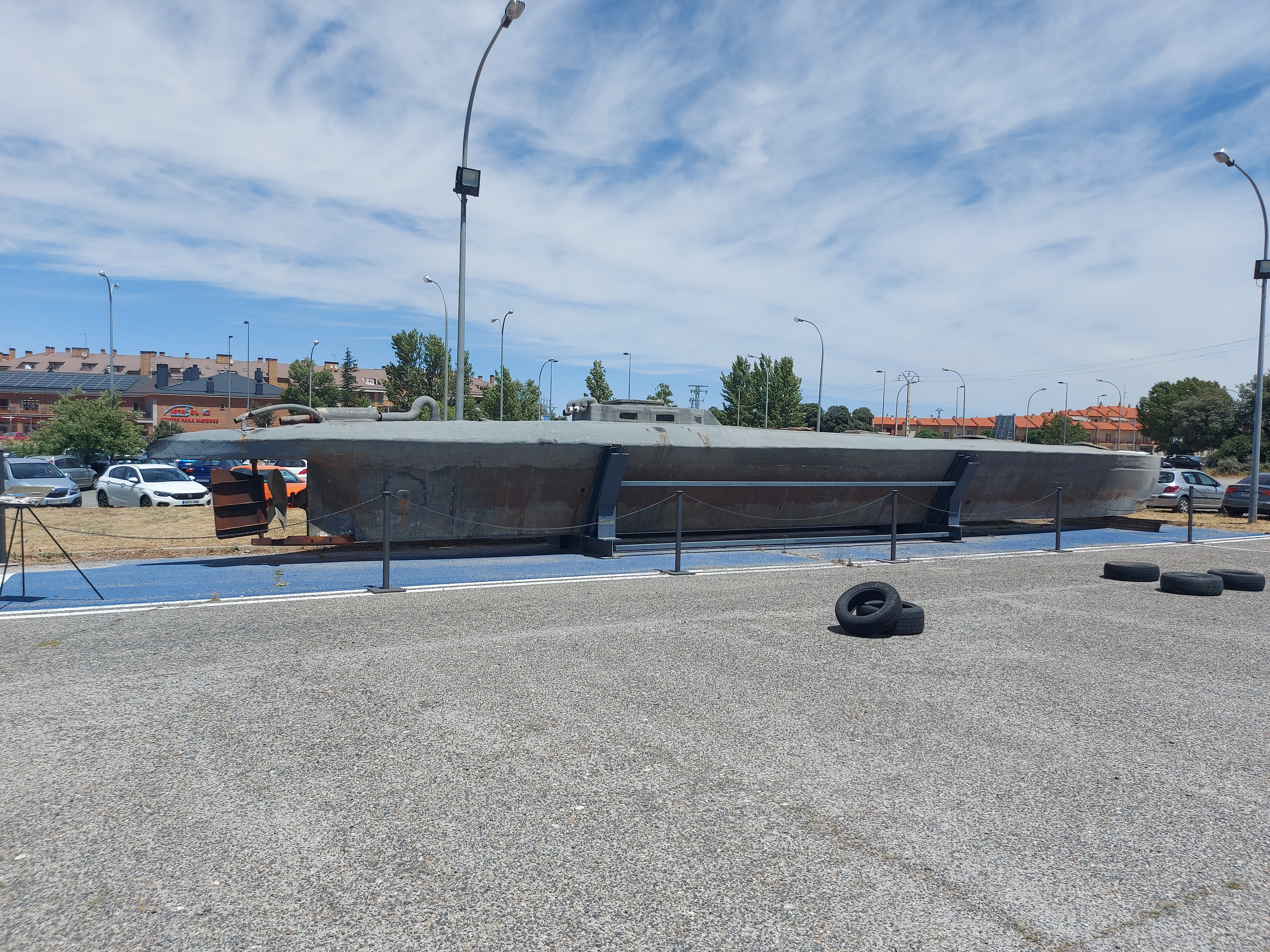
Transatlantic smuggling submarine guarded by the National Police Corps of Spain at the National Police School in Ávila.

=== Operators ===
- Clan del Golfo
- National Liberation Army (ELN)
- Oliver Sinisterra Front
- Revolutionary Armed Forces of Colombia (FARC)
- Sinaloa Cartel

=== Routes ===
The western Colombian shore is ideal for smuggling. Of the two tons of cocaine coming out of Colombia daily, about a third leave via the Pacific coast in semi-submersibles. Homeland Security estimate submarines carry one-third of smuggled maritime goods to United States customers, while claiming they "are clueless" about the rest.

Elsewhere, the U.S. Coast Guard say smugglers are evolving complete logistics: fishing vessels along the way warn the crews against patrols and provide them with refreshments, while offshore refueling vessels provide unlimited loiter time so smugglers can avoid coastal areas. For smugglers, the trips are worth the investment—a nine-ton load earns nearly US$200 million wholesale from U.S. customers. Professional fishermen are often at the controls and earn about US$3,000 after completing the excursion.

Submarine smugglers unload their cargo onto fast-boats for the final leg to shore. According to press-releases, none of the submarines are known to unload at North American ports or beaches.

Drug mules of the Chipitos branch of the Sinaloa Cartel reportedly hate submarine duty.

=== Atlantic and European routes ===
Historically, semi-submersibles used for cocaine trafficking were concentrated in the Americas, including Pacific routes from Colombia and Ecuador toward Central America and Mexico. Their use has since expanded to transatlantic trafficking. The 2019 Galicia case documented a one-month voyage from the Amazon River, through Brazil and across the Atlantic toward Europe. In 2026, Europol assessed that semi-submersibles and other non-commercial vessels were being used for transatlantic transport and that seizures near the Azores and Galicia demonstrated the expanded range and technical capability of these craft.

Europol reported that improvements in semi-submersible design had facilitated Atlantic crossings. In March 2025, a semi-submersible carrying approximately 6.5 tonnes of cocaine was intercepted near the Azores; Europol described it as the largest European Union seizure involving a semi-submersible. In mid-September 2025, another semi-submersible was used to traffic more than 3 tonnes of cocaine to the Galician coast of Spain.

== Countermeasures ==
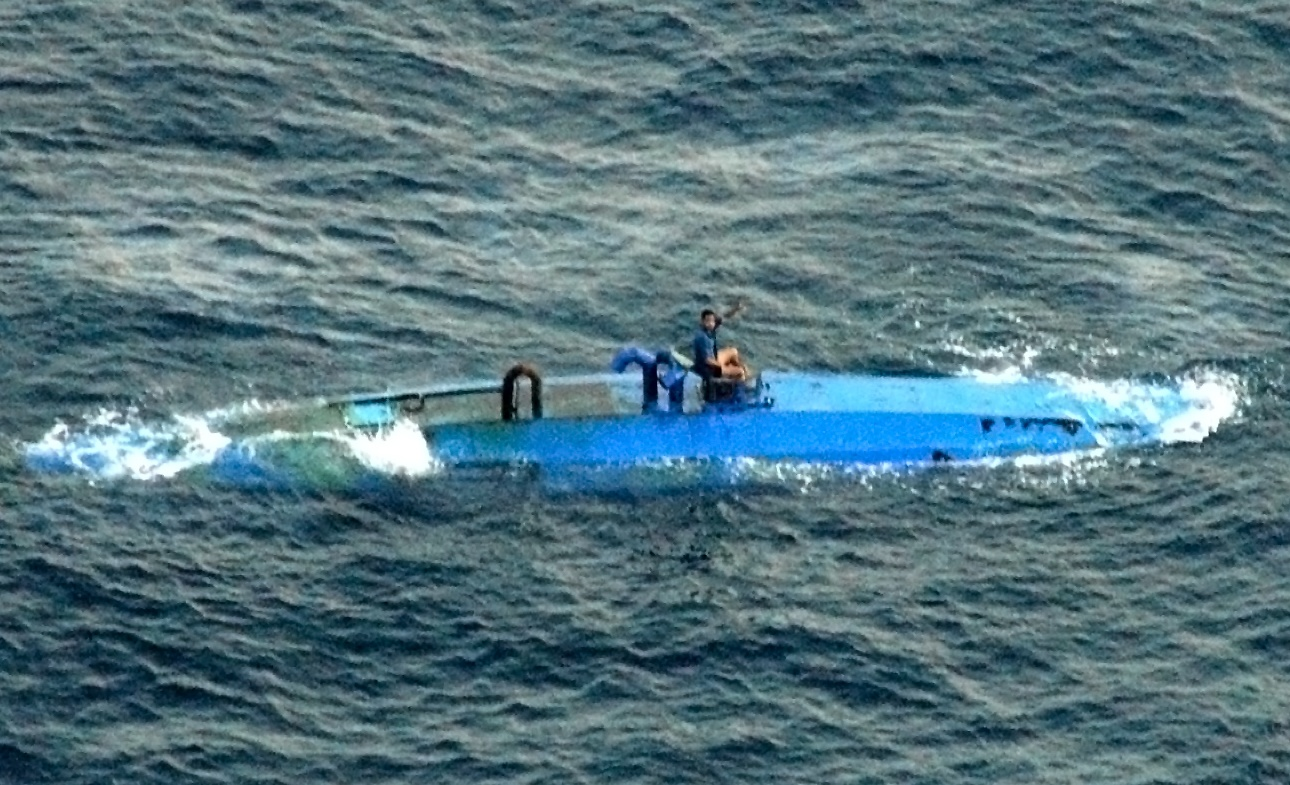
A narco-submarine moments before being intercepted by the United States Navy (August 2007).

=== Detection and interdiction ===
The growing use of semi-submersibles and other non-commercial trafficking vessels has created challenges for conventional surveillance and interdiction. In 2007, the U.S. Coast Guard adjusted their underwater acoustic sensors to listen for submarines. According to a 2019 press-release, the U.S. Coast Guard reports they capture only 11% of submarines on the East Pacific route. The same source acknowledged that the U.S. Coast Guard was overstretched at the time. In 2026, Europol assessed that the shift toward at-sea transfers, semi-submersibles and deep concealment had created new blind spots in maritime surveillance, and that maritime monitoring needed to extend beyond commercial ports to smaller harbours, coastal zones and open-sea corridors.

Maritime domain awareness (MDA) relies on information sharing and analysis across agencies and countries. In its operational form, MDA is used to direct patrol and interdiction activities. MDA systems combine data from satellites, coastal radar, patrolling ships and aircraft with reports from human sources; a continuing challenge is tracking vessels that hide or obfuscate their positions or identities. Bueger and Edmunds identify the Maritime Analysis and Operations Centre–Narcotics (MAOC-N) in Lisbon as an issue-specific information-sharing centre facilitating counternarcotics operations in the Atlantic.

=== Legal ===
If various militaries attempt to seize the semi-submersibles in international waters, the crews usually scuttle them. Until 2008, in accordance with international maritime law, the crew was rescued, and, if there was no evidence of wrongdoing, released. To address this loophole, the US Drug Trafficking Vessel Interdiction Act in September 2008 made it a "felony for those who knowingly or intentionally operate or embark in a self-propelled semi-submersible (SPSS) without nationality and that is or ever navigated in international waters, with the intent to evade detection". The penalty is a prison term of up to twenty years in the U.S.

The U.S. law does not apply to flagged vessels (i.e., registered with some officially recognized government). The bill grants extraterritorial jurisdiction over international waters and makes it illegal to lack relevant documents. Instead of an anti-narcotics operation turning into a rescue mission after submarines are sunk, the crew can be detained and interrogated using exigent methods.

In 2009, Congress of Colombia passed a law punishing builders of semi-submersible vessels with up to 12 years in prison, or 14 years if they are used to transport drugs.

Security issues related to "torpedo-style cargo containers", semi-submersible vessels, and submarines were reviewed in an August 2012 article in the U.S. publication Homeland Security Affairs.

== See also ==
- Anti-submarine warfare
- Illegal drug trade
- Illegal drug trade in Colombia
- Merchant submarine
- Mérida Initiative
- Mexican drug war
- Narco tank
- Plan Colombia
- Prohibition of drugs
