= Richard Weber (public servant) =

American police officer

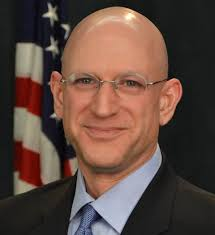

General Counsel New York State Department of Financial Services
- In office May 1, 2020 – April 30, 2022

Chief Internal Revenue Service Criminal Investigation
- In office April 1, 2012 – May 31, 2017
- President: Barack Obama; Donald Trump
- Preceded by: Victor Song
- Succeeded by: Don Fort

Chief Major Economic Crimes Bureau Manhattan District Attorney's Office
- In office March 1, 2010 – March 31, 2012

Personal details
- Education: Stony Brook University (BA); Touro College (JD)

Richard Weber is an American public servant. Weber was the General Counsel of the New York State Department of Financial Services from May 1, 2020 to April 30, 2022. He was the 23rd Chief of Internal Revenue Service, Criminal Investigation (IRS-CI) from April 1, 2012 to May 31, 2017. Weber is currently Partner and Chair of Financial Services Investigations and Enforcement Practice at Haynes and Boone.

== Early life and education ==
A native of New York City, Weber graduated with a Bachelor of Arts in Political Science from the State University of New York at Stony Brook, and a J.D. from Touro Law School.

== Career ==
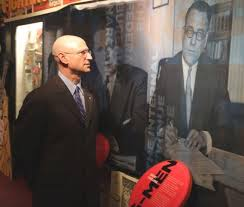
Former Chief Richard Weber Stops To Reflect On The First IRS-CI Chief, Elmer Lincoln Irey

Weber began his public service career as an Assistant U.S. Attorney for the Eastern District of New York from 1995 to 2005. From 2002 to 2003 he was part of the prosecutors who probed the 2003 money laundering case of record label executive Irv Gotti. He then became the Chief, Asset Forfeiture and Money Laundering Section of the U.S. Department of Justice from 2005 to 2010. From 2010 to 2012, Weber was named Deputy Chief, Investigation Division and Chief, Major Economic Crimes Bureau of the Manhattan District Attorney's Office. On April 1, 2012, Weber became the 23rd Chief of Internal Revenue Service, Criminal Investigation (IRS-CI) until his departure in June 2017.

Weber had a stint career in the private sector, working as the Managing Director and Head of Anti-Financial Crime (Americas) for Deutsche Bank from 2017 to 2019 and Managing Director and Head of Financial Crime Prevention (Americas) for UBS Group AG from 2019 to 2020. Weber returned to public service in 2020 when he joined the New York State Department of Financial Services as General Counsel.

== In popular culture ==
The 2020 Amazon Prime Video Chilean drama web television series El Presidente shows Richard Weber, as the IRS-CI Chief, announcing the charges on the individuals involved on the 2015 FIFA corruption case.
