= Homeland Security Task Forces =

Interagency law-enforcement task forces in the United States

- Motto: Integrity, Vigilance, Unity

Agency overview
- Formed: 2025

Jurisdictional structure
- Operations jurisdiction: United States

Website
- www.hstf.gov

Homeland Security Task Forces (HSTFs) are interagency law-enforcement task forces in the United States established in 2025 to investigate and disrupt transnational criminal organizations, human-smuggling networks, cartel operations, weapons trafficking, money laundering, and related cross-border criminal activity. HSTFs combine federal, state, and local law-enforcement agencies to conduct intelligence-driven investigations and regional operations against complex criminal networks.

== History ==
HSTFs were introduced following Executive Order 14159, issued in 2025, which directed the Department of Justice (DOJ) and the Department of Homeland Security (DHS) to establish a nationwide network of task forces to address transnational criminal threats and unlawful cross-border activity. The HSTF concept was rolled out as part of a broader enforcement initiative referred to in government materials as "Operation Take Back America," and early HSTFs were announced in several states and regions in 2025.

== Organization and structure ==
HSTFs are typically co-led by components of DHS, principally Homeland Security Investigations (HSI) and DOJ components such as the Federal Bureau of Investigation (FBI). Participating agencies commonly include enforcement efforts of multiple agencies from several cabinet departments including:

- Department of Justice
  - Bureau of Alcohol, Tobacco, Firearms, and Explosives
  - Drug Enforcement Administration
  - Federal Bureau of Investigation
  - United States Marshals Service
- Department of Homeland Security
  - Immigration and Customs Enforcement
    - Homeland Security Investigations
    - Enforcement and Removal Operations
  - U.S. Coast Guard
  - U.S. Secret Service
  - United States Customs and Border Protection
    - U.S. Border Patrol
    - Office of Field Operations
    - Air and Marine Operations
- Department of the Treasury
  - Internal Revenue Service - Criminal Investigation
- Department of Labor
  - Office of the Inspector General
- Department of State
  - Diplomatic Security Service
- U.S. Postal Service
  - Postal Inspection Service

Each regional HSTF is generally supported by an executive committee or steering group that coordinates multi-agency operations and intelligence sharing.

== Major task forces ==
Several early HSTFs were publicly announced in 2025. Notable examples include the Virginia Homeland Security Task Force (VHSTF), which launched in March 2025 and was described by officials as part of Operation Take Back America, and regional HSTFs in Texas, including units announced for the Houston and South Texas areas.

== Relationship to OCDETF and DOJ reorganization ==
The introduction of HSTFs coincided with a major reorganization within the DOJ during the FY 2026 budget cycle. In DOJ budget materials and related internal memoranda, the long-standing Organized Crime Drug Enforcement Task Forces (OCDETF) program was identified for dissolution as a stand-alone program, with OCDETF resources proposed to be redistributed into the budgets of participating DOJ components. Reporting based on DOJ documents indicated that many OCDETF functions and ongoing cases were to be transferred into newly created HSTFs or absorbed by component offices, reflecting a shift from a DOJ-centered task-force model toward integrated, DHS-and-DOJ multi-agency task forces.

== Reception and criticism ==
The creation of HSTFs and the concurrent redistribution of OCDETF functions prompted debate among lawmakers, prosecutors, and analysts. Supporters argued that HSTFs provide enhanced interagency cooperation, better intelligence fusion, and a unified operational framework to address evolving transnational threats. Critics expressed concern that dissolving OCDETF could erode specialized prosecutorial experience in complex narcotics and financial investigations, risk disruption of long-running cases, and shift prosecutorial authority and priorities toward DHS-led structures. In June 2025, several Democratic senators formally requested that the Attorney General provide information and justification for plans to close OCDETF and explain how ongoing cases and coordination functions would be preserved.

== See also ==
- Organized Crime Drug Enforcement Task Force (OCDETF)
- Homeland Security Investigations (HSI)
- Operation Take Back America
