= 5J =

5J or 5-J may refer to:

- Cebu Pacific (IATA code), a Philippine low-cost airline
- 5J engines, a product of Škoda Fabia
- Secondary State Highway 5J, former name for Washington State Route 702
- Destiny of the Daleks (production code: 5J), a 1979 Doctor Who serial
- Antimonumento 5J, a sculpture in Guadalajara, Mexico

== See also ==
- Q-5J, a model of Nanchang Q-5
- BD-5J, a model of Bede BD-5
- Martin SV-5J, a model of Martin Marietta X-24
- J5 (disambiguation)
