= Organized Crime Drug Enforcement Task Force =

Federal drug enforcement program in the United States

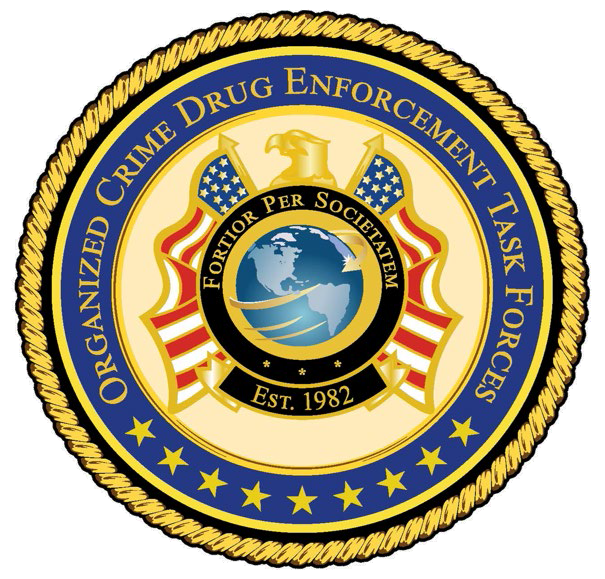
- Motto: Stronger Through Partnership

Agency overview
- Formed: 1982
- Dissolved: 2025
- Superseding agency: Homeland Security Task Forces (HSTFs)
- Employees: 2,464 total, including 1195 Special Agents and 543 Attorneys (Authorized FY2023)
- Annual budget: $550.5 M USD (Authorized FY2023)

Jurisdictional structure
- Operations jurisdiction: United States of America

Operational structure
- Agency executive: Thomas W. Padden, Acting Director

Website
- www.justice.gov/ocdetf/about-ocdetf

The Organized Crime Drug Enforcement Task Forces (OCDETF) was a federal organized crime and drug enforcement program in the United States, overseen by the attorney general and the Department of Justice. Founded in 1982, the principal mission of the OCDETF program was to identify, disrupt, and dismantle the major organized crime and drug trafficking operations and tackle related crimes, such as money laundering, tax and weapon violations, and violent crime, and prosecute those criminal networks primarily responsible for the nation's drug supply. It was disbanded by the Trump administration in 2025.

== History ==
President Reagan's Remarks Against Drug Trafficking and Organized Crime on October 14, 1982

In 1982, responding to concerns about the increasing crack epidemic, President Ronald Reagan intensified the war on drugs.

In January 1982, Reagan designated Vice President George H. W. Bush to lead a cross-agency drug interdiction team called the South Florida Task Force. The impetus was a surge of cocaine and cannabis entering through the Miami region, and the sharp rise in related crime. The operation involved the Drug Enforcement Administration (DEA), Customs Service, the Federal Bureau of Investigation (FBI) and other agencies, and Armed Forces ships and planes. It was called the "most ambitious and expensive drug enforcement operation" in US history. By 1986, the task force had made over 15,000 arrests and seized millions of pounds of drugs. However, law enforcement agents said their impact was minimal, and that cocaine imports had increased. A Bush spokesperson emphasized disrupting smuggling routes rather than seizure quantities as the measure of success According to an agency history by Rudy Giuliani, the task force was a success, while drug smuggling had moved to new ports as evidenced by larger seizures elsewhere.

Desiring a more comprehensive, nationwide attack to reduce the supply of illegal drugs in the US, Reagan announced the formation of the OCDETF Program on October 14, 1982.

These task forces, under the direction of the Attorney General, will work closely with State and local law enforcement officials. Following the south Florida example, they'll utilize the resources of the Federal Government, including the FBI, the DEA, the IRS, the ATF, Immigration and Naturalization Service, United States Marshals Services, the U.S. Customs Service, and the Coast Guard. In addition, in some regions Department of Defense tracking and pursuit capability will be made available.

I believe that these task forces will allow us to mount an intensive and coordinated campaign against international and domestic drug trafficking and other organized criminal enterprises.

— Ronald Reagan, Remarks Announcing Federal Initiatives Against Drug Trafficking and Organized Crime

Organized Crime Drug Enforcement appeared in congressional appropriation legislation as a part of the United States Department of Justice budget with the Further Continuing Appropriations Act, 1983, introduced in December 1982.

In 2025, President Trump proposed changes to the OCDETF program. OCDETF is being dissolved as a stand-alone program in DOJ’s FY-2026 reorganization and budget and DOJ plans to redistribute OCDETF resources into component budgets and to transfer many OCDETF cases/functions into newly created Homeland Security Task Forces (HSTFs).

== Role and responsibilities ==
The OCDETF is the centerpiece of the Attorney General's organized crime and drug supply reduction strategy. It is funded through the annual Interagency Crime and Drug Enforcement (ICDE) appropriation of the Department of Justice. It describes its mission is "to reduce the supply of illegal drugs in the United States and diminish the associated violence and other transnational organized criminal activities, including violent street gangs, that present the greatest threat to public safety as well as economic and national security."

=== Organization ===
The OCDETF consists of an Executive Office, which coordinates the drug enforcement efforts of multiple agencies from several cabinet departments including:

- Department of Justice
  - Bureau of Alcohol, Tobacco, Firearms, and Explosives
  - Drug Enforcement Administration
  - Federal Bureau of Investigation
  - United States Marshals Service
- Department of Homeland Security
  - Immigration and Customs Enforcement
  - U.S. Coast Guard
  - U.S. Secret Service
- Department of the Treasury
  - Internal Revenue Service - Criminal Investigation
- Department of Labor
  - Office of the Inspector General
- Department of State
  - Diplomatic Security Service
- U.S. Postal Service
  - Postal Inspection Service

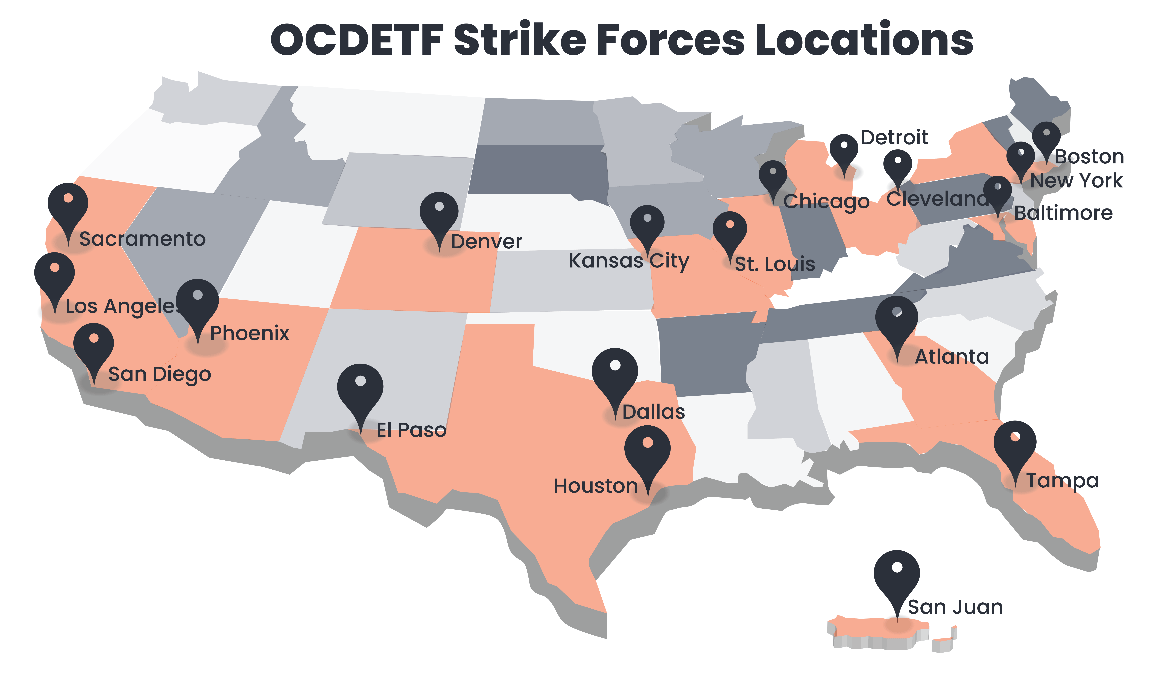
Map of OCDETF Strike Force locations

Enforcement efforts are conducted through the DOJ Criminal Division; the 94 United States Attorneys Offices; and other Federal, State, local, tribal, and international law enforcement agencies.

Geographically, the OCDETF is organized into nine regions, each with its own Advisory Council and Coordination Group. These groups set policies and priorities for their regions and conduct final review of cases proposed for OCDETF designation. At the district level, District Coordination Groups review cases proposed for OCDETF designation, ensure appropriate resource allocation, and monitor local case progress.

==== Regions ====
Each of the ninety-three federal judicial districts is placed into one of nine OCDETF regions based on geographic proximity. Within each region, a "core city" was designated.

Task Force Region	Core City
New England	Boston
New York/New Jersey	New York City
Mid-Atlantic	Baltimore
Great Lakes	Chicago
Southeast	Atlanta
West Central	St. Louis
Florida/Caribbean	Miami
Southwest	Houston
Pacific	San Francisco

=== Targeting through CPOT and RPOT ===
The OCDETF manages the semi-annual formulation of the Attorney General's Consolidated Priority Organization Target (CPOT) List, a multi-agency target list of "command and control" elements of the most prolific international drug trafficking and money laundering organizations nationally. The OCDETF also requires its participants to identify major Regional Priority Organization Targets (RPOT) as part of an annual Regional Strategic Plan process.

=== The OCDETF Fusion Center and The International Organized Crime Intelligence and Operations Center ===
Established by the Organized Crime Drug Enforcement Task Forces (OCDETF) Program in 2004, the OCDETF Fusion Center (OFC) is a multi-agency intelligence center designed to provide intelligence information to investigations and prosecutions focused on disrupting and dismantling drug trafficking and money laundering organizations.

In May 2009, DOJ established the International Organized Crime Intelligence and Operations Center (IOC-2) to marshal the resources and information of federal law enforcement agencies and prosecutors to collectively combat the threats posed by international criminal organizations. In recognition of the demonstrated interrelationship between criminal organizations that engage in illicit drug trafficking and those that engage in international organized crime involving a broader range of criminal activity, the IOC-2 works in close partnership with the OFC and the Drug Enforcement Administration’s Special Operations Division (a member of the United States Intelligence Community). The IOC-2 is co-located with the OFC and shares access to the OFC’s database. Its products are indistinguishable from OFC products except that they focus on targets under investigation for a broader variety of criminal activity than just illicit drug trafficking. In 2011, IOC-2 was placed under the OCDETF Executive Office for coordinated management and resourcing.

== Milestones ==
From the formation of the organization to 2006, OCDETF operations have led to more than 44,000 drug-related convictions and the seizure of over $3 billion in monetary and property assets.

The United States Department of Justice Criminal Division's s Office of Enforcement Operations reviews DOJ components' Title III wiretap applications. In the three year span of calendar years 2016, 2017, and 2018 there were 6,964 OCDETF-related Title III applications.

=== Investigations and prosecutions ===
In budget materials submitted to Congress, the OCDETF has provided measurements of its Investigation and prosecution statistics.

Performance Measures to Congress
Measure	FY 2018	FY 2019	FY 2020	FY 2021
Active investigations	4,685	4,822	5,076	4,910
New investigations initiated	956	947	888	837
Defendants Indicted	9,756	10,308	8,149	8,293
Defendants convicted	7,611	8,082	5,981	5,778

== See also ==
- Drug Enforcement Administration
- Federal Bureau of Investigation
- Alcohol, Tobacco and Firearms
- IRS Criminal Investigation
- Operation Panama Express
