= Operation Panama Express =

Operation Panama Express is a long-running Organized Crime Drug Enforcement Task Force (OCDETF), comprising participants from the Coast Guard Investigative Service, the Federal Bureau of Investigation, Immigration and Customs Enforcement Homeland Security Investigations, the Drug Enforcement Administration, and the United States Attorney's Office for the Middle District of Florida.

According to a March 2006 Congressional testimony by DEA Chief of Operations Michael Braun, Operation Panama Express has resulted in the seizure of 350 metric tons (392 tons) of cocaine, and the arrests of 1,107 individuals. The OCDETF is based in Tampa, Florida, and focuses primarily on interrupting cocaine shipments en route from South America—especially Colombia.

On September 13, 2008, the U.S. Coast Guard captured a narco submarine carrying approximately seven tons of cocaine, located about 563 kilometres (350 mi) west of Guatemala. The 59-foot-long, steel and fiberglass craft was detected by a U.S. Navy aircraft as part of Operation Panama Express.

== Joaquin Mario Valencia-Trujillo ==
The most notable individual arrested as a result of Operation Panama Express is Colombian Cali cartel kingpin Joaquin Mario Valencia-Trujillo. Valencia was arrested on January 31, 2003 in Bogotá, Colombia, and extradited in 2004 to the United States. The lead witness in Valencia's trial was Jose Castrillon-Henao, a former Cali cartel maritime smuggling chief who became an FBI informant in 1999. Valencia was sentenced to a prison term of 40 years, and ordered to forfeit $110 million.
