= Fender J5 Telecaster =

Electric guitar

J5 Telecaster
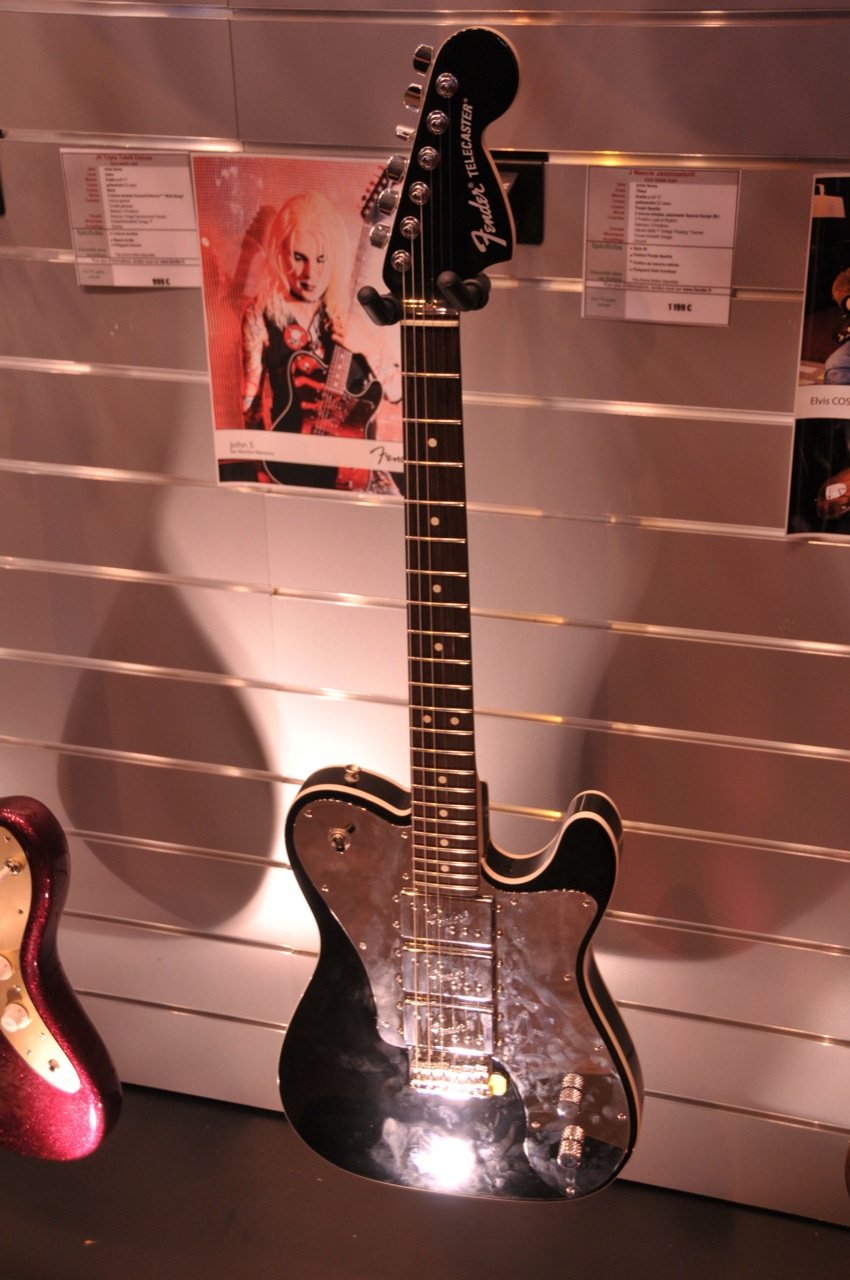
- Fender J5 Triple Tele Deluxe
- Manufacturer: Fender
- Period: 2004-present

Construction
- Body type: Solid
- Neck joint: Bolt on

Woods
- Body: Ash, Alder
- Neck: Maple
- Fretboard: Rosewood

Hardware
- Bridge: Fixed, Synchronized tremolo
- Pickup(s): 1 single coil and 1 humbucker, dual humbuckers, or 3 humbuckers

Colors available
- Black

The Fender J5 Telecaster is John 5's signature model Telecaster, and was designed in part by John 5 himself. The prototype built by Fender Custom Shop Artist Relations representative Alex Perez has served as John 5's main guitar since around 2003. The standard features that differentiate John 5's Telecasters from the traditional Telecaster design include dual volume controls instead of both a volume and tone control, a three-way toggle switch mounted through the upper bout, chrome pickguard, and a specially shaped headstock.

== Variants ==
Throughout the years there have been several versions of the J5 Tele, these include:

=== Custom Shop Models ===
Made at the Fender Custom Shop in Corona, California, USA.

- J5:HB Signature Telecaster, outfitted with a fixed Telecaster bridge, a Fender Custom Shop Twisted Tele pickup in the neck position, and a Fender USA Enforcer pickup in the bridge position. The body has white binding on the top and back.
- J5 Bigsby Signature Telecaster, outfitted with a Bigsby vibrato tailpiece, a Fender Custom Shop Twisted Tele pickup in the neck position, and a Seymour Duncan Hot Rails humbucking pickup in the bridge position. The body has white binding on the top and back. This model also has a three-way blade style switch on the control plate instead of the usual three-way toggle.

=== Artist Series Models ===
Made in Ensenada, Baja California, Mexico.

- J5 Signature Telecaster, outfitted with a fixed Telecaster bridge, a Fender Custom Shop Twisted Tele pickup in the neck position, and a Fender USA Enforcer pickup in the bridge position. The top of the guitar has white binding while the back is unbound.
- J5 Triple Tele Deluxe, outfitted with a Fender synchronized tremolo and three Fender USA Enforcer pickups. The body has white binding on the top and back, as well as a '70s style Stratocaster headstock.

=== Squier Model ===
Made in China under the Squier brand as a more budget conscious variant.

- J5 Signature Telecaster, outfitted with a fixed Telecaster bridge, a custom Alnico V humbucker in the neck position, and a custom ceramic humbucker in the bridge position. This variant has an alder body with white binding on the top and back and a standard Telecaster headstock.
- Available in Black with chrome hardware and Frost Gold with gold hardware.
