= Joint Chiefs of Global Tax Enforcement =

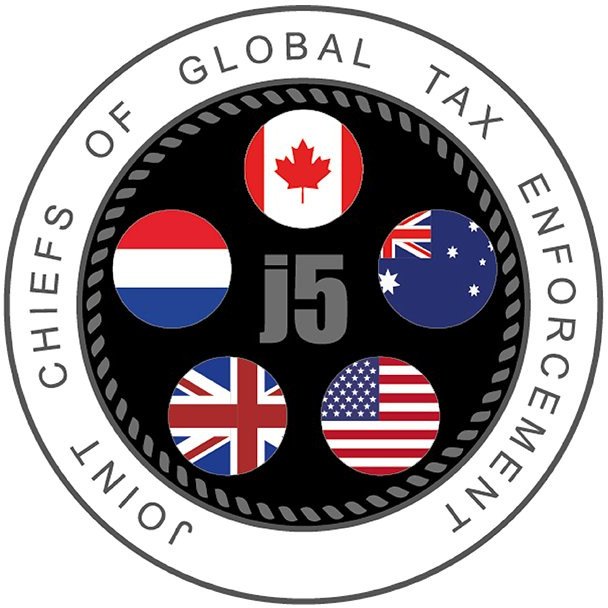
- Abbreviation: J5
- Formation: 2018
- Type: Intergovernmental organization
- Members: Criminal intelligence communities from: Australia; Canada; Netherlands; United Kingdom; United States
- Website: www.irs.gov/J5

The Joint Chiefs of Global Tax Enforcement (J5) is a global joint operational group, formed in mid-2018 to combat transnational tax crime. Composed of the Australian Taxation Office (ATO), the Canada Revenue Agency (CRA), the Dutch Fiscale Inlichtingen- en Opsporingsdienst (FIOD), the British His Majesty's Revenue and Customs (HMRC), and the American IRS Criminal Investigation (IRS-CI), the J5 members work together to gather information, share intelligence, conduct operations and build the capacity of tax crime enforcement officials.

== History ==
Following the 2016 Panama Papers and 2017 Paradise Papers data leaks, taxation and law enforcement agencies in the United States, Canada, Australia, New Zealand, the United Kingdom and the Netherlands formed the Ottawa Group, to share information and coordinate response actions. In 2018, the Ottawa Group was re-organized as the J5, consisting of criminal intelligence communities from Australia, Canada, the Netherlands, the United Kingdom and the United States who are committed to collaboration in the fight against international and transnational tax crime and money laundering. The J5 was formed in response to a call to action from the Organisation for Economic Co-operation and Development (OECD) for countries to do more to tackle the enablers of tax crimes.

== Role and responsibilities ==
The members are convinced that offshore structures and financial instruments, where used to commit tax crime and money laundering, are detrimental to the economic, fiscal, and social interests of their countries. Specific duties include:

- Work together to investigate those who enable transnational tax crime and money laundering and those who benefit from it
- Collaborate internationally to reduce the growing threat to tax administrations posed by cryptocurrencies and cybercrime and to make the most of data and technology
- Develop shared strategies to gather information and intelligence
- Drive strategies and procedures to conduct joint investigations

Additionally, members also collaborate internationally to reduce the growing threat to tax administrations posed by cryptocurrencies and cybercrime and to make the most of data and technology.

== Milestones ==
On 5 June 2019, leaders from the J5 member countries met in Washington, DC to mark the one-year anniversary of J5 and announce the results from its first year. Among its more than 50 investigations involving sophisticated international enablers of tax evasion, the most important investigation during its first year involved a global financial institution and its intermediaries who facilitate taxpayers to hide their income and assets.

On 13 July 2020, the organization marked its second anniversary through a virtual meeting to announce that hundreds of data exchanges between J5 partner agencies have occurred with more data being exchanged in the past year than the previous 10 years combined.

== Current members ==
The current J5 members are:

- Australian Taxation Office (ATO) – Australia
- Canada Revenue Agency (CRA) – Canada
- Fiscale Inlichtingen- en Opsporingsdienst (FIOD) – Netherlands
- His Majesty's Revenue and Customs (HMRC) – United Kingdom
- Internal Revenue Service, Criminal Investigation (IRS-CI) – United States of America

== See also ==
- Computer forensics
- Cryptocurrency and security
- Federal crime
- Fraud
- Surveillance
- Tax evasion
- Undercover operation
- White-collar crime
