= Elmer Lincoln Irey =

First chief of the US IRS, from 1919 to 1943

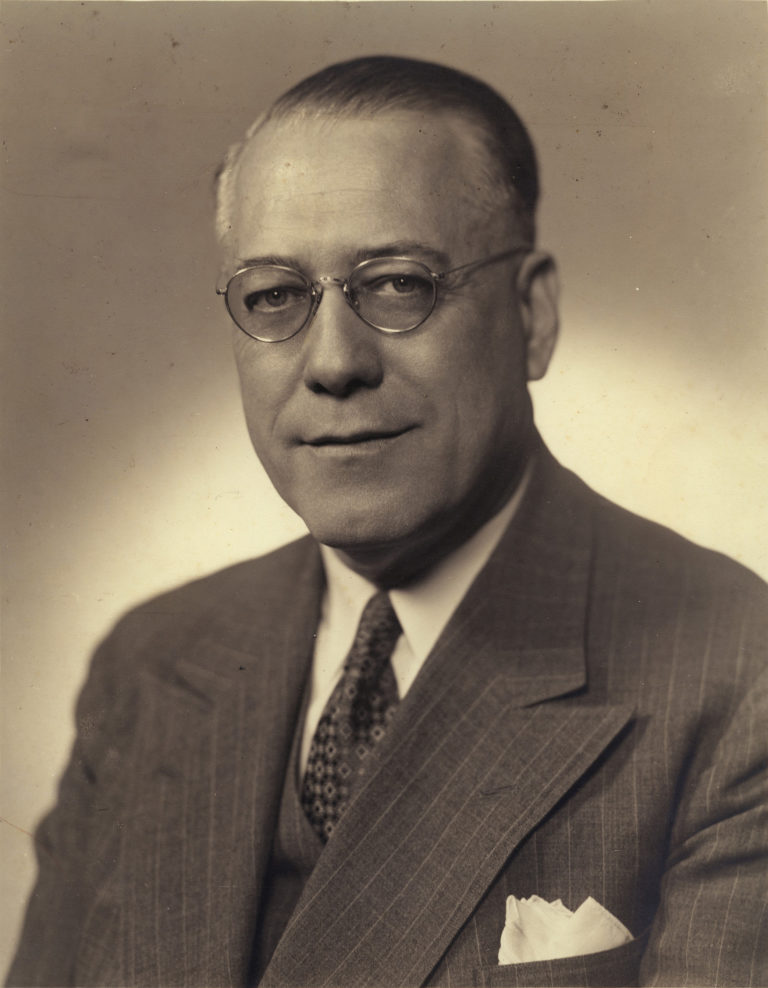

Chief Internal Revenue Service Intelligence Unit
- In office July 1, 1919 – January 26, 1943
- President: Woodrow Wilson; Warren G. Harding; Calvin Coolidge; Herbert Hoover; Franklin D. Roosevelt
- Preceded by: Position established
- Succeeded by: William H. Woolf

Personal details
- Born: March 10, 1888 Kansas City, Missouri, U.S.
- Died: July 19, 1948 (aged 60) Shady Side, Maryland, U.S.
- Education: Georgetown Law School; Bachelor of Laws

Elmer Lincoln Irey (March 10, 1888 – July 19, 1948) was a Postal Inspector, United States Treasury Department official and the first Chief of the Internal Revenue Service Intelligence Unit, that would later become Internal Revenue Service, Criminal Investigation (IRS-CI). Irey led the investigative unit during the federal tax evasion prosecution of Chicago mobster Al Capone.

== Early life and education ==
A native of Kansas City, Missouri, Irey moved to Washington, D.C., at a very young age where he obtained his education. He graduated from Business High School in 1906 and eventually graduated with a law degree from Georgetown Law School before beginning his career in public service.

== Career ==
Irey began a 40-year career in public service in 1909 as a clerk for the Chief Postal Inspector. He soon became a Postal Inspector himself, and served in that role until 1919, when he was appointed Chief of the Treasury Department's Internal Revenue Service Intelligence Unit.

On July 1, 1919, the Commissioner of Internal Revenue, Daniel C. Roper created the Intelligence Unit to investigate widespread allegations of tax fraud. To establish the Intelligence Unit, six United States Post Office Inspectors were transferred to the Bureau of Internal Revenue to become the first special agents in charge of the organization that would one day become Criminal Investigation. Among the first six, Elmer Lincoln Irey was designated as the Chief of the new unit. Hugh McQuillan, Arthur A. Nichols, Frank Frayser, Everett Partridge and Herbert E. Lucas were the other five that made up the new unit.

On October 6, 1919, Irey brought in William H. Woolf from the Office of the Chief Postal Inspector in Washington as his Assistant Chief. They formed the nucleus that became the Intelligence Unit. In that role, Irey formed one of the most successful investigative teams in the history of American law enforcement with agent Frank J. Wilson leading the hundred-man unit of "T-men" in a three-year investigation against Capone's criminal organization the "Chicago Outfit". Despite attempted jury tampering and death threats against Wilson, Irey's investigation succeeded in the conviction of Capone for tax evasion in 1931.

During the Lindbergh kidnapping, some sources indicate that Irey insisted on tracking the serial numbers on the gold certificates used as ransom money (which ultimately led to the arrest and conviction of Bruno Richard Hauptmann). Other sources credit James W. Wilson.

Irey's "T-men" unit prosecuted over 15,000 people for tax evasion (with a 90% conviction rate), including Louisiana Gov. Huey Long and Chicago businessman Moses Annenberg, over the course of 27 years.

Named chief coordinator of all the Treasury Department's law enforcement agencies in 1937, Irey oversaw the operations of the U.S. Secret Service, the IRS Intelligence Unit, U.S. Customs, the Bureau of Narcotics, the Alcohol Tax Unit (predecessor to ATF), and the U.S. Coast Guard, until his retirement in 1941.

== Autobiography ==
He wrote his autobiography, "Tax Dodgers" in 1942. He relates stories of how President Franklin D. Roosevelt (FDR) used the IRS to attack his political enemies. One was Andrew Mellon, who was Secretary of the Treasury during previous Republican administrations. Mellon was found innocent of all charges.

IRS agents under Irey began investigating Louisiana Governor and later Senator Huey Long during Hoover administration but suspended the investigation following the election of Franklin Roosevelt. After several months awaiting guidance from the new administration, Irey received a go-ahead to restart the investigation from Treasury Secretary Henry Morgenthau Jr. In his biography, Irey related the personal interest and direct intervention of FDR in the investigation of Long, another of his political enemies who was considering running for president against Roosevelt in 1936. Several of Long's cronies were convicted, but Long was assassinated in 1935 just weeks before U.S. Attorney Dan Moody planned to present evidence against him to a federal grand jury.

Another memoir of the IRS being used as a political weapon was written by Elmer Lynn Williams, which described the attack on William Malone, a Republican who ran for governor of Illinois.

Irey appears in the opening scene of the 1947 semidocumentary film T-Men, starring Dennis O'Keefe, explaining to the audience how the various enforcement agencies of the Treasury Department work together on the case they are about to see.

Although he was very involved in his work, Elmer Irey enjoyed the outdoors very much, and loved to watch his two sons race sailboats on the West River. This was watched from the lawn of the family home in Shady Side. His close relatives helped found a sailing club now known as "West River Sailing Club". The tradition of sailing at this club continues today with his great, great-grandchildren.

He has been the longest serving Chief of IRS-CI, with 23 years, 209 days in office. He died on July 19, 1948.
