= Charles E. Apgar =

American amateur radio operator

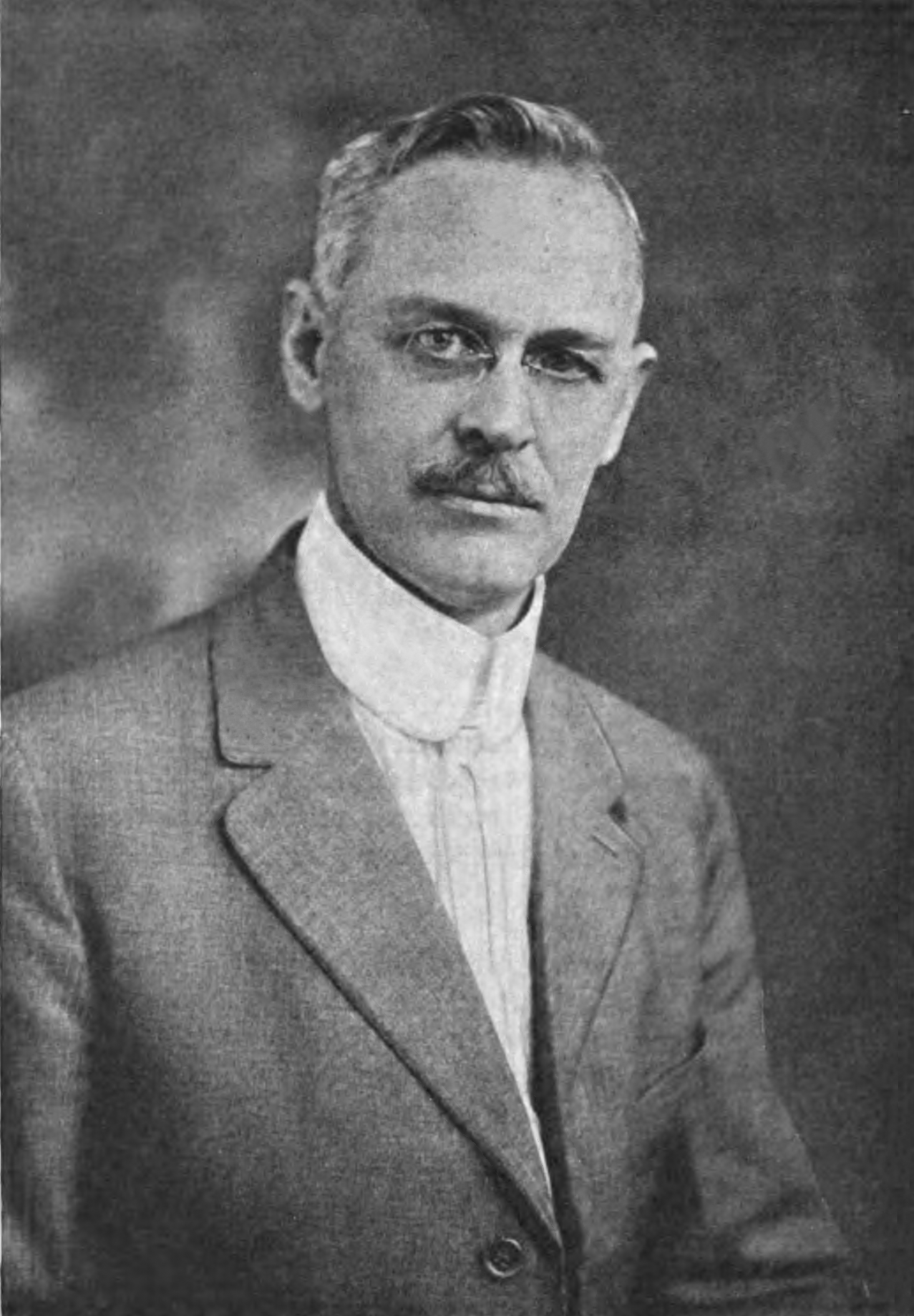
- Born: June 28, 1865; Gladstone, New Jersey, US
- Died: August 17, 1950 (aged 85); Westfield, New Jersey, US
- Resting place: Fairview Cemetery & Arboretum; 40.666252°N 74.330578°W
- Siglum: Chas. E. Apgar
- Spouse: Helen May Clarke
- Children: 3, including Virginia
- Call sign: 2MM

Charles Emory Apgar (June 28, 1865 – August 17, 1950) was an American business executive and amateur radio operator. He is known for making early recordings of radio transmissions at the start of World War I. The recordings that he made of a wireless telegraphy station owned by a German Empire-based company operating from the United States were used to expose an espionage ring. They provided evidence of clandestine messages being sent in violation of a prohibition intended to maintain United States neutrality. This proof of illicit operation led to the government seizing control of the facility to stop the activity. Apgar's efforts received extensive coverage in newspapers and technical science magazines at the time. His contributions were praised by government investigators. Publications continued to remark on his work many years later.

== Biography ==
Apgar was born in Gladstone, New Jersey on June 28, 1865. He was a student at Centenary Collegiate Institute in 1880. (Note: Before 1910 it was a coeducational preparatory school.) He attended Wesleyan University in 1887–88 though he never graduated. He then married Helen May Clarke and they had three children: Charles Emory Apgar Jr., who died at a young age; Lawrence C. Apgar, who became a professor of music; and Dr. Virginia Apgar, who was a pioneer in obstetrics and neonatology. They owned a suburban home in residential Westfield, New Jersey, 20 miles (32 km) from New York City.

Apgar was a member of the Methodist Episcopal Church in Westfield. He became a Master Mason at a Freemasonry lodge in 1906. He worked as a business executive in a variety of positions for New York Life Insurance Company and later for the brokerage firm Spencer Trask & Co. In 1915, during the time when his recordings gained notoriety, he was employed as a salesman for Haynes Automobile Company. He was also an amateur astronomer whose calculations of the motions of Jupiter's satellites were regularly published in the Journal of the Royal Astronomical Society of Canada. He died in Westfield at the age of 85.

== Amateur radio ==
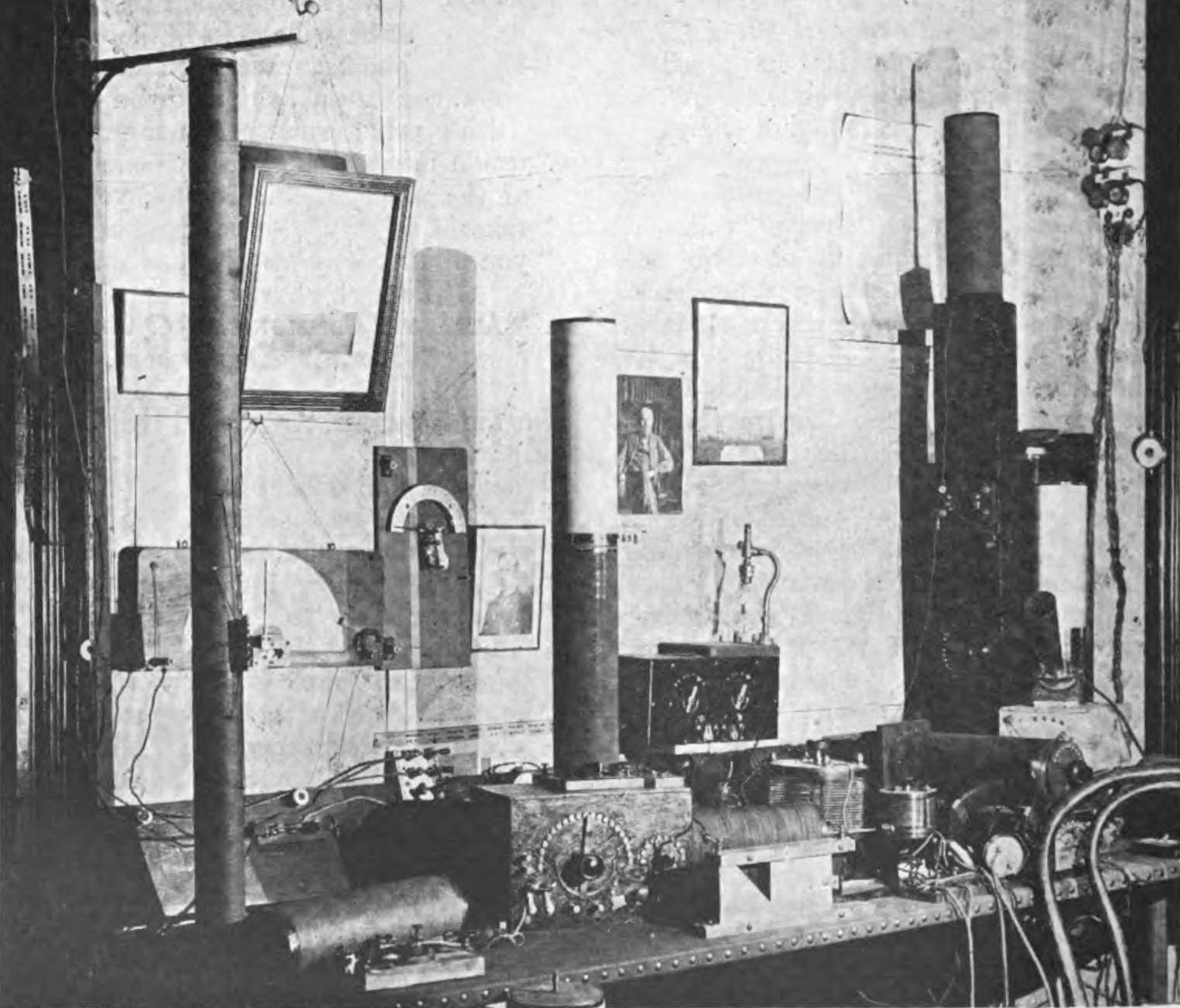
The station at his home including equipment that he built.

Apgar became interested in wireless telegraphy after reading about an amateur who had heard election returns transmitted by a newspaper on election night (i.e. before the results could be widely distributed the following morning). He built his first "home-made" wireless telegraphy equipment on December 11, 1910 – one month after the election. He listened to news bulletins from the New York Herald station OHX in Manhattan. The station had been created to send news to approaching ocean liners and receive reports about their voyage.

After the passage of the Radio Act of 1912, he was licensed to use the call sign 2MM from 1913 to 1915. At the experimental wireless station inside his home in Westfield he operated a 450 watt amateur station. The equipment he constructed could use a wavelength of 8,000 metres (37 kHz) during an era when few amateurs went beyond 600 metres (500 kHz). It was described as a "high-grade plant" of "extraordinary efficiency." In April 1913 he became an associate member of the recently founded Institute of Radio Engineers. He was an early participant in the American Radio Relay League (ARRL) by October 1913. He soon began publishing descriptions of wireless equipment that he had designed in technical magazines.

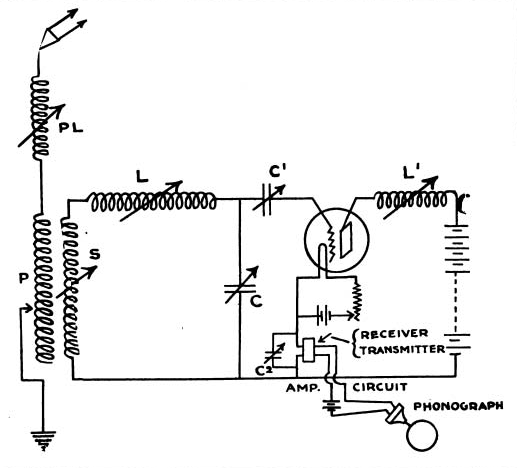
Circuit diagram of his station connected to a phonograph recorder.

He built equipment that could greatly amplify the sound from his radio receiver. Connected to a device that he called a "loud talker-horn" (an early type of loudspeaker) it could be heard 600 feet (180 m) away. An editor of a magazine was so impressed that he enthusiastically described it as "one of the greatest feats ever produced by any amateur..." Apgar also devised a method to record the signals from stations that he listened to. His accounts of the equipment he used to make the recordings were featured in magazines such as The Wireless Age and Electrical Experimenter. His recordings were colloquially referred to as "canned messages."

=== Wireless recordings ===
Apgar's equipment was mostly homemade with the exception of the headphones and of an improved Audion designed by Edwin Howard Armstrong that was part of the circuit used to detect and amplify the signal. It was connected to a Dictaphone which allowed him to record Morse code transmissions on wax cylinders made by Edison Manufacturing Company. His first recording was made October 12, 1913, of the New York Herald station, which by this time was using the call sign WHB. (Note: A different station in Kansas City, Missouri, was licensed to broadcast as WHB starting in the early 1920s.) By October 1914, he had recorded other transmissions including the United States Navy station NAA sending time signals.

=== Sayville station ===
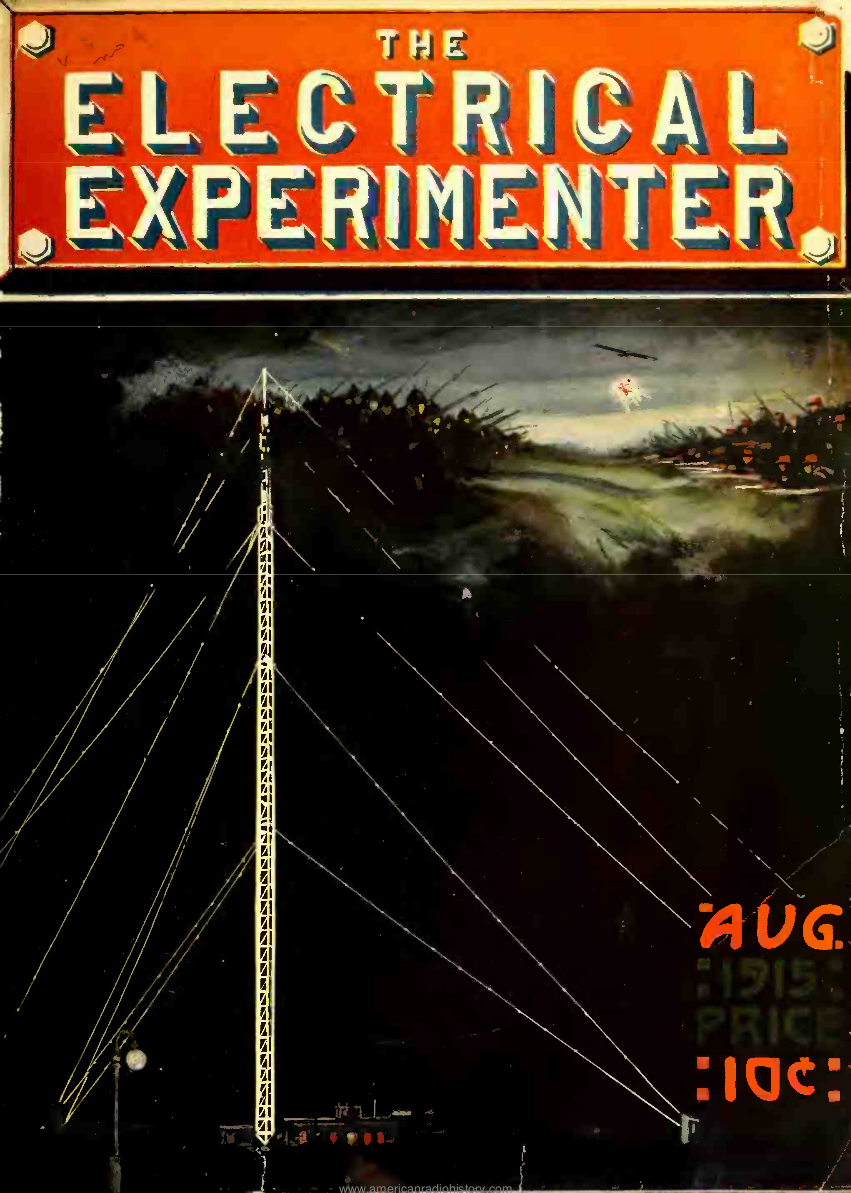
Painting on the cover of the August 1915 issue of The Electrical Experimenter titled Sayville (N. Y.) Wireless Receiving German War Report.

Apgar then became interested in wireless station WSL in Sayville, New York, on the coast of Long Island. In the evenings, he spent time tuning his radio to the messages sent by Sayville to other stations, a practice known as "listening in." It was a high power commercial station designed for long-distance communication. The station was operated by the Atlantic Communications Company which was primarily owned by the German company Telefunken. The station was built to establish two-way communication with the Nauen Transmitter Station POZ in Europe which was jointly owned by the Imperial German Army and Imperial Mail. Nauen was the only station in Europe capable of transmitting to North America at the time. It was mostly sending news that Sayville received and distributed by landline telegraph to American wire services.

During construction in August 1912, the US Navy began observing Sayville because it was reportedly controlled by a company that was under the influence of the government of the German Empire. The company claimed that it had no such connection. It had become operational in July 1913. These were the first regular transmissions between the United States and Germany. The equipment that Apgar built was sensitive enough that he also often clearly heard the Nauen station that was 4,000 miles (6,400 km) distant. Apgar listened to Sayville and made his first recordings of it in November 1913. In February 1914, Apgar sent some of these cylinder recordings to the operators of Sayville, at their request.

At the start of World War I, the United States declared that it was neutral in the conflict. In August 1914, President Woodrow Wilson issued an executive order that prohibited radio communication of an "unneutral nature" from United States territory. Any communication that could aid military activities would have jeopardized neutrality. This was due to an article in the Hague Convention that stated: "belligerents are forbidden to erect on the territory of a neutral power a wireless telegraphy station or other apparatus for the purpose of communicating with belligerent forces on land or sea." The US Navy stationed personnel at the facility to inspect the messages before they were sent and enforce the order if needed. Sayville was considered one of the three most important stations to which this order applied.

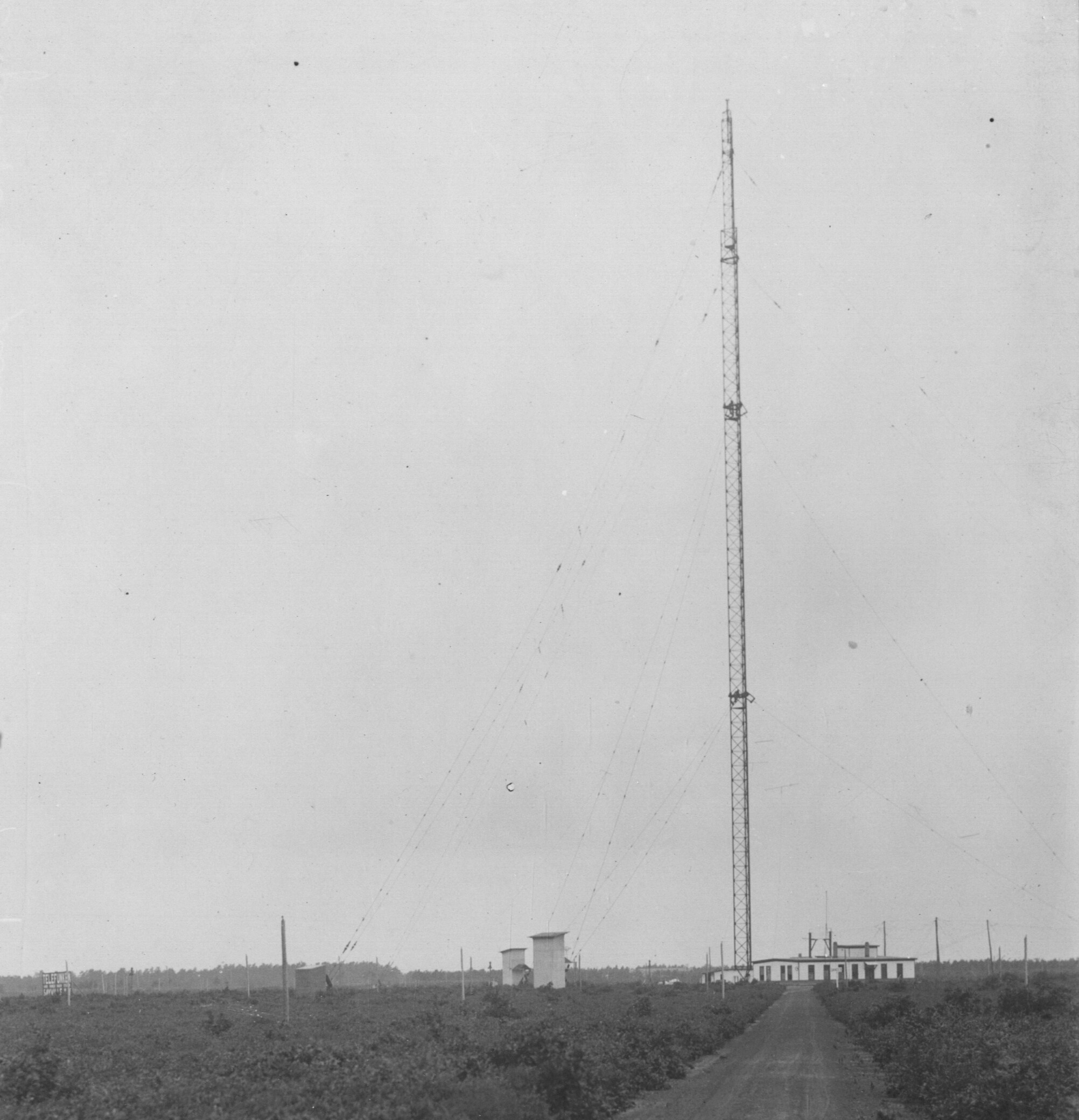
Sayville wireless station and umbrella antenna, 1915.

During the war the German transatlantic telegraph cable was intentionally cut by the British which resulted in the German embassy becoming heavily reliant on the new wireless station. The summer residence of German ambassador Johann Heinrich von Bernstorff in Cedarhurst, New York, on Long Island had a direct telegraph line to Sayville to relay diplomatic communication to Germany by wireless. The US Navy began to have doubts about the legitimate operation of the station after they learned that a technical advisor there, physicist and engineer Jonathan Zenneck, was a captain in the German marines. The station was soon suspected of violating the presidential prohibition by including secret messages despite the government censorship.

During the summer months, reception of wireless signals was difficult due to adverse atmospheric conditions that increased static. Long-distance communication was possible only during the night for brief intervals. To alleviate this limitation Sayville "quietly" (such that only a few government officials were aware of it) made major improvements to its equipment. In April 1915, the transmitter was upgraded from 35 to 100 kilowatts and three 492-foot (150 m) tall antenna towers were installed, transforming it into one of the most powerful transatlantic stations in this part of the world. By May the Telefunken station at Sayville and another at Tuckerton, New Jersey, were accused of sending messages to a German U-boat providing information that allowed the submarine to "ambush" and sink the RMS Lusitania. This led to greater scrutiny of activity at the station.

=== Investigation ===
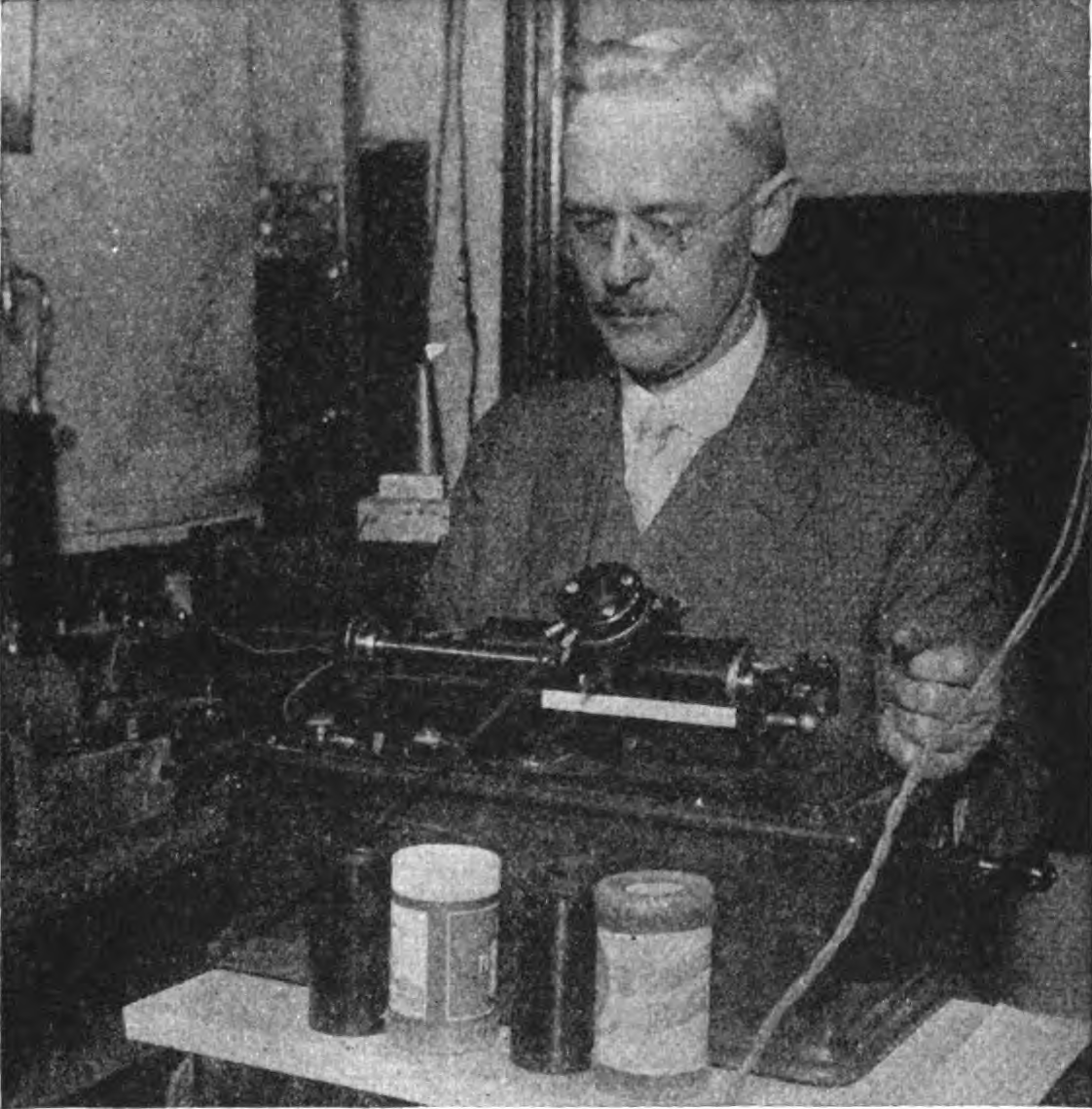
Apgar producing "canned" wireless messages on his recorder, 1915.

Apgar noticed the peculiar messages sent from Sayville. He informed an inspector from the Department of Commerce Radio Bureau about the odd messages and his recordings of them. Apgar knew L. R. Krumm, Chief Radio Inspector for the Port of New York and New Jersey, and the inspector had been aware of his recordings for some time. Krumm visited Apgar to examine his apparatus and witness a demonstration. Krumm then alerted the United States Secret Service and suggested that they contact Apgar. At the request of William J. Flynn, Chief of the Secret Service, Apgar commenced making regular recordings of the station on June 7, 1915. This continued every night for two weeks. He alternated between two cylinder recorders to ensure uninterrupted capturing of the messages while he replaced a full cylinder with a new blank one. During this time he made 11 hours of permanent recordings that captured 25,000 words transmitted by the station. Apgar was paid for this work by the government through Flynn.

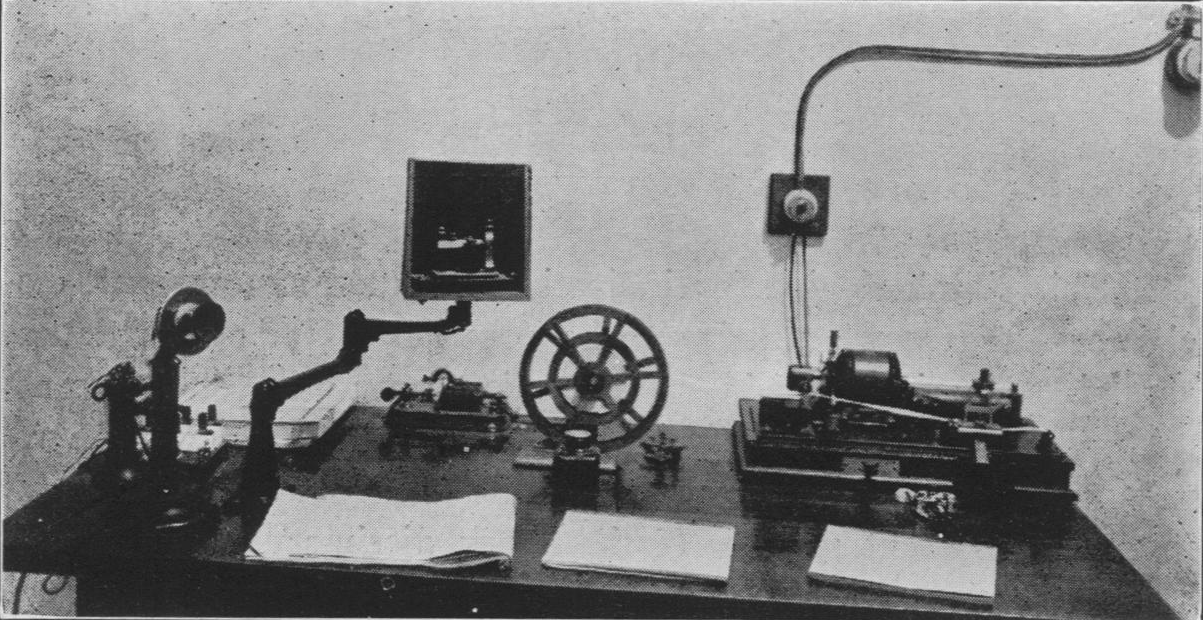
The "perforator apparatus" used at Sayville to punch Morse code on paper tape.

The original messages, approved by government censors, were suspected to contain subsequently altered Morse code that could be used as a cipher. The Sayville station was equipped with a type of Wheatstone system that used perforated paper tape to automatically key the transmitter. An operator produced the tape containing the message before sending. The tape was then run through the transmitter control equipment at a high speed. It operated at 150 wpm (words per minute), significantly faster than the 50 wpm that a highly skilled operator could send manually. The transmissions were so rapid that it made the messages unintelligible to a listener. It was a "meaningless, musical hum or buzz which puzzled all hearers" and sounded like a "titanic bumblebee." Apgar transcribed the previous night's recording each morning by playing the wax cylinder on a phonograph at a much slower speed. He would then telephone the Secret Service to file a report about the transmissions. He made 175 recordings of these suspicious messages, each cylinder containing 4 minutes of transmission time. In addition to his daily reports he turned over the original cylinder recordings to government investigators.

The messages from Sayville were then discussed by the Cabinet of the United States. The recordings proved that the suspected covert messages were present within the approved transmissions. Apgar's "canned" messages are credited with establishing the truth about the Sayville station's activity, though the exact nature of the messages on the recordings remained an official secret. This evidence led to Wilson ordering the US Navy to seize the facility on July 8, 1915. The seizure caused consternation among officers in the Imperial German Navy. The US Navy operated the station in trust to send commercial messages for the duration of the war.

=== Encoded messages ===
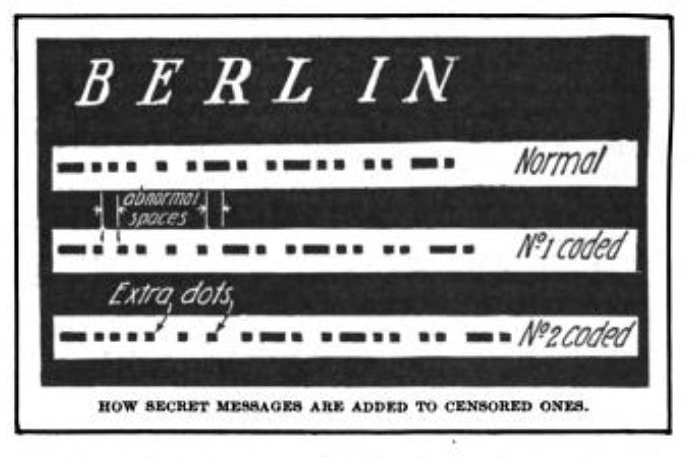
"The above 'code' diagram shows how secret cipher messages could be interspersed through regular messages." In example "N^{o} 2" the Morse code for the letter "B" has been changed to "6E" by adding two extra dots.

After listening to the recordings it took the Secret Service four months to decode the hidden messages. A covert message interspersed with the censor approved text might include the addition of "5-8-K-14-B" for example. This would direct the recipient to the fifth and eighth words on page 11, and the fourteenth word on page 2, of a rare edition of a German dictionary.

A variety of alternate methods of encoding were used. For long-distance communication in this era it was standard practice to employ repetition to ensure successful reception. The message "Pr 3." would be sent "Pr 3. Pr 3." for example. The Sayville transmissions varied this practice by sometimes sending "Pr Pr 3 Pr. 3." – a significant variation that a casual listener might overlook. These were alleged to be a key to an acrostic code.

Other methods of obfuscation included using innocuous English or American sounding fictitious names such as "Frederick Chappell" to refer to the German submarine Deutschland or "Theodore Hooper" as a code name to refer to Capt. von Papen, the German military attaché in Washington, DC. The phrase "Expect father to-morrow" would be interpreted as "The political situation between America and Germany grows worse. It is imperative that you take care of your New York affairs." These names and phrases were concealed in communications that masqueraded as commercial messages. Copies of these were provided to the government by the Providence Journal which accused the German Embassy of revealing secret information about the movements of the allied navy fleet. The headline of the story was subtitled: "Ambassador Breaks Pledges and with Captain Boy-Ed Has Tricked United States Authorities for Months." In 2004, that same newspaper reported that much of John R. Rathom's reporting was a fraud: "In truth, the Providence Journal had acquired numerous inside scoops on German activities, mostly from British intelligence sources who used Rathom to plant anti-German stories in the American media."

=== Significance and legacy ===
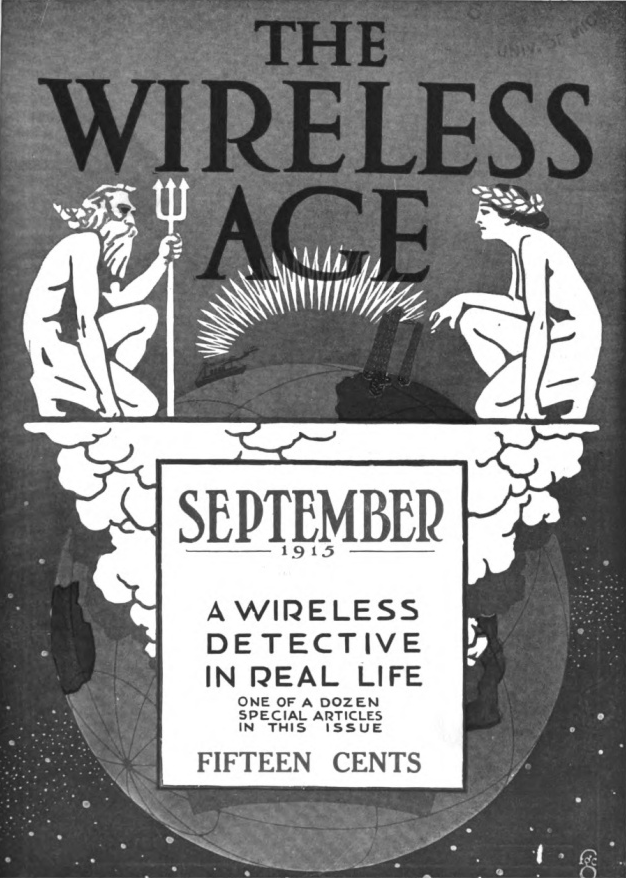
Cover story about Apgar in The Wireless Age, September 1915.

Hiram Percy Maxim has noted that he and other amateurs also noticed these messages: "Apgar, the old sleuth, smelled something just about the time the rest of us did." Flynn describes the importance of Apgar's contributions to the government seizure: "It was really his absolutely faithful records of all of the signals sent out from Sayville that caused the United States to seize the famous station." Extensive coverage in the media in 1915 included a magazine cover story about Apgar that referred to him as "A Wireless Detective in Real Life."

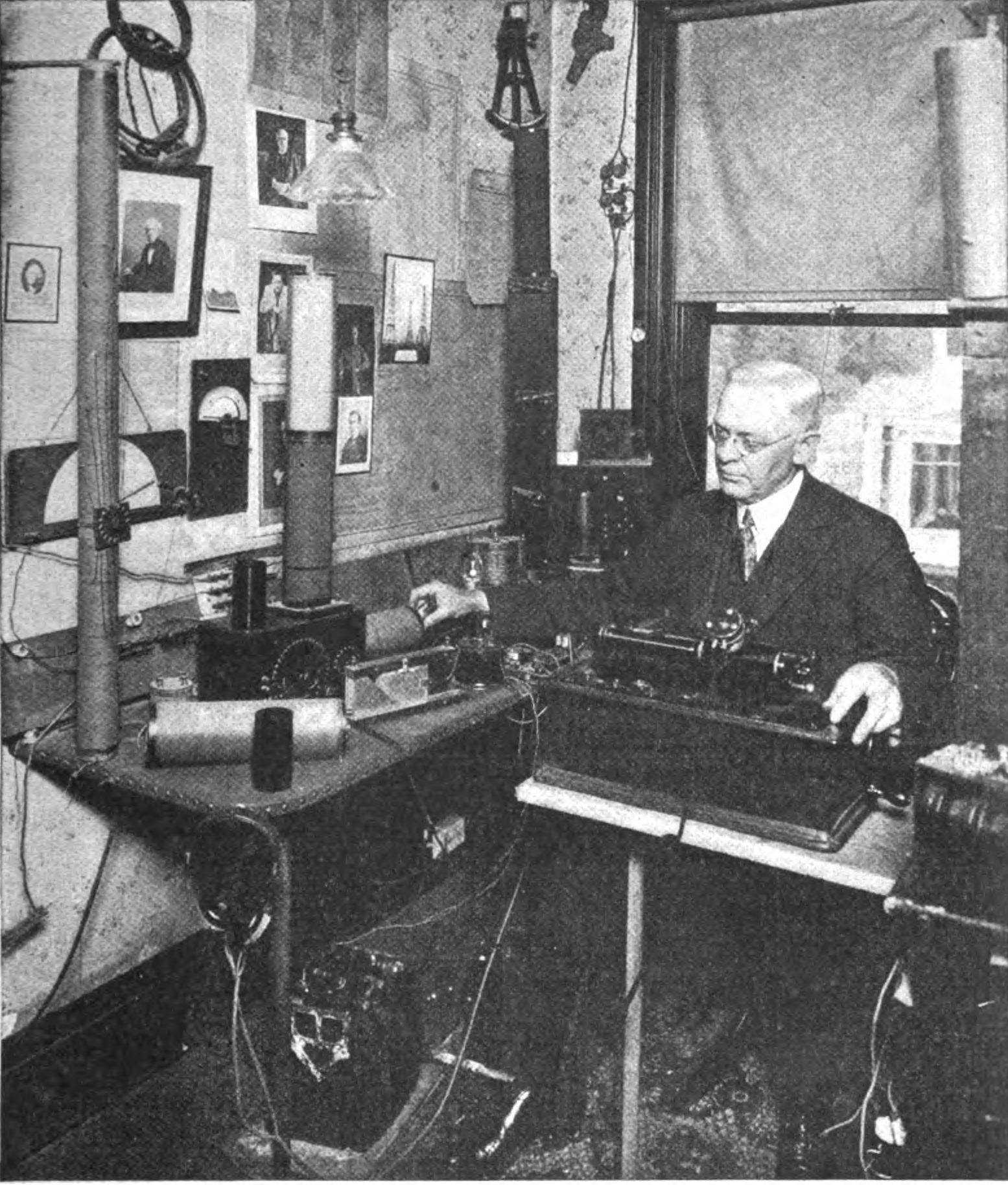
A photo of Apgar published in Popular Radio, November 1923.

A 1923 article by William J. Burns, then director of the Bureau of Investigation, (Note: The BOI was the predecessor to the Federal Bureau of Investigation.) in Popular Radio included a photo of Apgar. It was captioned "The Radio Detective Who Unfathomed the Famous 'Nauen Buzz'" and the description read:

During the early days of the World War the incredibly rapid and undecipherable radio signals between the most powerful broadcasting station in Germany and the station of the "Telefunken Company" at Sayville, Long Island, N. Y., aroused the attention of the U. S. officials. But it was radio amateur, Charles E. Apgar of Westfield, N. J., who finally found the solution by means of amplifiers that recorded these signals on wax phonograph cylinders. By this means the messages were de-coded – and the Long Island station was promptly seized. This picture shows Mr. Apgar operating the same apparatus which he used on that historic occasion.

The Sayville incident has been described as one of the first "overt acts" that led to American entry into World War I two years later. The specific information recorded on the wax cylinders remained a closely guarded secret in the government archives for many years.

The cylinders that he recorded were acquired by NBC in 1934. An example was displayed, along with the original receiving set that Apgar donated, as part of a museum exhibit in the lobby of Rockefeller Center. Apgar's work received renewed attention early during World War II when amateur radio operators began listening for "fifth column" activity such as odd coded messages sent from "mystery" stations. His work was noted by the ARRL in 2015 during a commemoration held on the 100th anniversary of the sinking of Lusitania. At this time he was also inducted into the CQ Amateur Radio Hall of Fame.

Some of Apgar's homemade equipment has been preserved at The Henry Ford museum. His original wax cylinders are believed to be lost, but some samples of his recordings survive. An interview of Apgar by George Hicks was broadcast on station WJZ and the NBC Blue Network on December 27, 1934. A tape copy of the original aluminum phonograph discs and a transcript is in the Recorded Sound Collection of the Library of Congress. A recording of this broadcast donated by Thorn Mayes is in the collection of the Antique Wireless Association. Broadcast historian Elizabeth McLeod considers Apgar's cylinders to be the earliest surviving recordings of a radio transmission based on research done by Dr. Michael Biel. Apgar has been referred to as a "pioneer home-recorder." He has also been credited with making the first permanent record of a wireless message.

=== Fictional portrayal ===
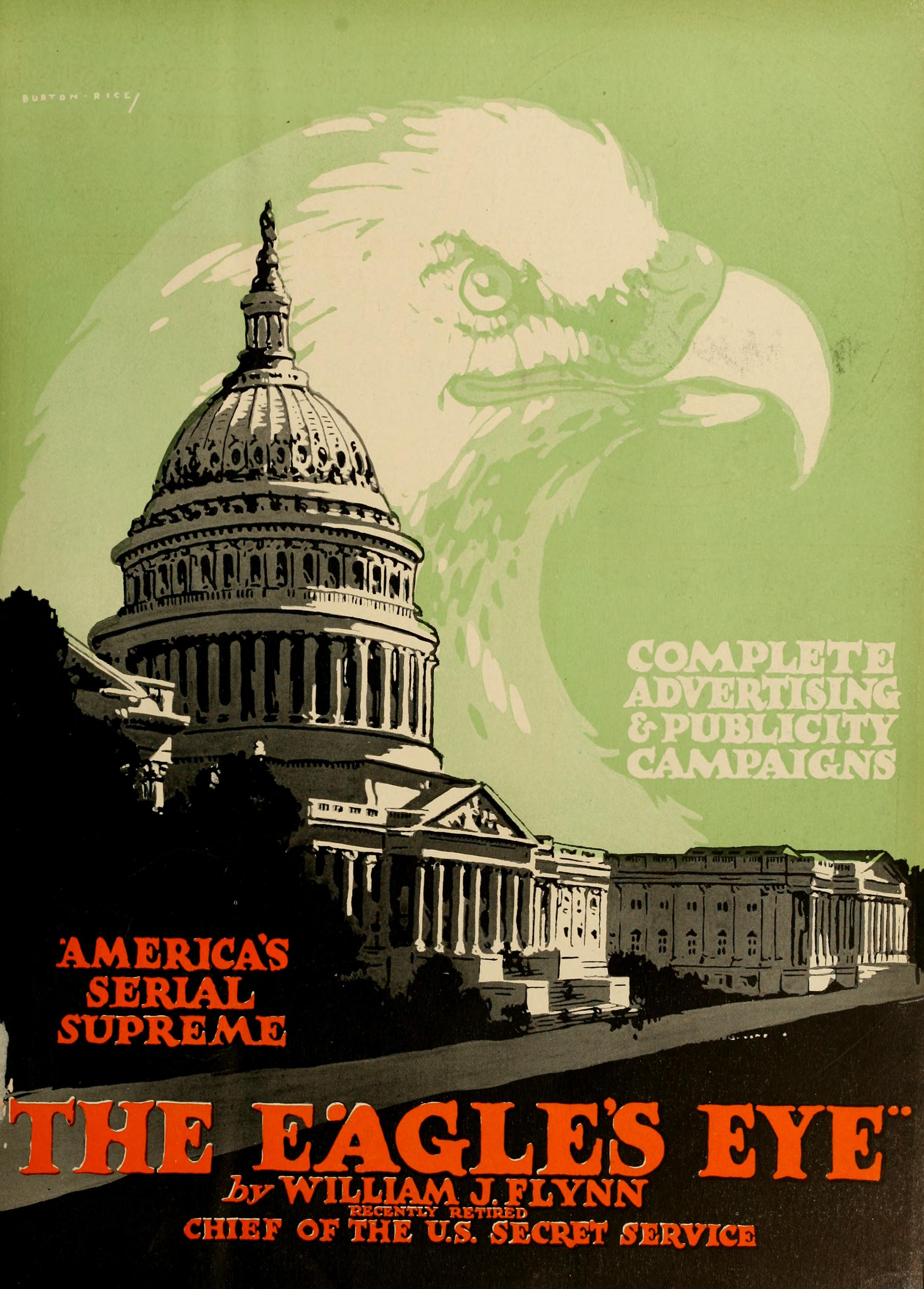
Advertisement for The Eagle's Eye serial.

After Flynn's retirement from the Secret Service, his experiences were adapted by Courtney Ryley Cooper into a 20-part spy thriller. These were published as weekly installments in The Atlanta Constitution's magazine section during 1918. The title of the series was The Eagle's Eye: A True Story of the Imperial German Government's Spies and Intrigues in America. An episode titled "The Great Hindu Conspiracy" (Note: This is a reference to an actual Hindu–German Conspiracy and the subsequent trial.) begins with a minor character named Charles E. Apgar. He is described as a "wireless expert" who is recruited to record messages from Sayville. The fictional Apgar is said to be "quite a linguist." The letter combinations hidden in the messages remind the character of Hindi. This observation is an important clue in the espionage investigation featured in the storyline. The episodes were also released as a serial film titled The Eagle's Eye. Fifteen of the episodes were republished as chapters in a book in 1919, though the story with Apgar was not included.
