= A. Atwater Kent =

American inventor and radio manufacturer (1873–1949)

Arthur Atwater Kent Sr.
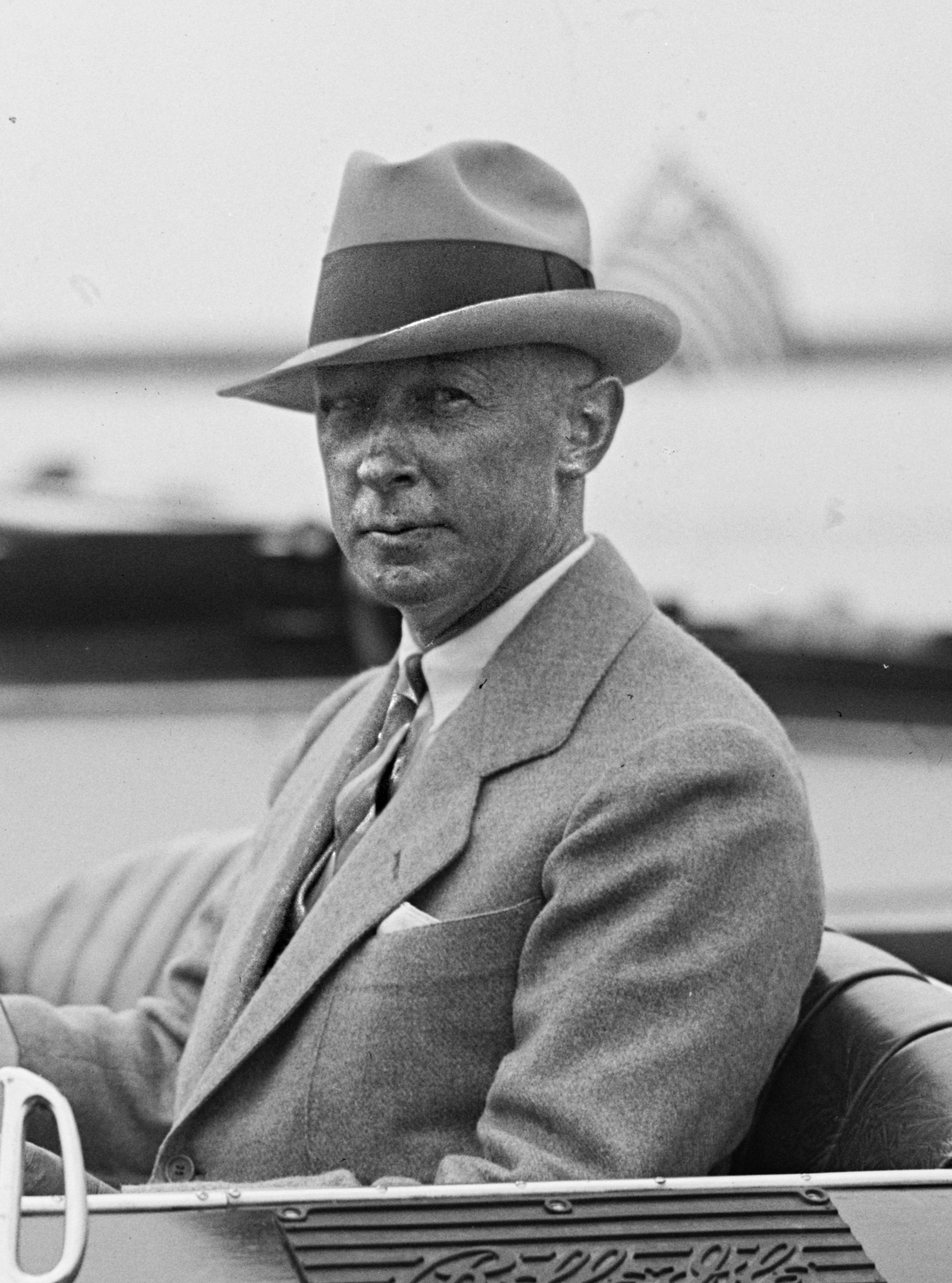
- Kent in 1925
- Born: December 3, 1873; Burlington, Vermont, US
- Died: March 4, 1949 (aged 75); Hollywood, California, US
- Education: Worcester Polytechnic Institute
- Spouse: Mabel (1883-1971)

Arthur Atwater Kent Sr. (December 3, 1873 – March 4, 1949) was an American inventor and prominent radio manufacturer based in Philadelphia. In 1905, he invented the Unisparker which combined ignition points, condenser, centrifugal advance mechanism, and distributor in one unit, the system used in virtually every automobile until the development of fully electronic systems in the 1970s and '80s. In 1921, Kent patented the modern form of the automobile ignition coil.

== Biography ==
Arthur Kent was born on December 3, 1873, in Burlington, Vermont.

The Kent family moved to Worcester, Massachusetts in 1881, where they lived at four different locations. His father was a doctor who had also been a machinist. The father maintained a machine shop in Worcester when Arthur was a child. Kent entered Worcester Polytechnic Institute’s freshman mechanical engineering class in the fall of 1895. He was elected treasurer of the class of 1899, but only remained in the position for one semester, because he did not attend recitation classes after the mid-year exams in January. Kent excelled in mechanics and drawing, but was weak in chemistry, algebra, and language, and had no interest in these subjects. He was already running a small business and that was his top priority. His business was called the Kent Electric Manufacturing Company, which he began in the back room of his father’s machine shop, and from which he sold small electric motors, generators, fans, and later automobile ignition systems. The Unisparker Ignition systems became the automobile industry standard for almost 50 years, until the advent of the high energy ignition (HEI) systems.

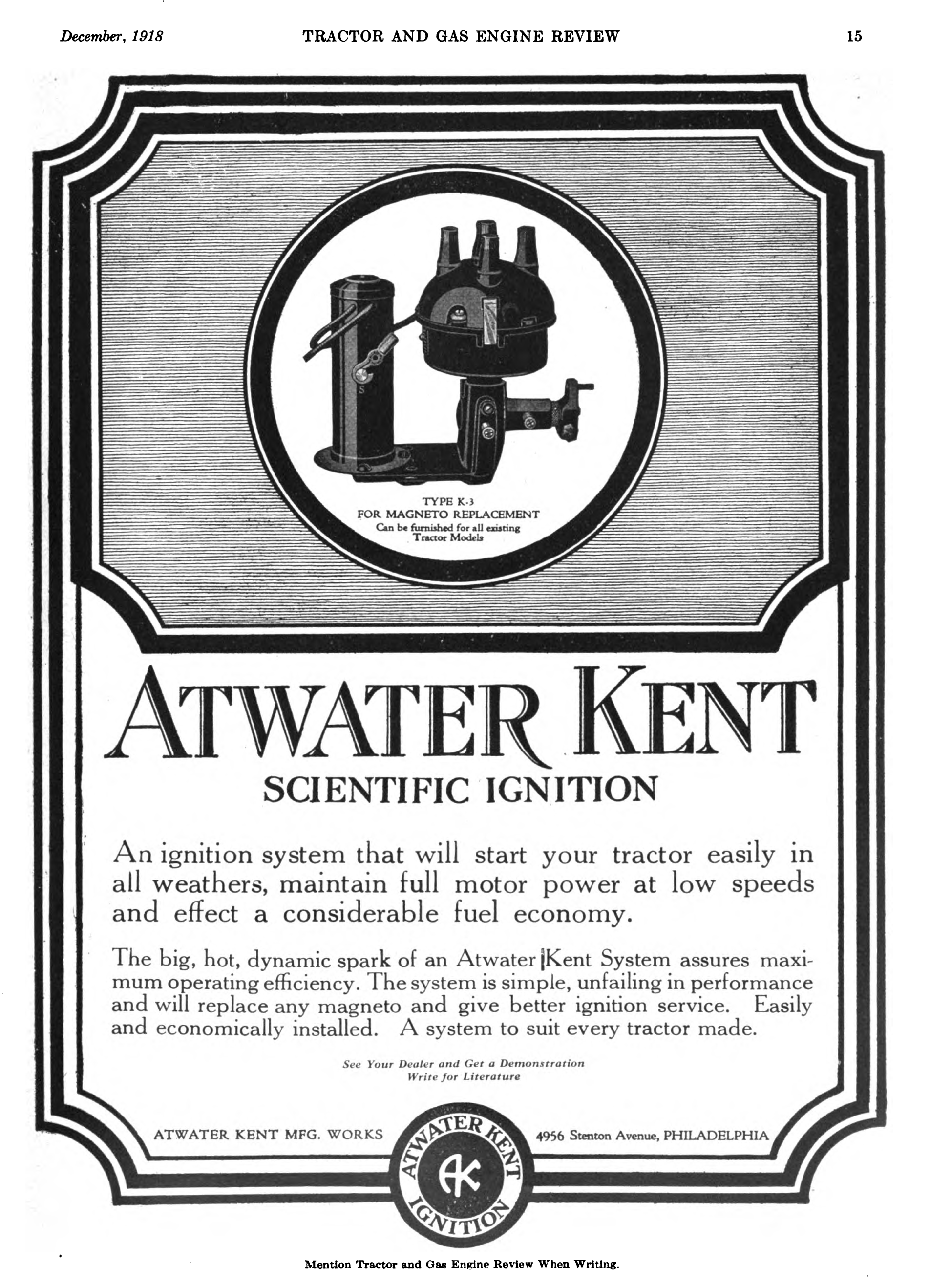
An advertisement for Atwater Kent ignition systems for tractors, in Tractor and Gas Engine Review, December 1918.

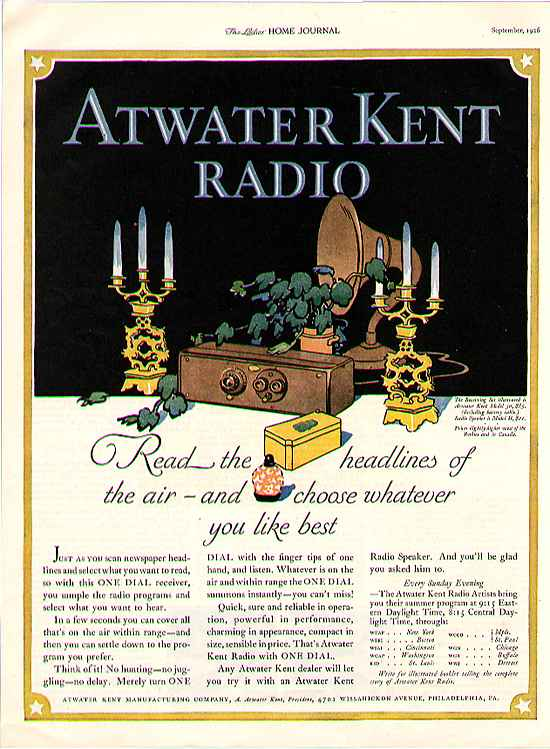
Ad for an Atwater Kent Radio receiver in the Ladies' Home Journal (September, 1926)

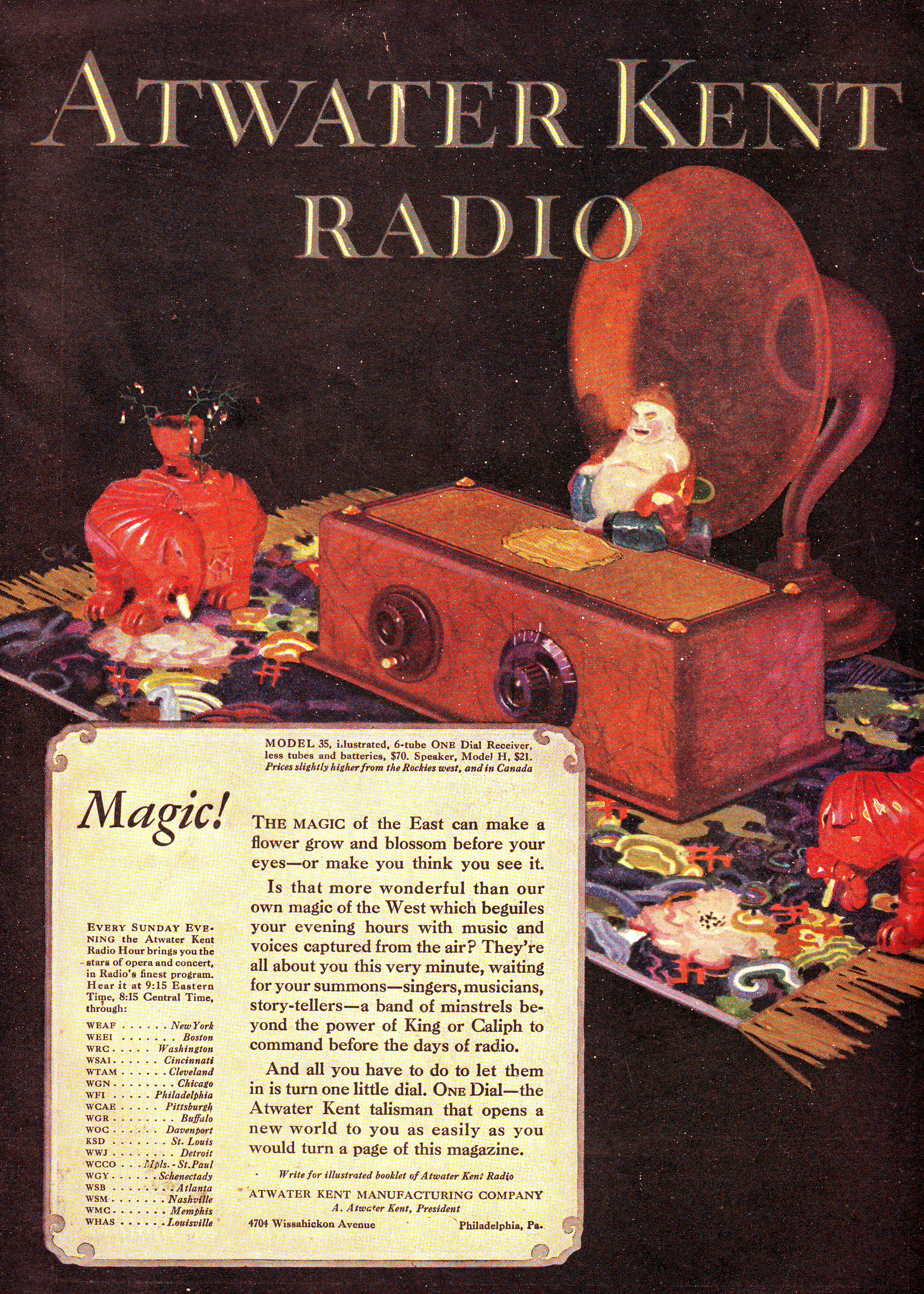
Ad for Atwater Kent Radio Model 35, 1927

In 1921, Kent produced his first radio components, selling the do-it-yourself kits consisting of "breadboards" that could be assembled by early radio enthusiasts. The same year, he introduced the Model 5, primarily as a promotional tool. In 1923, his firm started producing complete radio sets, using a facility on Stenton Avenue, introducing the Model 10 for Christmas that year. This was followed by the Model 9 "and a broad line of breadboard sets". In 1924, the company moved to a new $2 million plant at 4745 Wissahickon Avenue in East Falls section of Philadelphia. This plant, constructed in sections, would eventually cover 32 acres (13 ha) and be considered one of the most modern and forward-thinking manufacturing plants in the world.

In 1925, the Atwater Kent Manufacturing Company became the largest maker of radios in the United States. The company also sponsored the popular The Atwater Kent Hour, a top-rated radio concert music program heard on NBC and CBS from 1926 to 1934. The show featured top entertainment and became one of the most popular and acclaimed regular radio programs of the era. At its peak in 1929, the company employed over 12,000 workers manufacturing nearly one million radio sets. Its models included the metal-cabinet seven-tube Model 57 at US$105 and the wooden-cabinet eight-tube Model 60 at US$80. The plant itself was an architectural sensation and received hundreds of visitors annually. By 1931, the company boasted that it had produced over three million radios.

Atwater Kent radios were of high quality and many examples of working models exist today; they are highly prized by collectors and restorers. Their wooden cabinets were made for Atwater Kent by the Red Lion and Pooley furniture companies. Some models looked more like furniture than radios, and others had multiple functions, like the radio housed inside a grandfather clock.

The onset of the Great Depression led to greatly diminished demand for Atwater Kent's expensive radio sets. The company adjusted to consumer demands by building smaller, tabletop radio sets, but Kent was not one to compromise on quality. A drop in demand was compounded by the expiration of patents on the superheterodyne circuit—which led directly to the proliferation of inexpensive All American Five radio designs. New firms could now easily enter the radio manufacturing market without the same level of capital investment Kent had put into his production process, which relied on heavy metal presses for the relatively large Tuned Radio Frequency (TRF) type radio chassis the firm produced. Kent dissolved his design engineering facility in 1931, and shuttered his radio factory in 1936. A major local competitor, Philco, acquired the closed plant and built its refrigerators there.

In 1937, Kent helped to organize and pay for the restoration of the Betsy Ross House in Center City Philadelphia. In 1938, Kent helped found the Atwater Kent Museum of Philadelphia, Philadelphia's city history museum, by purchasing the original home of the Franklin Institute on South 7th Street and donating it to the City of Philadelphia.

== Personal life ==
His daughter, Virginia Tucker Kent (April 17, 1915 – April 29, 1966) married and divorced Cummins Catherwood, and inspired Patricia Highsmith, resulting in the novel The Price of Salt.

Atwater Kent died on March 4, 1949, in Hollywood, California. He is buried at Forest Lawn Memorial Park, Glendale, California.

== Legacy ==
He was awarded the John Scott Medal of The Franklin Institute in 1914.

Kent's son-in-law, William L. Van Alen, is the founder of the United States Court Tennis Association

Kent was inducted into the Broadcast Pioneers of Philadelphia's Hall of Fame in 1992.

== Patents ==
- U.S. patent 1,391,256 – Induction coil structure – 1921
- U.S. patent 1,474,152 – Induction coil – 1923
- U.S. patent 1,474,597 – Induction coil – 1923
- U.S. patent 1,569,756 – Ignition coil – 1926
- U.S. patent 1,597,901 – Radio apparatus – (Filed November 29, 1922; Issued August 31, 1926.)

== Sources ==
- McMahon, Morgan E. A Flick of the Switch 1930–1950. Antiques Electronics Supply, 1990. Pages 62 & 63. ISBN 0-914126-10-5.
- Williams, Ralph O. "Atwater Kent: Master of Marketing". The AWA Review, Vol. 10, 1996.
