= William E. Allen =

Former director of the U.S. Bureau of Investigation

William Allen
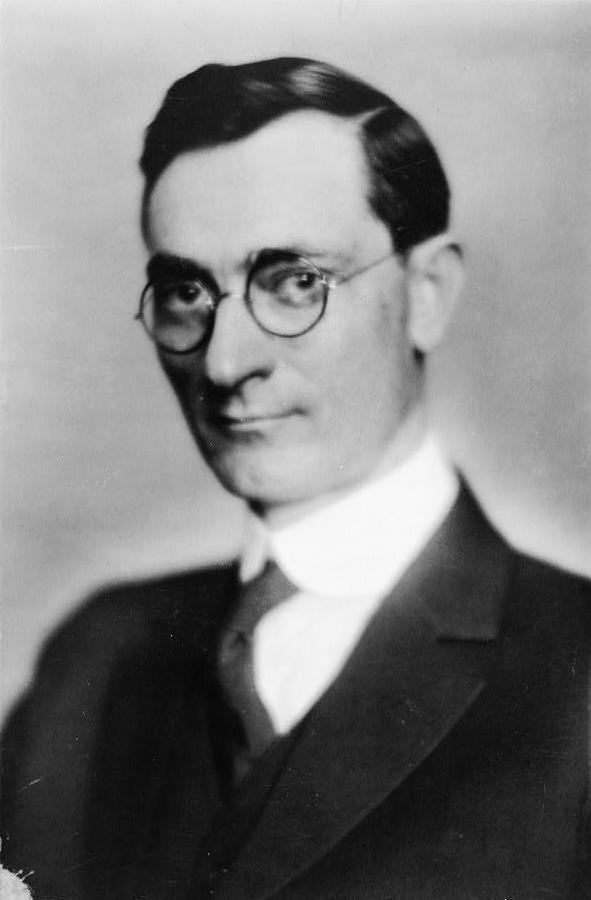

Chief of the Bureau of Investigation
- Acting
- In office February 10, 1919 – July 1, 1919
- President: Woodrow Wilson
- Preceded by: A. Bruce Bielaski
- Succeeded by: William J. Flynn

Personal details
- Born: 1880 Texas, U.S.
- Died: 1960 (aged 79–80) Texas, U.S.
- Children: 18

Military service
- Allegiance: United States
- Rank: General

William Ellam Allen (1880–1960) was an acting director of the U.S. Bureau of Investigation (BOI) during 1919. The BOI was a predecessor of the Federal Bureau of Investigation (FBI).

A former assistant in war matters to the chief of the Bureau of Investigation, Allen was appointed acting director on February 10, 1919. Allen resigned the post from June 30, 1919, and was replaced by William J. Flynn.

Government offices
Preceded by A. Bruce Bielaski	Chief of the Bureau of Investigation; Acting; 1919	Succeeded by William J. Flynn
