= George Hicks (broadcast journalist) =

American broadcast journalist

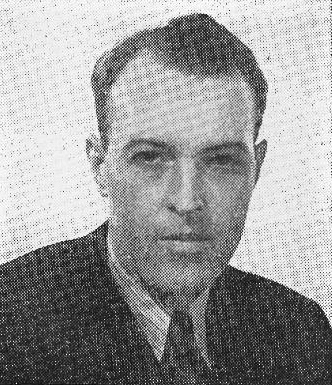
- Hicks in a 1944 advertisement
- Born: George Francis Hicks; August 26, 1905; Tacoma, Washington, U.S.
- Died: March 17, 1965 (aged 59); Queens, New York, U.S.
- Occupations: Announcer, journalist

George Francis Hicks (August 26, 1905 – March 17, 1965) was an American announcer and broadcast journalist. He was a noted war correspondent, first with NBC and then with the Blue Network.

== Early years ==
Hicks was born in Tacoma, Washington, the son of Iowa-born dentist Dr. Archie Greenwood Hicks and Grace Mildred (Mackay) Hicks. He graduated from Stadium High School and George Washington University after attending several other colleges. While at Stadium, Hicks took a news writing course.

== Career ==
Hicks applied at Tacoma radio station KMO after graduation but was turned down. In fall 1928, he went to Washington, D.C. to enter the Foreign Service School at Georgetown University, but was hired by radio station WRC several weeks later on October 15 that year. He was the announcer on a program called "Half Hours With the Senate," which was broadcast on the NBC network. He was transferred to NBC in New York on November 25, 1929. By 1931, he had broadcast such celebrities as Calvin Coolidge, Herbert Hoover, Albert Einstein, Mary Pickford and Maurice Chevalier, and covered such events as the arrival of Admiral Byrd from the South Pole, the Poughkeepsie Regatta, World Series baseball games with Graham McNamee, the Lipton yacht races and the arrival of the Graf Zeppelin at Lakehurst, New Jersey on its around-the-world trip.

On December 27, 1934, NBC's Hicks interviewed Charles E. Apgar, a New Jersey radio amateur who made some of the first recordings of radio broadcasts during 1913–1915, including recordings of German spy messages during World War I.

While based in London during World War II in 1942, he conducted a series of interviews aired on the Blue Network of servicemen from different countries telling of the horrors of war. Hicks recorded an on-the-scene report of the Normandy landings from the USS Ancon. It was broadcast on the night of June 6, 1944, over the American networks via a pool feed. During the broadcast there were sounds of heavy bombardment. His voice was described as "modest" and "incapable of false drama" and was considered particularly well suited for covering the landings. The New York World-Telegram called his broadcast "The greatest recording yet to come out of the war."

On Christmas Day that year, Hicks was one of a number of newsmen injured when a Nazi bomb wrecked a small hotel in Belgium where they were staying.

Hicks was also an announcer on Jack Benny's Canada Dry Ginger Ale Program, his final broadcast being on October 26, 1932, as the show changed networks from NBC to CBS. He appeared on the Shower of Stars television program of February 13, 1958, celebrating Benny's "40th" birthday. Another program on which he announced was Death Valley Days. On a 1939 broadcast, he relived the days of his grandfather Frank Hicks, who journeyed from New York to California in 1879 in a search for gold.

After the war he was associated with the United States Steel Hour television program for ten years. He toured steel mills to do commercials for the program.

== Personal life ==
Hicks died of cancer at his home in Queens, New York.

== Legacy ==
He has a star on the Hollywood Walk of Fame at 6314 Hollywood Boulevard.
