= William H. Moran =

Chief of the United States Secret Service (1917–1936)

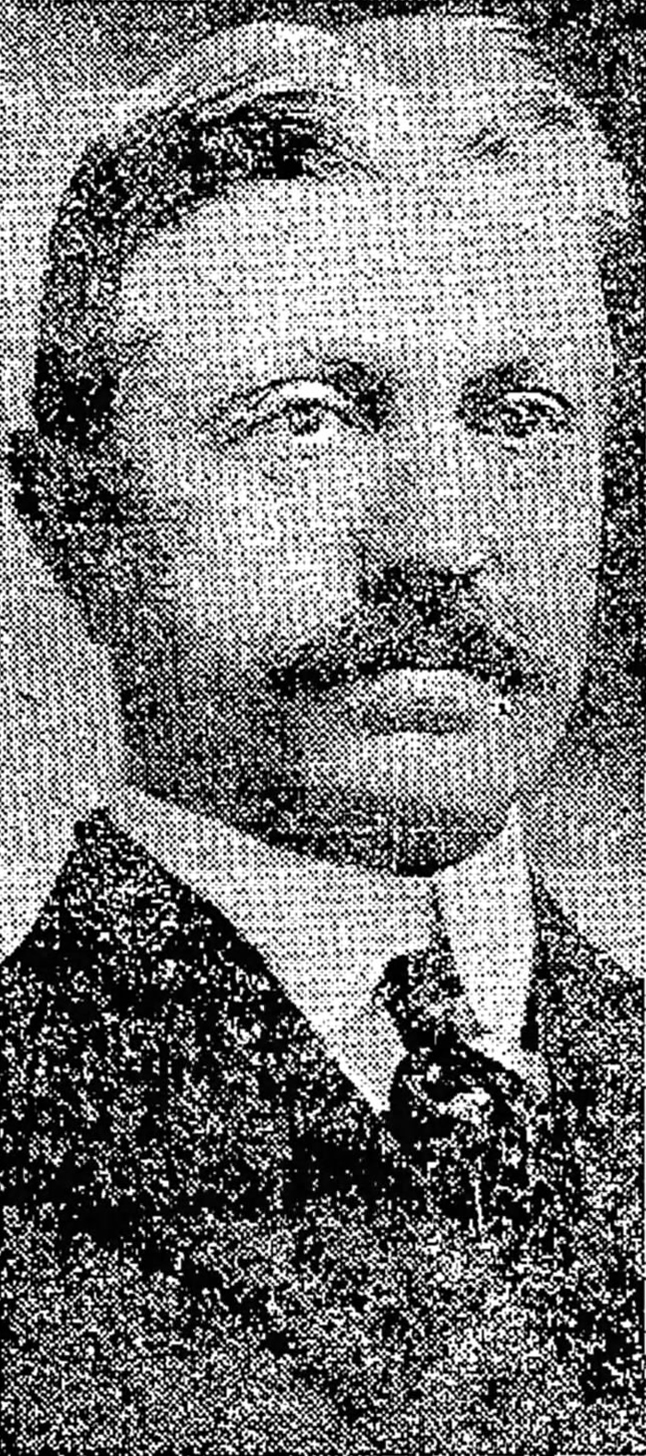

10th Chief of the United States Secret Service
- In office 1916–1936
- Appointed by: Woodrow Wilson
- President: Woodrow Wilson; Warren G. Harding; Calvin Coolidge; Herbert Hoover; Franklin D. Roosevelt
- Preceded by: William J. Flynn
- Succeeded by: Frank J. Wilson

Personal details
- Born: 1863 or 1864
- Died: September 10, 1946 (aged 82)

William Herman Moran (c. 1864 – September 10, 1946) was the longest-serving Chief of the United States Secret Service, serving from 1917 to 1936.

He was appointed by President Woodrow Wilson and served under five presidents: Wilson, Warren G. Harding, Calvin Coolidge, Herbert Hoover, and Franklin D. Roosevelt. During his tenure, Wilson presided over the 1917 expansion of the Secret Service's duties to include official protection of the president's family, the establishment of the White House Police Force in 1922, and the transition to small-sized currency in 1928, as well as the investigation into the Teapot Dome scandal. He was often at odds with FBI Director J. Edgar Hoover over issues of jurisdiction.

Preceded by William J. Flynn	Chief of the United States Secret Service; 1917–1936	Succeeded by Frank J. Wilson
