= Frank J. Wilson =

American law enforcement administrator (1887–1970)

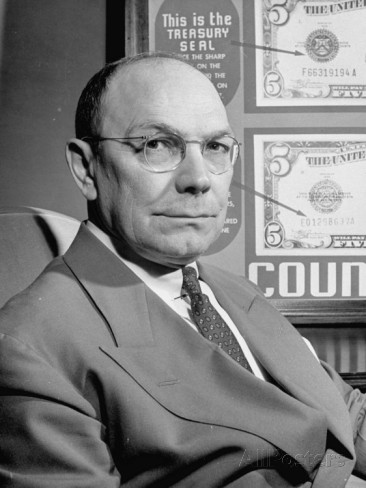
- Wilson in 1939

11th Chief of the United States Secret Service
- In office 1936–1947
- President: Franklin D. Roosevelt; Harry S. Truman
- Preceded by: William H. Moran
- Succeeded by: James J. Maloney

Personal details
- Born: Frank John Wilson; May 19, 1887 Buffalo, New York, U.S.
- Died: June 22, 1970 (aged 83) Washington D.C., U.S.
- Spouse: Judith B. Douglas
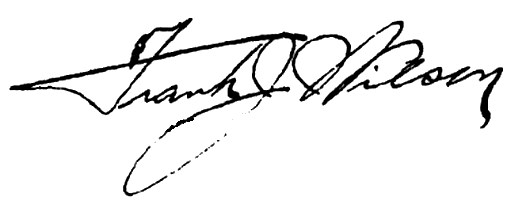
- Signature

Military service
- Branch/service: United States Army
- Battles/wars: World War I

Frank John Wilson (May 19, 1887 – June 22, 1970) was best known as the Chief of the United States Secret Service and a former agent of the Treasury Department's Bureau of Internal Revenue, later known as the Internal Revenue Service. Wilson notably contributed in the prosecution of Chicago mobster Al Capone in 1931, and as a federal representative in the Lindbergh kidnapping case.

== Early life ==
Frank J. Wilson was born in Buffalo, New York, on May 19, 1887. During World War I Wilson served for the United States Army for a brief stint before being honorably discharged in 1919 due to poor eyesight. In the same year Wilson became the Chief New York State Investigator for the United States Food and Drug Administration. This was short lived as Wilson then worked for the Department of Justice Fair Price Commission in 1920. In the same year Wilson took the opportunity to work for the United States Department of the Treasury as part of the Internal Revenue Bureau's intelligence unit until 1936. During this time Wilson helped on the Al Capone investigation, the Lindbergh kidnapping, and the Huey Long assassination. Overall, not much is known about Wilson's early life other than his career due to lack of information.

== Capone investigation ==
Upon joining the United States Treasury Department's Intelligence Unit in 1920, the former accountant Wilson would earn a reputation throughout Prohibition as a thorough, if not obsessive, investigator of tax returns and income.

"[Wilson] fears nothing that walks. He will sit quietly looking at books eighteen hours a day, seven days a week, forever, if he wants to find something in those books." - Elmer L. Irey

"[Wilson] sweats ice water" - Suspect who was interrogated by Frank J. Wilson

In January 1929, an investigation conducted by Prohibition agents under Alexander Jamie (including Jamie's brother-in-law, Eliot Ness) into bootlegging in Chicago Heights uncovered evidence indicating that Al Capone's brother Ralph had not paid taxes on a sizable illegal income. The 1927 Supreme Court decision in United States v. Sullivan having already established that any criminal activities that yield an income are subject to income taxes, the Intelligence Unit of the Bureau of Internal Revenue headed by Elmer L. Irey began to build tax evasion cases against leading figures in the Chicago Outfit, with the ultimate goal of convicting Al Capone. In April 1930, their efforts resulted in Ralph Capone's conviction for tax fraud, but the Intelligence Unit still lacked enough evidence to build a case against his brother Al.

In March 1930, attorney Frank J. Loesch of the Chicago Crime Commission asked President Herbert Hoover to take down Al Capone, adding additional impetus to the Intelligence Unit's efforts. Tax investigators in Chicago suspected that a large amount of Capone's income came from his interest in a race track for dogs, called the Hawthorne Kennel Club, in Cicero, run by a lawyer named E. J. O'Hare. In May 1930, Irey sent Frank J. Wilson, then 42, to lead the investigation into linking Capone to taxable income through his dealings with O'Hare.

From the time Wilson and his agents were put on the case, they examined over 2 million documents and evidence acquired in a number of raids on Capone's establishments over a six-year period. Their strategy was to show that Capone was spending a lot of money which would indicate to a jury that the money had to be coming from somewhere even though he did not have a formal job. Wilson and his men questioned merchants, real estate agents, proprietors, hotel clerks, bartenders, and accountants, many of whom were to afraid of what might happen to them if they gave information away about Capone. Wilson tried to extend some sort of protection to these individuals but they still refused to speak about their business with the gangster. The group of men continued to analyze phone records, investigating banks and credit card agencies. They found informers, seized books and searched for any weak point in Capone's operations.

One of the main issues that Wilson and his team faced was that not only did they have to find that Capone was making money, but they also had to find where the money was. Many leads turned up dead because of this, which caused the investigation to become frustrating. Capone himself was very smart about how he moved his money, and how he did business with his numerous establishments which made the investigation harder. However, Wilson was known for being exceptionally thorough and relentless in his search for information.

In attempting to find evidence of taxable income received by Capone ally Jake Guzik, Wilson and his agents found that someone going by the name of J.C. Dunbar purchased $300,000 worth of cashier's checks at a bank in Cicero. With help from informant O'Hare, Wilson was able to find out that Dunbar's real name was Fred Ries. The Intelligence Unit also discovered that he was on the run and was hiding in St. Louis. Wilson rushed to St. Louis and was able to find Ries with help from the postal inspectors. Wilson then arrested Ries and brought him back to Chicago. In Chicago, Wilson got Ries to testify that the cashiers checks represented gambling profits received by Guzik, and his testimony secured Guzik's conviction in late 1930. Intending to have Ries also testify against Capone, Wilson used funds from a group of wealthy Chicago businessmen, known as the "Secret Six," to send Ries on a boat trip to Uruguay and keep him safe until Capone's trial.

In the fall of 1930, working late in his office, Wilson discovered a ledger documenting financial records of a very large gambling operation. Every few pages there were calculations of net income that were to be divided to three individuals who were only referred to as A, R, and J in the ledgers. Wilson also found an entry that read:

Frank paid $17,500 for Al.

This was the best chance that Wilson had come across that linked Capone to income, but he still had to find where the money was being held in order to convince a jury that Capone was without a doubt guilty.

Now the goal was to track down the bookkeepers to get them to testify that "A" and "Al" were references to Capone in the ledgers. For over three weeks Wilson evaluated handwriting from every single one of Capone's associates. He checked voter registers, bank deposits, bail bonds certificates, and other documents. Informant E. J. O'Hare helped Wilson identify the bookkeeper as Leslie A. Shumway, who worked at a dog track in Miami. Wilson found Shumway there and persuaded him to testify against Capone. Shumway was to testify that the money was designated to go to Capone between the years of 1924 to 1926, first in front of a grand jury, then again at trial.

Around this time, Wilson's team found that between 1927 and 1928 there were monthly wire transfers from Capone to his family in Chicago. It was also found that Capone himself was receiving wire transfers in Miami under an assumed name. This was not just a coincidence as Shumway was tracked down at a dog track in Miami which also happened to be a big time interest of Capone.

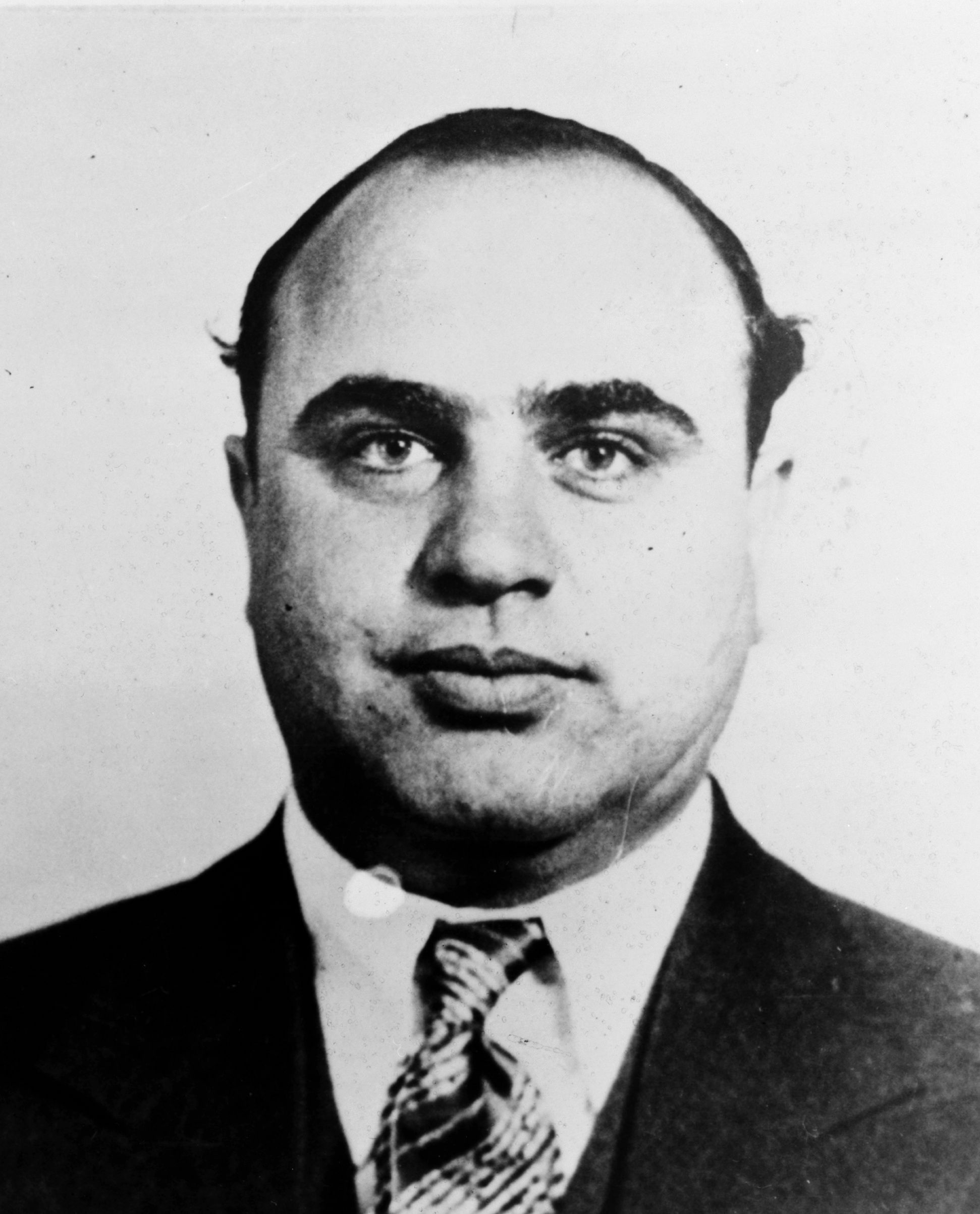
Capone's mugshot, 1931

In late 1930, O'Hare alerted the Intelligence Unit that Capone had hired killers from New York to assassinate Wilson, prosecutor George E. Q. Johnson, and other law-enforcement officials in Chicago. After federal officials moved to foil the plot, they heard that Capone had sent the killers back in hopes of not incriminating himself. However, the existence of these assassins was never substantiated, and some researchers have suggested that the tip about the contract was false, intended to confuse or misdirect federal investigators.

After the Treasury Department finally got all the evidence they needed to put an end to Capone, in March and June 1931 a grand jury met in court to decide his fate. The result was that Capone was indicted on 23 counts of tax evasion of over $250,000 of income from 1924 to 1929. Capone was proven guilty and was given an 11-year prison sentence and fined $300,000 in court costs. This was considered an astronomical price to pay for a tax evader at the time. Capone after serving his 11-year sentence at Alcatraz, was released and suffered from syphilis in the brain which led to his death in 1947 at age 48. Without the efforts of Wilson and his team Capone may never have been stopped, or his reign of terror could have gone on much longer.

== Later career ==
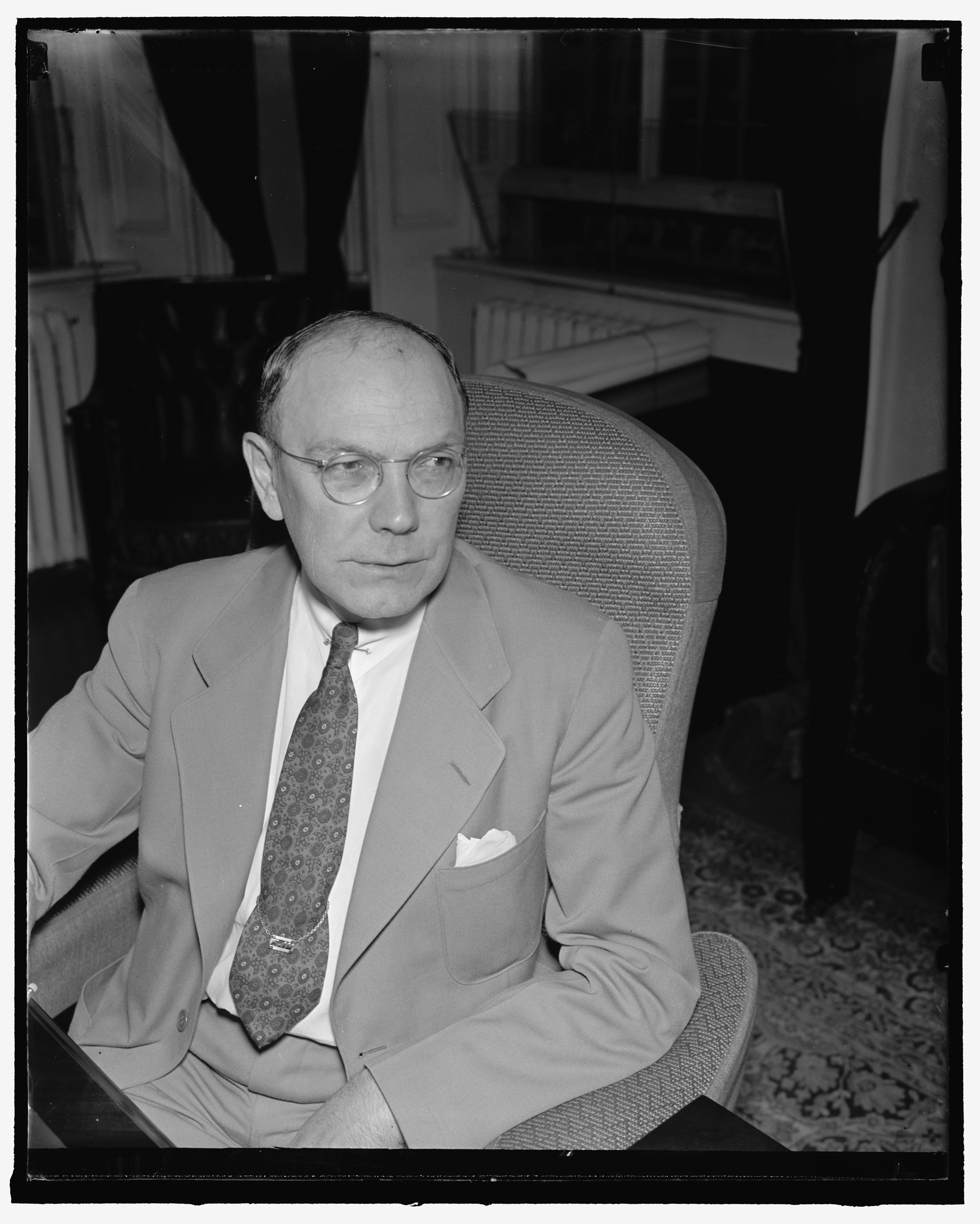
Wilson in 1940

Wilson was part of the team investigating the Lindbergh kidnapping. Some sources indicate that Wilson had insisted on tracking the serial numbers on the gold certificates used as ransom money (which ultimately led to the arrest and conviction of Bruno Richard Hauptmann). Other sources credit Elmer Irey.

In 1936, Wilson was named chief of the Secret Service and, resisting attempts by J. Edgar Hoover to transfer the Secret Service to the Justice Department under the jurisdiction of the FBI during the early 1940s, he had nearly eliminated the production and distribution of counterfeit money through a nationwide education program called "Know Your Money" by the time of his retirement in 1947. During his administration, he also initiated practices in presidential security which have since become standard procedure.

An article he wrote, Undercover Man: He Trapped Capone, was the basis for the 1949 film The Undercover Man. In the Brian De Palma 1987 film The Untouchables, the character Oscar Wallace (played by Charles Martin Smith) is loosely based upon Wilson.

On top of writing Undercover Man: He Trapped Capone in 1949, Wilson also wrote other books. In 1940 his first book was The Archives, and in 1945 he wrote Doubtful Dollars both of which have to do with his illustrious career.

Wilson died at the Georgetown University Hospital in Washington, D.C. on June 22, 1970, at the age of 83.

Government offices
Preceded by William H. Moran	Chief, United States Secret Service; 1936–1947	Succeeded by James J. Maloney
