= William J. Flynn =

Bureau of Investigation director (1867–1928)

William Flynn
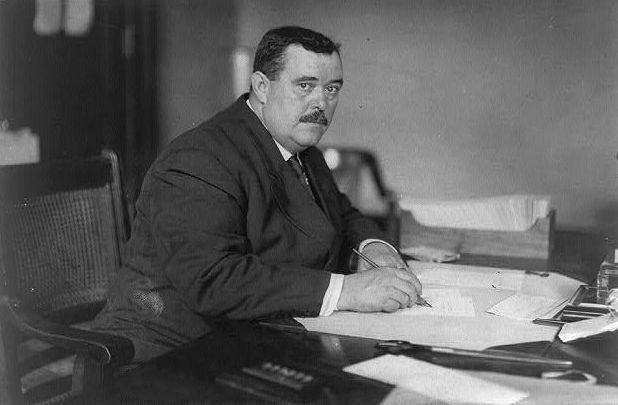

3rd Director of the Bureau of Investigation
- In office July 1, 1919 – August 22, 1921
- President: Woodrow Wilson; Warren G. Harding
- Preceded by: William E. Allen (acting)
- Succeeded by: William J. Burns

Director of the United States Secret Service
- In office 1912–1917
- President: William Howard Taft; Woodrow Wilson
- Preceded by: John Wilkie
- Succeeded by: William H. Moran

Personal details
- Born: November 18, 1867 New York City, New York, U.S.
- Died: October 14, 1928 (aged 60) Larchmont, New York, U.S.

William James Flynn (November 18, 1867 – October 14, 1928) was the third director of the Bureau of Investigation from July 1, 1919, to August 21, 1921.

== Early life and education ==
Flynn was born in New York City and began his government career in 1897, after receiving a public school education.

== Early career ==
Flynn began his career as a Manhattan plumber. His first law enforcement job was as an agent in the United States Secret Service. He spent many years combating counterfeiting, which led to his investigation and arrests of Black Hand extortionists and members of the American mafia, many of them associated with the Morello crime family.

Flynn collaborated with New York Police Department Detective Giuseppe "Joe" Petrosino, who was murdered in 1909 in Palermo, Sicily, where he was tracing the backgrounds of the gangsters plaguing New York City. Petrosino's murder was never officially solved, but the author and historian Mike Dash implicates the likely gunman and his accomplice and says there is little doubt that Giuseppe Morello was behind it. Flynn and his operatives built the case that culminated in the 1910 convictions of Morello and his associates and their imprisonment in Atlanta Federal Prison.

Flynn gained recognition in 1911, when he successfully reorganized the New York City detective force. He later returned to the Secret Service as Chief (1912–1917). During World War I he investigated threats of sabotage. In 1915 he investigated espionage involving a German-owned wireless station on the coast of Long Island in Sayville, New York. It was suspected of sending communications related to the war which were prohibited. He enlisted an amateur radio operator named Charles E. Apgar who recorded the transmissions. These recordings provided evidence that led to the facility being seized by the United States government to stop the activity.

== BOI career ==
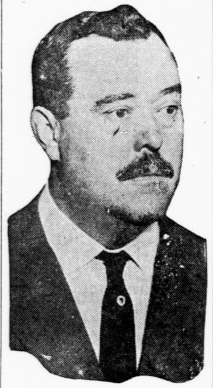
William Flynn, 1917

In 1919, Flynn was named director of the Bureau of Investigation. Attorney General Palmer praised his new appointee as "the leading, organizing detective of America...Flynn is an anarchist chaser...the greatest anarchist expert in the United States." In one of Flynn's high-profile incidents, one of his operatives who was trailing the German diplomat Dr. Heinrich Albert on a streetcar, snatched Albert's briefcase, which contained sensitive documents. The papers documented Albert's having spent $27 million to build up a spy network in the United States, using German money to fund dock strikes, attacks on shipping, and bombs planted in munitions plants.

=== Resignation ===
Flynn's hard-line approach to counterespionage and his scaremongering public statements meant to rouse the US to the threat of German espionage angered the German and Irish communities, and eroded Flynn's support in Washington, ending in his resignation.

After resigning, Flynn "accepted a sinecure as head of the Federal Railway Administration Police".

=== Reinstatement and replacement ===
Two years after leaving the Secret Service, in the wake of concerted terrorist action, including a bomb that "shook the home of A. Mitchell Palmer, the attorney general of the United States, virtually demolishing it", Palmer "dedicated his Department of Justice to tracking down the men responsible". He appointed Flynn director of the Bureau of Investigation. Flynn took charge of hunting down the bombers and assigned "an ambitious Justice Department clerk by the name of J. Edgar Hoover" to monitor suspected radicals.

Through painstaking work, Flynn's team identified the likely suspects. However, they were unable to obtain the type of evidence that would stand up in court. Public opinion turned against the bureau, as the public wanted arrests, and Hoover launched a series of "Palmer Raids" that became a public relations nightmare. These events resulted in low morale among Flynn's staff, and the new Harding Administration replaced Flynn with William J. Burns.

=== Semi-retirement ===
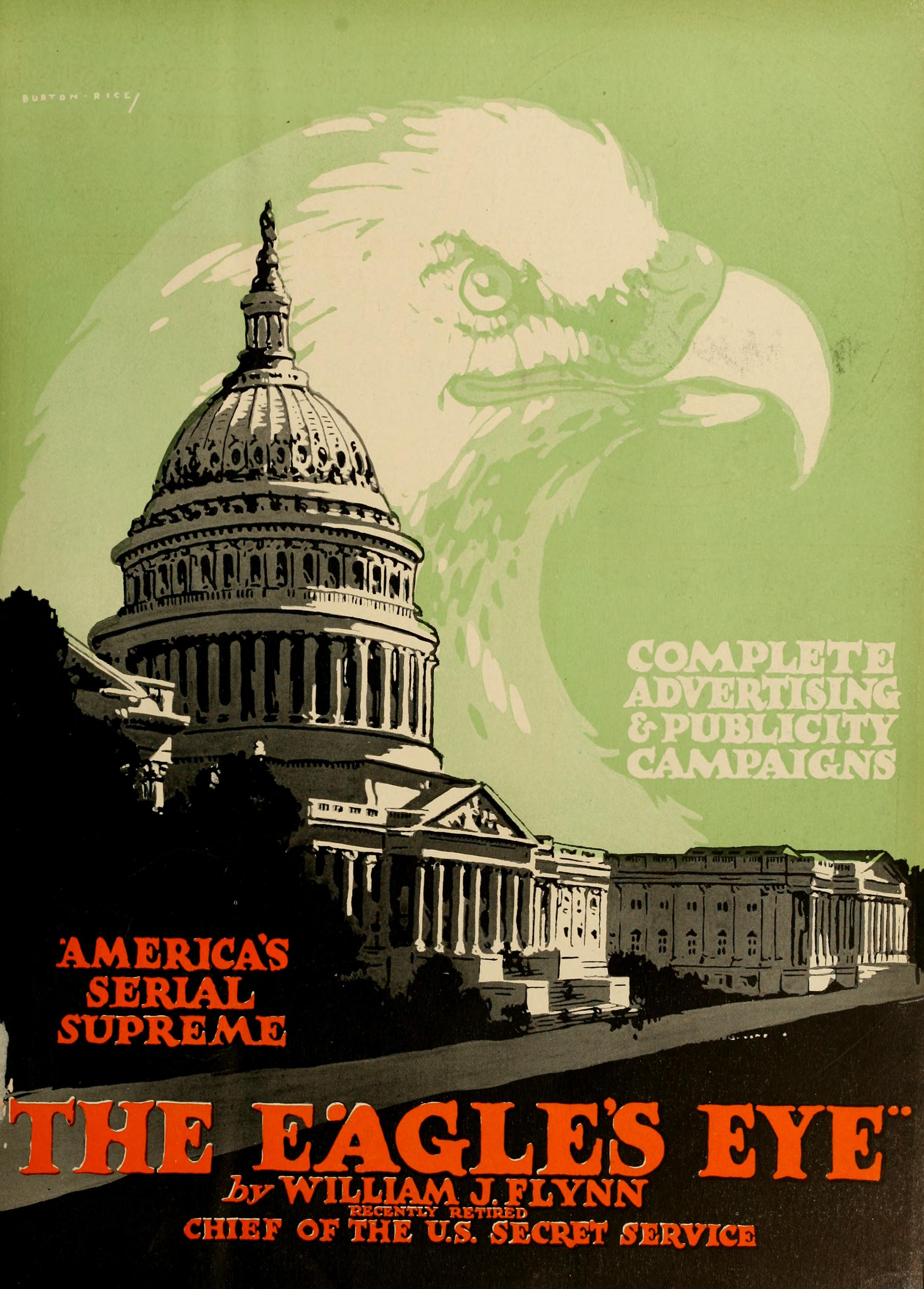
Advertisement for The Eagle's Eye

After his forced retirement, Flynn went into business for himself. He founded a New York detective agency with his daughter Veronica and son Elmer as partners, which generated some income. However, according to Dash, the partnership was unsuccessful and contributed to the business's ultimate demise: Veronica and Elmer "were running the detective business into the ground. Both heavy drinkers, they overspent and upset clients. The pair's increasingly erratic behavior distressed their more abstemious father, and the worry weakened him."

Flynn earned the bulk of his income, at that point, from writing. He had occasionally contributed articles, typically about his greatest cases, to such journals as The New York Herald and The Washington Post since 1911. After retiring, he worked briefly as a crime novelist. Flynn also became a scenario writer for the motion picture industry through his acquaintance with the actor King Baggot who, Dash notes, was considered the greatest film star in the country at that time in 1912. The producers Theodore and Leopold Wharton commissioned him to write story lines for their films, including The Perils of Pauline, and eventually adapted Flynn's experiences into a 20-part spy thriller titled The Eagle's Eye (1918), starring Baggot. The same year they were also published as weekly installments in The Atlanta Constitution's magazine section under the title The Eagle's Eye: True Story of the Imperial German Government's Spies and Intrigues in America. Some of these episodes were published in a book with the same name in 1919.

He also edited a magazine which bore his name, Flynn's Weekly Detective Fiction, and became the longest-running, most successful journal of its genre. After Flynn's death, the periodical was temporarily renamed Detective Fiction Weekly (formerly Flynn's) before resuming its original title; the periodical published a total of 929 issues.

== Death ==
Flynn died at age 60 of heart disease in October 1928, in Larchmont, New York. He is buried in a family plot in Valhalla, New York.

Government offices
| Preceded by John Wilkie | Director of the United States Secret Service; 1912–1917 | Succeeded by William H. Moran |
| Preceded by William E. Allen; Acting | Director of the Bureau of Investigation; 1919–1921 | Succeeded by William J. Burns |
