= The Undercover Man =

1949 film by Joseph H. Lewis

- Theatrical release poster
- Directed by: Joseph H. Lewis
- Screenplay by: Sydney Boehm; Malvin Wald (additional dialogue)
- Based on: Undercover Man: He Trapped Capone; 1947 story in Collier's by Frank J. Wilson and a story outline by Jack Rubin
- Produced by: Robert Rossen
- Starring: Glenn Ford; Nina Foch; James Whitmore
- Narrated by: John Ireland
- Cinematography: Burnett Guffey
- Edited by: Al Clark
- Music by: George Duning
- Color process: Black and white
- Production company: Columbia Pictures
- Distributed by: Columbia Pictures
- Release date: April 20, 1949
- Running time: 84 minutes
- Country: United States
- Language: English
- Box office: $1,950,000

The Undercover Man is a 1949 American crime film noir starring Glenn Ford and Nina Foch, and directed by Joseph H. Lewis. James Whitmore made his film debut in support.

== Plot ==
Frank Warren is a United States Treasury agent assigned to put an end to the activities of a powerful mob crime boss. The agent struggles to put together a case, but is frustrated when all he finds are terrified witnesses and corrupt police officers. Although most informants end up dead, Agent Warren gets critical information about the mob from an unlikely source.

== Cast ==
- Glenn Ford as Frank Warren
- Nina Foch as Judith Warren
- James Whitmore as George Pappas
- Barry Kelley as Edward O'Rourke
- David Bauer as Stanley Weinburg (as David Wolfe)
- Frank Tweddell as Insp. Herzog
- Howard St. John as Joseph S. Horan
- John F. Hamilton as Police Sergeant Shannon
- Leo Penn as Sydney Gordon
- Joan Lazer as Rosa Rocco
- Esther Minciotti as Maria Rocco
- Angela Clarke as Theresa Rocco
- Anthony Caruso as Salvatore Rocco
- Robert Osterloh as Manny Zanger
- Kay Medford as Gladys LaVerne
- Patricia Barry as Muriel Gordon (as Patricia White)

== Background ==
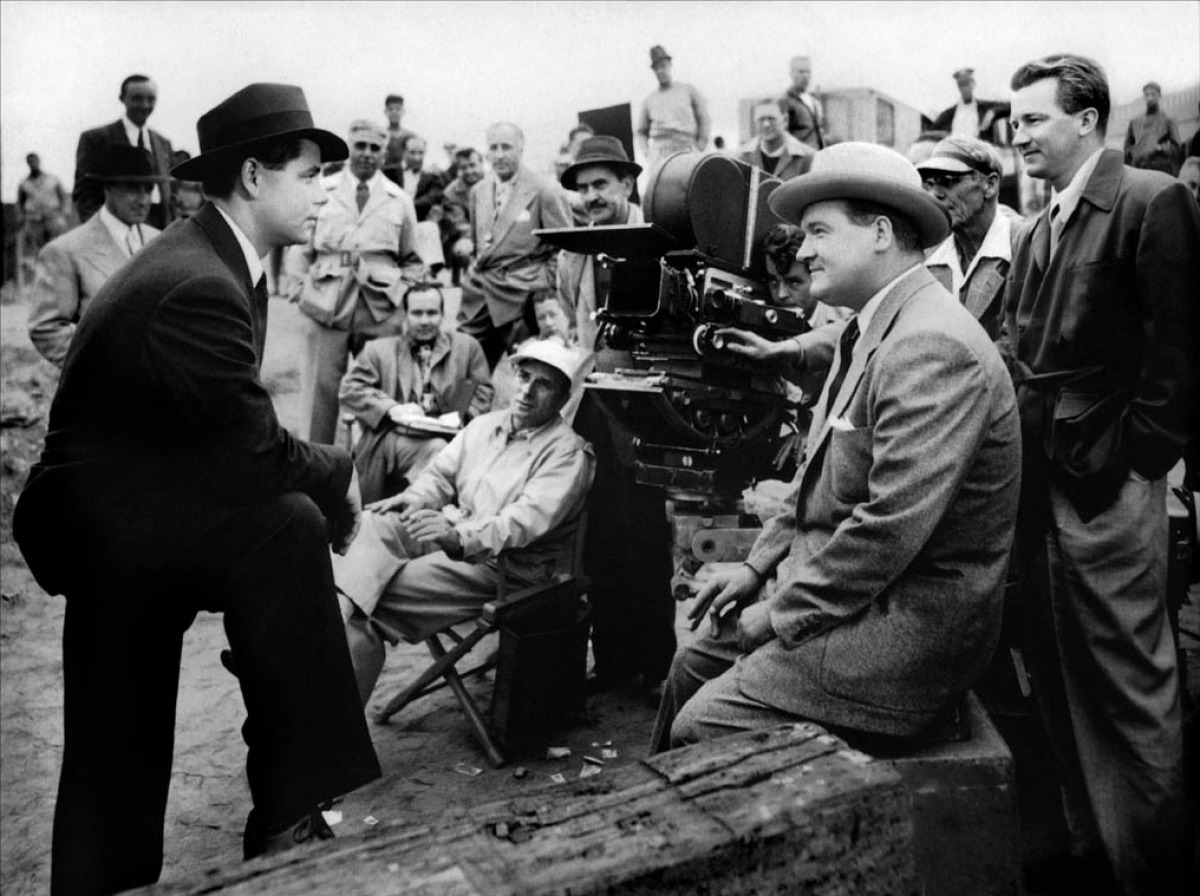
Glenn Ford, director Joseph H. Lewis and Barry Kelley on the set of The Undercover Man

The film was based on an article titled "He Trapped Capone," the first part of the autobiography Undercover Man by Federal Agent Frank J. Wilson, which was serialized in Collier's in 1947.

Many details were fictionalized. The timeframe was changed from the Prohibition era to the post-World War II war era. Chicago became an unnamed, unidentified big city. Al Capone was referred to only as the shadowy "Big Fellow", never shown by face, who had diversified into gambling, numbers, and protection rackets (as bootlegging was no longer a top enterprise following the repeal of Prohibition, a shift in business orientation reflecting the broad change in US organized crime in repeal's wake). IRS Criminal Investigator Frank Wilson became IRS Criminal Investigator Frank Warren.

In spite of the changes, the film still reasonably authentically portrayed the efforts of Wilson's team to put together a tax evasion case against Capone. In many respects, despite the name changes and undistinguished settings, it is a more accurate depiction of the investigation than such later films on the same subject as The Untouchables.

== Critical response ==
Bosley Crowther panned the film in The New York Times: "Furthermore—and this is fatal—it is a drearily static film, for all its explosive flurries of gun-play and passing of violent threats. The big crisis in the picture comes when the Treasury man, played by Glenn Ford, is uncertain whether to stick with the case or retire to a farm. And the basis of his decision to go on sleuthing for Uncle Sam is a long-winded lecture on justice which a sad-eyed Italian woman gives. Mr. Ford, in a battered gray hat and a baggy suit, makes a pretty case for higher salaries to civil servants but a not very impressive sleuth. And James Whitmore, who played the sergeant in Command Decision on the stage, seems much more inclined to low clowning than to accounting as an assistant on the case. Barry Kelley is robustly arrogant as 'the big fellow's' lawyer and front-man, with several other performers doing standard character roles."

The staff at Variety magazine gave the film a positive review, writing: "Narrated in a straightforward, hardhitting documentary style, The Undercover Man is a good crime-busting saga. Standout features are the pic's sustained pace and its realistic quality. Fresh, natural dialog help to cover up the formula yarn, while topnotch performances down the line carry conviction. Joseph H. Lewis's direction also mutes the melodramatic elements but manages to keep the tension mounting through a series of violent episodes."

Time Out film guide lauded the film in 2006 and wrote, "A superior crime thriller in the semi-documentary style beloved by Hollywood in the late 1940s...[the film] achieves an authenticity rare in the genre. Perhaps even more impressive is the acknowledgment that mob crime affects not only cops and criminals, but innocents too: witnesses are silenced, bystanders injured. And Lewis - one of the B movie greats - directs in admirably forthright, muscular fashion, making superb use of Burnett Guffey's gritty monochrome camerawork."

The film aired on the Turner Classic Movies show 'Noir Alley' with Eddie Muller.
