= William J. Burns =

American private investigator (1861–1932)

4th Director of the Bureau of Investigation
- In office August 22, 1921 – May 10, 1924
- President: Warren G. Harding; Calvin Coolidge
- Deputy: J. Edgar Hoover
- Preceded by: William J. Flynn
- Succeeded by: J. Edgar Hoover

Personal details
- Born: October 19, 1861 Baltimore, Maryland, U.S.
- Died: April 14, 1932 (aged 70) Sarasota, Florida, U.S.
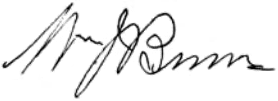
- Signature

William John Burns (October 19, 1861 – April 14, 1932) was an American private investigator and law enforcement official. He was known as "America's Sherlock Holmes" and earned fame for having conducted private investigations into a number of notable incidents, such as clearing Leo Frank of the 1913 murder of Mary Phagan, and for investigating the deadly 1910 Los Angeles Times bombing conducted by members of the International Association of Bridge, Structural, Ornamental and Reinforcing Iron Workers. From August 22, 1921, to May 10, 1924, Burns served as the fourth director of the Bureau of Investigation (BOI), predecessor to the Federal Bureau of Investigation (FBI).

He was born in Baltimore and educated in Columbus. As a young man, Burns performed well as a United States Secret Service Agent and parleyed his reputation into the William J. Burns International Detective Agency, now a part of Securitas Security Services USA. A combination of natural ability as a detective combined with an instinct for publicity made Burns a national figure. His exploits made national news, the gossip columns of New York City newspapers, and the pages of detective magazines, in which he published true crime stories based on his exploits.

== Marriage and children ==
Burns married Annie M. Ressler in 1880. The couple had six children. Burns's sons, Raymond J. and William Sherman, also worked as detectives for the William J. Burns National Detective Agency.

== Los Angeles Times bombing ==
The City of Los Angeles hired Burns to catch those responsible for the bombing of the Los Angeles Times building on October 1, 1910, which killed 20 people. Revenge or anger was the suspected motive as Times publisher Harrison Gray Otis was a staunch opponent of labor unions, and the incident was similar to a nationwide series of dozens of earlier but not-fatal bomb attacks that Burns had been investigating for the National Erector Association.

After months of investigation, Burns's son Raymond and police officers from the Detroit and Chicago police departments arrested Jim McNamara and associate Ortie McManigal on April 14, 1911, in Detroit. Ironworkers Union secretary-treasurer John McNamara, Jim's brother, was arrested later that month in Indianapolis, Indiana. Extradited to Los Angeles, the brothers pleaded guilty to murder in the bombing. The MacNamara brothers were important members of the Ironworkers Union and the investigation implicated numerous other members of the union up to President Frank M. Ryan. Burns's investigation found the Ironworkers Union leadership knew and approved of over 100 bombings between 1905 and 1910, perhaps the largest domestic terrorism campaign in American history.

== BOI career ==
Burns was considered well qualified to direct the Bureau of Investigation, and was friends with President Warren Harding's Attorney General Harry M. Daugherty. Burns was confirmed as Director of the Bureau of Investigation on August 22, 1921. He continued to run the Burns Detective Agency throughout his tenure as Director of the BOI. Under Burns, the Bureau shrank from its 1920 high of 1,127 personnel to 600 employees in 1923. Burns was responsible for hiring the first female special agents, Alaska P. Davidson in 1922 and Jessie B. Duckstein in 1923.

In the Summer of 1922, Burns orchestrated a raid on the Bridgeman Convention, where the American Communist Party was discreetly holding a meeting. Despite capturing swathes of incriminating evidence, the resulting prosecution was largely a failure. In the trial of trade union leader William Z. Foster, an undercover operative testified that Burns had ordered him to lie in order to frame Foster as a "dangerous subversive"; the case resulted in a hung jury.

At the request of Attorney General Daugherty, Burns sent agents to investigate Montana Sen. Thomas J. Walsh for evidence of criminal wrongdoing. The investigation was actually a pretext for retaliation; the congressman had been instrumental in opposing oil leases granted by Secretary of the Interior Albert Fall, a friend of Daugherty and fellow cabinet member. Burns later refused to turn over Department of Justice documents to Congressional investigators, who in turn began investigating the BOI; Senate hearing revelations of BOI misdeeds were avidly covered in the press, and became known as the Daugherty-Burns scandal. Burns's BOI field agents made visits to the offices of newspapers around the country who had presented the BOI's actions in a negative light; their clumsy attempts to intimidate newspaper editors caused a backlash in public opinion and Congress. Burns was forced to resign in 1924 at the request of Attorney General Harlan Fiske Stone and on May 10, 1924, J. Edgar Hoover took over the position on a provisional basis.

== Burns Detective Agency and Teapot Dome ==
In October 1924, the CPUSA's Daily Worker newspaper reported that Jacob Spolansky, recently resigned from the BOI, had joined the Burns Detective Agency, run by "Bill" Burns, "King of Dicks."

Burns also became indirectly involved in the Teapot Dome Scandal, involving the secret leasing of naval oil reserve lands to private companies. In November 1927, Harry F. Sinclair went on trial in federal court for conspiracy to defraud the US in the leasing of the Teapot Dome naval oil reserve. At the request of Sinclair oil executive Henry Mason Day, Burns secretly hired a squad of 14 men from the William J. Burns Detective Agency to "investigate" his jurors. Day arranged for their compensation and received their daily reports. Midway through the trial the government's investigators discovered Burns's agents, and a mistrial was immediately declared.

At a new hearing, Sinclair's defense was that he had had the jurors followed to protect them against federal influences and that in no case had the operatives made direct contact with the jurors. Sinclair was convicted on corruption charges and sentenced to six months in jail, Day to four months' imprisonment, William J. Burns to 15 days' imprisonment, and Burns's son, William Sherman Burns, was ordered to pay a $1,000 fine. The father immediately appealed, and the Supreme Court later reversed his conviction (Sinclair v. United States, 279 US 749 – Supreme Court 1929).

== Later life and death ==
After his retirement from the Burns Detective Agency, Burns moved to Florida and for several years published detective and mystery stories based on his long career. He died of a heart attack in Sarasota, Florida, in April 1932.

Burns was portrayed by actor Paul Dooley in the television miniseries The Murder of Mary Phagan. A fictionalized version of Burns was played by Gary Basaraba in the film Killers of the Flower Moon; this character was an amalgamation of Burns and other private investigators who were hired to look into the Osage Indian murders.

== Writings ==
- The masked war; the story of a peril that threatened the United States New York, George H. Doran Co. 1913
- The Argyle case with Arthur Hornblow, Harriot Ford and Harvey O'Higgins New York, London, Harper, 1913
- The crevice with Isabel Ostrander New York : Grosset & Dunlap, 1915

== See also ==
- Palmer raids
- Teapot Dome Scandal
- Gaston Bullock Means
- The $5,000,000 Counterfeiting Plot

== Notes ==
Government offices
Preceded by William J. Flynn	Director of the Bureau of Investigation; 1921–1924	Succeeded by J. Edgar Hoover as Director of the Federal Bureau of Investigation
