= Antique Wireless Association =

American non-profit organization

AWA Journal
- Language: English
- Edited by: David D. Kaiser

Publication details
- Former name: Old Timer's Bulletin
- History: 1952–present
- Publisher: Antique Wireless Association
- Frequency: Quarterly

Standard abbreviations
- ISO 4: AWA J.

Indexing
- AWA Journal
- ISSN: 1937-1810
- Old Timer's Bulletin
- ISSN: 1546-0622

Links
- Journal homepage

The Antique Wireless Association Review
- Language: English
- Edited by: Timothy Martin

Publication details
- History: 1952–present
- Publisher: Antique Wireless Association
- Frequency: Annual

Standard abbreviations
- ISO 4: Antiq. Wirel. Assoc. Rev.

Indexing
- ISSN: 1536-7592
- OCLC no.: 22267206

Links
- Journal homepage

The Antique Wireless Association (AWA) is chartered as a non-profit educational organization in New York State and is an IRS 501(c)(3) tax-exempt corporation based in Bloomfield, New York. It was originally established in 1952 by Bruce Kelley, George Batterson, and Linc Cundall for operators and collectors of radio equipment. The association currently has more than 1300 international members. It is a member of the American Association of Museums. It hosts an annual meeting in August. The association runs the Antique Wireless Museum.

The association publishes two journals, the quarterly AWA Journal (known as the Old Timer's Bulletin from 1952 until 2004) which focuses on history and preservation efforts, as well as the annual AWA Review, established in 1986, which features more extensive discussions. Since 2017, the museum has a quarterly newsletter called Museum Sparks.
