= Rufus Youngblood =

United States Secret Service agent

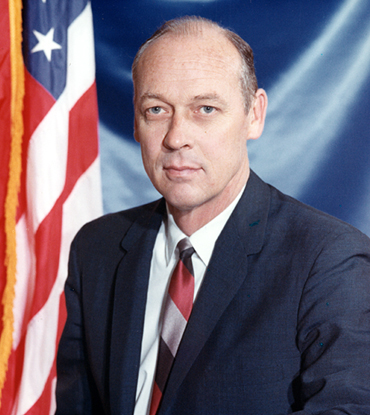
- Born: Rufus Wayne Youngblood, Jr. January 13, 1924; Macon, Georgia, U.S.
- Died: October 2, 1996 (aged 72); Savannah, Georgia, U.S.
- Education: Georgia Institute of Technology
- Occupation: United States Secret Service agent
- Known for: Shielded Lyndon B. Johnson during the assassination of John F. Kennedy

Rufus Wayne Youngblood, Jr. (January 13, 1924 – October 2, 1996) was a United States Secret Service agent best known for using his body to shield Vice President Lyndon B. Johnson during the assassination of John F. Kennedy in Dallas, Texas on November 22, 1963.

== Early life ==
Youngblood was born in Macon, Georgia. His father was a railroad worker who died in a rail accident when Rufus was only two. He was left with his mother, whose permission he asked before enlisting in the United States Army Air Corps during World War II. He was a waist gunner in the 324th Bombardment Squadron on some of America's first bombing raids on Germany. He earned a Purple Heart during the war.

After the war, he obtained a degree in electrical engineering from Georgia Institute of Technology in Atlanta. He joined the Secret Service in March 1951, having obtained the job ahead of thirty-four applicants for the post. Initially he dealt with financial fraud in the office in Atlanta. In 1953, after having impressed superiors, he was assigned to White House detail.

== Assassination of John F. Kennedy ==
During the Kennedy assassination, Youngblood was riding in Johnson's limousine. When the shots were fired, he vaulted over the front seat and threw his body over the vice president. In his 1973 book Twenty Years in the Secret Service: My Life with Five Presidents, Youngblood said that he had not known whether the sound he heard was a gunshot, a bomb, or a firecracker. He considered the public attention to his quick action in protecting Johnson somewhat exaggerated. That evening, Johnson called Secret Service Chief James J. Rowley and cited Youngblood's bravery. In his memoirs, Johnson described Youngblood's response as being "as brave an act as I have ever seen".

== Later career ==
In January 1965, Youngblood succeeded Gerald A. Behn as head of the White House detail. In October 1966 Youngblood was figured prominently in photographs and stories in Australian newspapers when two young men, John and David Langley, threw bags of red and green paint at the presidential limousine as it drove through the streets of Melbourne. The paint was the colours of the National Liberation Front ('Viet Cong') flag, and the brothers threw it at Johnson in protest against his administration's actions in Vietnam. In 1969, he was promoted to deputy director of the Secret Service. When Johnson was succeeded by Richard M. Nixon, Youngblood felt increasingly sidelined by the new administration, and took early retirement in 1971, at the age of 47.

Youngblood then sold real estate and became a master gardener in Savannah, Georgia. He died of cancer at the age of 72 in a hospice near his Savannah home.
