= U. E. Baughman =

American law enforcement official (1905–1978)

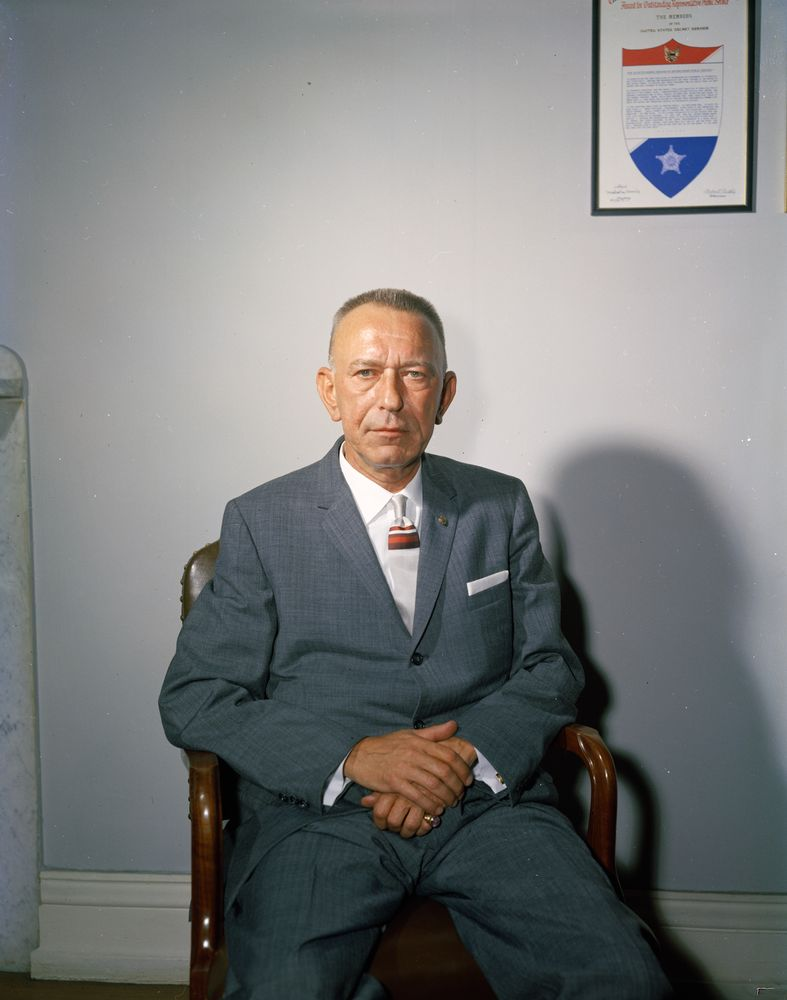
- Baughman in 1961

13th Chief of the United States Secret Service
- In office November 29, 1948 – August 31, 1961
- President: Harry S. Truman; Dwight D. Eisenhower; John F. Kennedy
- Preceded by: James J. Maloney
- Succeeded by: James Joseph Rowley

Personal details
- Born: Urbanus Edmund Baughman; May 21, 1905 Camden, New Jersey, U.S.
- Died: November 6, 1978 (aged 73) Toms River, New Jersey, U.S.
- Resting place: Arlington Cemetery; Drexel Hill, Pennsylvania
- Spouse: Ruth Baughman (m. 1936)
- Parent(s): Urbanus Edmund Baughman Sr. (1870–1936); Alberta Faunce Baughman (1873–1955)

Urbanus Edmund Baughman (May 21, 1905 – November 6, 1978) was an American law enforcement official who served as the 13th chief of the United States Secret Service from 1948 to 1961. A career Secret Service employee, he joined the agency in 1927 and rose through its ranks before becoming chief. He served under Presidents Harry S. Truman, Dwight D. Eisenhower, and John F. Kennedy.

During Baughman's tenure, the Secret Service was responsible for protecting Truman during the 1950 assassination attempt at Blair House. Baughman also oversaw an investigation into the theft of $160,000 from the Bureau of Engraving and Printing and reorganized the agency to provide greater administrative control from Washington. After retiring from government service, he published Secret Service Chief (1962), an account of his career and the work of the Secret Service.

== Early life and career ==
Baughman was born on May 21, 1905, in Camden, New Jersey. He joined the United States Secret Service in 1927 as a clerk-stenographer in its Philadelphia office. While still a clerk, he received assignments as an undercover investigator. In 1932, he participated in an extortion investigation involving threats against the governor of New Jersey, acting as the intermediary in the attempted delivery of $5,000 to the extortionists. Two suspects were subsequently arrested.

Baughman became a Secret Service agent in 1934. That year, while working undercover, he purchased counterfeit currency from a recently released offender; investigators subsequently traced the currency to a counterfeiting ring in New York. He also participated in investigations that included the arrest of Herman Petrillo, a member of the Philadelphia poison ring.

In 1941, Baughman was transferred to New York City as assistant to the supervising agent. He became agent in charge of the Newark office in 1943, supervising agent in Washington, D.C., in 1945, and supervising agent in New York City in 1947.

== Chief of the Secret Service ==
=== Appointment ===
Baughman became chief of the Secret Service in November 1948, succeeding James J. Maloney. According to Stephen Hunter and John Bainbridge Jr. in American Gunfight, Truman's decision to replace Maloney was influenced by Maloney's decision to send much of Truman's protective detail to New York before the 1948 presidential election in anticipation of Republican nominee Thomas E. Dewey winning the presidency.

=== Blair House assassination attempt ===
On November 1, 1950, Puerto Rican secessionists Oscar Collazo and Griselio Torresola attempted to assassinate President Truman at Blair House, where Truman was living during renovations to the White House. Baughman went to Blair House after the shooting and took personal charge of the Secret Service investigation. In the aftermath, Baughman asked Congress for additional special agents and assigned a small detail to protect Vice President Alben W. Barkley.

=== Presidential protection ===
Testifying before the Senate Appropriations Committee in 1953, Baughman described the presidency as allowing little normal family life or privacy, calling the president a "slave to his office". He reported that the Secret Service had handled 2,535 presidential-protection cases during the previous year, resulting in 74 arrests; 72 of those arrested were sent to prisons or mental institutions. Baughman described the agency's greatest concern as escaped mental patients who held grievances against the president or the federal government.

=== Organized crime ===
In an interview with The Washington Post published on July 26, 1961, the day after his retirement was announced, Baughman emphatically stated that there had been no mafia in the United States for 40 years. He further denied the existence of a national crime syndicate based on talks with other law enforcement officials.

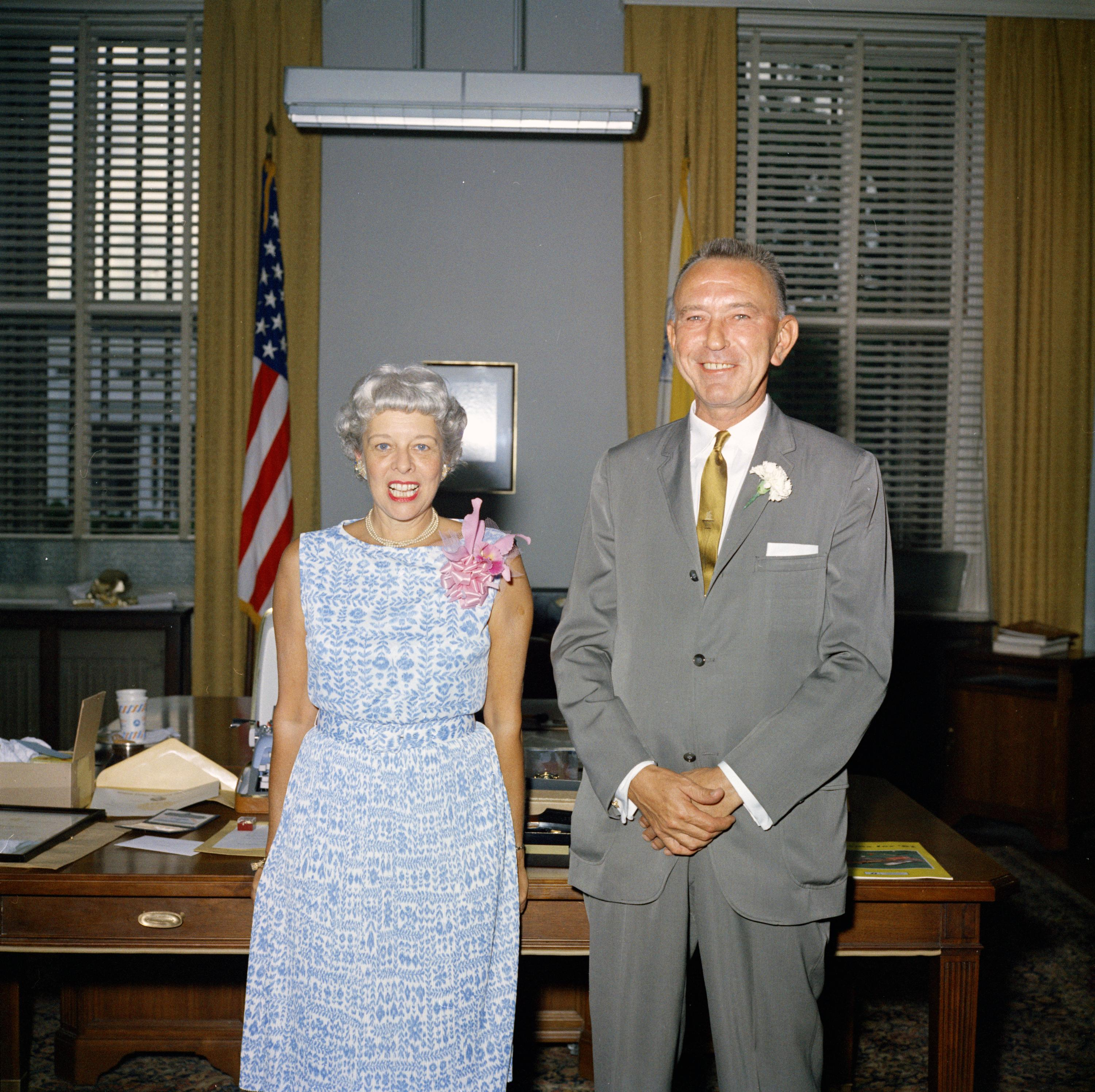
Baughman and his wife Ruth at his retirement party on August 24, 1961.

=== Retirement ===
In July 1961, The New York Times reported that Baughman planned to retire the following month after 34 years with the Secret Service, including 13 years as chief. He reportedly had no plans to seek another position and hoped to spend his retirement swimming, boating, and fishing. The newspaper also reported that he was considering writing a book about his career.

A retirement party for Baughman was held at the White House on August 24, 1961. His retirement became effective on August 31, and he was succeeded by James Joseph Rowley.

== Later life ==
=== Secret Service Chief ===
After retiring from government service, Baughman wrote Secret Service Chief with Leonard Wallace Robinson. The book, published by Harper in 1962, recounted Baughman's career and described the work of the Secret Service, including its evolution from a counterfeit detection agency, criminal investigations, and presidential-protection responsibilities.

=== Kennedy assassination ===
Shortly after the assassination of President Kennedy, Baughman raised concerns about how the Secret Service had handled events in Dallas. In a U.S. News & World Report interview published in December 1963, he remarked that there were still unresolved questions about the assassination. He acknowledged that "you cannot protect the President from every danger," but warned: "And the greatest danger is from a sniper hiding in a high building."

Baughman later offered more detailed criticisms of Secret Service procedures. He questioned why, after the first shot was fired, agents did not immediately pepper the window with machine gun fire to prevent any further shots, and why—with an entire Secret Service detail and the Dallas Police Force on hand—the only shots that were fired came from the assassin. He claimed it was basic training for all Secret Service agents that unauthorized people should be kept out of buildings.

== Media appearances ==
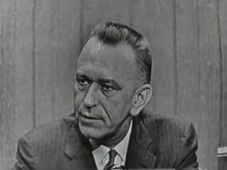
Baughman appearing on What's My Line? on November 27, 1955

Baughman appeared as a mystery guest on What's My Line? on November 27, 1955. Host John Charles Daly explained that Baughman was to be honored at the White House and appear in Look magazine the following week, and that the program wanted to feature him before the panelists became familiar with his appearance. He later appeared on To Tell the Truth on April 9, 1957.

== Death ==
A resident of Pine Beach, New Jersey since 1965, Baughman died on November 6, 1978, from arteriosclerotic heart disease at the Community Memorial Hospital in Toms River, New Jersey. He is buried in Arlington Cemetery in Drexel Hill, Pennsylvania along with his parents and wife Ruth, who died in 2004.

Government offices
Preceded by James J. Maloney	Chief, United States Secret Service; November 29, 1948 – August 31, 1961	Succeeded by James J. Rowley
