= H. Stuart Knight =

Director of the United States Secret Service (1921–2009)

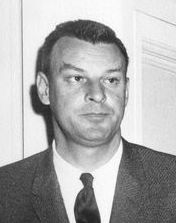
- H. Stuart "Stu" Knight (1961)

15th Director of the United States Secret Service
- In office November 7, 1973 – November 30, 1981
- President: Richard Nixon; Gerald Ford; Jimmy Carter; Ronald Reagan
- Preceded by: James Joseph Rowley
- Succeeded by: John R. Simpson

Personal details
- Born: January 6, 1921 Sault Ste. Marie, Ontario, Canada
- Died: September 7, 2009 (aged 88) McLean, Virginia, U.S.
- Children: 5
- Education: Michigan State University; Federal Executive Institute; Princeton University
- Awards: Purple Heart; Silver Star

Military service
- Branch/service: United States Army
- Battles/wars: World War II: Pacific Theater

H. Stuart Knight (January 6, 1921 – September 7, 2009) was director of the United States Secret Service between 1973 and 1981. Prior to this position, Knight briefly worked as a police officer before he joined the United States Secret Service as a special agent in 1950. During his career, Knight was assigned to keep the president of the United States and vice president of the United States safe between 1951 and 1963. In this role, Knight protected the Vice President when the attack on Richard Nixon's motorcade occurred in 1958.

As a director, Knight held his position when assassination attempts were made on Gerald Ford and Ronald Reagan from 1975 to 1981. At the end of his directorship, Knight had worked for eight United States presidents. Outside of the Secret Service, Knight worked for Guardsmark between the mid-1980s and late 1990s. In 2001, Knight was named into a Wall of Honor for Michigan State University.

== Early life and education ==
Knight was born in Sault Ste. Marie, Ontario, on January 6, 1921. While the Great Depression in Canada was occurring, Knight spent part of his childhood living in Detroit, Michigan, with his family. Growing up in Detroit, Knight was a newspaper hawker.

For his education, Knight went to Michigan State University and attended a police program. While at Michigan State, Knight enlisted in the United States Army and received multiple medals while fighting in the Pacific Theater of World War II. These medals included the Purple Heart and Silver Star. Additional education Knight completed included courses at the Federal Executive Institute and Princeton University.

== Career ==
From 1948 to 1950, Knight began his career as a police officer. For his policing experience, he primarily worked in Michigan and briefly worked in Berkeley, California. In 1950, Knight returned to Detroit when he became a special agent for the United States Secret Service. That year, Knight moved to Washington while continuing his Secret Service tenure.

At Washington, Knight became part of the Secret Service in charge of keeping the president of the United States safe in 1951. Knight held his protective role for Harry S. Truman, Dwight D. Eisenhower and John F. Kennedy. In 1958, Knight protected the Vice President of the United States when an attack on Richard Nixon's motorcade occurred in Venezuela. In leadership roles, Knight continued to keep the vice president of the United States safe as a special agent in charge from 1961 to 1963. He then led the Special Investigations department in 1963. When Lyndon B. Johnson was the United States vice president during this period, he was accompanied by Knight during his trips.

Between the late 1960s and early 1970s, Knight worked on counterfeit money cases for Los Angeles and Washington. In 1971, Knight started with the Secret Service for Administration. For over two years, Knight was an assistant director before he became the director of the United States Secret Service on November 7, 1973. Knight was in charge of planning protection for Richard Nixon when he was to visit the Middle East as the United States president during 1974.

The following year, Knight was the director of the Secret Service when assassination attempts were made on Gerald Ford in Sacramento and San Francisco during 1975. He held executive positions with the International Association of Chiefs of Police and Interpol during the late 1970s. By 1980, Knight remained with the Secret Service as director while Jimmy Carter was the president of the United States.

In 1981, Knight continued to hold his director position when the attempted assassination of Ronald Reagan occurred in March 1981. That year, Knight ended his position as director on November 30, 1981. Knight had worked for eight United States presidents by the end of his Secret Service career.

=== Post Secret Service ===
In 1982, Knight said he would not write about his career as he believed it would negatively change the "respect and confidentiality between the president and the Secret Service". Knight was vice-chairperson of security company Guardsmark in 1984. By the late 1990s, Knight was with Guardsmark in a senior advisor position. Outside of security, Knight was selected to the Virginia Lottery in 1987.

== Honors ==
Following the 1958 attack on Nixon, Knight was a recipient of the "exceptional civilian service award" from the United States Department of the Treasury. In 1987, Knight went to Murray State University to present the Harry Lee Waterfield Distinguished Lecture in Public Affairs. He was named into a Wall of Honor at Michigan State in their criminal justice department during 2001.

== Death and personal life ==
On September 7, 2009, Knight died in McLean, Virginia, from chronic obstructive pulmonary disease. He was married and had five children.
