= John Simpson (police official) =

Director of the United States Secret Service (1932–2017)

John R. Simpson
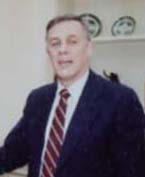

President of Interpol
- In office 1984–1988
- Preceded by: Jolly Bugarin
- Succeeded by: Ivan Barbot

16th Director of the United States Secret Service
- In office 1981–1992
- President: Ronald Reagan; George H. W. Bush
- Preceded by: H. Stuart Knight
- Succeeded by: John Magaw

Personal details
- Born: February 13, 1932 Boston, Massachusetts, U.S.
- Died: February 10, 2017 (aged 84) Bowie, Maryland, U.S.

John Richard Simpson (February 13, 1932 – February 10, 2017) was the first U.S. Interpol President (1984–1988) and was the sixteenth Director of the United States Secret Service (1981–1992).

Born in 1932, Simpson served in the United States Army, graduated from Loyola College in Montreal before attending Portia Law School.

Simpson joined the Secret Service in 1962 during his time at Portia Law (graduating in 1964 and was elected as his Law School President) and became Special Agent with the Presidential Protective Division in 1978.

After retiring as Director in 1992, Simpson became a commissioner in the United States Parole Commission for 2 terms.
