= United States Secret Service Uniformed Division =

Division of the US Secret Service

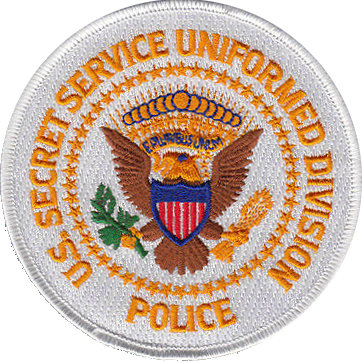
- Shoulder patch of the U.S. Secret Service Uniformed Division

- Badge of a USSS Uniformed Division officer

- Flag of the U.S. Secret Service (USSS Uniform Division has no flag)
- Common name: Secret Service Uniformed Division
- Abbreviation: USSSUD

Agency overview
- Formed: 1977
- Preceding agency: White House Police Force

Jurisdictional structure
- Federal agency: U.S.
- Operations jurisdiction: U.S.
- General nature: Federal law enforcement

Operational structure
- Headquarters: Washington, D.C.
- Officers: 1,300
- Agency executives: Sean M. Curran, USSS Director; Michael A. Buck, Chief
- Parent agency: U.S. Secret Service

Website
- secretservice.gov

The United States Secret Service Uniformed Division (USSS UD) is the federal police force of the U.S. Secret Service, similar to the U.S. Capitol Police, U.S. Supreme Court Police or DHS Federal Protective Service. It is in charge of protecting the physical White House grounds and foreign diplomatic missions in the District of Columbia area.

== History ==
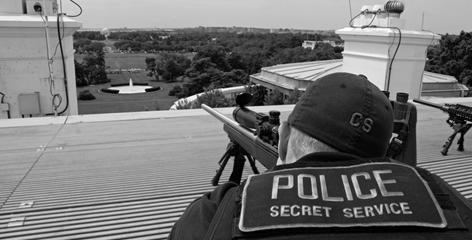
A U.S. Secret Service "counter-sniper" marksman on top of the White House's roof, armed with a sniper rifle

Established in 1922 as the White House Police, this organization was fully integrated into the Secret Service in 1930. In 1970, the protection of foreign diplomatic missions was added to the force's responsibilities, and its name was changed to the Executive Protective Service. The name United States Secret Service Uniformed Division was adopted in 1977.

In 1970, Phyllis Shantz became the first female officer sworn into the United States Secret Service Uniformed Division, then called the Executive Protective Service. In 1971, the first five official female Special Agents were sworn in - Laurie Anderson, Sue Baker, Kathryn Clark, Holly Hufschmidt, and Phyllis Shantz.

With more than 1,300 officers as of 2010, the Uniformed Division is responsible for security at the White House Complex; the vice president's residence; the Department of the Treasury (as part of the White House Complex); and foreign diplomatic missions in the District of Columbia area. Uniformed Division officers carry out their protective responsibilities through a network of fixed security posts, foot, bicycle, vehicular and motorcycle patrols.

== Organization ==
The Uniformed Division has three branches: the White House Branch, the Foreign Missions Branch and the Naval Observatory Branch supplemented by the Special Operations Division. Together they provide protection for the following: the president, vice president, and their immediate families; presidential candidates; the White House Complex; the Vice President's Residence; the main Treasury Department building and its annex facility; and foreign diplomatic missions in the Washington, D.C., metropolitan area.

Officers are responsible for providing additional support to the Secret Service's protective mission through the following Special Operations Division units:

Counter Assault Team (CAT)

Counter Sniper Team (CS)
Created in 1971, the Counter Sniper Team's purpose is to provide specialized protective support to defend against long-range threats to Secret Service protectees. Counter snipers work in pairs with one acting as a spotter. In 2016, CBS Evening News reported that no CS member had to fire a shot since the unit was formed.
In July 2024, the CS shot and killed Thomas Matthew Crooks who had attempted to assassinate Donald Trump, the Republican Party's then-presumptive nominee in the 2024 presidential election, at a campaign rally in Butler, Pennsylvania.

Canine Explosives Detection Unit (K-9)
Created in 1976, the mission of the K-9 unit is to provide skilled and specialized explosives detection support to protective efforts involving Secret Service protectees.

Emergency Response Team (ERT)
Created in 1985, ERT's primary mission is to provide tactical response to unlawful intrusions and other protective challenges related to the White House and its grounds. ERT personnel receive specialized, advanced training and must maintain a high level of physical and operational proficiency. The ERT includes the Specialized Rifle Unit. Since 2003, the ERT has included tactical K9 units.

Airspace Security Branch
Develops and implements security plans to monitor and control the airspace surrounding locations visited by the president and vice president of the United States, National Special Security Events and other designated major events.

Hazardous Agent Mitigation Medical Emergency Response (HAMMER)
Created in 2004, HAMMER supports the agency's protective mission through chemical, biological, radiological and nuclear (CBRN) detection and intervention, emergency medical support and rescue/extrication capabilities.

Technical Operations Branch

Officers assigned to CS, ERT, and K9, are designated "Technicians" to recognize their advanced training.

The Division also has the following other units:

Magnetometer Support Team
Formed to ensure that all persons entering secure areas occupied by Secret Service protectees are unarmed, the Secret Service began relying on magnetometer (metal detector) support by Uniformed Division officers to augment its protective efforts away from the White House following the attempt to assassinate President Ronald Reagan.

Crime Scene Search Unit
Photographs, collects, and processes physical and latent evidence.

Motorcade Support Unit
Specializes in the operational support for all official protectee motorcade movements.

Special Operations Section
Handles special duties and functions at the White House Complex, including conducting tours.

The Secret Service Uniformed Division's statutory authority is set out in Title 18, §3056A of the U.S. Code.

== Ranks ==
Counter Sniper team at the National Mall on the Fourth of July in 2026

Uniformed Division ranks, set out in the salary schedule in Title 5, § 10203 of the United States Code, are as follows:

- Chief
- Assistant Chief
- Deputy Chief
- Inspector
- Captain
- Lieutenant
- Sergeant
- Officer

== Current weapons ==
Like all other Secret Service personnel, the standard sidearm for the Uniformed Division is the 9mm Glock 19. Officers are trained on standard shoulder weapons that include the FN P90 submachine gun, the 9mm Heckler & Koch MP5 submachine gun, and the 12-gauge Remington 870 shotgun. The continued use of the MP5 remains a source of controversy as many other federal agencies have moved away from submachine guns altogether and replaced them with automatic rifles.

As a non-lethal option, Uniformed Division Officers are armed with the ASP 16" expandable baton, and Uniformed Division officers also carry pepper spray and X20-series tasers.

Units assigned to the Special Operations Branch carry a variety of non-standard weapons. The Emergency Response Team (ERT) is issued with the Knight's Armament Company SR-16 CQB rifle chambered in 5.56×45mm NATO.

Uniformed Division technicians assigned to the Counter Sniper Team use custom built .300 Winchester Magnum-chambered bolt-action rifles referred to as JARs ("Just Another Rifle"). These rifles use Remington 700 actions in Accuracy International stocks with Schmidt & Bender optics. CS technicians also use the 7.62mm Mk11 Mod 0 semi-automatic sniper rifle with a Trijicon 5.5× ACOG optic.
