= White House Police Force =

Defunct American security police force

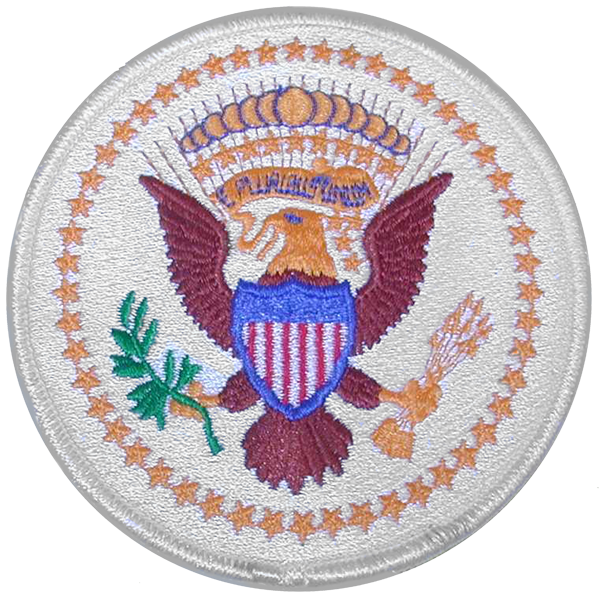
- White House Police patch, used as the basis for the patch of the Secret Service Uniformed Division.

Agency overview
- Formed: October 1, 1922
- Dissolved: 1930 (merged into the Secret Service)
- Superseding agency: United States Secret Service (Uniformed Division)

Jurisdictional structure
- National agency (Operations jurisdiction): US
- Federal agency (Operations jurisdiction): US
- Operations jurisdiction: US
- Legal jurisdiction: Federal (United States)
- General nature: Federal law enforcement; Civilian police

Operational structure
- Headquarters: White House, Washington D.C.
- Child agency: United States Secret Service (after 1930)

The White House Police Force was a security police force formed in 1922 to protect the White House and the president of the United States. It became part of the United States Secret Service in 1930. It was renamed the Executive Protective Service in 1970 and then the Uniformed Division of the Secret Service in 1977.

== History ==
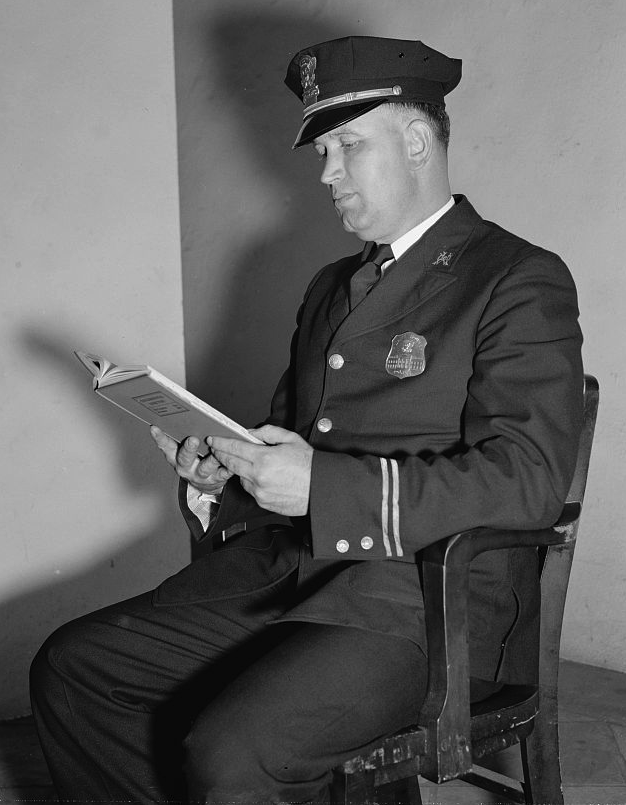
White House Police officer Ira Lee Law, circa 1938

The White House Police Force was created on October 1, 1922, at the request of President Warren G. Harding to provide police and security services to the White House and Executive Office Building. Initially the President or his appointed representative supervised the force.

The White House Police Force was placed under the command of the chief of the United States Secret Service in 1930. In 1970, it became the Executive Protective Service and its roles and size were expanded. Its responsibilities now included the protection of the White House, foreign missions in and around Washington, D.C., and the Naval Observatory. Together they provide protection for the following: The president and vice president of the United States and their immediate families, presidential candidates, the White House Complex, the Vice President's Residence, and foreign diplomatic missions in the Washington, D.C., metropolitan area.

A White House Police officer wearing the Nixon-era uniform

The uniforms were updated by President Richard Nixon in 1970 after he was inspired by a trip to Europe. Nixon wanted a new dress for formal state occasions. The uniform was debuted on January 28, 1970, receiving a negative reception from the press and public. The uniform was retired in the mid-1970's, eventually being bought as a marching band uniform for the Meriden-Cleghorn Community School District.

The Executive Protective Service became the Uniformed Division of the Secret Service in 1977. When the United States Treasury Police was merged into the Uniformed Division of the Secret Service in 1986 it became responsible for the main Treasury building and the Treasury Annex building, both of which are adjacent to the White House.

== Fatality ==
Since the establishment of the White House Police, one officer has died in the line of duty.

Officer	Date of death	Details
Officer Leslie William Coffelt	Wednesday, November 1, 1950	Shot in the Truman assassination attempt

== See also ==
- List of United States federal law enforcement agencies
- Federal Police

== Bibliography ==
- Donald A. Torres (1985). Handbook of Federal Police and Investigative Agencies. Greenwood Press. ISBN 0-313-24578-9 and ISBN 978-0-313-24578-7
