= European Electronic Crime Task Force =

- Founded: June 30, 2009
- Founder: United States Secret Service; Polizia Postale e delle Comunicazioni - Polizia di Stato; Poste Italiane
- Type: Information Sharing Working Group
- Purpose: Electronic Crimes in Europe
- Location: Rome
- Members: 3 Founder Members; 19 Permanent Members; Community of Experts (more than 400 professionals)
- Key people: Vanes Montanari, VP Security and Safety Poste Italiane - EECTF Chairman

The European Electronic Crime Task Force (EECTF) is an information sharing initiative, created in 2009 by an agreement between the United States Secret Service, the Italian Ministry of Internal Affairs and Poste Italiane. The EECTF's mission is "to support the analysis and the development of best practices against cybercrime in European countries, through the creation of a strategic alliance between public and private sectors, including law enforcement, the financial sector, academia, international institutions, and ICT security vendors".

Accordingly, the EECTF aims to help the cyber security community by:

- Strengthening relationships between the different players;
- Training and supporting members through sharing expertise and knowledge;
- Enabling an effective communication channel for information exchange;
- Maintaining co-operation on a technical and operational level.

== History ==
The EECTF was established on June 30, 2009, by an agreement between the United States Secret Service, the Italian Ministry of Internal Affairs and Poste Italiane, on the basis of the successful experiences of analogous ECTFs founded in the US by the Secret Service.

The United States Secret Service participates through its Rome office, the Italian Ministry of Interior participates through the Service of Postal and Telecommunications Police and Poste Italiane participates through the Information Security Department.

Initially restricted only to the only Founder Members, the EECTF was opened up thereafter to the main stakeholders in cybercrime, who expressed the will to contribute to a proactive sharing of relevant information. A Permanent Members Group has been started, which gathers to analyze emerging trends in cyber-crime and to discuss methodologies and techniques to combat them.

== Governance ==
The EECTF is not a legal entity, it is a working group created on a voluntary basis, which has been governed since its creation by the EECTF Board made up of the three Founder Members: the United States Secret Service, represented by the special agent in charge of the Rome office, the Polizia Postale e delle Comunicazioni, represented by the head of service and Poste Italiane, represented by the CEO. Poste Italiane has chaired the EECTF Board since its inception. The chairman of the EECTF is Mr. Vanes Montanari, VP Security and Safety at Poste Italiane.

Administrative and operational activities are accomplished by the EECTF Technical Secretariat, held by Poste Italiane.

== Modus operandi ==
The EECTF is run via monthly meetings of a select group of permanent members, quarterly open events extended to a wide community of selected experts and continuous sharing of information relevant to cybercrime and through dedicated specific tools.

Permanent members include internationally acknowledged organizations, both private and public, with a broad view on prevention, analysis and contrast of electronic crimes at European level, whose competencies might represent instances coming from whole domains of interest.

Permanent Members formally commit to proactively share information with other members of the group in a non-competitive environment, according to a non-disclosure agreement, and to actively contribute to the EECTF's activities, taking part to meetings and supporting the EECTF's development.

Additionally, in order to make the most out of the competencies of the whole EECTF community, an Expert Group has been started, which gathers on a periodic basis and is restricted to Permanent Members. It focuses on technical information sharing about new threats and possible countermeasures.

== Constituency ==
The EECTF is made up of the following organizations:

Member	Sector	Country	Status	Since
ABI Lab	Research and Innovation	Italy	Permanent Member	2013
American Express	Payment Systems and Financial Services	Italy	Permanent Member	2010
Bulgarian Police	Law Enforcement Agencies	Bulgaria	Permanent Member	2011
CA Technologies	ICT Private Sector	Italy	Permanent Member	2012
Consip	Public Administration	Italy	Permanent Member	2013
Citibank	Payment Systems and Financial Services	United States	Permanent Member	2011
Global Cyber Security Center	Research and Innovation	Italy	Permanent Member	2010
Italian Ministry of Economy and Finance	Public Administration	Italy	Permanent Member	2011
Kaspersky Great	ICT Private Sector	Romania / Italy	Permanent Member	2011
MasterCard	Payment Systems and Financial Services	Italy	Permanent Member	2012
NTT Data	ICT Private Sector	Italy	Permanent Member	2013
Polizia Postale e delle Comunicazioni - Polizia di Stato	Law Enforcement Agencies	Italy	Founder Member	2009
Poste Italiane	Payment Systems and Financial Services	Italy	Founder Member and Chairman	2009
Romanian Police	Law Enforcement Agencies	Romania	Permanent Member	2011
RSA - EMC2	ICT Private Sector	United States / Italy	Permanent Member	2010
Selex ES	ICT Private Sector	Italy	Permanent Member	2013
Symantec	ICT Private Sector	Italy	Permanent Member	2011
UniCredit	Payment Systems and Financial Services	Italy	Permanent Member	2012
UNICRI - United Nations Interregional Crime and Justice Research Institute	Research and Innovation	Global	Permanent Member	2011
United States Secret Service	Law Enforcement Agencies	United States	Founder Member	2009
Verizon	ICT Private Sector	United States	Permanent member	2010
Visa Europe	Payment Systems and Financial Services	UK	Permanent Member	2011

== EECTF Community and Plenary Meetings ==
With the aim of aggregating all the potentially valuable stakeholders, an invitation-only Community of Experts has been set up as a public interface of the Permanent Members Group. It is made up of acknowledged professionals and organizations who are distinguished as active contributors in the field of prevention and contrast of electronic crime. The EECTF gathers in periodic plenary meetings, organized to focus on general trends in cybercrime and security issues of current interest. More than 10 Plenary Meetings have been organized so far, as listed below.

Plenary Meetings
I	June 30, 2009	The European Electronic Crime Task Force
II	March 16, 2010	Successful Cybercrime Investigations
III	June 24, 2010	International Funds Transfer and cooperation with LEAs
IV	February 10, 2011	Trends in Cybercrime and Cyberthreats: Europe and the United States
V	May 18, 2011	Identity theft: Malware, Botnet & Social Networking
VI	November 15, 2011	Cybercrime Underground Economy
VII	March 6, 2012	Advanced Persistent Threats: Attacks to Corporate Information Systems
VIII	July 18, 2012	Secure Identities in Cyberspace
IX	November 29, 2012	Security of Innovative Payment Systems
X	April 23, 2013	CERTs and International Cooperation Networks
XI	November 5, 2013	Security of Internet Payments and Online Services
XII	March 31, 2015	New Trends in Cyber Crime

Past speakers include:

- APWG - AntiPhishing Working Group
- CERT-EU
- ENISA - European Union Agency for Network and Information Security
- European Commission
- European Payments Council
- Europol
- Italian Data Protection Authority
- Italian Ministry of Economy and Finance
- Italian Ministry of Internal Affairs
- UNICRI - United Nations Interregional Crime and Justice Research Institute
- United States Secret Service
- US Ambassador to Italy

Additionally, a monthly newsletter, CyberNews, is published within the community, to point out the most relevant events and trends in the cybercrime scenario.

== See also ==
- United States Secret Service
- USSS Electronic Crimes Task Forces - Rome
- Poste italiane
- Polizia Postale e delle Comunicazioni - Polizia di Stato
