= James J. Rowley Training Center =

Training center operated by the United States Secret Service

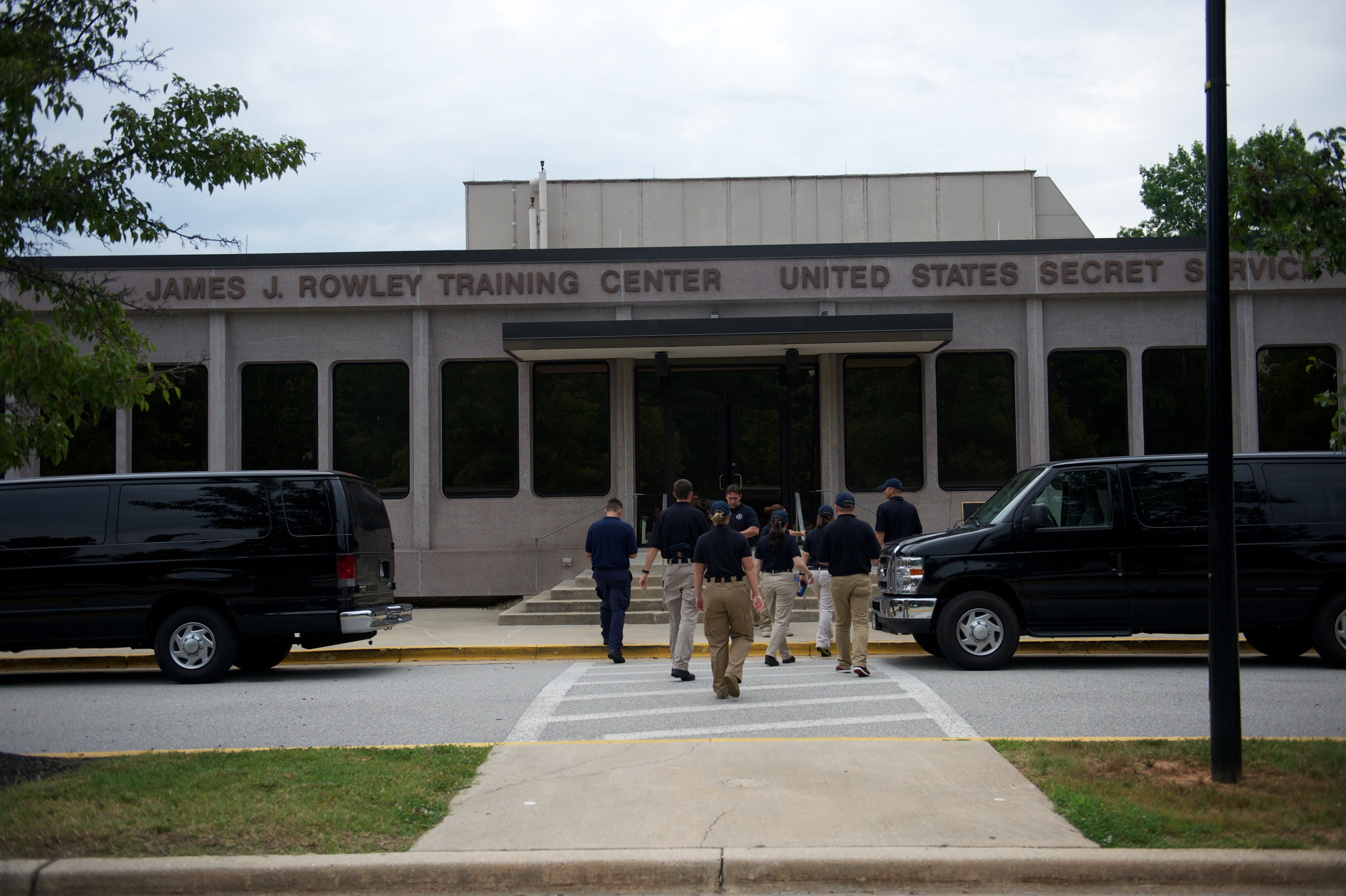

General information
- Location: 9200 Powder Mill Rd; Laurel, Maryland postal address, 20708
- Coordinates: 39.0360°N 76.8427°W
- Opened: 1972
- Owner: United States Secret Service

The James J. Rowley Training Center (JJRTC, RTC, or Secret Service Training Academy) is the law enforcement training center operated by the United States Secret Service just outside Washington, D.C., in South Laurel, Maryland, near Laurel. It is named after former director James Joseph Rowley.

The site is adjacent to the Henry A. Wallace Beltsville Agricultural Research Center and the Patuxent Wildlife Research Center. Additionally, the site is located 3,000 meters from Snowden Pond located at the aforementioned agricultural research center.

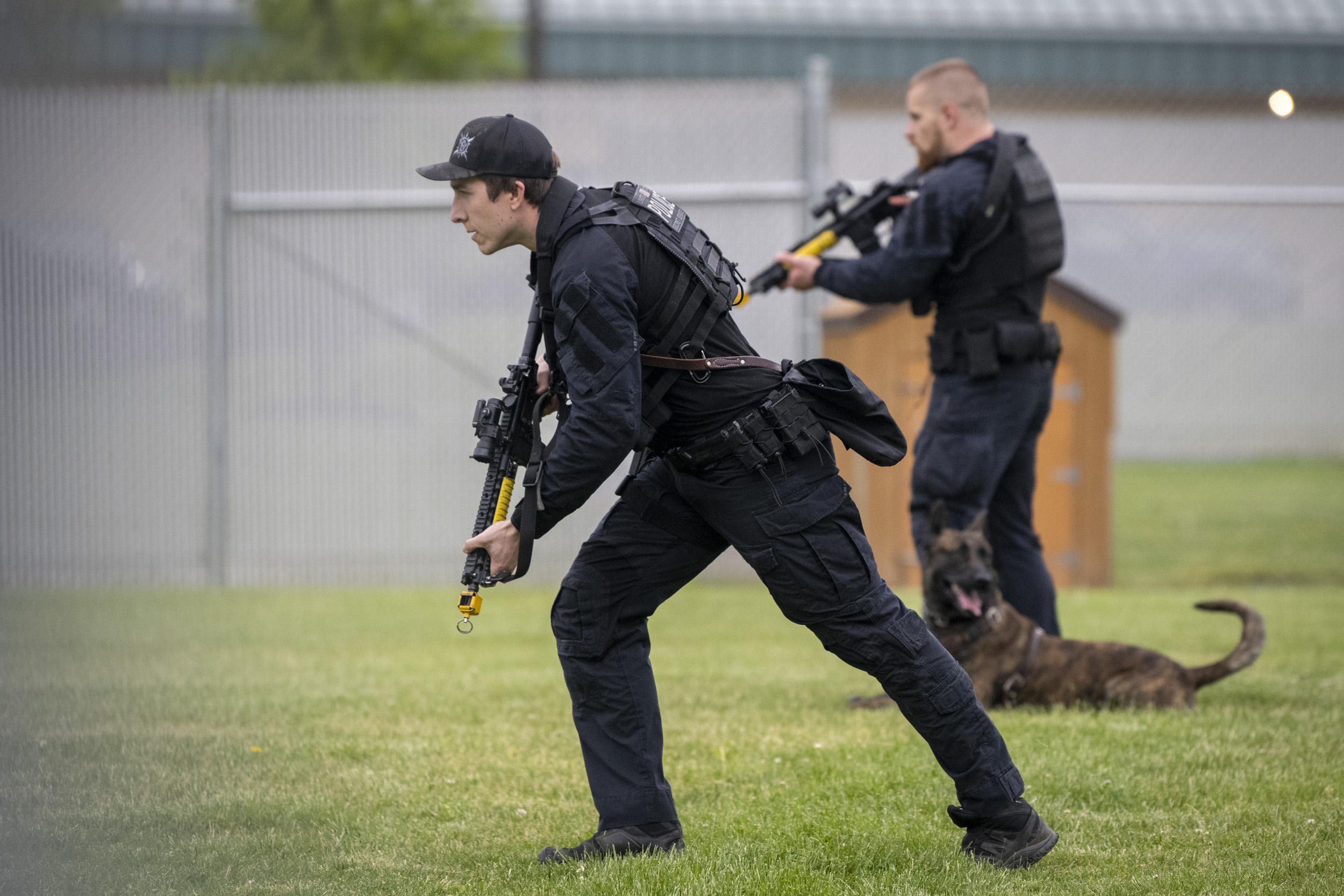
Secret Service officers in training at the JJRTC.

== History ==
The JJRTC was developed in 1969 as part of the consolidated Federal Law Enforcement Training Centers (FLETC). The National Capital Planning Commission approved the preliminary site and building plans for the primary administration structure of the JJRTC in 1972. In 1978, consolidated federal law enforcement functions were transferred to Glynco, Georgia, and the Secret Service obtained exclusive use of the Beltsville site.

== Training activities ==
For Secret Service special agents, the training focuses on Secret Service policies and procedures associated with the dual responsibilities of investigations and protection. Trainees are provided with basic knowledge and advanced application training in combating counterfeiting, access device fraud and other financial criminal activity, protective intelligence investigations, physical protection techniques, protective advances and emergency medicine. The core curriculum is augmented with training in marksmanship, control tactics, water survival skills and physical fitness.

For Secret Service officers, training focuses on coursework in police procedures, firearms, physical fitness, psychology, police-community relations, criminal law, first aid, laws of arrest, search and seizure, physical defense techniques, diplomatic immunity, international treaties and protocol. On-the-job training and advanced in-service training programs are used along with classroom studies.

Secret Service agents and officers receive training throughout their careers. In part, this training consists of regular firearms re-qualification and emergency medicine refresher courses. Agents assigned to protective assignments also participate in crisis training simulations that present agents with a variety of "real world" emergency situations. Agents assigned to offices in the field are able to acquire advanced training in the area of criminal investigations and to attend training sessions sponsored by other law enforcement agencies.

All Secret Service employees participate in management and individual development courses. Ethics, diversity, interpersonal awareness, practical leadership and introduction to supervision are among the topics currently offered.

== James J. Rowling Master Plan 2017 ==
The Secret Service submitted the 2017 James J. Rowley Training Center final master plan for review. The JJRTC has a 439-acre, federally owned property in Prince George's County, Maryland, approximately 2.5 miles outside the Capital Beltway. The commission last approved the installation master plan in December 2012. The update revises the previous plan to include the addition of the Defense Tactical Facilities (DTF), which will include one building and site improvements for training purposes to address current mission threats.

The master plan continues to include the following planning objectives:

- Utilize the campus more effectively and efficiently
- Provide needed space for specialized programs, classrooms, and conference use
- Provide functional physical fitness facilities
- Accommodate external and intra-campus transportation
- Differentiate secured areas from non-secured public areas to promote flexible use
- Establish architectural design guidelines to achieve coherent architectural and environmental development campus-wide
- Identify the initial projects to be developed under the Master Plan and plan for incremental development of the campus
- Develop initial costs for phased development
- Coordinate with regional review agencies, including NCPC and the Maryland-National Capital Park and Planning Commission (M-NCPPC)

The 2017 RTC Master Plan update includes one major change: the addition of new Defense Tactical Facilities (DTF) comprising a 150,000 square foot building and site improvements that total approximately 40 acres. Since there was no previously disturbed land available for the location of this new facility, the USSS sited it in close proximity to other developed parts of the campus. Therefore, staff recommends the commission support the selected site for the DTF as it is adjacent to existing development on the campus. Further, staff recommends the commission support the goals and objectives of the 2017 RTC Final Master Plan.
