= James Joseph Rowley =

Director of the United States Secret Service (1908–1992)

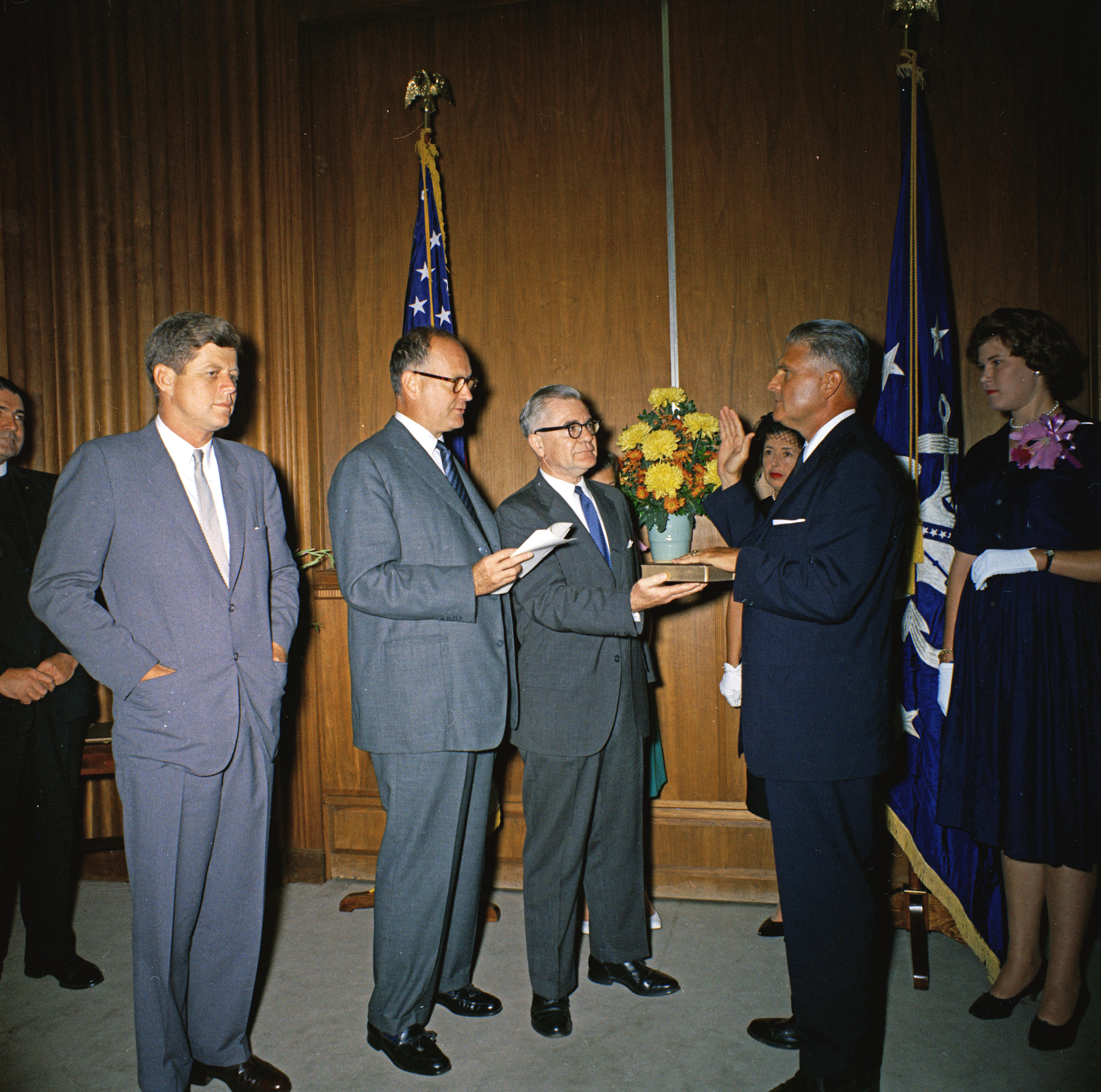
- Rowley being sworn-in as Secret Service Chief, 1961

14th Director of the United States Secret Service
- In office September 1, 1961 – October 1973
- President: John F. Kennedy; Lyndon B. Johnson; Richard Nixon
- Preceded by: U.E. Baughman
- Succeeded by: H. Stuart Knight

Personal details
- Born: October 14, 1908 Bronx County, New York, U.S.
- Died: November 1, 1992 (aged 84) Leisure World, Maryland, U.S.
- Resting place: Gate of Heaven Cemetery; Silver Spring, Maryland
- Spouse: Mabel Rita Cluen (m. 1940)
- Children: 3
- Parent(s): James J. Rowley; Bridget Theresa McTeague

James Joseph Rowley (October 14, 1908 – November 1, 1992) was the head of the United States Secret Service between 1961 and 1973, under presidents Kennedy, Johnson, and Nixon.

Rowley was born in Bronx County, New York to James J. Rowley and Bridget Theresa McTeague. His parents were Irish immigrants who met in New York City and were married in Manhattan.

Rowley began working for the Secret Service in 1938 during the days of Franklin D. Roosevelt's administration, after first joining the FBI in 1936. On June 18, 1964, Rowley provided testimony to the Warren Commission investigating the assassination of John F. Kennedy. After the assassination, Secret Service training was regularized and systematized. The James J. Rowley Training Center in Beltsville, Maryland, is named after him. Rowley died of congestive heart failure at his home in Leisure World, Maryland.

Preceded by U.E. Baughman	Chief, United States Secret Service; September 1, 1961 – 1965	Succeeded by Himself (as Director)
Preceded by Himself (as Chief)	Director, United States Secret Service; 1965 – October 1973	Succeeded by H. Stuart Knight
