= United States Secret Service =

Federal law enforcement agency

- Emblem of the U.S. Secret Service

- Secret Service special agent badge

- U.S. Secret Service flag
- Common name: Secret Service
- Abbreviation: USSS

Agency overview
- Formed: July 5, 1865; 161 years ago
- Employees: 8,300+ (2024)
- Annual budget: US$3.2 billion (2025)

Jurisdictional structure
- Operations jurisdiction: United States

Operational structure
- Headquarters: Washington, D.C., U.S.
- Agency executives: Sean M. Curran, Director; Matthew C. Quinn, Deputy Director
- Parent agency: U.S. Department of Homeland Security (2003–present); U.S. Department of the Treasury (1865–2003)

Facilities
- Field and resident offices: 116
- Overseas offices: 20

Website
- secretservice.gov

The United States Secret Service (USSS or Secret Service) is a federal law enforcement agency under the United States Department of Homeland Security. It is tasked with conducting criminal investigations and providing protection to American political leaders, their families, and visiting heads of state or government.

The Secret Service was, until 2003, part of the United States Department of the Treasury, due to their initial mandate of combating counterfeiting of United States currency. The agency has protected United States presidents and presidential candidates since 1901.

== Primary missions ==
The Secret Service is mandated by Congress with two distinct and critical national security missions: protecting the nation's leaders and safeguarding the financial and critical infrastructure of the United States.

=== Protective mission ===
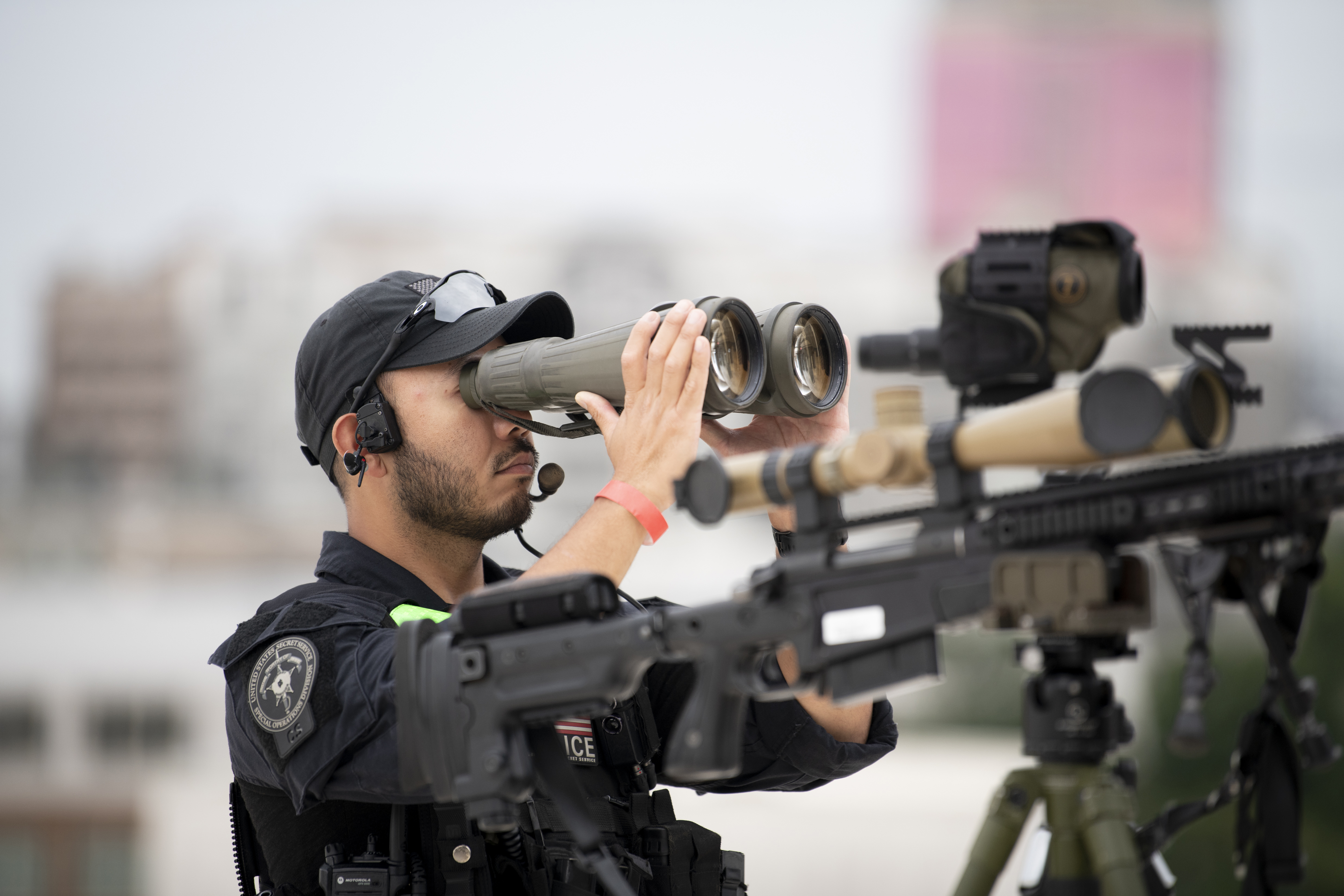
A Counter Sniper team member provides long range security in support of a Presidential visit at the Republican National Convention.

The Secret Service is tasked with ensuring the safety of the president, the vice president, the president-elect, the vice president–elect, and their immediate families; former presidents, their spouses and their children under the age of 16; those in the presidential line of succession, major presidential and vice-presidential candidates and their spouses; and visiting foreign heads of state and heads of government. By custom, it also provides protection to the secretary of the treasury and secretary of homeland security, as well as other people as directed by the president (usually the White House chief of staff and national security advisor, among others). Former Secret Service director Kimberly Cheatle told the congressional oversight committee that as of July 22, 2024 the secret service has a total of 36 protectees. By federal statute, the president and vice president may not refuse this protection. The Secret Service also provides physical security for the White House Complex; the neighboring Treasury Department building; the vice president's residence; the principal private residences of the president, vice president and former presidents; and all foreign diplomatic missions in Washington, D.C. The protective mission includes protective operations to coordinate manpower and logistics with state and local law enforcement in the US, protective advances to conduct site and venue assessments for protectees, and protective intelligence to investigate all manners of threats made against protectees. The Secret Service is the lead agency in charge of the planning, coordination, and implementation of security operations for events designated as National Special Security Events (NSSE). As part of the service's mission of preventing an incident before it occurs, the agency relies on advance work and threat assessments developed by its Intelligence Division to identify potential risks to protectees.

=== Investigative mission ===
The Secret Service is tasked with safeguarding the payment and financial systems of the United States from a wide range of financial and cyber-based crimes. Financial investigations include counterfeit U.S. currency, bank and financial institution fraud, mail fraud, wire fraud, illicit financing operations, and major conspiracies. Cyber investigations include cybercrime, network intrusions, identity theft, access device fraud, credit card fraud, and intellectual property crimes. The Secret Service is also a member of the FBI's Joint Terrorism Task Force (JTTF), which investigates and combats terrorism on a national and international scale. Also, the Secret Service investigates missing and exploited children and is a partner of the National Center for Missing & Exploited Children (NCMEC).

The Secret Service's initial responsibility was to investigate the counterfeiting of U.S. currency, which was rampant following the American Civil War. The agency then evolved into the United States' first domestic intelligence and counterintelligence agency. Many of the agency's missions were later taken over by subsequent agencies such as the Federal Bureau of Investigation (FBI), Central Intelligence Agency (CIA), Drug Enforcement Administration (DEA), Bureau of Alcohol, Tobacco, Firearms, and Explosives (ATF), and IRS Criminal Investigation Division (IRS-CI).

The Secret Service is also tasked with investigating reports of the existence of specimens of the extremely rare 1933 double eagle gold coin, as only a single example of the thirteen known survivors from this mintage year is authorized to be owned or sold.

=== Dual objective ===
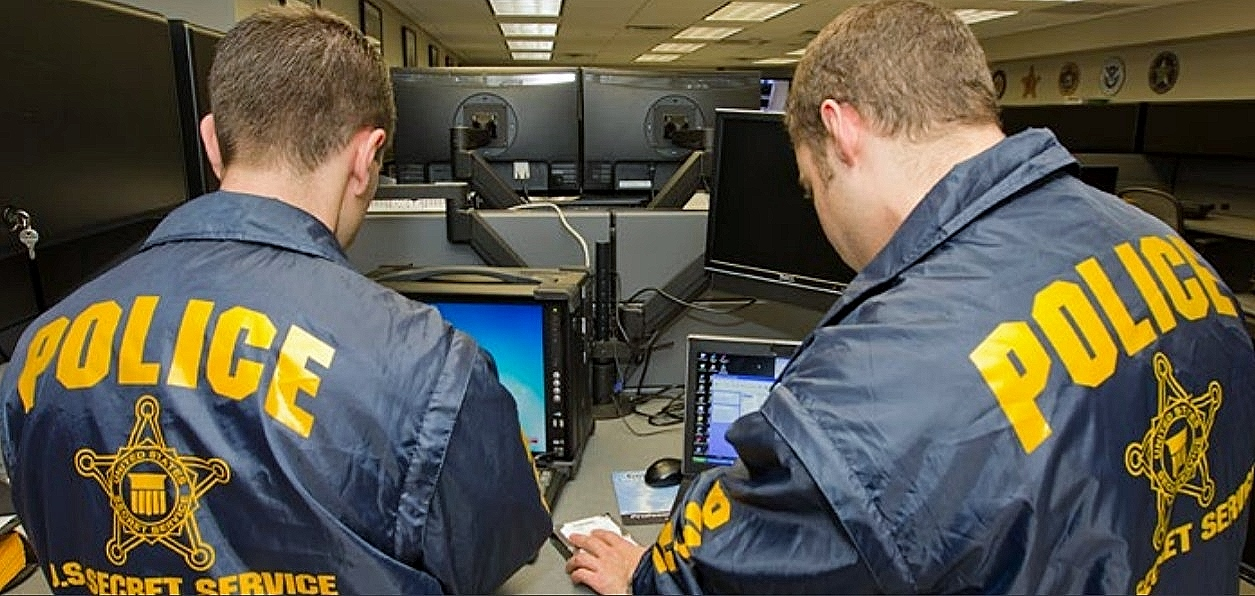
Secret Service agents conducting electronic investigations

The Secret Service combines the two responsibilities into a dual objective. The two core missions of protection and investigation synergize with each other, providing benefits to special agents during the course of their careers. Skills developed during the course of investigations which are also used in an agent's protective duties include but are not limited to:

- Partnerships that are created between field offices and local law enforcement during the course of investigations being used to gather both protective intelligence and in coordinating protection events.
- Tactical operation (e.g., surveillance, arrests, and search warrants) and law enforcement writing (e.g., affidavits, after-action reports, and operations plans) skills being applied to both investigative and protective duties.
- Proficiency in analyzing handwriting and forgery techniques being applied in protective investigations of handwritten letters and suspicious-package threats.
- Expertise in investigating electronic and financial crimes being applied in protective investigations of threats made against the nation's leaders on the Internet.

Protection of the nation's highest elected leaders and other government officials is one of the primary missions of the Secret Service. After the 1901 assassination of President William McKinley, Congress directed the Secret Service to protect the president of the United States. The Secret Service investigates thousands of incidents each year of individuals threatening the president of the United States.

The Secret Service is authorized by 18 U.S.C. § 3056(a) to protect:

- The president, vice president (or the next individual in the order of succession, should the vice presidency be vacant), president-elect and vice president–elect
- The immediate families of the above individuals
- Former presidents and their spouses for their lifetimes, except if the spouse remarries
- Children of former presidents under the age of 16
- Visiting heads of state or government and their spouses traveling with them
- Other distinguished foreign visitors to the United States and official representatives of the United States performing special missions abroad, when the president directs protection be provided
- Major presidential and vice presidential candidates and, within 120 days of a general presidential election, their spouses
- Former vice presidents, their spouses, and their children under 16 years of age, for up to six months from the date the former vice president leaves office (the Secretary of Homeland Security can authorize temporary protection of these individuals at any time after that period)

In addition to the above, the Secret Service can also protect other individuals by executive order of the president. Under Presidential Policy Directive 22, "National Special Security Events" (NSSE), the Secret Service is the lead agency for the design and implementation of operational security plans for events designated an NSSE by the secretary of homeland security.

Sign at the Obama family home in 2021 stating the area is protected by the Secret Service

There have been changes to the protection of former presidents over time. Under the original Former Presidents Act, former presidents and their spouses were entitled to lifetime protection, subject to limited exceptions. In 1994, this was amended to reduce the protection period to 10 years after a former president left office, starting with presidents assuming the role after January 1, 1997. On January 10, 2013, President Barack Obama signed legislation reversing this limit and reinstating lifetime protection to all former presidents. This change impacted Presidents Obama and G. W. Bush, as well as all future presidents.

Protection of government officials is not solely the responsibility of the Secret Service, with many other agencies, such as the United States Capitol Police, Supreme Court Police and Diplomatic Security Service, providing personal protective services to domestic and foreign officials. However, while these agencies are nominally responsible for services to other officers of the United States and senior dignitaries, the Secret Service provides protective services at the highest-level – i.e. for heads of state and heads of government.

The Secret Service's other primary mission is investigative; to protect the payment and financial systems of the United States from a wide range of financial and electronic-based crimes including counterfeit U.S. currency, bank and financial institution fraud, illicit financing operations, cybercrime, identity theft, intellectual property crimes, and any other violations that may affect the United States economy and financial systems. The agency's key focus is on large, high-dollar economic impact cases involving organized criminal groups. Financial criminals include embezzling bank employees, armed robbers at automatic teller machines, heroin traffickers, and criminal organizations that commit bank fraud on a global scale.

The USSS plays a leading role in facilitating relationships between other law enforcement entities, the private sector, and academia. The service maintains the Electronic Crimes Task Forces, which focus on identifying and locating international cyber criminals connected to cyber intrusions, bank fraud, data breaches, and other computer-related crimes.

Additionally, the Secret Service runs the National Computer Forensics Institute (NCFI), authorized by the Strengthening State and Local Cyber Crime Fighting Act of 2017, which provides law enforcement officers, prosecutors, and judges with cyber training and information to combat cybercrime. NCFI awarded Oxygen Forensics a five-year software contract in September 2024. The United States Department of Justice says Oxygen Forensics CEO Lee Reiber and Russian national Oleg Sergeyevich Davydov were arrested and charged with conspiracy to commit wire fraud in an alleged scheme to hide the company's Russian ownership and software team location.

In the face of budget pressure, hiring challenges and some high-profile lapses in its protective service role in 2014, the Brookings Institution and some members of Congress are asking whether the agency's focus should shift more to the protective mission,and leaving more of its original mission to other agencies.

== History ==
=== Early years ===
Logo of the United States Secret Service

During the Civil War, counterfeiting of U.S. currency was a problem. Abraham Lincoln established a commission to make recommendations to remedy the problem. According to a White House archive, the day that Abraham Lincoln approved the creation of the agency, he was shot. The Secret Service was established on July 5, 1865, as the "Secret Service Division" of the Department of the Treasury with the mission of suppressing counterfeiting. Chief William P. Wood was sworn in by Secretary of the Treasury Hugh McCulloch. At the time, the only other federal law enforcement agencies were the U.S. Post Office Department's Office of Instructions and Mail Depredations (originally created by the first postmaster general, Benjamin Franklin, in 1772 as the position of surveyor and becoming an agency in 1830, now known as the United States Postal Inspection Service since 1954), United States Customs Service (formed July 31, 1789), the United States Marshals Service (formed September 24, 1789) and the United States Park Police (originally formed in 1791 as the Park Watchman by George Washington and becoming the Park Police on December 14, 1919). In 1867 Secret Service responsibilities were broadened to include "detecting persons perpetrating frauds against the government" with them investigating the Ku Klux Klan, illegal distillers, smugglers, mail theft and land fraud. In 1870 Secret Service headquarters was moved to New York City but was returned to Washington, D.C. four years later in 1874, where it remains to this day.

=== 20th century; Presidential Security mandate added ===
After the assassination of President William McKinley in 1901, Congress informally requested that the Secret Service provide presidential protection. A year later, the Secret Service assumed full-time responsibility for presidential protection. In 1902, William Craig became the first Secret Service agent to die while on duty, in a road accident while riding in the presidential carriage.

The Secret Service was the first U.S. domestic intelligence and counterintelligence agency. Domestic intelligence collection and counterintelligence responsibilities were later vested in the Federal Bureau of Investigation (FBI).

==== Taft Mexican Summit (1909) ====
In 1909, President William H. Taft agreed to meet with Mexican president Porfirio Díaz in El Paso, Texas, and Ciudad Juárez, Chihuahua, the first meeting between a U.S. and a Mexican president and also the first time an American president visited Mexico. The historic summit resulted in serious assassination threats and other security concerns for the nascent Secret Service, so the Texas Rangers, 4,000 U.S. and Mexican troops, BOI agents, U.S. Marshals, and an additional 250-man private security detail led by Frederick Russell Burnham, the celebrated scout, were all called in by Chief John Wilkie to provide added security. On October 16, the day of the summit, Burnham discovered a man holding a concealed palm pistol standing at the El Paso Chamber of Commerce building along the procession route. The man was captured and disarmed only a few feet from Díaz and Taft.

==== 1920s ====
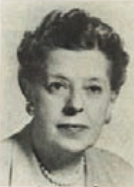
First female operative Florence Bolan

The first unofficial female special agent was Florence Bolan. She joined the service in 1917. In 1924, Bolan was promoted to operative (the title preceding special agent) where she performed duties, such as searching female prisoners and engaging in occasional fieldwork.

==== 1940s ====
The Secret Service assisted in arresting Japanese American leaders and in the Japanese American internment during World War II.

==== 1950s ====
In 1950, President Harry S. Truman was residing in Blair House while the White House, across the street, was undergoing renovations. On November 1, 1950, two Puerto Rican nationalists, Oscar Collazo and Griselio Torresola, approached Blair House with the intent to assassinate President Truman. Collazo and Torresola opened fire on Private Leslie Coffelt and other White House Police officers. Though mortally wounded by three shots from a 9 mm German Luger to his chest and abdomen, Private Coffelt returned fire, killing Torresola with a single shot to his head. Collazo was also shot, but survived his injuries and served 29 years in prison before returning to Puerto Rico in late 1979. Coffelt is the only member of the Secret Service killed while protecting a US president against an assassination attempt (Special Agent Tim McCarthy stepped in front of President Ronald Reagan during the assassination attempt of March 30, 1981, and took a bullet to the chest but made a full recovery).

==== 1960s ====
In 1968, as a result of Robert F. Kennedy's assassination, Congress authorized protection of major presidential and vice presidential candidates and nominees. In 1965 and 1968, Congress also authorized lifetime protection of the spouses of deceased presidents unless they remarry and of the children of former presidents until age 16.

==== 1970s ====
In 1970, Phyllis Shantz became the first female officer sworn into the United States Secret Service Uniformed Division, then called the Executive Protective Service. In 1971, the first five official female special agents were sworn in - Laurie Anderson, Sue Baker, Kathryn Clark, Holly Hufschmidt, and Phyllis Shantz.

==== 1980s ====
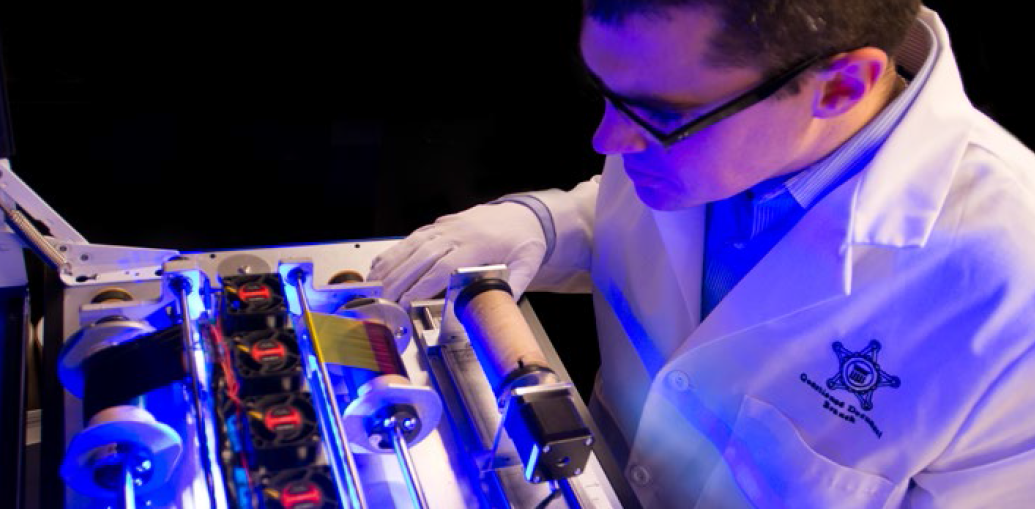
Secret Service analyst examining counterfeit documents

In 1984, the US Congress passed the Comprehensive Crime Control Act, which extended the Secret Service's jurisdiction over credit card fraud and computer fraud.

==== 1990s ====
In 1990, the Secret Service initiated Operation Sundevil, which they originally intended as a sting against malicious hackers, allegedly responsible for disrupting telephone services across the entire United States. The operation, which was later described by Bruce Sterling in his book The Hacker Crackdown, affected a great number of people unrelated to hacking, and led to no convictions. The Secret Service, however, was sued and required to pay damages. On March 1, 1990, the Secret Service served a search warrant on Steve Jackson Games, a small company in Austin, Texas, seizing three computers and over 300 floppy disks. In the subsequent lawsuit, the judge reprimanded the Secret Service, calling their warrant preparation "sloppy."

In 1994 and 1995, it ran an undercover sting called Operation Cybersnare. The Secret Service has concurrent jurisdiction with the FBI over certain violations of federal computer crime laws. They have created 24 Electronic Crimes Task Forces (ECTFs) across the United States. These task forces are partnerships between the service, federal/state and local law enforcement, the private sector and academia aimed at combating technology-based crimes.

In 1998, President Bill Clinton signed Presidential Decision Directive 62, which established National Special Security Events (NSSE). That directive made the Secret Service responsible for security at designated events. In 1999, the United States Secret Service Memorial Building was dedicated in DC, granting the agency its first headquarters. Prior to this, the agency's different departments were based in office space around the DC area. The General Services Administration acquired the United States Secret Service Memorial Building's adjoining property, the Webster School, for the Secret Service.

=== 2000s ===
==== September 11 attacks ====
The New York City Field office was located at 7 World Trade Center. Immediately after the World Trade Center was attacked as part of the September 11 attacks, special agents and other New York Field office employees were among the first to respond with first aid. Sixty-seven special agents in New York City, at and near the New York Field Office, helped to set up triage areas and evacuate the towers. One Secret Service employee, Master Special Officer Craig Miller, died during the rescue efforts. On August 20, 2002, Director Brian L. Stafford awarded the Director's Valor Award to employees who assisted in the rescue attempts.

==== Domestic expansion ====
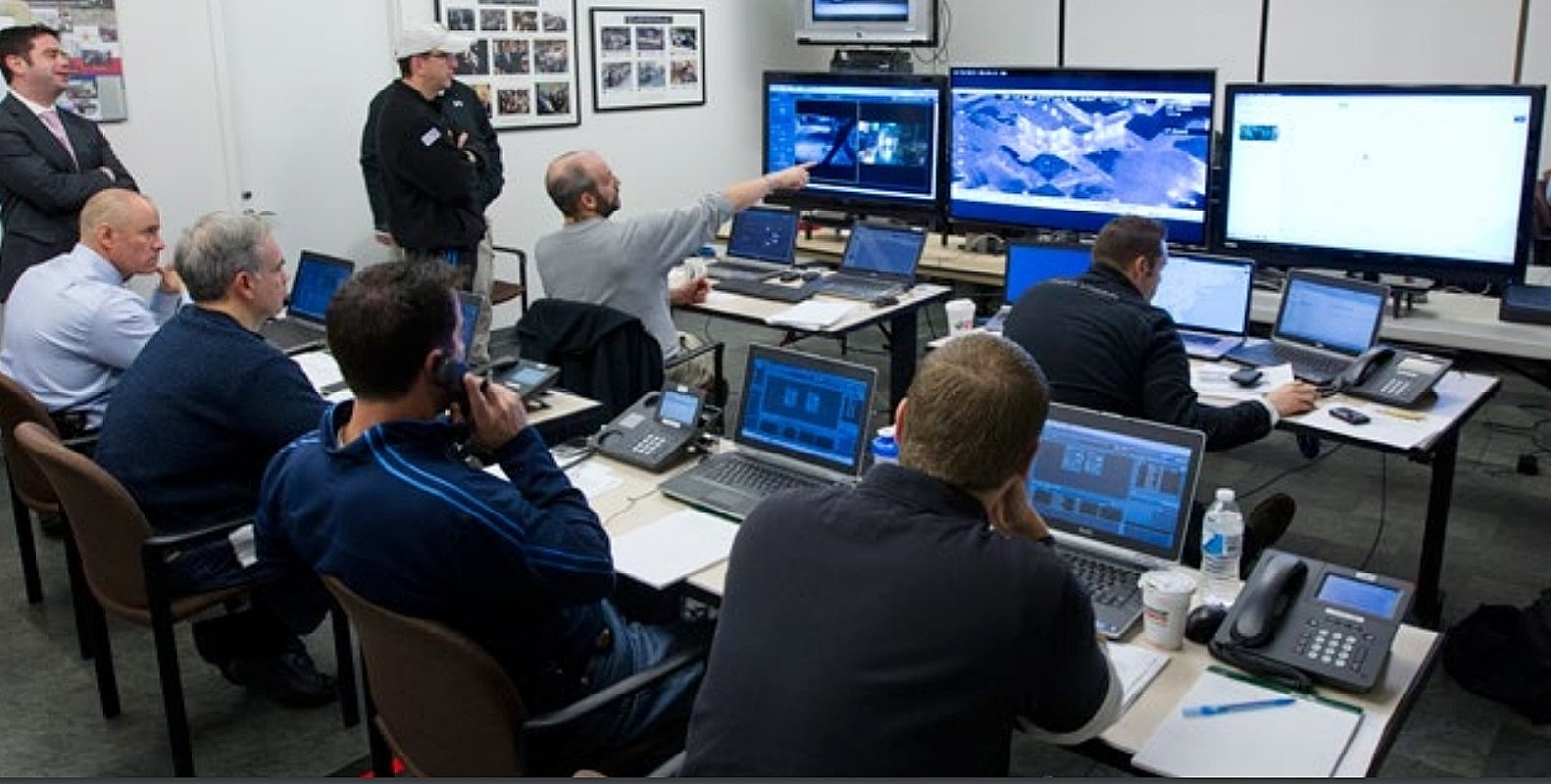
Secret Service Electronic Crimes Task Force (ECTF)

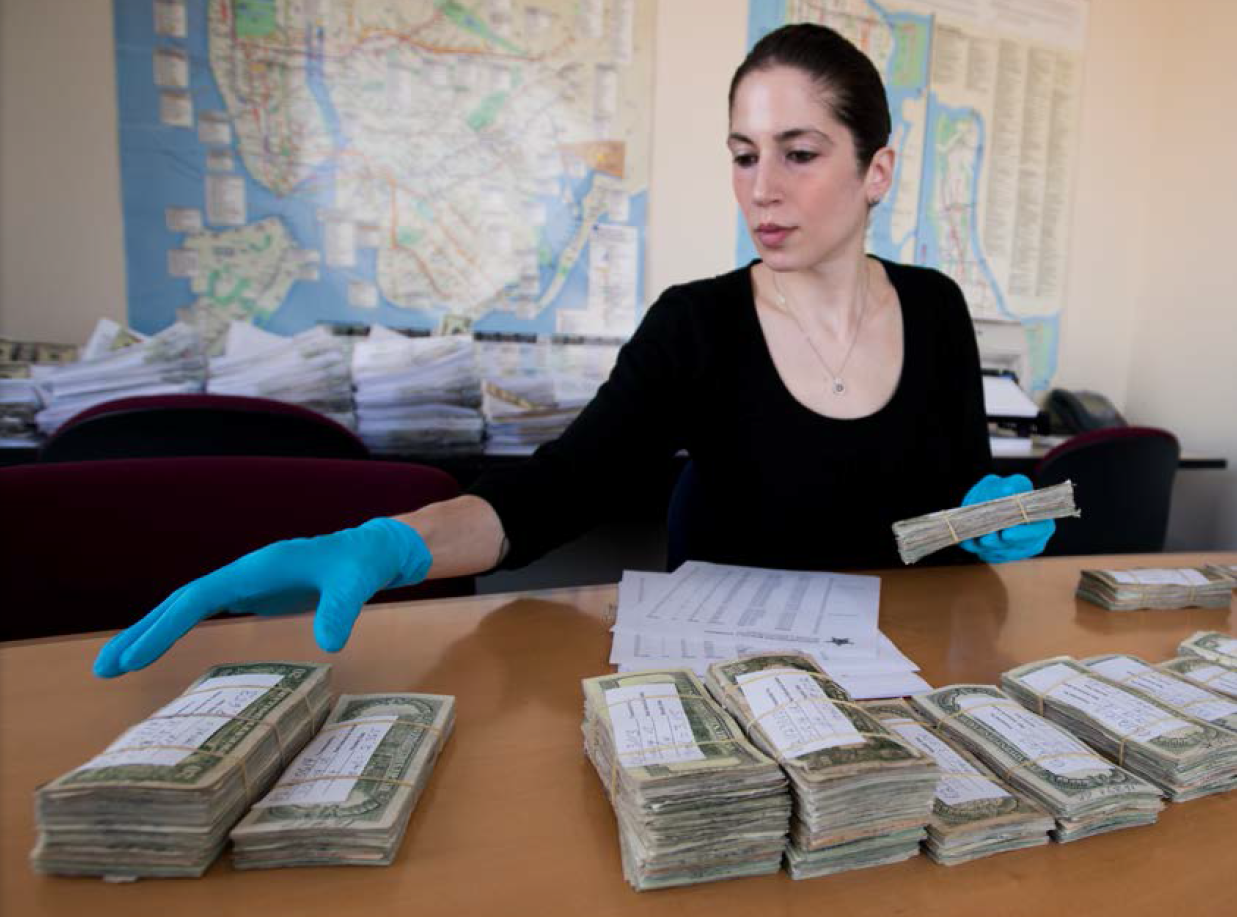
Secret Service Asset Forfeiture and Money Laundering Task Force (AFMLTF)

Effective March 1, 2003, the Secret Service was transferred from the Treasury to the newly established Department of Homeland Security.

The USA Patriot Act, signed into law by President George W. Bush on October 26, 2001, mandated the Secret Service to establish a nationwide network of Secret Service Electronic Crimes Task Force (ECTFs) in addition to the one already active in New York. As such, this mandate expanded on the agency's first ECTF—the New York Electronic Crimes Task Force, formed in 1995—which brought together federal, state and local law enforcement, prosecutors, private-industry companies, and academia. These bodies collectively provide necessary support and resources to field investigations that meet any one of the following criteria: significant economic or community impact; participation of organized criminal groups involving multiple districts or transnational organizations; or use of schemes involving new technology.

The network prioritizes investigations that meet the following criteria:

- Significant economic or community impact,
- Participation of multiple-district or transnational organized criminal groups,
- Use of new technology as a means to commit crime.

Investigations conducted by ECTFs include crimes such as computer generated counterfeit currency; bank fraud; virus and worm proliferation; access device fraud; telecommunications fraud; Internet threats; computer system intrusions and cyberattacks; phishing/spoofing; assistance with Internet-related child pornography and exploitation; and identity theft.

==== International expansion ====
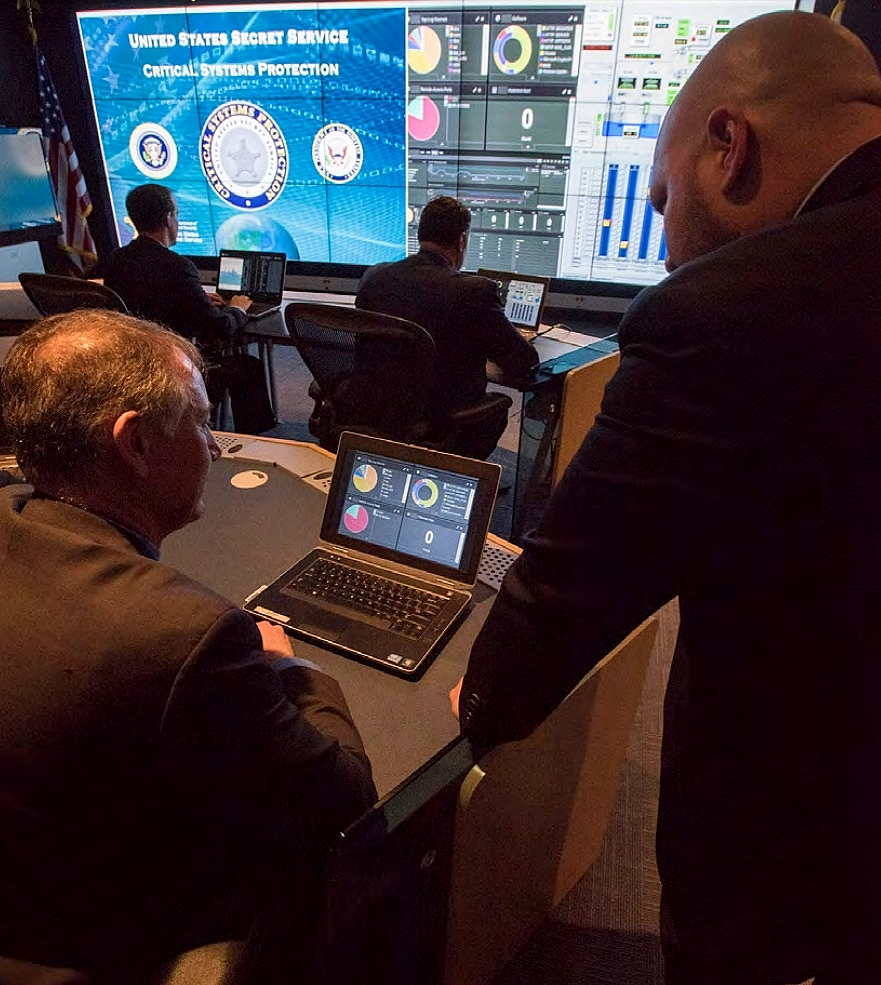
Secret Service Cyber Intelligence Center (CIS)

On July 6, 2009, the U.S. Secret Service expanded its fight on cybercrime by creating the first European Electronic Crime Task Force, based on the successful U.S. domestic model, through a memorandum of understanding with Italian police and postal officials. Over a year later, on August 9, 2010, the agency expanded its European involvement by creating its second overseas ECTF in the United Kingdom.

Both task forces are said to concentrate on a wide range of "computer-based criminal activity," including:

- Identity theft
- Network intrusions
- Other computer-related crimes affecting financial and other critical infrastructures.

==== 2010s ====
In September 2014, the United States Secret Service came under criticism following two high-profile incidents involving intruders at the White House. One such intruder entered the East Room of the White House through an unlocked door. In 2017, it was reported that the United States Secret Service is able to decode printer tracking dots.

==== 2020s ====
On April 15, 2020, the ICE Homeland Security Investigations unit launched "Operation Stolen Promise" that targets COVID-19 related fraud. The operation conscripted resources from various branches of law enforcement and the government, including the U.S. Secret Service. About $2 trillion in the relief package known as the CARES Act were earmarked by law in March 2020, bringing unemployment benefits and loans to millions of Americans. However, as Secret Service spokesmen subsequently pointed out, the Act also opened up opportunities for criminals to fraudulently apply for aid. By the end of 2021, nearly two years into the COVID-19 pandemic, the Secret Service had seized more than $1.2 billion in relief funds appropriated by fraudsters.

On June 1, 2020, during a peaceful protest outside Lafayette Square, the U.S. Secret Service acted contrary to an operational plan and began advancing seven minutes before U.S. Park Police gave any dispersal warnings. This early deployment increased tensions between law enforcement and the protesters. They faced resistance and used pepper spray in response to eggs and bottles being thrown. Attorney General William Barr spoke with the U.S. Park Police operational commander seven minutes before the Secret Service began advancing, and again later, before President Trump visited a nearby Parish House to pose for a photo while holding a Bible. The U.S. Secret Service later apologized but Joseph Cuffari, the Department of Homeland Security Inspector General, prevented career officials from investigating the role U.S. Secret Service played in the Trump administration's controversial use of force to remove protesters that day.

In August 2020, a Secret Service officer shot a man once in the chest at the corner of 17th Street and Pennsylvania during one of then–President Trump's press conferences. The president was evacuated but returned later and told the White House press corps that the man had a gun. However, according to court documents, the man was actually holding a comb, told the officers he was armed and took a shooting stance before being shot. The man is schizophrenic and was charged with simple assault of a law enforcement officer.

A day before the January 6 United States Capitol attack in 2021, the Secret Service warned Capitol Police of threats of violence that Capitol Police officers could face violence at the hands of supporters of President Donald Trump. On January 6, Secret Service agents provided security in and around the United States Capitol, as well as evacuating Vice President Mike Pence during the riot. Testimony in Congress indicates Pence was concerned his security detail would remove him from the Capitol, stopping him from completing his duty to oversee the final count of electoral college votes. At the center of the controversy surrounding the Secret Service and January 6 investigations is Anthony M. Ornato, who had been the head of Trump's security detail, but took the unprecedented step of leaving the Secret Service to become deputy White House chief of staff and becoming a "key part of Trump's effort to get reelected."

The Secret Service assisted in the seizure of hacker forum RaidForums in 2022.

In April 2022, four Secret Service agents, one of whom was assigned to First Lady Jill Biden, were placed on leave after accepting lavish gifts, rent free apartments, and other bribes from two men ultimately convicted of impersonating federal officers.

On August 24, 2022, President Joe Biden named Kimberly Cheatle, the senior director of global security at PepsiCo, as the agency's new director. Cheatle had been in the Secret Service for 27 years and became the first woman to serve as assistant director of protective operations, a department tasked with protecting the president and dignitaries.

On November 12, 2023, a Secret Service agent guarding Naomi Biden fired shots at three people seen breaking into an unoccupied government vehicle in Georgetown.

On July 13, 2024, Secret Service agents protecting former President Donald Trump at a campaign rally in Butler, Pennsylvania in advance of his presumptive Republican candidacy in the 2024 United States presidential election, shot and killed Thomas Matthew Crooks during an assassination attempt on Trump. Crooks, armed with an AR-15–style rifle, had shot at Trump from an elevated position near the venue. Trump was injured in his right ear and quickly rushed to hospital, while Crooks was killed by a Secret Service counter-sniper. One other attendee, 50-year-old Corey Comperatore, was also killed by Crooks and several others in attendance were injured. On July 23, 2024, Kimberly Cheatle resigned from her position as the director of the Secret Service just one day after she testified before the United States House Committee on Oversight and Accountability about the assassination attempt and acknowledged it was "the most significant operational failure at the Secret Service in decades".

== Attacks on presidents ==
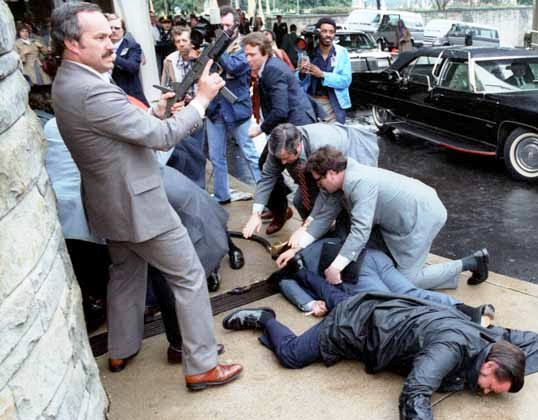
Secret Service agents responding to the assassination attempt of Ronald Reagan by John Hinckley Jr. on March 30, 1981

Since the 1960s, presidents John F. Kennedy (killed), Gerald Ford (twice attacked, but uninjured), Ronald Reagan (seriously wounded), and Donald Trump (injured) have been attacked while appearing in public. Agents on scene, though not injured, during attacks on presidents include William Greer and Roy Kellerman. One of the agents was Robert DeProspero, the Special Agent In Charge (SAIC) of Reagan's Presidential Protective Division (PPD) from January 1982 to April 1985. DeProspero was deputy to Jerry Parr, the SAIC of PPD during the Reagan assassination attempt on March 30, 1981.

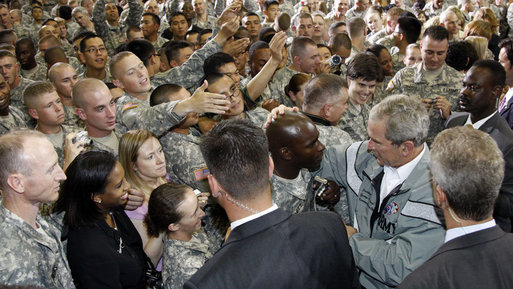
Secret Service agents guard President George W. Bush in 2008.

The Kennedy assassination spotlighted the bravery of two Secret Service agents. First, an agent protecting Mrs. Kennedy, Clint Hill, was riding in the car directly behind the presidential limousine when the attack began. While the shooting continued, Hill leaped from the running board of the car he was riding on and jumped onto the back of the president's moving car and guided Mrs. Kennedy from the trunk back into the rear seat of the car. He then shielded the president and the first lady with his body until the car arrived at the hospital.

Rufus Youngblood was riding in the vice-presidential car. When the shots were fired, he vaulted over the front seat and threw his body over Vice President Lyndon B. Johnson. That evening, Johnson called Secret Service Chief James J. Rowley and cited Youngblood's bravery. Youngblood would later recall some of this in his memoir, Twenty Years in the Secret Service.

The period following the Kennedy assassination was the most difficult in the modern history of the agency. Press reports indicated that morale among the agents was "low" for months following the assassination. The agency overhauled its procedures in the wake of the Kennedy killing. Training, which until that time had been confined largely to "on-the-job" efforts, was systematized and regularized.

The Reagan assassination attempt also involved several Secret Service agents, particularly agent Tim McCarthy, who spread his stance to protect Reagan as six bullets were being fired by the would-be assassin, John Hinckley Jr. McCarthy survived a .22-caliber round in the abdomen. For his bravery, McCarthy received the NCAA Award of Valor in 1982. Jerry Parr, the agent who pushed President Reagan into the limousine, and made the critical decision to divert the presidential motorcade to George Washington University Hospital instead of returning to the White House, was also honored with U.S. Congress commendations for his actions that day.

== Significant investigations ==
One significant Secret Service investigation was the arrest and indictment of Max Ray Butler, co-founder of the Carders Market carding website. Butler was indicted by a federal grand jury in Pittsburgh, Pennsylvania, after his September 5, 2007 arrest, on wire fraud and identity theft charges. According to the indictment, Butler hacked into computers at financial institutions and credit card processing centers over the Internet and sold the tens of thousands of credit card numbers that he acquired in the process.

=== Operation Firewall ===
In October 2004, 28 suspects—located across eight U.S. states and six countries—were arrested on charges of identity theft, computer fraud, credit-card fraud, and conspiracy. Nearly 30 national and foreign field offices of the U.S. Secret Service, including the newly established national ECTFs, and countless local enforcement agencies from around the globe, were involved in this operation. Collectively, the arrested suspects trafficked in at least 1.7 million stolen credit card numbers, which amounted to $4.3 million of losses to financial institutions. However, authorities estimated that prevented loss to the industry was in the hundreds of millions of dollars. The operation, which started in July 2003 and lasted for more than a year, led investigators to identify three cybercriminal groups: Shadowcrew, Carderplanet, and Darkprofits.

From the investigation, there was the arrest and indictment of Albert Gonzalez and 11 other individuals: three U.S. citizens, one from Estonia, three from Ukraine, two from the People's Republic of China, one from Belarus, and one known only by an online alias. They were arrested on August 5, 2008, for the theft and sale of more than 40 million credit and debit card numbers from major U.S. retailers, including TJX Companies, BJ's Wholesale Club, OfficeMax, Boston Market, Barnes & Noble, Sports Authority, Forever 21, and DSW. Gonzalez, the main organizer of the scheme, was charged with computer fraud, wire fraud, access device fraud, aggravated identity theft, and conspiracy for his leading role in the crime.

== Personnel ==
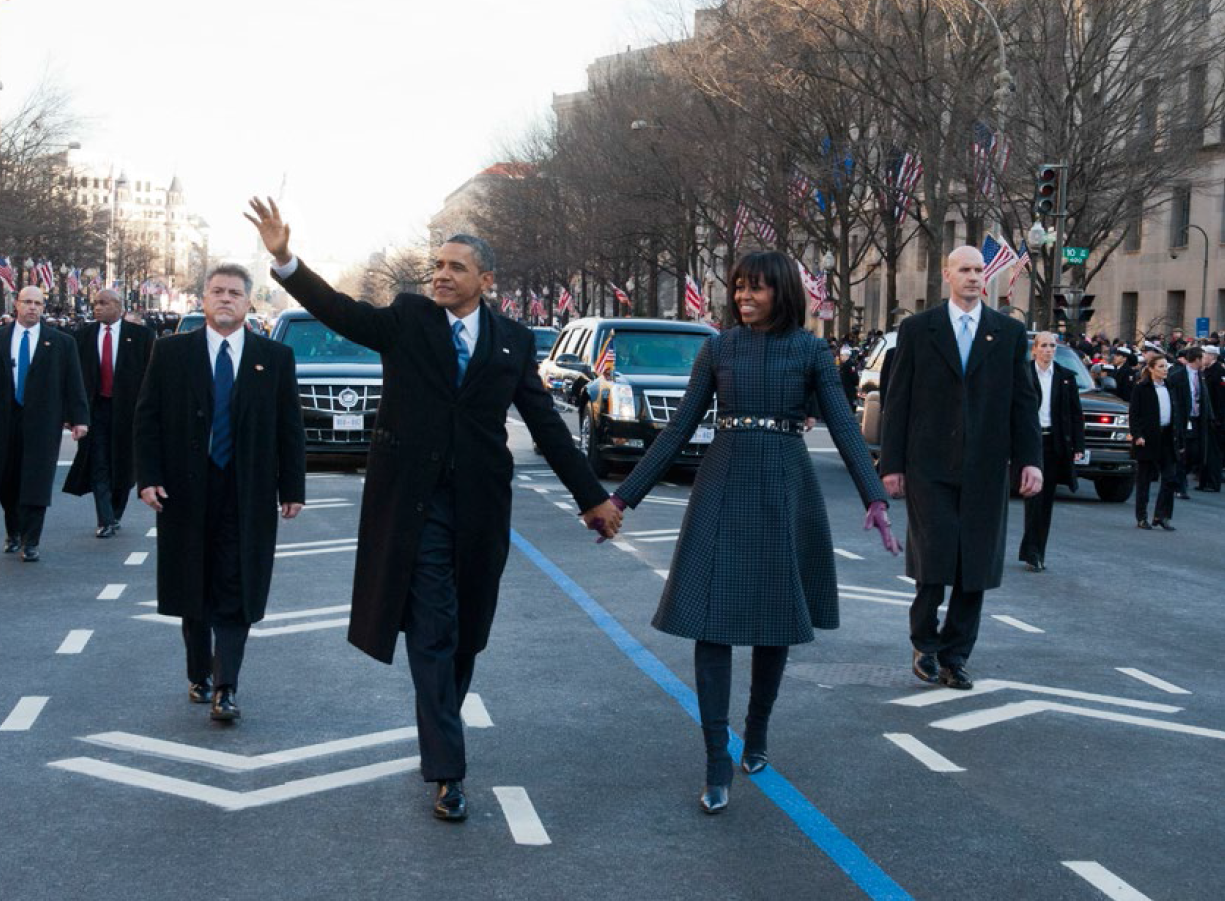
Secret Service agents protecting President Obama and First Lady Michelle Obama

As of 2010, the service had over 6,500 employees: 3,200 Special Agents, 1,300 Uniformed Division Officers, and 2,000 technical and administrative employees. Special agents serve on protective details and investigate financial, cyber, and homeland security-related crimes.

=== Special Agent ===
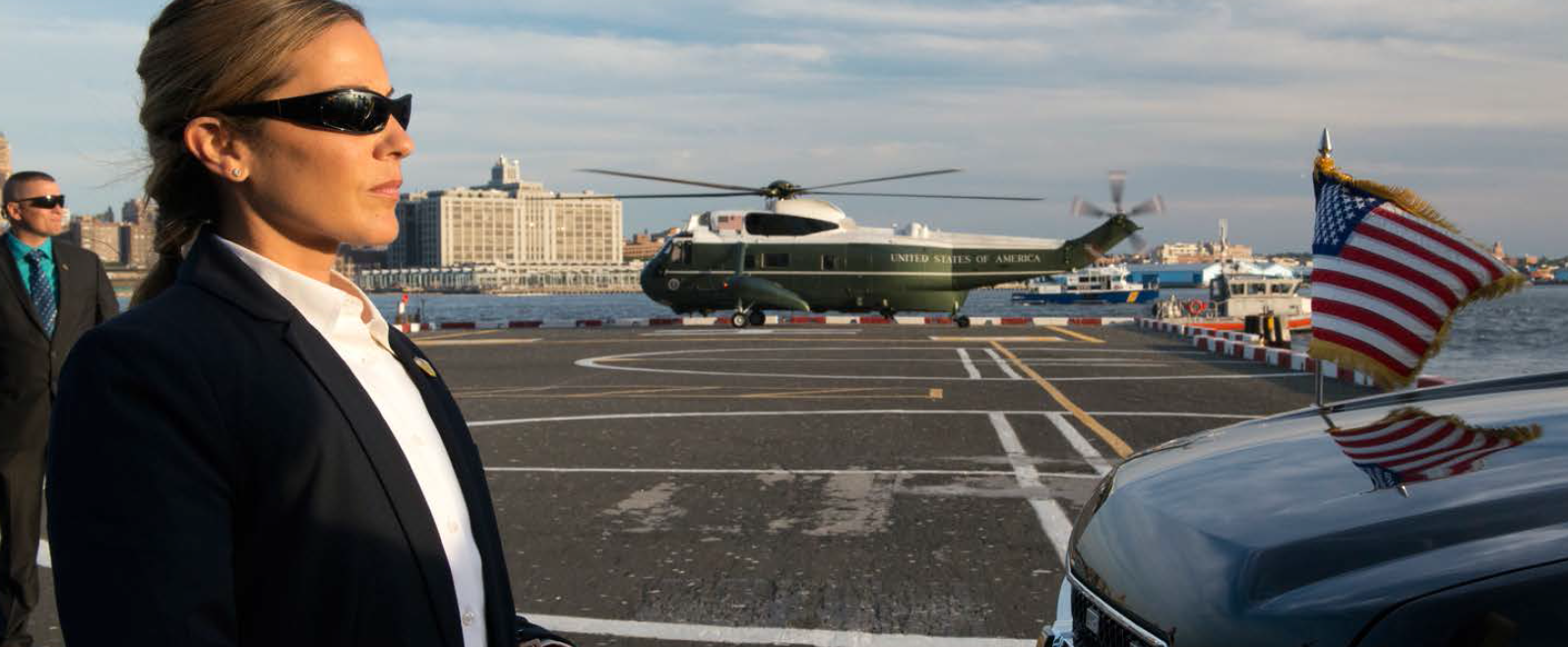
Secret Service agents executing a protective operation

The Secret Service's most familiar personnel are the plain-clothes investigators and personal protectors, who form almost half their total number. This special agent position is highly selective, with for example in 2011, the service accepting less than 1% of its 15,600 special agent applicants.

At a minimum, a prospective agent must be a U.S. citizen, possess a current valid driver's license, be in excellent health and physical condition, possess visual acuity no worse than 20/100 uncorrected or correctable to 20/20 in each eye, and be between age 21–37 at the time of appointment, but eligible veterans may apply past age 37. In 2009, the Office of Personnel Management issued implementation guidance on the Isabella v. Department of State court decision: OPM Letter.

Prospective agents must also qualify for a TS/SCI (Top Secret / Sensitive Compartmented Information) clearance, and undergo an extensive background investigation, to include in-depth interviews, drug screening, medical diagnosis, and full-scope polygraph examination.

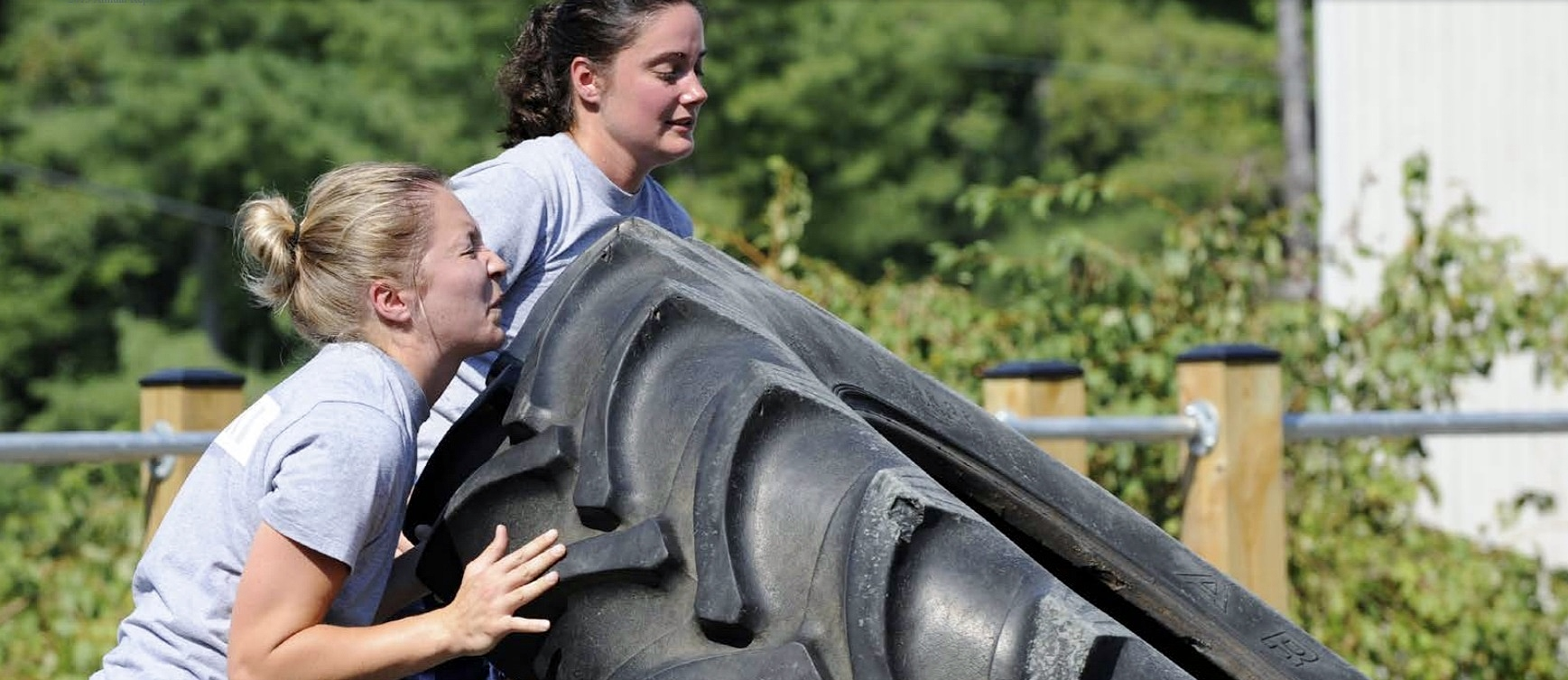
Secret Service agent trainees at the James J. Rowley Training Center (RTC)

Special agents receive training in two locations, totaling approximately 31 weeks. The first phase, the Criminal Investigator Training Program (CITP) is conducted at the U.S. Department of Homeland Security's Federal Law Enforcement Training Centers (FLETC) in Glynco, Georgia, lasting approximately 13 weeks. The second phase, the Special Agent Training Course (SATC) is conducted at the Secret Service Academy, James J. Rowley Training Center (JJRTC), just outside Washington, D.C. in Laurel, Maryland, lasting approximately 18 weeks.

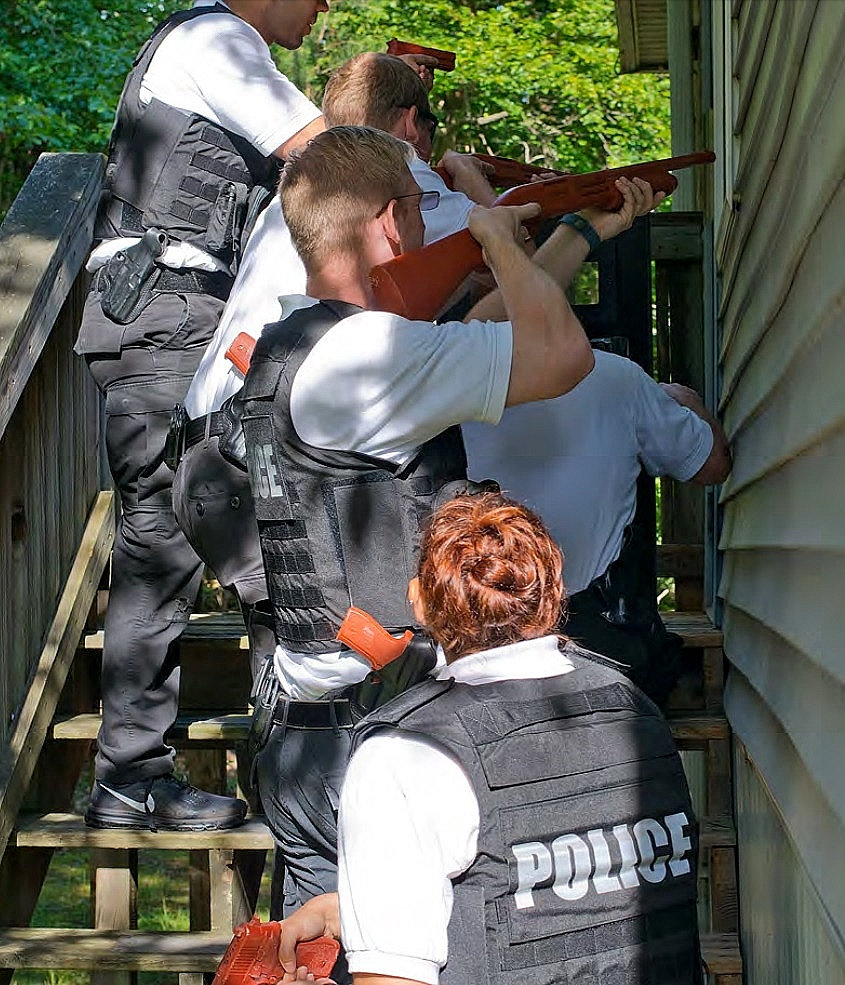
Secret Service agent trainees practice executing a search warrant.

A typical special agent career path, depending upon performance and promotions that affect individual assignments, begins with the first six to eight years on the job assigned to a field office. Applicants are directed to list their office location preference during the application process, and upon receiving a final job offer, usually have several locations to choose from. After their field office experience, agents are usually transferred to a protective assignment where they will stay for three to five years. Following their protective assignment, many agents return to a field office for the rest of their careers, or opt for a headquarters based assignment located in Washington, D.C. During their careers, agents also have the opportunity to work overseas in one of the agency's international field offices. This typically requires foreign language training to ensure language proficiency when working alongside the agency's foreign law enforcement counterparts.

Special agents are hired at the GL-07, GL-09, or GS-11 grade level, depending on individual qualifications and/or education. Agents are eligible for promotion on a yearly basis, from GL-07, to GL-09, to GS-11, to GS-12, to GS-13. The full performance grade level for a journeyman field agent is GS-13, which a GL-07, GL-09, or GS-11 agent may reach in as little as four, three, or two years respectively. GS-13 agents are eligible for competitive promotion to supervisory positions, which encompasses the GS-14, GS-15, and SES grade levels. Higher ranks continue to use variations on the "Special Agent" title, as with several other Federal agencies with a plainclothes or investigatory role. GS-13 agents who wish to remain as rank-and-file field agents, will continue to advance the GS-13 step level, capping at GS-13 Step 10.

Special agents also receive Law Enforcement Availability Pay (LEAP), a type of premium overtime pay which provides them with an additional 25% bonus pay on top of their salary, as agents are required to work an average workweek of 50 hours as opposed to 40. As of 2026, an agent living in the Washington, DC area (DC, VA, MD) will earn an annual salary of $84,060 (GL-07), $93,748 (GL-09), $109,767 (GS-11), $131,563 (GS-12), $156,447 (GS-13), $184,873 (GS-14), and $197,200 (GS-15). Journeyman field agents at GS-13 Step 10 are also paid a salary of $197,200.

Due to the nature of their work, Secret Service agents are regularly eligible for overtime pay in addition to LEAP, and are compensated up to $228,000 per year (Level II of the Executive Schedule).

=== Uniformed Division ===
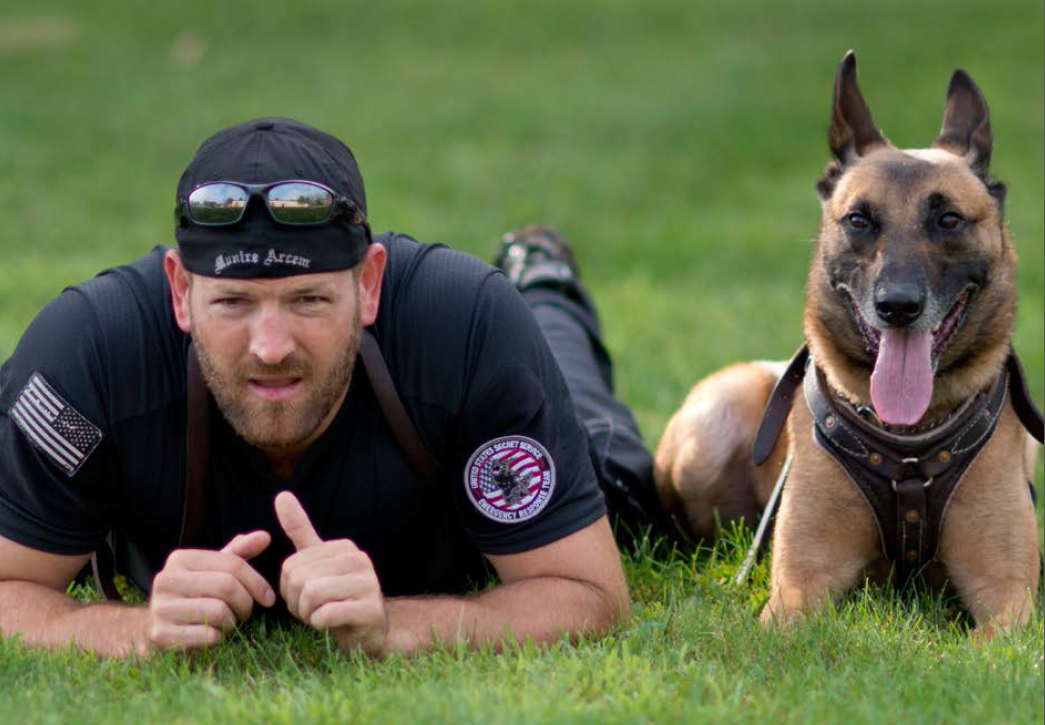
Secret Service officer and his police dog as part of the Emergency Response Team (ERT)

The Uniformed Division, sometimes referred to as the Secret Service Police, is similar to the U.S. Capitol Police or DHS Federal Protective Service, with "police" rather than "agent"-style ranks. It is in charge of protecting the physical White House grounds and foreign diplomatic missions in the Washington, D.C. area. Established in 1922 as the White House Police, this organization was fully integrated into the Secret Service in 1930. In 1970, the protection of foreign diplomatic missions was added to the force's responsibilities, and its name was changed to the Executive Protective Service. The name United States Secret Service Uniformed Division was adopted in 1977.

Secret Service Police officers provide protection for the White House Complex, the vice president's residence, the main Treasury Building and Annex, and foreign diplomatic missions and embassies in the Washington, D.C., area. Additionally, uniformed officers travel in support of presidential, vice presidential and foreign head of state government missions. Officers may, as their careers progress, be selected to participate in one of several specialized units, including the:

- Canine Unit: Performing security sweeps and responding to bomb threats and suspicious packages.
- Emergency Response Team: Providing a coordinated tactical response for the White House and other protected facilities.
- Counter-sniper Team: Utilizing observation, sighting equipment and high-performance weapons to provide a secure environment for protectees.
- Motorcade Support Unit: Providing motorcycle tactical support for official movements of motorcades.
- Crime Scene Search Unit: Photographing, collecting and processing physical and latent evidence.
- Office of Training: Serving as firearms and classroom instructors or recruiters.
- Special Operations Section: Handling special duties and functions at the White House Complex, including conducting the daily congressional and public tours of the White House.

== Weapons and equipment ==
Since the agency's inception, a variety of weapons have been carried by its agents.

As a non-lethal option, special agents, special officers, and Uniformed Division officers are armed with the ASP 16" expandable baton, and Uniformed Division officers also carry pepper spray.

=== Weapons ===
Name	Country of origin	Type	Notes
Glock 19 Gen 5 MOS	Austria	Semi-automatic pistol	Current sidearm for USSS agents; equipped with Ameriglo Bold night sights and the Streamlight TLR-7A weapon light
Glock 47	Austria	Semi-automatic pistol	Current sidearm for Special Operations Division agents; equipped with Ameriglo Bold sights and a Surefire X300 Ultra weapon light
FN Five-seveN	Belgium	Semi-automatic pistol	
Heckler & Koch MP5	Germany	Submachine gun	
FN P90	Belgium	Submachine gun	
Remington 870	United States	Shotgun	
KAC SR-16	United States	Assault rifle	11.5" configurations used by the Counter Assault Team (CAT) and the Emergency Response Team (ERT)
Remington 700	United States	Sniper rifle	Chambered in .300 Winchester Magnum, customized with Accuracy International stocks and Schmidt & Bender optics
KAC SR-25/Mk11 Mod 0	United States	Sniper rifle	Chambered in 7.62mm, equipped with a Trijicon 5.5× ACOG optic

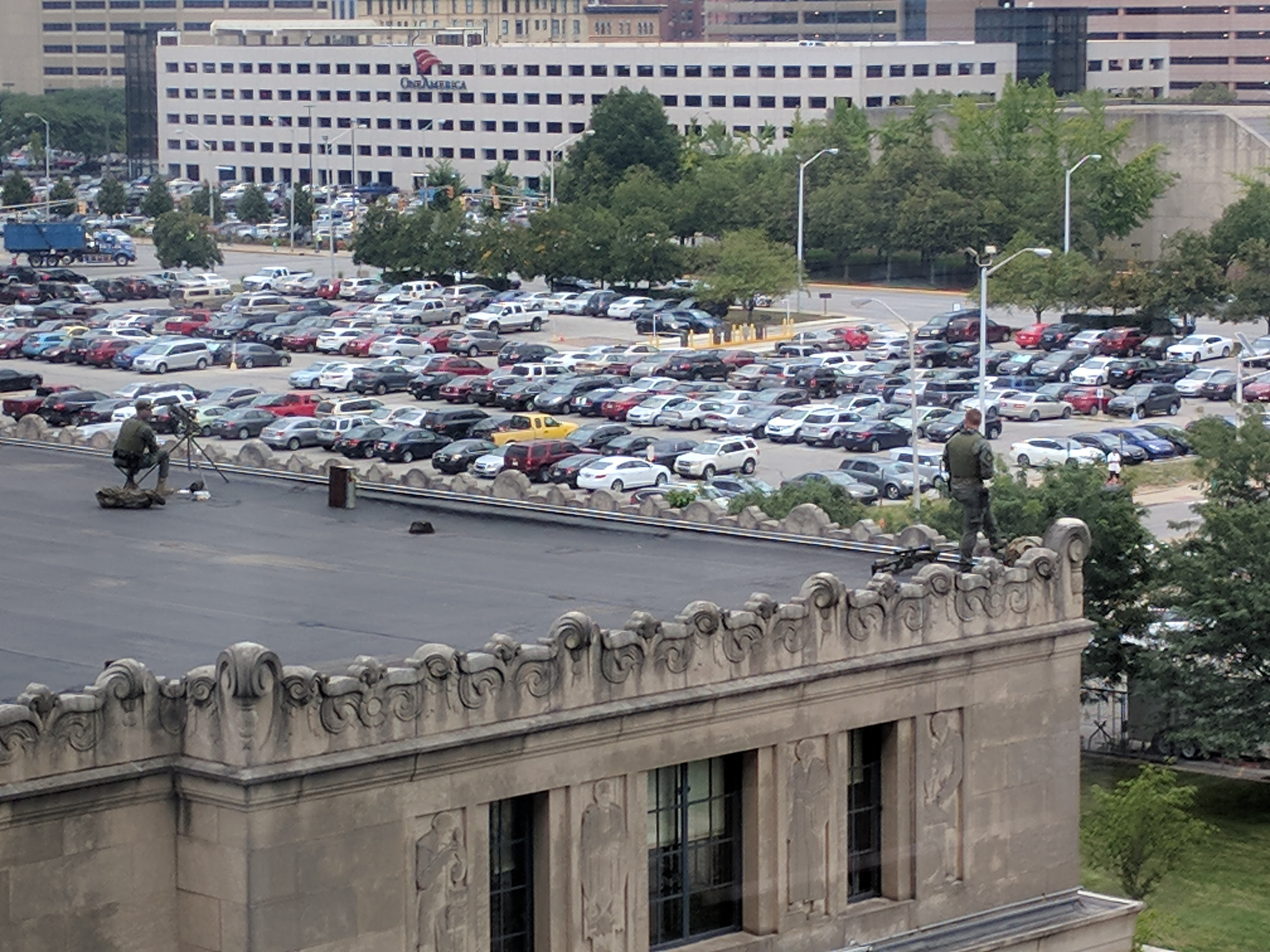
Two snipers protect Vice President Mike Pence in Indianapolis in 2017.

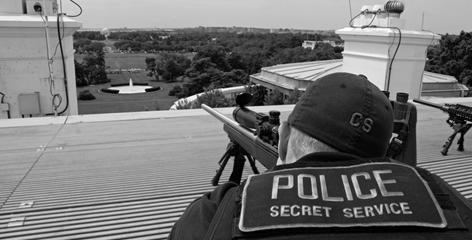
Secret Service counter-sniper marksman on top of the White House's roof, armed with a sniper rifle

=== Badges ===
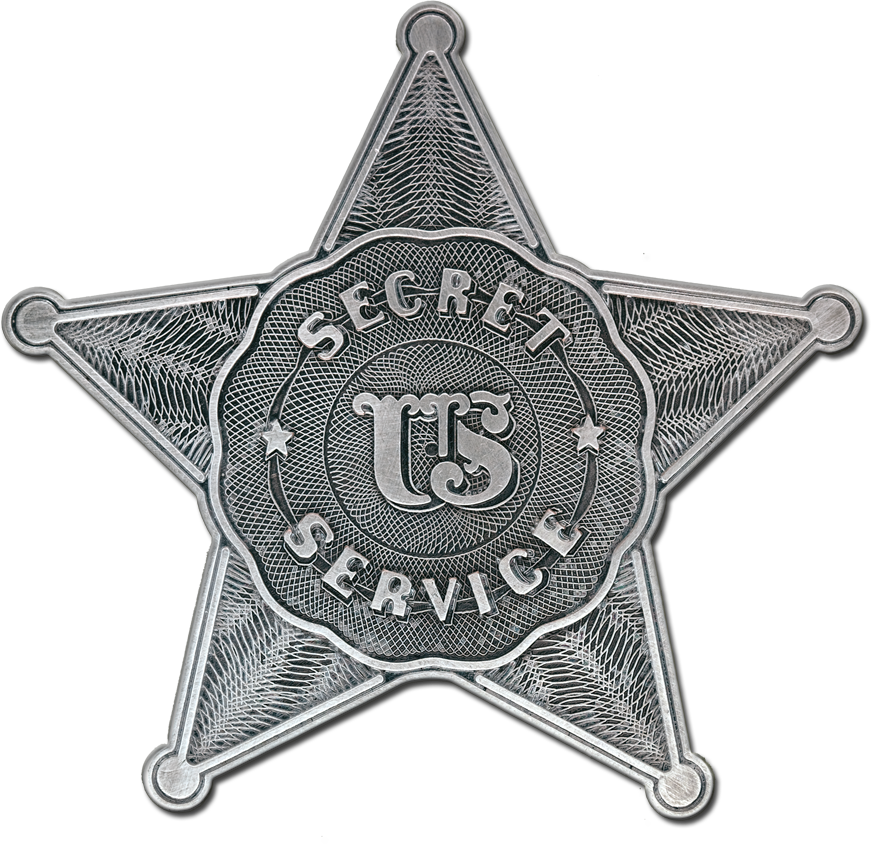
Secret Service badge (1875–1890)

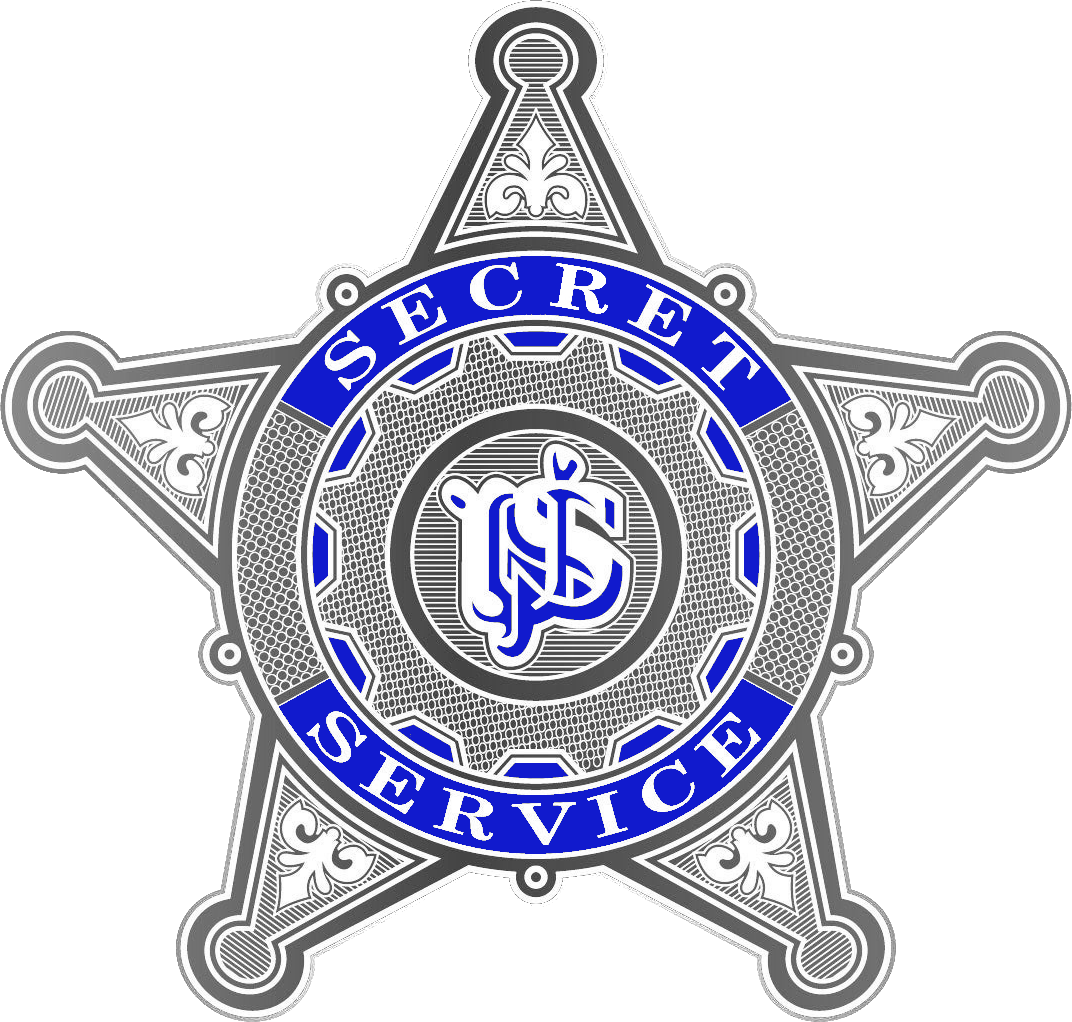
Secret Service badge (1890–1971)

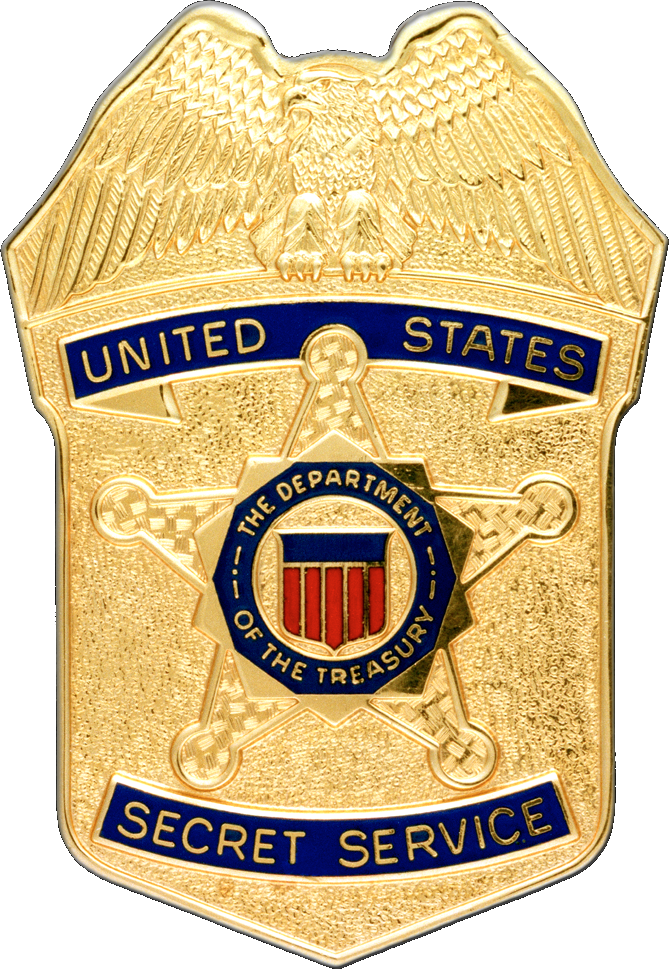
Secret Service badge (1971–2003)

Secret Service badge (2003–2026)

=== Attire ===
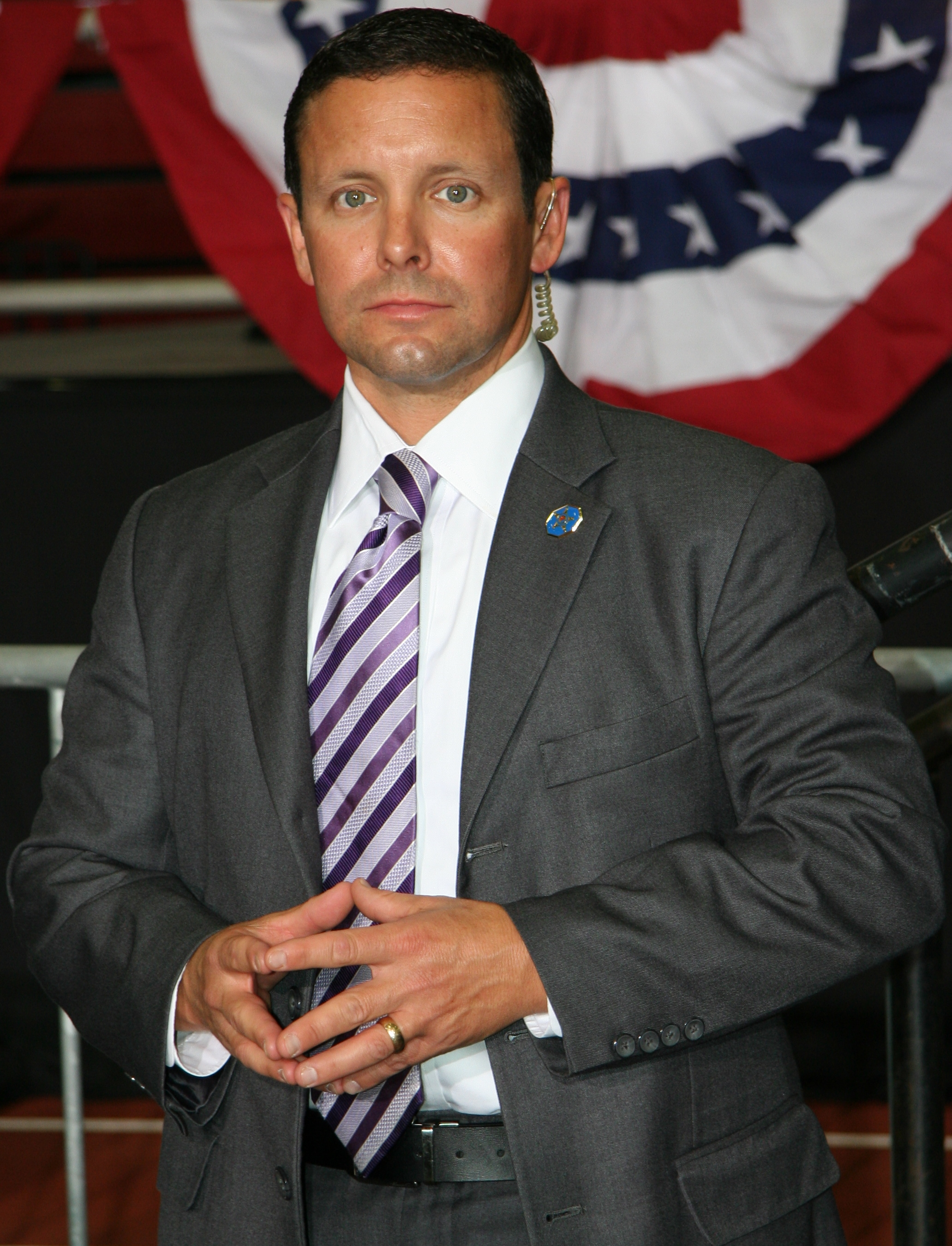
Secret Service agent in business suit working President Obama's protection detail

Special agents and special officers of the Secret Service wear attire that is appropriate for their surroundings, in order to blend in as much as possible. In most circumstances, the attire of a close protection shift is a conservative suit, but it can range from a tuxedo to casual clothing as required by the environment. Stereotypically, Secret Service agents are often portrayed wearing reflective sunglasses and a communication earpiece. Often their attire is customized to conceal the wide array of equipment worn in service. Agents wear a distinctive lapel pin that identifies them to other agents.

The attire for Uniformed Division officers includes standard police uniforms or utility uniforms and ballistic/identification vests for members of the counter-sniper team, Emergency Response Team (ERT), and canine officers. The shoulder patch of the Uniformed Division consists of the U.S. coat of arms on white or black, depending on the garment. Also, the shoulder patch is embroidered with "U.S. Secret Service Uniformed Division Police" around the emblem.

=== Vehicles ===
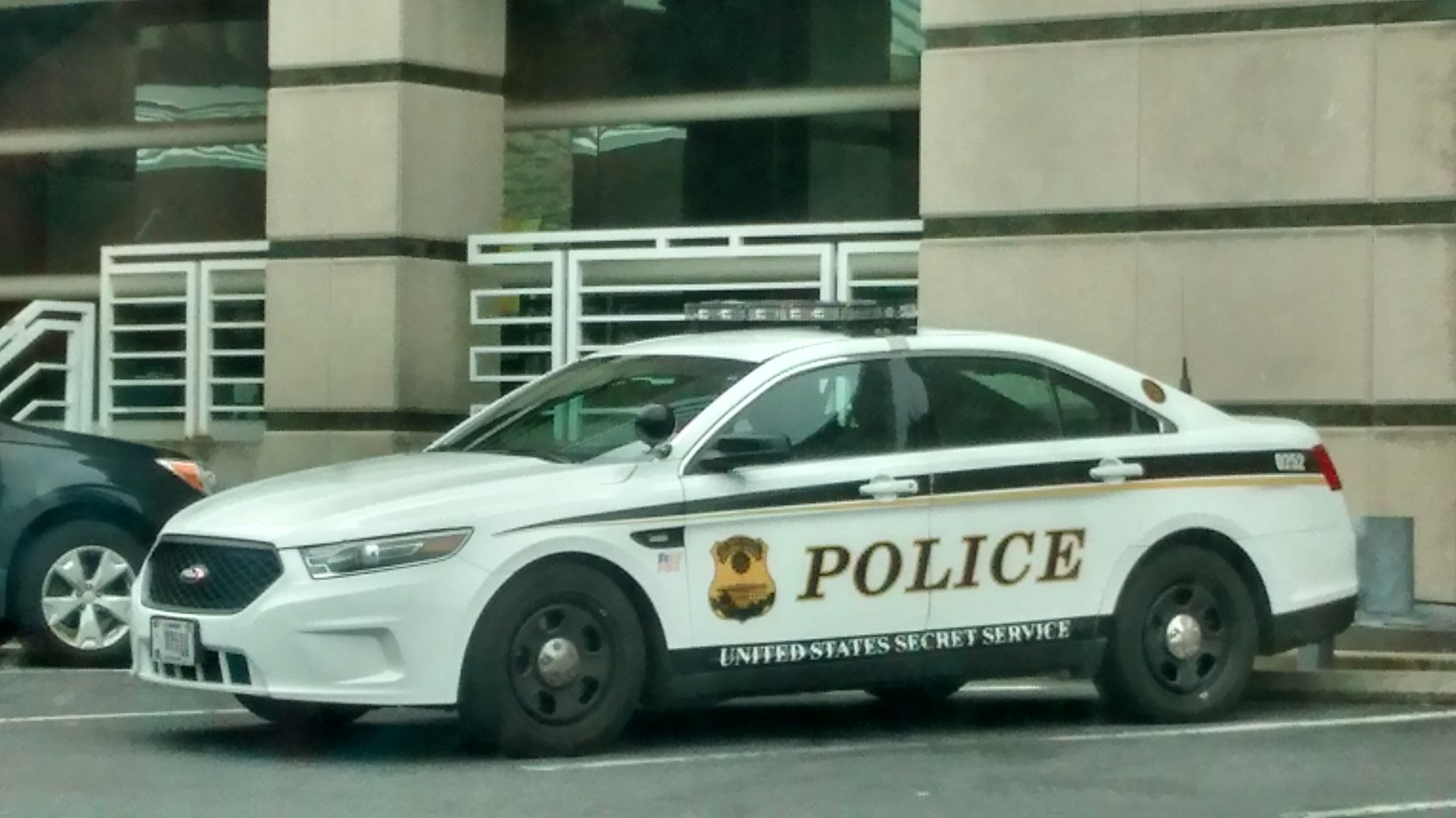
Ford Taurus of the Uniformed Division of the Secret Service

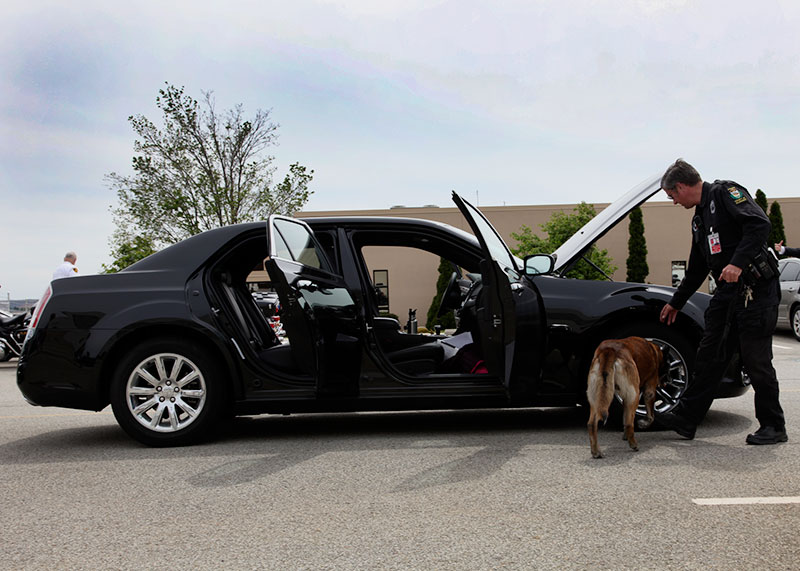
An Allegheny County Police officer and his working dog screening a US Secret Service vehicle for explosives

When transporting the president in a motorcade, the Secret Service uses a fleet of custom-built armored Cadillac Limousines, the newest and largest version of which is known as "The Beast". Armored Chevrolet Suburbans are also used when logistics require such a vehicle or when a more low-profile appearance is required. For official movement, the limousine is affixed with U.S. and presidential flags and the presidential seal on the rear doors. For unofficial events, the vehicles are left sterile and unadorned.

Government audits have criticized the Secret Service for a "slow embrace of technology", according to The New York Times.

== Field offices ==
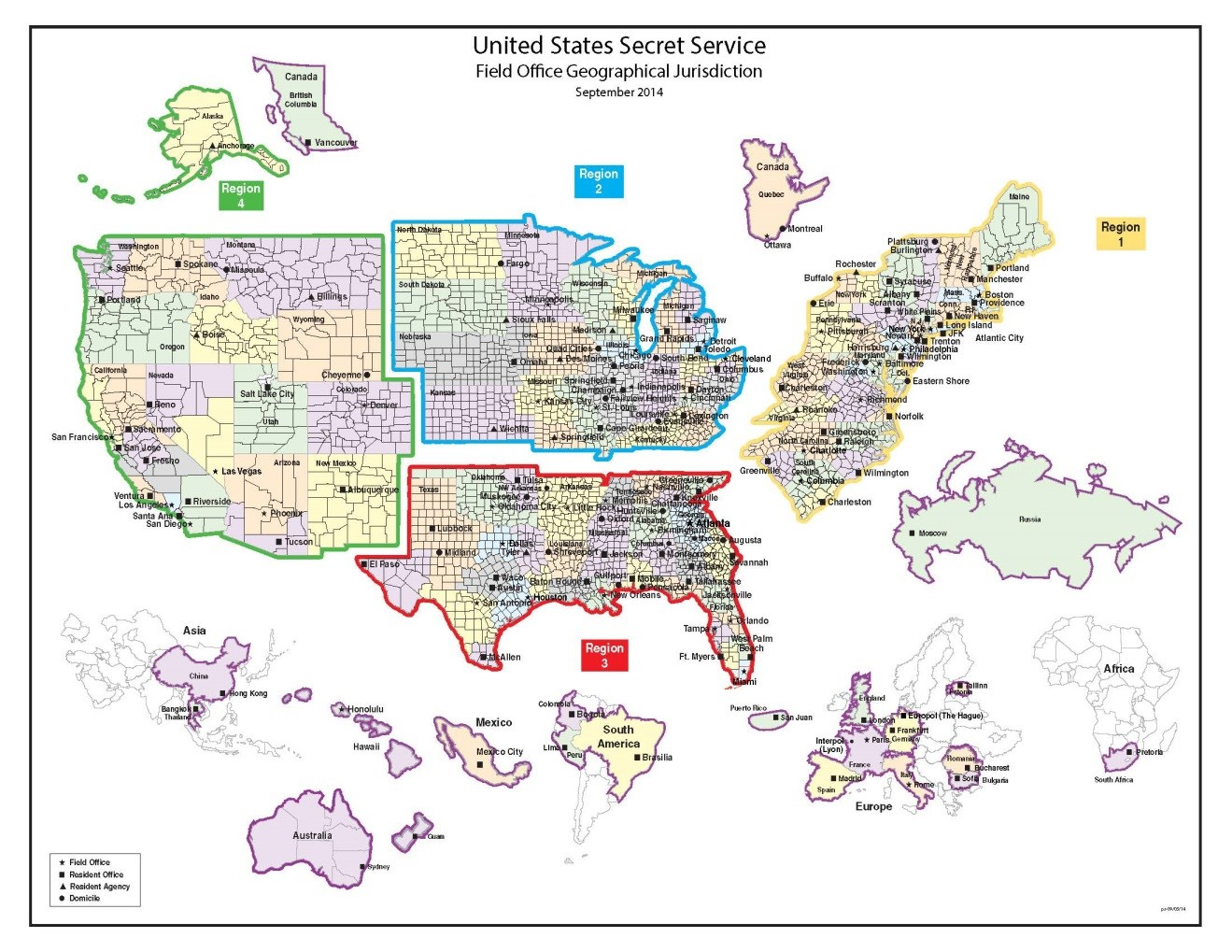
Secret Service field offices, as of September 2014

The Secret Service has agents assigned to 136 field offices and field agencies, and the headquarters in Washington, D.C. The service's offices are located in cities throughout the United States and the world. The offices in Lyon (France) and The Hague (Netherlands) are respectively responsible for liaison with the headquarters of Interpol and Europol, located in those cities.

== Misconduct ==
On April 14, 2012, the U.S. Secret Service placed 11 agents on administrative leave as the agency investigated allegations that the men brought prostitutes to their hotel rooms in Cartagena, Colombia, while on assignment to protect President Obama and that a dispute ensued with one of the women over payment the following morning.

After the incident was publicized, the Secret Service implemented new rules for its personnel. The rules prohibit personnel from visiting "non-reputable establishments" and from consuming alcohol less than ten hours before starting work. Additionally, they restrict who is allowed in hotel rooms.

In 2015, two inebriated senior Secret Service agents drove an official car into the White House complex and collided with a barrier. Chairperson of the United States House Committee on Oversight and Government Reform, Jason Chaffetz, investigated the incident. In September 2015, it was revealed that 18 Secret Service employees or supervisors, including Assistant Director Ed Lowery, accessed an unsuccessful 2003 application by Chaffetz for employment with the agency and discussed leaking the information to the media in retaliation for Chaffetz' investigations of agency misconduct. The confidential personal information was later leaked to The Daily Beast. Agency Director Joe Clancy apologized to Chaffetz and said that disciplinary action would be taken against those responsible.

In March 2017, a member of Vice President Mike Pence's detail was suspended after the agent was caught visiting a prostitute at a hotel in Maryland.

In July 2022, during President Biden's trip to the Middle East, a Secret Service agent was sent back to the United States from Israel after indiscriminately assaulting a woman who was walking in the street, next to a bar in Machane Yehuda. A Secret Service spokesman said in a statement that the agency was informed of the encounter, and the agent, who was working in Israel, was "briefly detained and questioned by Israeli police, who released him without charges."

On July 15, 2022, The Intercept reported that a letter from the Department of Homeland Security revealed the Secret Service had erased text messages from the day before and day of the January 6 insurrection, shortly after those messages were requested by oversight officials investigating the agency's response to the US Capitol riots. The agency claimed that the messages "were erased as part of a device-replacement program," although the agency is bound by regulation to preserve all records of its activity (including text messages, emails, and other electronic communications). According to Politico on July 19, 2022, as new material becomes available to the United States House Select Committee on the January 6 Attack, "a potential second round of hearings gets slated for the fall [of 2022]". Such related new materials may include further details regarding "the potential unauthorized deletion" of text messages, particularly those from around January 5 and 6, 2021, by the Secret Service, then headed by Director James M. Murray, an appointee by then-President Trump in 2019. The Department of Homeland Security's inspector general has initiated a criminal investigation into the erasure of text messages exchanged by Secret Service agents relating to the January 6 Capitol breach.

== See also ==
- Bodyguard
- Central Guard Bureau
- Commander-in-Chief's Guard – the American Revolutionary War unit that also had the dual responsibilities of protecting the Commander-in-Chief and the Continental Army's money
- Confederate Secret Service
- List of protective service agencies
- Praetorian Guard
- Secret Service codename
- Steve Jackson Games, Inc. v. United States Secret Service
- Title 31 of the Code of Federal Regulations

== Bibliography ==
- Hammond, John Hays (1974) [1935]. The Autobiography of John Hays Hammond. New York: Farrar & Rinehart. ISBN 978-0-405-05913-1.
- Harris, Charles H. III; Sadler, Louis R. (2009). The Secret War in El Paso: Mexican Revolutionary Intrigue, 1906–1920. Albuquerque, NM: University of New Mexico Press. ISBN 978-0-8263-4652-0.
