= White House shooting =

White House shooting may refer to:

- 1994 White House shooting, a shooting in October 1994
- 2011 White House shooting, a shooting in November 2011
- 2016 White House incident, an attempted shooting in May 2016
- 2026 White House Correspondents' Dinner shooting, an incident that occurred April 25, 2026 at the Washington Hilton in Washington, D.C.
- May 2026 White House shooting, a shooting in May 2026
