= 2014 White House intrusion =

Intrusion into the White House

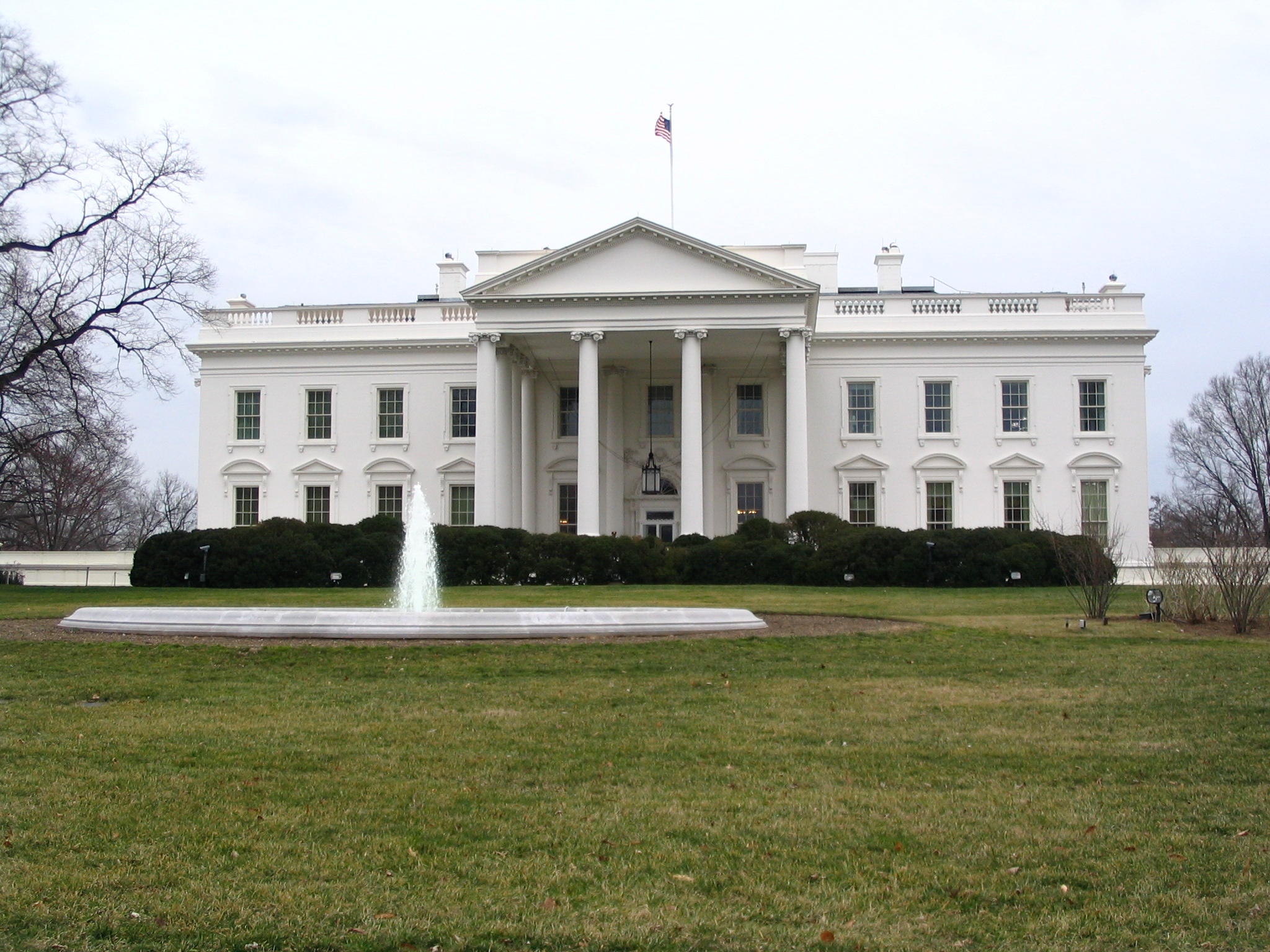
- The north side of the White House, where Gonzalez entered through the unlocked door
- Location: 38.8978°N 77.0365°W; White House, Washington, D.C., United States
- Date: September 19, 2014; 7:20 p.m. (UTC-5)
- Attack type: Intrusion and assault
- Weapon: Pocket knife
- Perpetrator: Omar J. Gonzalez

An intrusion of the White House occurred on September 19, 2014, when Omar J. Gonzalez, an Iraq War veteran with post-traumatic stress disorder, jumped over the White House's fence and entered the building's front door, overpowered a security officer, was stopped by another who was off-duty, then later by multiple security officers, and arrested. He was found to have a small knife in his pocket, and stated that the "atmosphere was collapsing" and he needed to tell the president so that he could alert the public. President Barack Obama and his family were not home at the time of the incident. As a result of this incident and other security breaches at the White House, the then-director of the United States Secret Service, Julia Pierson, resigned from her position on October 1, 2014.

Gonzalez was indicted for entering a restricted building while armed with a knife. He was also charged with two violations of local laws: carrying a weapon outside a home or business, and ammunition possession. In March 2015, Gonzalez pleaded guilty to two felonies: "entering or remaining in a restricted building or grounds while carrying a deadly weapon", and "assaulting a federal officer". In June 2015 he was sentenced to 17 months in prison, to be followed by three years' probation.

== Background ==
Omar J. Gonzalez was born in Puerto Rico. His father was a Korean War veteran. He enlisted in the US Army in July 1997 when he was 25, and discharged in 2003 after completing his six-year service period. Gonzalez re-enlisted in July 2005, and was deployed to the Iraq War from October 2006 until January 2008. Gonzalez received several medals for marksmanship and conduct during his service. He married Samantha Bell in 2006; however, they separated in 2010 and were divorced in July 2014. According to Bell, after returning from Iraq, Gonzalez carried a handgun on his hip at all times, and also kept several rifles and shotguns behind the doors in their house.

Gonzalez retired from the army due to a disability in December 2012. He wore a back brace and complained of pain in his foot, though friends stated he never disclosed the nature of his injury. A family member said he had been injured by an improvised explosive device (IED) in Iraq and had been prescribed both antidepressant and anti-anxiety medication, though he was suspected to have since ceased taking the medication. Gonzalez's former step-son said that Gonzalez was "a very good guy" who was suffering from post-traumatic stress disorder (PTSD). According to a neighbor, he used a cane and was taking "very strong medication".

Since February 2013, he had been receiving monthly disability payments of $1,652, though he had not sought treatment at any VA Medical Center facility. Gonzalez lived in Copperas Cove, near Fort Hood, Texas, until a few weeks before the incident. Neighbours described him as "friendly and big-hearted", but stated that in the months before he left the town, his behaviour had become paranoid, and unpredictable. Believing that someone would break into his home, Gonzalez started carrying a gun when walking his dogs, and installed extra security at his house, also choosing to leave his Christmas lights up as they illuminated his property. He told a neighbour that children made him nervous, because he had seen children with bombs strapped to them during the war. When a friend asked him why he had not been answering his cell phone, Gonzalez explained that he had placed it in the microwave; he thought the government was trying to bug his house. He lived without electricity in the weeks before he left the town to move to a campground. In February 2013, Gonzalez called the police to report a burglary. When police arrived at his house they found him patrolling his front yard with an assault rifle, handgun and a knife. Gonzalez told police there were cameras and listening devices in his house that were secretly recording him.

On July 19, 2014, police in Southwest Virginia received calls regarding a reckless driver, and then observed a Ford Bronco travelling at high speed. Gonzalez initially tried to flee after troopers tried to make him pull over; he drove his vehicle off the road into a highway median. After searching his vehicle, police found a sawed-off shotgun, two rifles and four handguns, as well as ammunition and a tomahawk. They also found a map of Washington, D.C., with a circle drawn around the White House. Gonzalez was arrested for eluding police and possessing a sawed-off shotgun. He said he failed to stop because he had an "Iraqi moment": a "flashback" that was triggered by the lights and sirens of the police car. Virginian police informed both the Bureau of Alcohol, Tobacco, Firearms and Explosives and the Secret Service about the arrest. Secret Service agents subsequently interviewed Gonzalez though he was deemed not to be a threat. On August 25, Secret Service agents approached Gonzalez at the White House fence after noticing a small hatchet in his waistband. Agents searched his car and found two dogs, two more hatchets, camping equipment, and empty gun cases, though no guns or ammunition. Secret Service agents interviewed Gonzalez again; they were aware that he had been interviewed by other agents the previous month. He was still deemed to not be a threat.

== Incident ==
At approximately 7:20 pm on Friday, September 19, 2014, Gonzalez scaled the iron perimeter fence of the White House. Several agents pursued him, as he ran directly towards the North Portico doors, which were unlocked. President Barack Obama and his daughters had just left the White House and were heading to Camp David at the time of the incident. Michelle Obama was also not home, having travelled to the retreat earlier. Agents stated they chose not to shoot at Gonzalez as he did not have a weapon in his hands, and was not wearing clothing that could conceal a significant amount of explosives; the possibility of accidentally hitting civilians beyond the fence was also cited. A senior official stated: "A lot of people want to judge the Secret Service for not shooting, but [a] number of things have to be considered in this situation, including whether or not the principal is in the residence" adding, "given what's emerged about [Gonzalez's mental health] since the arrest, maybe we'll look back and say the Secret Service played a role in saving his life."

The Secret Service initially reported that Gonzalez had been stopped at the entrance; however, it was later revealed that he made it farther inside. It was also revealed that an alarm box near the entrance, which was designed to alert guards inside of a trespasser, had been disabled at the request of the usher's office on the grounds that it was "disruptive"; an agent told The Washington Post that the boxes frequently malfunctioned, sounding the alarm when there was no intruder.

Gonzalez then overpowered a female Secret Service agent and ran into the East Room, where he was tackled by an off-duty agent who was in the process of leaving for the night. He was arrested and taken to George Washington University Hospital after complaining of chest pains. A Spyderco folding knife with a 3½-inch serrated blade was found in his pocket; Gonzalez's former step-son stated that Gonzalez always carried the knife with him. According to an agent, while he was being arrested Gonzalez stated that the "atmosphere was collapsing", and that he needed to tell the president so that he could alert the public. Media and staff were allowed to return some time later though a partial lockdown of the northwest side of the building continued for several hours.

After he was arrested, Gonzalez gave permission for his vehicle, parked nearby, to be searched. Agents recovered 800 rounds of ammunition, two hatchets, and a machete from the car. Gonzalez was ordered to be held without bond until a detention hearing on October 1. Less than 24 hours later another man was arrested after driving to a White House gate and refusing to leave. There was no evidence to suggest the two incidents were related.

== Response ==
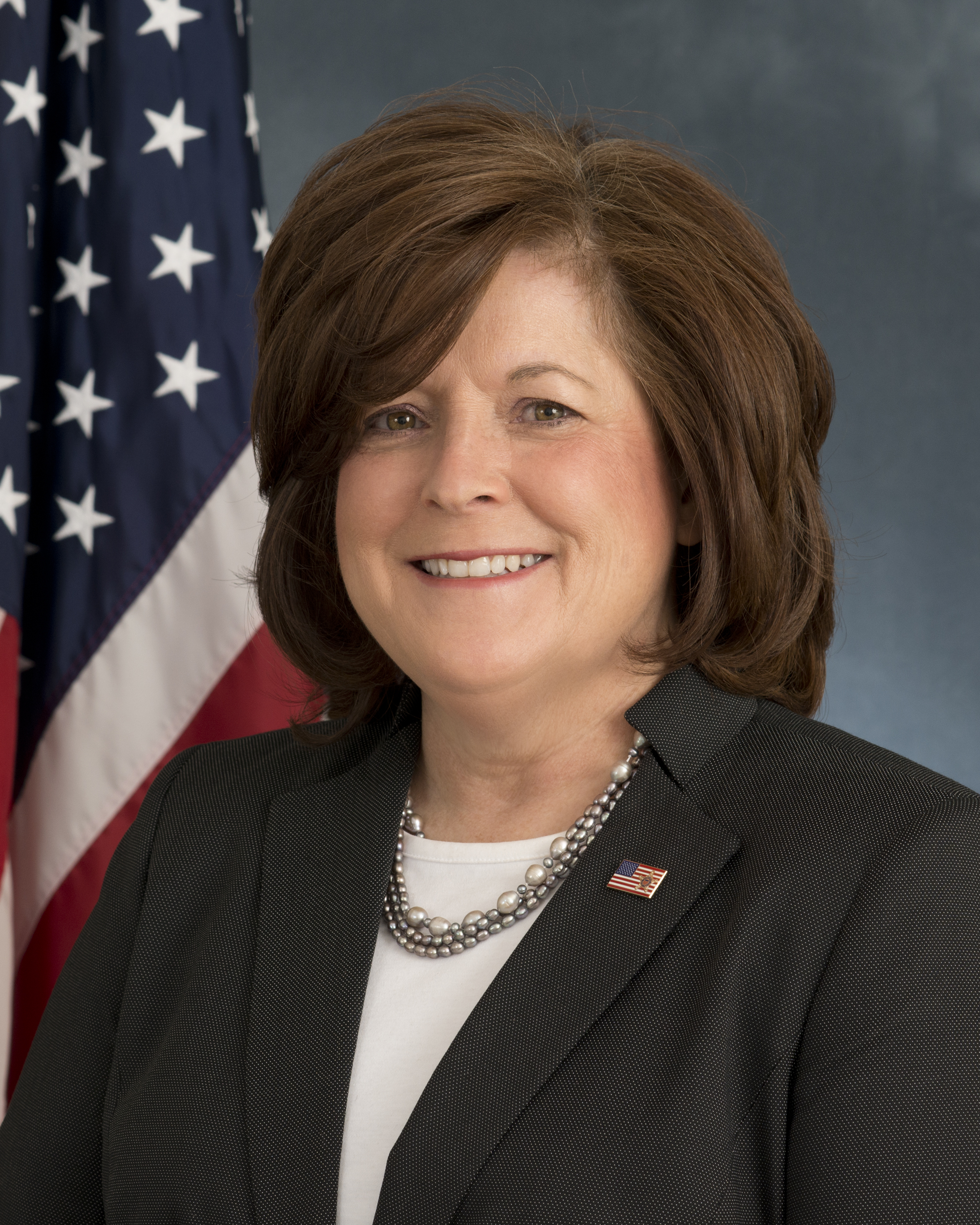
Julia Pierson, Director of the United States Secret Service, resigned from her position shortly after the incident

On September 22 Jeh Johnson, then United States Secretary of Homeland Security, released a statement urging the public "not to rush to judgement" over the incident, and not to "second-guess the judgement of security officers who only had seconds to act". White House Press Secretary Josh Earnest said that President Obama was "obviously concerned" about the incident but "continues to have complete confidence" in the Secret Service. Earnest said that the Secret Service had increased foot patrols, added additional surveillance, was providing additional training to officers to handle similar situations, and had "changed the procedures for ensuring that the entrance to the White House was secure."

On September 24 the Secret Service said they were investigating how Gonzalez was able to penetrate the White House grounds to such an extent. Director Julia Pierson said that in addition to an investigation, there would be an increase in security patrols and surveillance. District of Columbia representative Eleanor Holmes Norton sent a letter to Pierson requesting a meeting to discuss the Gonzalez incident as well as other security breaches at the White House, saying: "Before any action is taken, the first step must be to conduct a full and thorough investigation into the White House breach. The next step is to recognize that the area in front of the White House, including Lafayette Park, is a First Amendment area, which must not be taken away from District of Columbia residents and the millions of other Americans who visit each year." New York representative Peter T. King said the incident was "absolutely inexcusable", adding: "This demands a full investigation, an investigation as to what happened, why it happened and what's being done to make sure it never happens again".

Ron Fournier from the National Journal said the incident was a reflection of how Veterans Affairs was failing soldiers suffering from PTSD. Fournier also commented on how media coverage of the incident was largely ignoring the fact that Gonzalez was a war veteran with mental health issues. As a result of the Gonzalez incident, and other controversies relating to the security of the White House, including the 2011 White House shooting, Pierson resigned from her position on October 1, 2014.

== Charges and trial ==
Gonzalez was charged with one federal count of entering a restricted building or grounds while carrying a deadly or dangerous weapon. In addition he was charged with violating two local laws: "carrying a dangerous weapon outside a home or business", and "unlawful possession of ammunition". The three charges carry maximum prison terms of ten, five and one year in prison, respectively. On October 1, 2014, Gonzalez pleaded not guilty to all charges. He did not speak during his court appearance, which only lasted 20 minutes. Judge Deborah A. Robinson ordered that Gonzalez remain in jail without bond, also ordering that Gonzalez undergo a mental competency screening on October 17.

In March 2015, Gonzalez pleaded guilty to two felonies: "entering or remaining in a restricted building or grounds while carrying a deadly weapon", and "assaulting a federal officer". In May 2015, Gonzalez pleaded guilty to the counts of evading police and possessing a sawed-off shotgun in Virginia. He was sentenced to a 15-year suspended sentence and 10 years of supervision. On June 16, 2015, District Judge Rosemary M. Collyer sentenced him to a 17-month prison sentence to be followed by three years of probation. Collyer also ordered Gonzalez to stay out of Washington, D.C., give the Secret Service access to his medical records, and give up his firearms and weapons. She addressed Gonzalez directly, saying "No more guns, no more machetes, no more knives, no more tomahawks. Got it?" Gonzalez said "I would like to apologize. I am sorry for my actions. I never meant to harm anyone. I want to commit to maintain my treatment that started at the prison." Prosecutor Vincent Cohen, who had recommended 18 months in prison, stated "Mr. Gonzalez is now paying the price for his foolish decision to jump the fence and run inside the White House. The prison sentence imposed by the court should deter others from taking actions that needlessly put the First Family and White House employees at risk."

== See also ==
- List of White House security breaches
- Assassination threats against Barack Obama
- List of United States presidential assassination attempts and plots
