= A. T. Smith =

Former U.S. Secret Service deputy director

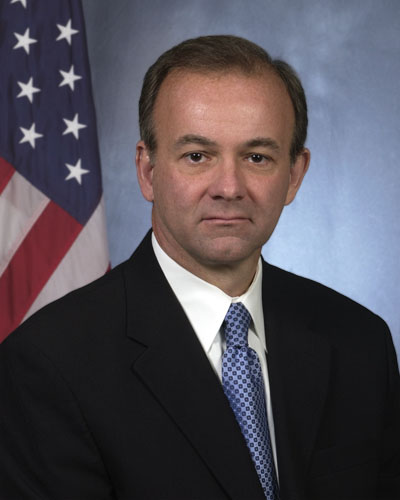

Deputy Director of the U.S. Secret Service, (Ret.)
- In office April 7, 2012 – February 10, 2015
- Preceded by: Keith L. Prewitt
- Succeeded by: Craig Magaw

Personal details
- Born: Greenville, South Carolina, U.S.
- Spouse: Catherine Smith
- Children: Thomas Winfield Smith
- Education: University of South Carolina, B.S. University of Alabama, M.S. Johns Hopkins University, MScM
- Profession: Law enforcement

A. T. Smith is a former Deputy Director of the United States Secret Service. He was appointed by former Director Mark Sullivan in April 2012. Smith also served under former directors Julia Pierson and Joseph Clancy.

== Early life and education ==
Smith grew up in Greenville, South Carolina. He received his undergraduate degree as Bachelor of Science in Criminal Justice from the University of South Carolina. He received a Master of Science in Criminal Justice from the University of Alabama in 1993 and a Master of Science in Management from the Johns Hopkins University School of Business in 2004.

== Career ==
Smith began his law enforcement career at the Greenville County Sheriff's Office as a dispatcher in 1978. During his eight years in the Sheriff's Office he also served as Uniformed Deputy, Sergeant and Lieutenant. His work with the United States Secret Service started in 1986, rising through the ranks until becoming Assistant Director of the Office of Investigations, where he oversaw criminal investigations and developed investigative policies. At this time, he had served the Secret Service for 25 years.

After former deputy Keith L. Prewitt retired, Smith was appointed Deputy Director by then-Director Mark J. Sullivan. Sullivan cited his "well-deserved reputation as a focused and consummate professional" and his leadership abilities both within the Secret Service and with its partners.

Smith was succeeded by Craig Magaw in March 2015.

== Awards ==
In 2004, Smith was presented with the Department of Homeland Security Secretary’s Award of Excellence by Tom Ridge "for his work during the 2004 Republican National Convention." In 2006, he was presented with the Department of Homeland Security Secretary’s Silver Medal by Michael Chertoff "for his work in the greater New York area." He received the Presidential Rank Award for Meritorious Service in September 2010.
