= 2011 White House shooting =

Assassination attempt on President Barack Obama, 2011

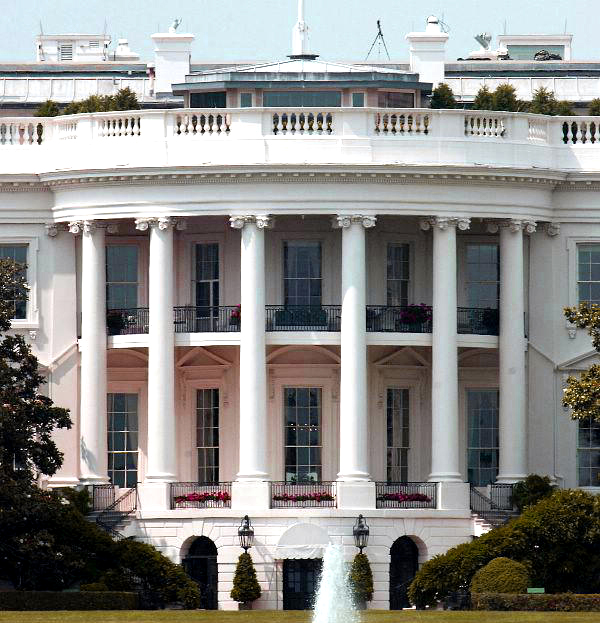
- Evidence of the shooting was first found on the Truman Balcony (second floor).

- 2011 White House shooting (Central Washington, D.C.) Central Washington, D.C.
- Location: 38°53′32″N 77°02′12″W; White House, Washington, D.C., United States
- Date: November 11, 2011 c. 9:00 p.m. (UTC-5)
- Target: President Barack Obama
- Attack type: Shooting
- Weapon: Romanian AK47 Semi-automatic rifle
- Deaths: 0
- Injuries: 0
- Perpetrator: Oscar Ramiro Ortega-Hernandez

On November 11, 2011, Oscar Ramiro Ortega-Hernandez, an unemployed 21-year-old man, fired multiple shots at the White House using a semi-automatic rifle. At least seven bullets hit the second floor. Neither President Barack Obama nor First Lady Michelle Obama were home at the time; the president was not in Washington, D.C., having been on a trip abroad. However, the couple's youngest daughter, Sasha, and the first lady's mother, Marian Shields Robinson, were in the White House. No one was injured. It took four days for the Secret Service to realize that bullets had struck the White House. Michelle Obama learned of the shooting from an usher, then summoned Mark J. Sullivan, director of the Secret Service, to find out why the first family had not been informed.

In September 2013, Ortega-Hernandez pleaded guilty to one count of property destruction and one count of discharging a firearm during a crime of violence, thereby avoiding being charged with an attempt to assassinate the President. In March 2014, he was sentenced to 25 years' imprisonment. In September 2014, The Washington Post published an investigative report detailing errors that the Secret Service made on the night of the shooting that led to the crime going undiscovered. A House of Representatives hearing followed and Julia Pierson, director of the Secret Service, resigned the following week. It was the first shooting at the White House since Francisco Martin Duran's attempted assassination of President Bill Clinton in 1994.

== Background ==
Oscar Ramiro Ortega-Hernandez, an unemployed 21-year-old man, left his home in Idaho Falls, Idaho, on October 23, three weeks prior to the shooting. He told his friends and family that he was going to Utah for a business trip; his family reported him missing on October 31 after he failed to return. According to friends, Ortega-Hernandez had become increasingly paranoid before leaving, saying that the United States government was controlling citizens and that President Barack Obama "had to be stopped"; he also believed Obama was the Antichrist. The mother of Ortega-Hernandez's former fiancée stated that he had been well-mannered for the four years she had known him, but had recently started making bizarre statements. On July 8, he had told an acquaintance that Obama was planning to put GPS tracking devices into children and that the world would end in 2012. In September, he made a video for Oprah Winfrey, explaining that he was Jesus and asking to appear on her television show. On his 21st birthday in October, he made a 45-minute speech on various topics including a warning of the dangers of secret societies. He also stated that he was on a personal mission from God. Ortega-Hernandez has been described as a religious extremist, though he was not found to be affiliated with any extremist groups.

Ortega-Hernandez arrived in Washington on November 9 with 180 rounds of ammunition and a Romanian-made Cugir WASR semiautomatic rifle that he had purchased from a gun shop in Idaho. On the morning of the shooting, he was reported for suspicious behavior in a local park. Police questioned him, but he refused to let police search his car. After photographing him, police officers let him go as they had no cause to make an arrest.

At the time of the shooting, Ortega-Hernandez had a 2-year-old son with his former fiancée; it is unknown when or why they separated.

== Shooting and response ==
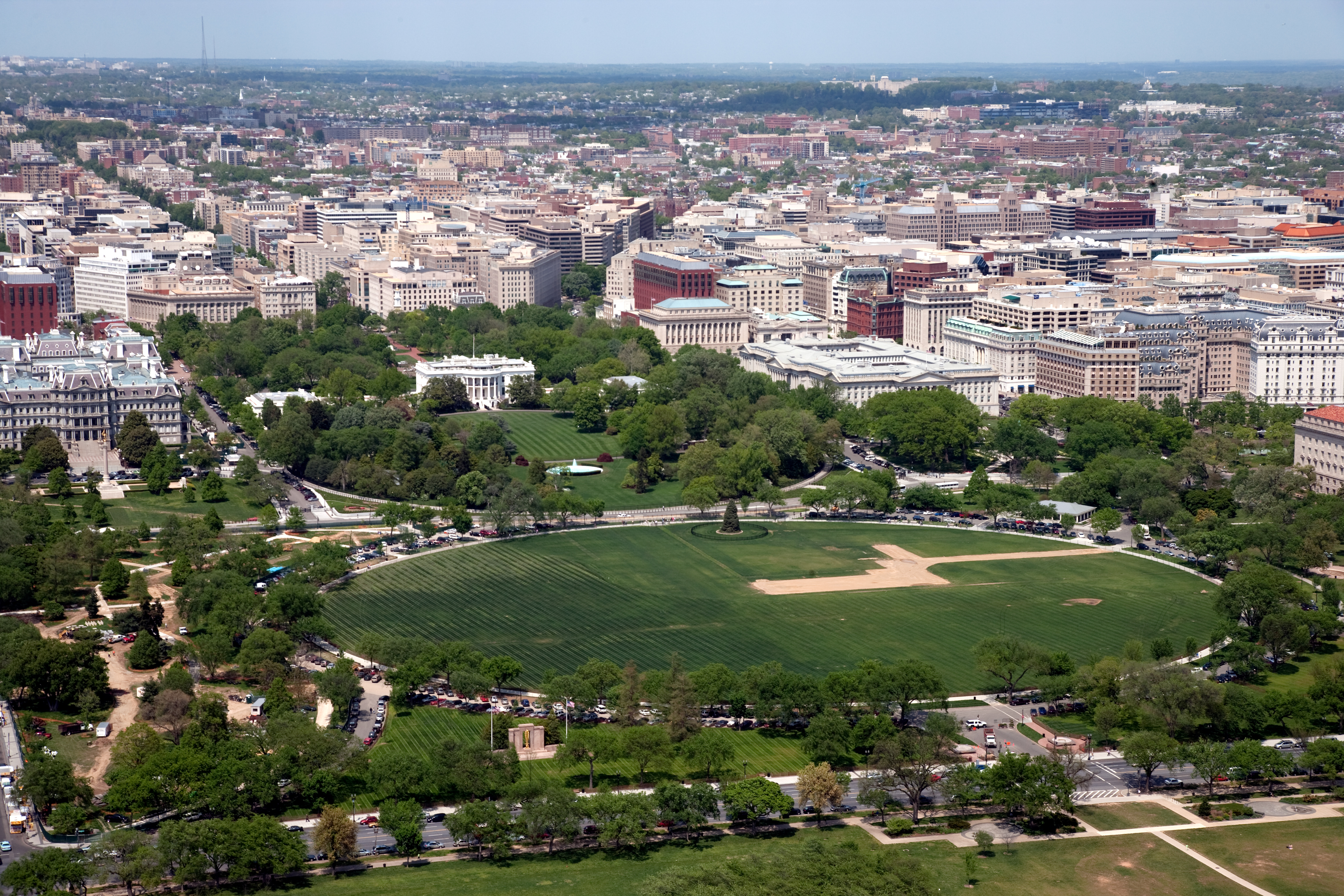
An aerial view of the White House, showing the Constitution Avenue intersection at the bottom right, from where the shots were fired

On November 11, Ortega-Hernandez parked his vehicle on Constitution Avenue, 750 yards (690 m) directly south of the White House. He aimed his semi-automatic rifle from the car's passenger seat and fired. Gunfire was reported around 9 pm. One bullet hit an antique window on the White House's second floor near the first family's formal living room; however, it did not penetrate the bulletproof glass on the inside. One bullet lodged in a window frame, and others ricocheted off the roof, causing small pieces of wood and concrete to fall to the ground. At least seven bullets struck the second floor, causing $97,000 worth of damage. A woman in a taxi nearby witnessed the shooting and wrote on Twitter, "Driver in front of my cab STOPPED and fired 5 gun shots at the White House. It took the police a while to respond." President Obama, his wife Michelle, and their oldest daughter Malia were not home at the time of the shooting, although their younger daughter Sasha and Michelle's mother Marian Shields Robinson were. When the shooting occurred, Malia was coming home and was expected to arrive at any moment.

Secret Service agents initially rushed to respond. Snipers scanned the South Lawn, looking for an assailant. A supervisor then decided that the noises were backfires from a nearby construction site and told the agents, "No shots have been fired ... stand down", to the surprise of several officers. According to Carol D. Leonnig, agents who thought the building had been fired upon "were largely ignored", with one reporting she had been afraid to doubt her superior's assertion. By the end of the night, it was confirmed that a shooting had occurred, although the Secret Service believed that gunfire was not aimed at the White House, but rather was the result of a gang fight nearby. A Secret Service dispatcher called emergency services and gave incorrect descriptions of both vehicles and suspects; police were told to look for two black men on Rock Creek Parkway. It took four days for the Secret Service to realize that bullets had struck the White House. The evidence was only noticed when a housekeeper discovered broken glass and pieces of cement on the Truman Balcony around midday on November 15.

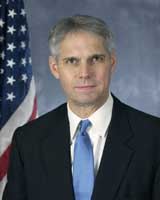
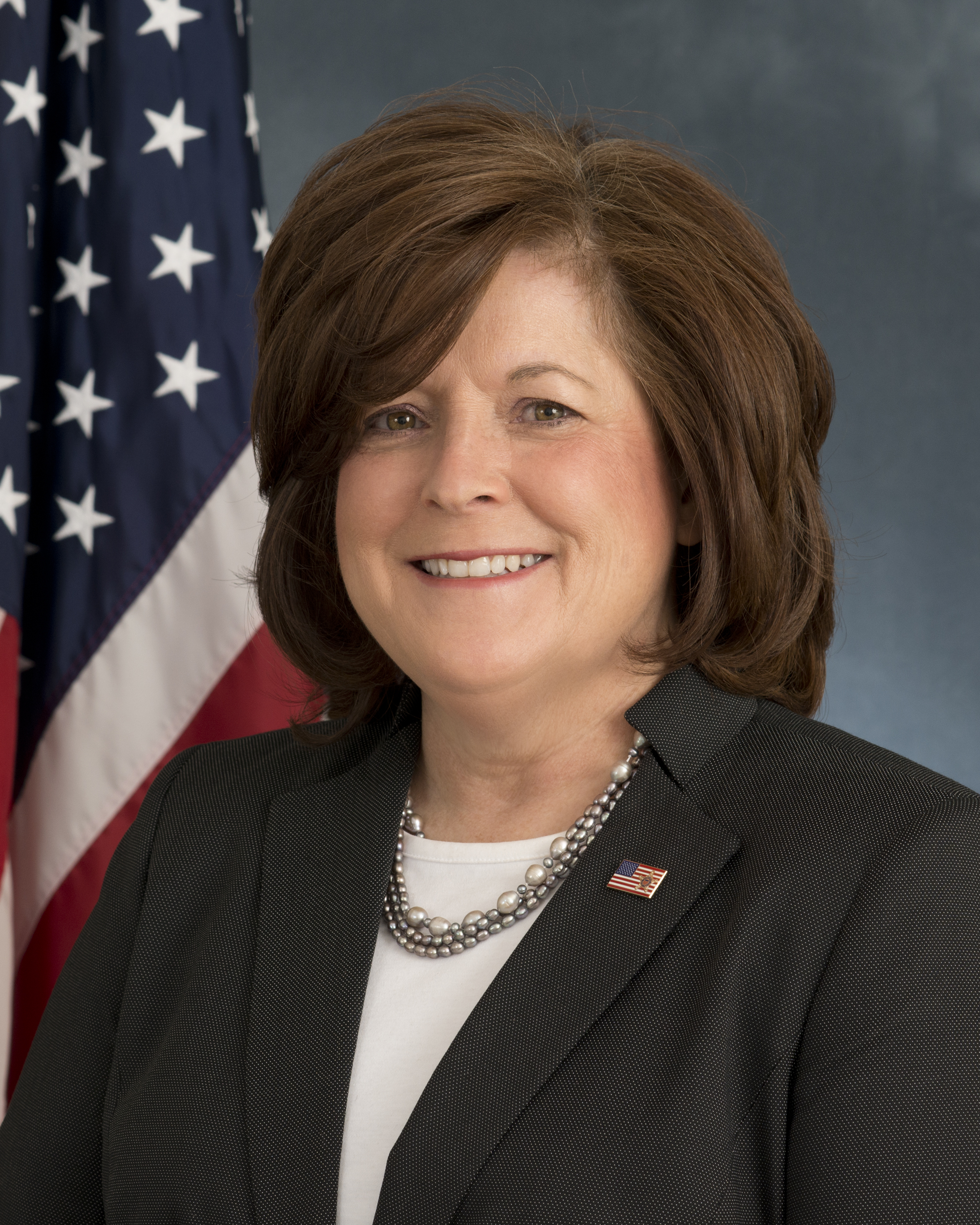
Mark J. Sullivan (left), then director of the Secret Service, was summoned to a meeting with the first lady regarding the shooting; Julia Pierson (right), who took over as director from Sullivan in 2013, resigned as a result of the 2011 shooting and other controversies.

President Obama was visiting Australia and Indonesia when the discovery was made. Michelle Obama had returned to the White House on the morning of November 15, going to sleep shortly after arriving. An usher went to check on her later that day and began talking about the shooting, assuming she already knew about the incident. According to Leonnig, the first lady was "furious", wondering why the director of the Secret Service, Mark J. Sullivan, who had accompanied her on her flight back to Washington, had not told her about it. Leonnig also stated that Sullivan was subsequently summoned to a meeting with the first lady, during which she raised her voice so loudly she could be heard through the closed door. Sullivan disputes this report, though he declined to give any details regarding the conversation. A detailed inspection of the White House for evidence or damage and interviews with key witnesses began later that afternoon. Leonnig also stated that President Obama was angered over the flawed response and the failure to notify the first lady. According to one presidential aide, "the shit really hit the fan" when Obama returned from his travels five days later.

Three years later, in September 2014, Carol D. Leonnig from The Washington Post released an investigative report describing the details of the Secret Service's "bungled" response following the shooting. The Secret Service responded to the criticism, stating that the shots were fired from a quarter-mile away, resulting in echoes obfuscating their origin, and that initial witness accounts stated that the shots were fired at another vehicle from a black vehicle. An agent who asked to remain anonymous stated, "I'm not saying this was our shining moment, but we never stopped looking for [the gunman]." A former agent stated that the Secret Service needed to change its ways in order to prevent "complacency" and stop future attacks. As a direct result of the attack, additional security measures, such as personnel changes and physical improvements including additional surveillance cameras, were implemented at the White House. It was the first shooting at the White House since Francisco Martin Duran's fired shots at President Bill Clinton from the fence overlooking the north lawn on October 29, 1994.

A week after The Washington Post released their report, Julia Pierson, who took over as director of the Secret Service from Sullivan in March 2013, testified at a United States House of Representatives hearing regarding security breaches at the White House. Pierson was criticized by Committee Chairman Darrell Issa regarding several security breaches. Issa stated, "The fact is, the system broke down ... when Oscar Ortega-Hernandez successfully shot at the White House on November 2011." Upon hearing that an agent was unwilling to doubt her superior's assertion, Representative Elijah Cummings stated to Pierson that it was "very disturbing to know that Secret Service agents in the most protective agency in the world feel more comfortable ... coming to members of this committee and telling things than coming to you and members in the agency." Pierson acknowledged that the incident was "extremely" troubling. As a result of the 2011 shooting and other controversies, Pierson resigned from her position on October 1, 2014.

== Arrest and trial ==
U.S. Marshals mugshot of Oscar Ramiro Ortega-Hernandez

Leonnig described Ortega-Hernandez's arrest as "sheer luck". He crashed a black 1998 Honda Accord, registered in his name, several blocks from the White House shortly after the shooting. He abandoned his vehicle with his firearm still inside, along with three loaded magazines, nine spent shell casings, and brass knuckles. On November 13, the United States Park Police obtained a warrant for Ortega-Hernandez's arrest based on weapons charges regarding his abandoned rifle, although he was still not suspected of shooting at the White House. Around the same time, Secret Service agents learned from his friends and family that he was obsessed with President Obama, and the agents began canvassing Washington in an attempt to find him. When the damage to the White House was discovered on November 15, Ortega-Hernandez became the prime suspect for the shooting. On November 16, he was arrested in a hotel in Indiana, Pennsylvania, after an employee there recognized him and contacted police. Federal prosecutors launched an investigation to determine if he had acted out of hatred for Obama.

In September 2013, Ortega-Hernandez pled guilty to two of the nineteen charges against him: one count of destruction of property and one count of discharging a firearm during a crime of violence. As part of his plea bargain, the remaining charges were dropped, including the charge of attempting to assassinate the President, which carried a maximum penalty of life imprisonment. On March 31, 2014, Ortega-Hernandez was sentenced to 25 years imprisonment by Judge Rosemary M. Collyer. His lawyers had asked for a 10-year sentence, stating Ortega-Hernandez was suffering from depression and stress. Prosecutors had asked for the maximum sentence of 27½ years. He is serving his sentence at Federal Correctional Institution, Herlong, with a release date of June 21, 2033.

== See also ==
- List of incidents of political violence in Washington, D.C.
- List of United States presidential assassination attempts and plots
- List of White House security breaches
- Religious terrorism
- Security incidents involving Barack Obama
