= Ronald L. Rowe Jr. =

American law enforcement officer

Ronald Rowe
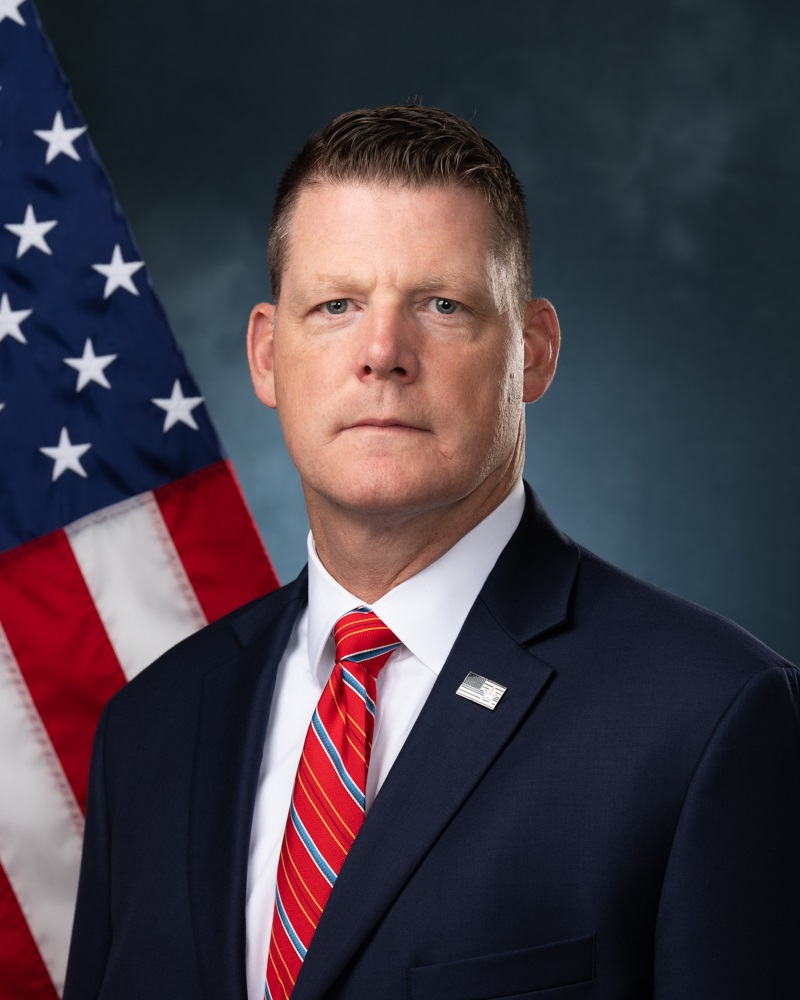
- Official portrait, 2017

Director of the United States Secret Service
- Acting
- In office July 23, 2024 – January 22, 2025
- President: Joe Biden; Donald Trump
- Preceded by: Kimberly Cheatle
- Succeeded by: Sean M. Curran

Deputy Director of the United States Secret Service
- In office April 2023 – January 22, 2025
- President: Joe Biden; Donald Trump
- Succeeded by: Matthew C. Quinn

Personal details
- Born: November 11, 1971 (age 54)
- Education: University of Maryland, College Park (BA); Lynn University (MS)
- Rowe's voice Rowe's opening statement at the final task force hearing on the attempted assassination of Donald Trump in Pennsylvania; Recorded December 5, 2024

Ronald L. Rowe Jr. (born November 11, 1971) is an American law enforcement officer who served as deputy director of the United States Secret Service from 2023 to 2025 and its acting director from mid 2024 to early 2025. Rowe was appointed to the position after former Secret Service director Kimberly Cheatle resigned in 2024, amidst intense criticism of the Secret Service following the attempted assassination of Donald Trump in Pennsylvania.

== Early life and education ==
Rowe graduated in 1994 with a Bachelor of Arts (BA) in Criminology and Criminal Justice from the University of Maryland in College Park. In 2007, he obtained a Master of Science (MSc) in Administration from Lynn University in Boca Raton, Florida. He completed the Executive Leaders Program in Homeland Defense and Security in 2019, at the Naval Postgraduate School in Monterey, California.

== Career ==
In 1995, Rowe joined the West Palm Beach Police Department and worked there as a patrol officer for four years, rising to the rank of Sergeant.

In 1999, Rowe began working for the Secret Service. As a National Security and Law Enforcement Policy Advisor in 2011, he supported the National Security Council in formulating the President's counterstrategies against state-sponsored economic espionage and the theft of intellectual property, including trade secrets, from the United States. In addition, he was honored for his appointment to the Presidential Protective Detail, which he served in from 2004 to 2008 while stationed in New York City as part of the Secret Service's September 11 attacks response. He was later a staff member of the United States Senate Committee on the Judiciary from 2008 to 2011.

In addition to coordinating significant security operations, Rowe has worked with numerous governmental and law enforcement organizations over his tenure with the U.S. Secret Service. Throughout federal, state, and local governments, he coordinated the activities of nearly 7,000 personnel during a National Special Security Event (NSSE) in 2016. Regarding cybersecurity, Rowe led the creation of several analytical products while serving as a joint duty assignment to the National Intelligence Council in 2013. Later, the U.S. Intelligence Community regarded their products as some of the most authoritative assessments of the difficulties and risks to national security that the country faced.

Rowe held executive positions as the director's chief of staff in 2021, the Office of Protective Operations' deputy assistant director from 2018 to 2021, and the Office of Intergovernmental and Legislative Affairs' deputy assistant director from 2017 to 2018. Subsequently, he worked for the agency as the Office of Intergovernmental and Legislative Affairs Assistant Director. He was in charge of overseeing the Secret Service's interactions with the Homeland Security Department, Congress, and other governmental entities. In April 2023, he was appointed the Secret Service's Deputy Director. In this capacity, Rowe was in charge of directly supervising the agency's everyday protection and investigative activities. In addition to overseeing the agency's policy, he brought newer technologies to strengthen its defensive countermeasures.

Secret Service Director Kimberly Cheatle, who was in Milwaukee, Wisconsin, on July 13, 2024, during the attempted assassination of Donald Trump in Butler, Pennsylvania, was criticized and deemed the agency's performance as "unacceptable," but she declined to step down. On July 17, Rowe gave a briefing to lawmakers regarding the progress of the investigation into the incident and the shortcomings of the Secret Service. In a Wall Street Journal interview, he stood up for the director amid increasing calls for her dismissal, stating, "When you're in the midst of a crisis, it takes toughness. It takes intelligence. And it takes also a little bit of strategy." He went on to say: "And she is demonstrating all of those traits at this time." On July 23, 2024, Cheatle announced her resignation in the face of mounting criticism for security failings and calls for her resignation from Republicans as well as Democrats.

=== Acting director of the United States Secret Service ===
On July 23, 2024, Alejandro N. Mayorkas, the Secretary of Homeland Security, who oversees the Secret Service, named Rowe as the agency's interim head. In a staff letter obtained by the Associated Press, Rowe stated, "At this moment in time, we must remain focused." "We will rebuild the American public's trust and confidence, as well as the trust placed in us to protect them," he continued.

In testimony before the U.S. Congress in September 2024, Rowe described the attempted assassination of Trump in Pennsylvania as a "failure on multiple levels". After another suspected assassination attempt against Trump took place in Florida, Rowe praised a secret service agent for defending Trump, while acknowledging that the Secret Service failed to sweep the golf course where the attempt took place. Following the two assassination attempts against Trump, Rowe ordered a "paradigm shift" for the Secret Service's protective duties, stating that the agency needed to move from a "reactive model" to a "readiness model."

Rowe clashes with Fallon while testifying before Congress

In December 2024, Rowe testified before Congress, taking responsibility for the agency’s failures and outlining corrective measures. He announced initiatives including enhanced technical assets, expanded staffing, improved retention efforts, and a new "chief wellness officer" to support mental health. These reforms aimed to address gaps in intelligence, communication, and protective protocols. The hearing, driven by a bipartisan investigation, included tense exchanges. U.S. representative Pat Fallon criticized Rowe for not deploying additional protective units and for his absence from the rally site after the attack. Rowe refused to answer questions, emphasizing ongoing improvements and rejecting claims of politicizing his role.

Rowe has prioritized preparing the Secret Service for future challenges, including the 2028 United States presidential election, with plans to hire nearly 1,000 new special agents by 2025. His leadership also focused on cultural reform, leadership development, and collaboration with partners like DARPA to incorporate advanced technologies, such as autonomous security systems at high-profile sites.
