= Hiram C. Whitley =

Second chief of United States Secret Service

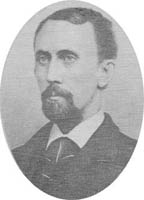

2nd Chief of the United States Secret Service
- In office 1869 – 1875
- President: Ulysses S. Grant
- Preceded by: William P. Wood
- Succeeded by: Elmer Washburn

Personal details
- Born: August 6, 1834 Camden, Maine, U.S.
- Died: April 19, 1919 (aged 84) Emporia, Kansas, U.S.
- Parent(s): William Whitley; Hannah D. McCoombs

Military service
- Battles/wars: American Civil War

Colonel Hiram C. Whitley (August 6, 1834 – April 19, 1919) was the second Chief of the United States Secret Service.

== Early life ==
Whitley was born in Camden, Maine on August 6, 1834 to Dr. William Whitley, a Glasgow-born doctor and surgeon, and Hannah D. McCoombs, a Maine local. In 1840, his family moved to Lake County, Ohio, where he became a pupil at the Western Reserve Teachers' Seminary, a Mormon teaching school in Kirtland.

Leaving school at the age of fifteen, he became a drover for two years, after which he moved to Massachusetts where he worked for his uncle in the fishing industry at Gloucester. In 1856, Whitley married Catherine Webster (Katie) Bates of Cambridge; they subsequently had two daughters, Katie and Sabra. The following year, the Whitleys moved to the recently founded Lawrence, Kansas, where he worked in the grocery trade. In 1859, being drawn to Pike's Peak Gold Rush, Whitley sold out of his grocery business and moved to Colorado, where he failed to strike gold. Moving on, the Whitleys settled in New Orleans, with Whitley working the Red River as a steamboatman.

== American Civil War ==
In the year from April 1861, when the American Civil War commenced, through to April 1862, Whitley continued to work the Red River. He professed some sympathy for the Confederacy, and drilled with local companies without seeing active service. He was on the Starlight at Shreveport, 700 miles (1,100 km) from New Orleans when it was seized by a Confederate committee, who aimed to use it to blockade the river against Union forces. Having heard of the Union Army's capture of New Orleans on April 25, Whitley, the "mulatto" second cook, and another "liberty loving African", stole the steamer's yawl. Travelling mainly by night, they reached New Orleans in seven days.^{,}

There, Whitley reported to Major General B.F. Butler. Butler referred him to the provost-marshal of the Department of the Gulf, Colonel Jonas H. French, who employed Whitley as a detective.

Whitley declined an offer of a captaincy in the Fifth Louisiana Regiment by the General in charge of New Orleans's defence, William H. Emory. Instead, he was appointed as a Major in the Seventh Louisiana Regiment.

== Chief of the Secret Service ==
Whitley was appointed chief of the United States Secret Service by President Ulysses S. Grant in 1869, four years after its inception. Under Whitley, the Secret Service introduced criminal files, a written Code of Conduct, and an official badge for its agents. Whitley, whose successful arrest of 12 Klansmen in Georgia for the murder of a leading local Republican official had led to his appointment by Grant, used talented detectives who infiltrated and broke up KKK units in North Carolina and Alabama. However they could not penetrate the main hotbed of KKK activity in upstate South Carolina. Grant sent in Army troops but Whitley's agents learned that KKK members were lying low until the troops were withdrawn. Informed of this by Whitley, Grant's Attorney General Amos T. Akerman convinced Grant to declare martial law and send in US marshals backed by federal troops to arrest 500 Klansmen; hundred more fled the state, and hundreds of others surrendered in return for leniency.

Whitley was allegedly part of the so-called 1874 safe burglary conspiracy. He resigned as chief (being succeeded by Elmer Washburn) and faced trial for conspiracy, which ended with a hung jury. The D.C. Supreme Court subsequently found the grand jury which indicted Whitley and others to have been illegally drawn, and the Attorney-General ordered nolle prosequi for the case.

== Later life ==
He retired to Emporia, Kansas where he became a leading businessman.

Whitley died aged 84 in Emporia on April 19, 1919, from an "inflammation of the bladder".

== Works ==
- In It (1894)
- Lane, Charles. Freedom's Detective: The Secret Service, the Ku Klux Klan and the Man Who Masterminded America's First War on Terror. (Toronto, Canada: Hanover Square Press, 2019) ISBN 978-1-335-04496-9.

Government offices
Preceded by William P. Wood	Chief, United States Secret Service; 1869–1874	Succeeded by Elmer Washburn
