= Federal Correctional Institution, Three Rivers =

Medium-security prison in Texas, US

Coordinates: 28°26′39″N 98°19′29″W

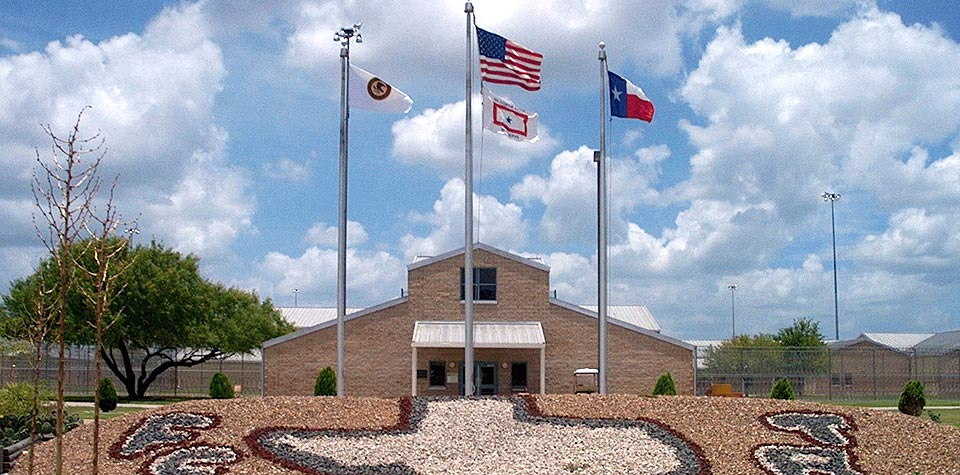
- Interactive map of Federal Correctional Institution, Three Rivers
- Location: Live Oak County, near Three Rivers, Texas
- Status: Operational
- Security class: Medium-security (with minimum-security prison camp)
- Population: 1,147 (187 in prison camp)
- Managed by: Federal Bureau of Prisons
- Warden: Ralph Hanson

The Federal Correctional Institution, Three Rivers (FCI Three Rivers) is a medium-security United States federal prison for male inmates in unincorporated Live Oak County, Texas. It is operated by Federal Bureau of Prisons, a division of the United States Department of Justice. The facility also has an adjacent satellite prison camp which houses minimum-security male offenders.

FCI Three Rivers is approximately 80 miles (130 km) south of San Antonio and 73 miles (117 km) northwest of Corpus Christi.

== Notable incidents ==
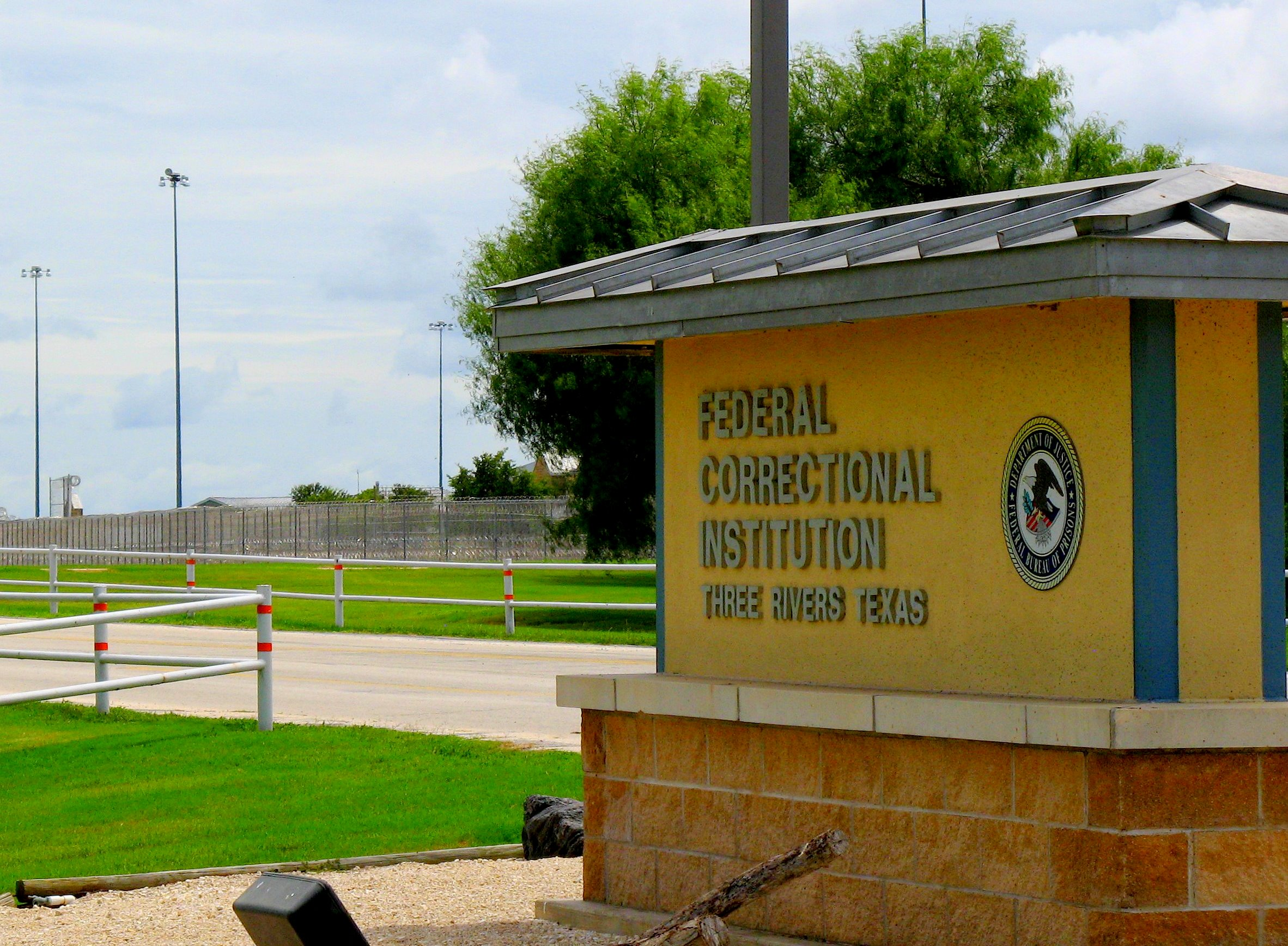
Entrance

In 2008, a riot occurred between members of rival prison gangs at FCI Three Rivers which left 22 prisoners injured and one dead. Fifteen of the injured were transported to hospitals in Corpus Christi and San Antonio. The deceased inmate was identified as 40-year-old Servando Rodriguez of Nuevo Laredo, Tamaulipas, Mexico. Sources at the prison told the San Antonio Express-News that one gang consisted of American-born Chicanos and the other of Mexican citizens known as "Paisas."

Between 2012 and 2014, Joel Gonzalez, a corrections officer at the prison, smuggled in contraband in exchange for bribe money from the family of an inmate. His wife, Lisa Gonzalez, assisted in arranging times and places for the exchange of the cash and contraband goods; she worked at the Texas Department of Criminal Justice at the time. They each pled guilty to conspiracy to commit bribery in 2014, and they were sentenced to, respectively, 24 months and 10 months in federal prison in November of that year.

== Notable inmates (current and former) ==
Inmate Name	Register Number	Status	Details
Barrett Brown	45047-177	Served a 63-month sentence; released May 25, 2017.	Journalist associated with the computer hacking group Anonymous and founder of Project PM, an unofficial watchdog for the surveillance industry; pleaded guilty in 2014 to posting a video threatening an FBI Agent and disclosing details regarding an upcoming search warrant execution.
Michael Center	282214-480	Served a 6-month sentence; released on October 4, 2020.	Charged with connection to the 2019 college admissions bribery scandal.
Russell DeBusk	25730-001	Transferred to state prison in 2012 after serving 5 years.	Former student at Birmingham–Southern College; pleaded guilty in 2006 to conspiring to commit civil rights violations and arson in connection with setting fires at nine black churches in Alabama in 2006; two accomplices were also sentenced to prison.
Francisco Martin Duran	19588-016	Serving a 40 year sentence; set to be released on February 3, 2029	Convicted of attempting to assassinate President Bill Clinton on October 29, 1994, after opening fire on the White House.

== See also ==
- List of U.S. federal prisons
- Federal Bureau of Prisons
- Incarceration in the United States
