= James M. Murray =

American law enforcement officer

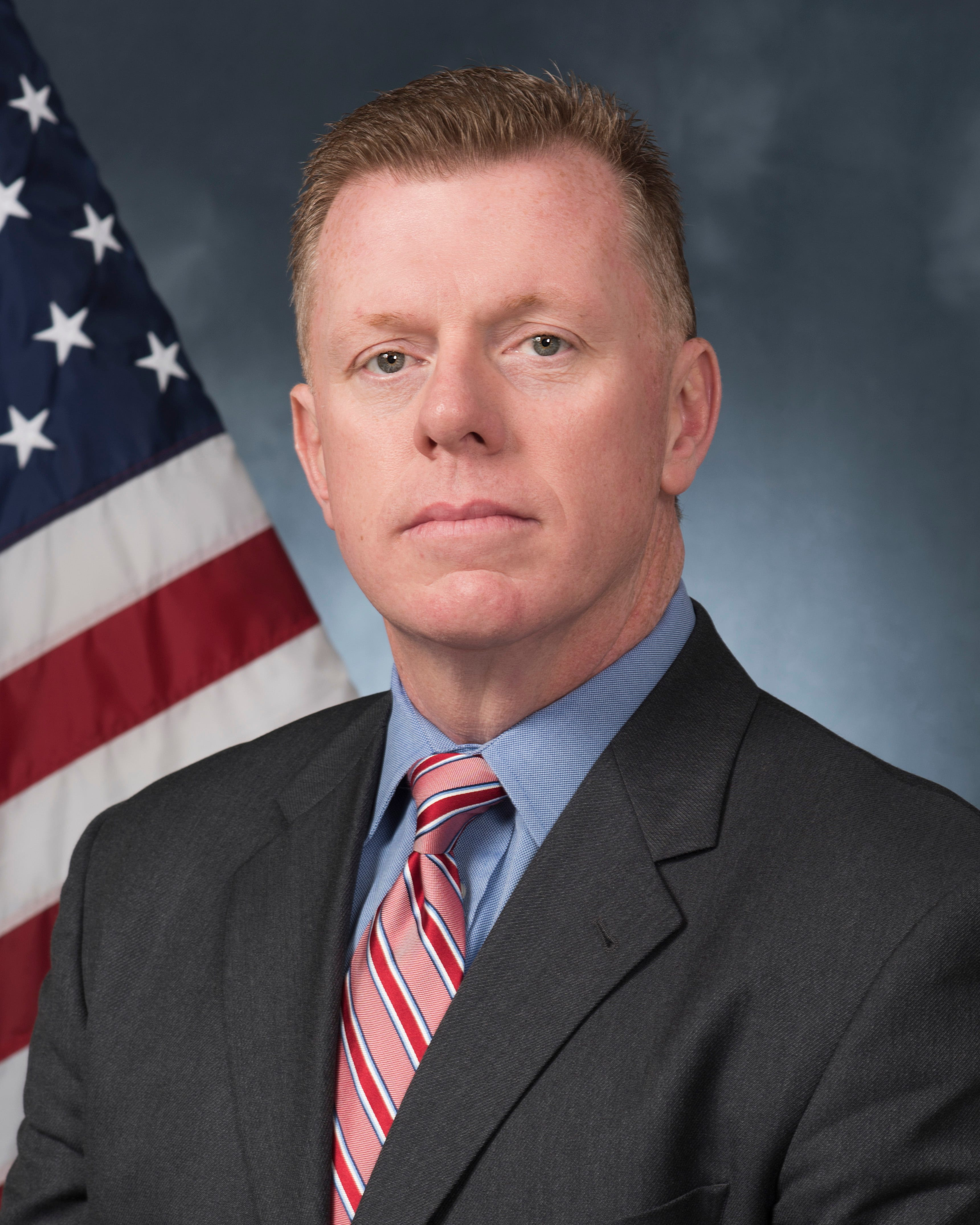
- Official portrait, 2019

26th Director of the United States Secret Service
- In office May 1, 2019 – September 17, 2022
- President: Donald Trump; Joe Biden
- Deputy: William J. Callahan; Leon Newsome III; Faron K. Paramore
- Preceded by: Randolph Alles
- Succeeded by: Kimberly Cheatle

Personal details
- Born: Point Pleasant, New Jersey, U.S.
- Education: University of Scranton; Seton Hall University

James M. Murray is an American former law enforcement officer who served as the 26th director of the United States Secret Service from 2019 to 2022.

== Early life and education ==
Born in Point Pleasant, New Jersey, Murray attended St. Rose High School. Murray earned a bachelor's degree from the private University of Scranton and a master's degree from the private Seton Hall University.

== Career ==
Murray began his career in law enforcement as a Special Agent/Investigator with the United States Department of Transportation. He joined the Secret Service in 1995 as a Special Agent in the New York Field Office, where he investigated cyber-enabled financial crimes and served as the agency's representative for the FBI–NYPD Joint Terrorism Task Force. In 2001, he transferred to the Presidential Protective Division, which safeguards the President and his immediate family. In 2005, he was promoted to Assistant to the Special Agent in Charge of Presidential Protection.

In 2007, Murray became the Secret Service's liaison to the United States Congress and all entities on Capitol Hill. He served as the operational site supervisor for multiple National Special Security Events, including the inauguration of President Barack Obama on January 20, 2009. Afterwards, he became the Resident Agent in Charge of the Secret Service's Atlantic City Resident Office. In 2012, Murray became the Assistant Special Agent in Charge of the James J. Rowley Training Center in Laurel, Maryland.

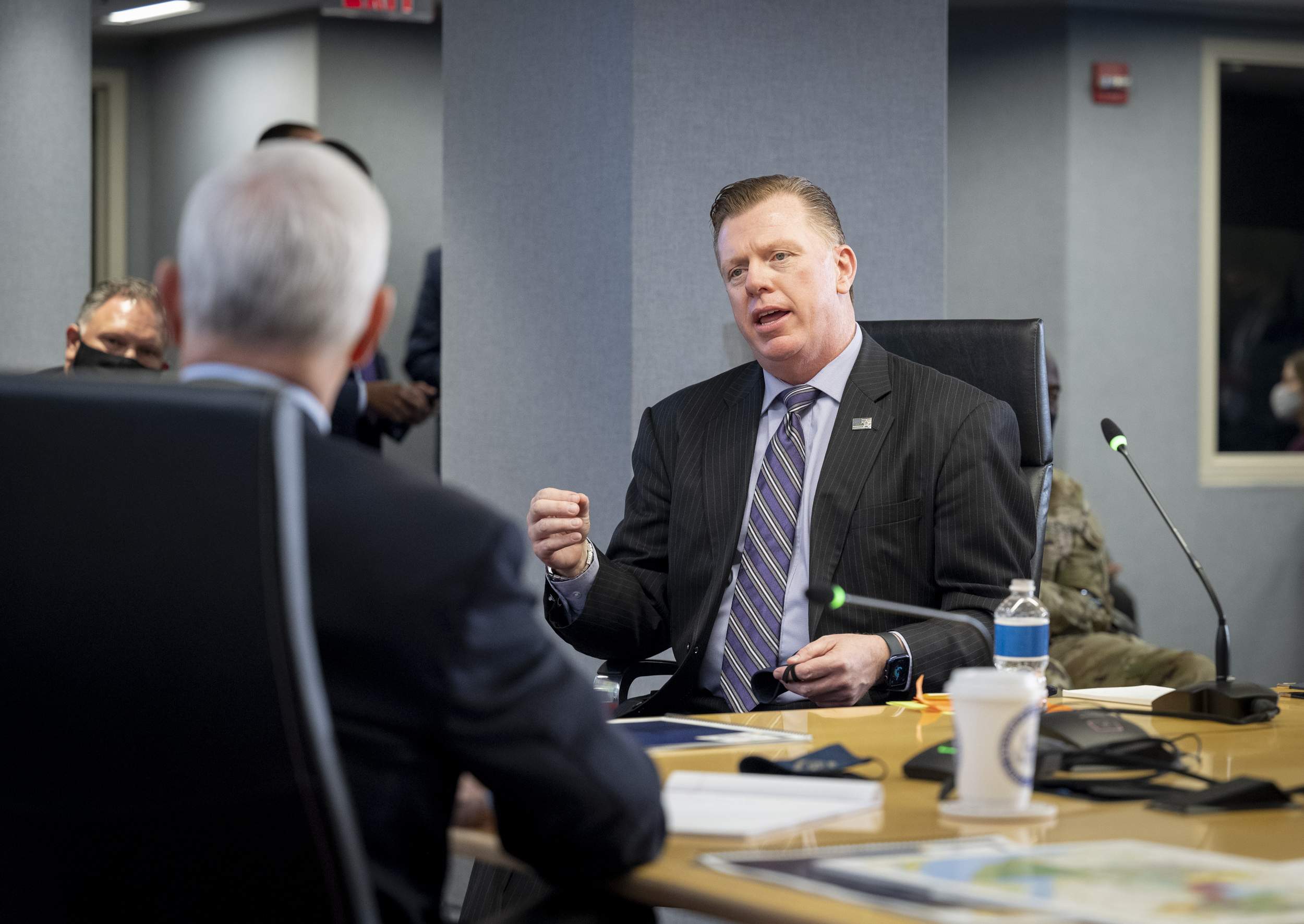
Murray participates in a brief on Inauguration Security with Vice President Pence.

In 2014, Murray became the Acting Special Agent in Charge of the Secret Service's Washington, D.C. Field Office. He was promoted to the position and continued to lead the field office until 2016. From 2016 to 2018, he served as Deputy Assistant Director of Protective Operations, during which he led combined agency efforts for the presidential campaigns ahead of the 2016 U.S. presidential election, the presidential transition, and the inauguration of President Donald Trump on January 20, 2017. He returned to the James J. Rowley Training Center as the Special Agent in Charge.

In April 2018, Murray became the Assistant Director of the Office of Protective Operations and was responsible for the planning, coordination, and administration of the agency's global protective mission. On April 8, 2019, President Donald Trump removed Randolph Alles as Director of the U.S. Secret Service and named Murray as his replacement. He took office on May 1, 2019.

On July 7, 2022, Murray announced his retirement as Secret Service Director, to take effect July 30, 2022. Murray will take the role of Chief Security Officer at Snap Inc., parent company of Snapchat, on August 1, 2022. However, he announced on July 28, 2022 that he would "briefly" delay his retirement, in connection with the investigation into missing Secret Service records (see below). He left office on September 17, 2022.

=== Missing records investigation ===
On July 14, 2022, it was reported that "Members of the U.S. Secret Service erased text messages from January 5th and 6th, 2021, shortly after the Department of Homeland Security inspector general requested them as part of an investigation into the agency's response to the 2021 United States Capitol attack, according to a letter written by the inspector general to congressional leaders (...)" The next day the Select Committee to Investigate the January 6th Attack on the United States Capitol sent a subpoena to Murray seeking, "(...) the relevant text messages, as well as any after action reports that have been issued in any and all divisions of the USSS pertaining or relating in any way to the events of January 6, 2021." On July 20, 2022, Gladys Ayala, the Deputy Inspector General (IG) of the Department of Homeland Security notified the Secret Service that her office was investigating the disappearance of text messages and emails regarding the siege of the U.S. Capitol on January 6, 2021, characterizing their disappearance as an "ongoing criminal investigation." She directed the Secret Service to cease any internal investigations into the matter of failure of the agency to preserve the missing records.
