= Joseph Clancy (Secret Service) =

American law enforcement agent

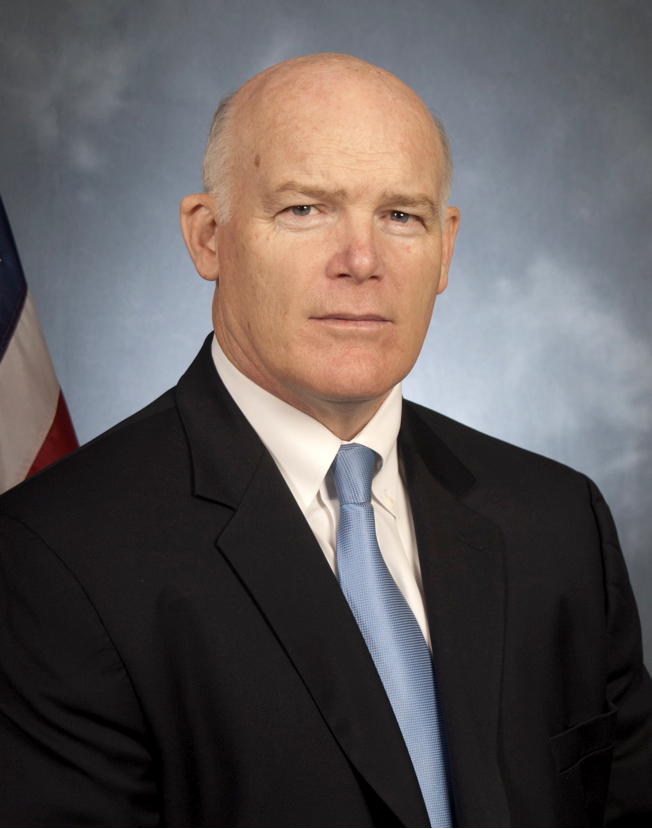

24th Director of the United States Secret Service
- In office October 1, 2014 – March 4, 2017
- President: Barack Obama; Donald Trump
- Deputy: A.T. Smith; Craig Magaw; William J. Callahan
- Preceded by: Julia Pierson
- Succeeded by: Randolph Alles

Personal details
- Education: U.S. Military Academy; Villanova University (BA)

Joseph "Joe" P. Clancy is an American law enforcement official. He was the 24th Director of the United States Secret Service. Clancy previously served as head of the agency's presidential protection division until 2011, when he retired and became director of corporate security for Comcast.

== Early life and education ==
Clancy grew up in the Philadelphia area. He graduated from Archbishop Carroll High School in Radnor, Pennsylvania, then attended the United States Military Academy at West Point, where he excelled on West Point's football team. Clancy transferred to Villanova University and graduated in the late 1970s.

== Career ==
After graduating from Villanova, Clancy worked as a history teacher for four years at the former Bishop Kenrick High School in Norristown, Pennsylvania, and then for a year at Father Judge High School in Philadelphia.

Clancy joined the United States Secret Service in Philadelphia in the 1980s. Subsequently, he worked in the New York field office, directing a team of agents that conducted major investigations. He was in charge of security at national special events before joining the president's protective detail.

During his work on the presidential protection details he was able to achieve a close bond with President Barack Obama, and was well regarded by the Obama administration. Clancy was part of the Secret Service protective detail that jogged with President Bill Clinton in the early days of his presidency.

Clancy was appointed as acting director following the resignation of Julia Pierson on October 1, 2014, a position he held until his appointment as director on February 18, 2015, by President Obama.

On February 14, 2017, Clancy announced his retirement, effective March 4, 2017.
