= William P. Wood =

American military member (1820–1903)

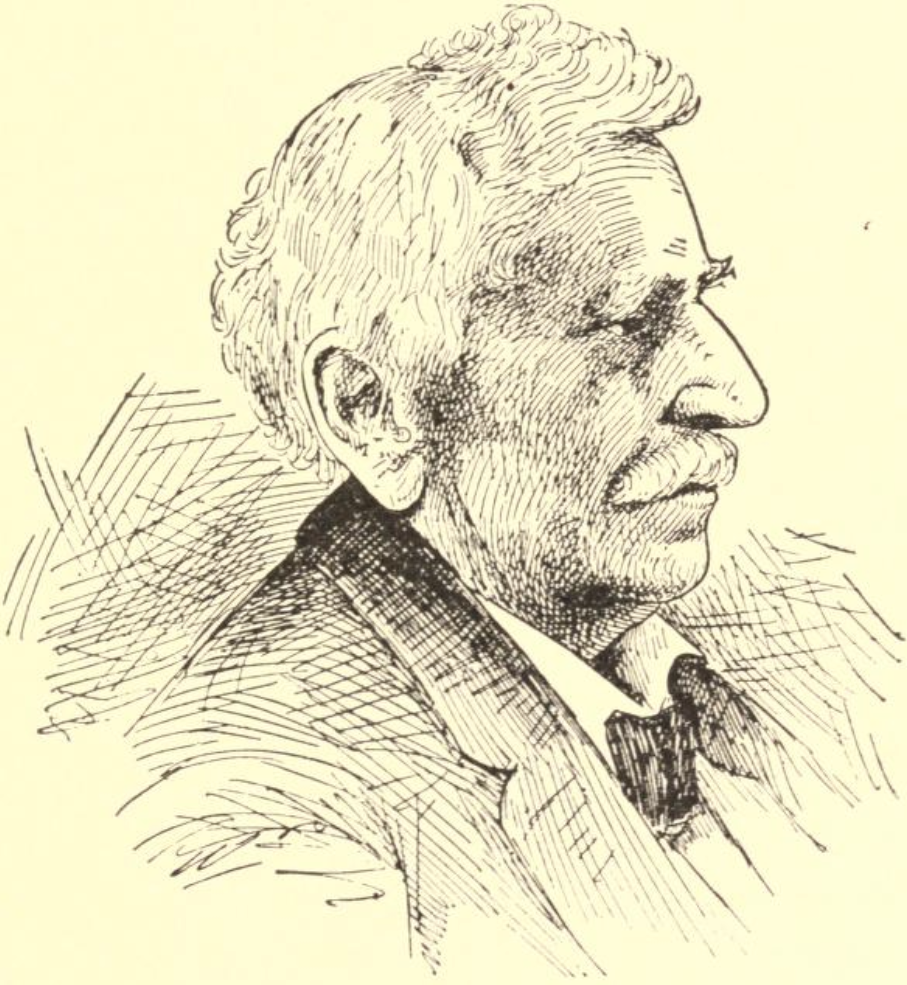
- Sketch of Wood in 1911 publication

1st Chief of the United States Secret Service
- In office July 5, 1865 – 1869
- President: Andrew Johnson
- Preceded by: Office established
- Succeeded by: Hiram C. Whitley

Personal details
- Born: March 11, 1820 Alexandria, Virginia, U.S.
- Died: March 20, 1903 (aged 83) Washington, D.C., U.S.
- Resting place: Congressional Cemetery; Washington, D.C., U.S.
- Party: Whig; Know-Nothing Party
- Spouse: Harriet Elizabeth Smith (m. 1849; died 1899)
- Children: 6
- Occupation: Soldier; lawyer; investigator

Military service
- Branch/service: United States Army
- Years of service: 1847–1848
- Unit: 3rd Regular Cavalry
- Battles/wars: Mexican–American War; American Civil War

William P. Wood (March 11, 1820 – March 20, 1903) was a soldier in the United States Army during the Mexican–American War. He was the first chief of the United States Secret Service.

== Early life ==
William P. Wood was born on March 11, 1820, in Alexandria, Virginia. His father was an engraver and die sinker. At a young age, his family moved to Washington, D.C..

== Career ==
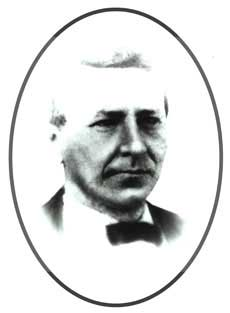

In early 1847, Wood enlisted in Cumberland, Maryland, with the 3rd Regular Cavalry in the Mexican–American War, under General Samuel Hamilton Walker. Following the arrest of Walker, the company disbanded and Wood was transferred to Company C. He left service on August 1, 1848, at Jefferson Barracks, Missouri. He then returned to Cumberland. His service gave him the nickname "The Daredevil Leader of Company C". He was a Whig. Although raised in the Catholic Church, he became an atheist and an active leader of the Know-Nothing Party.

After the war, he moved back to Washington, D.C., and worked as an attorney and specialized in patent cases. In the 1850s, Wood was called as an "expert witness" against Cyrus McCormick in the patent case for the mechanical reaper. In the years leading up to the Civil War, Wood was a conductor on the Underground Railroad, helping hundreds of former slaves escape to New England and Canada. Wood led drills and helped write a book of military tactics in preparation for John Brown's raid on Harpers Ferry, but ultimately objected to crossing state lines under arms and withdrew from the raid. Wood served in the American Civil War. On April 19, 1861, Wood led a sortie of eight armed men into Arlington Heights from Georgetown. In mid-July 1861, Wood was appointed by Secretary of War Edwin Stanton to be superintendent of the military prisons of the District of Columbia, principally the Old Capitol Prison. He remained in that role until resigning on June 30, 1865. He was given the equivalent pay of a colonel of cavalry and was referred to by others as "Colonel Wood". Secretary Stanton asked Wood to help Lafayette C. Baker investigate recruiting scandals in New York City. Wood notified the U.S. Navy of theft at the Brooklyn Navy Yard.

After the assassination of Abraham Lincoln, Wood was summoned back to Washington by an urgent telegram from Edwin Stanton to assist in the investigation. Following this, he was sworn in on July 5, 1865, by Secretary of the Treasury Hugh McCulloch to head the newly formed Secret Service. He was supervised by Treasury solicitor Edward P. Jordan. He set his base of operations near New York City, at Taylor's Hotel in Jersey City, New Jersey. During his time as head of the Secret Service, he captured Charles Ulrich, a counterfeiter based in Cincinnati, Ohio. He also helped capture William E. Brockway, the counterfeiter of 5/20 and 7/30 notes. Brockway went by the alias "William E. Spencer" and "Long Bill". He worked on the case between 1867 and 1868. After receiving news he was to be replaced in his role, he resigned his post on May 4, 1869. He was considered the best in battling financial crime, and within a year of its founding, the Secret Service had arrested over 200 counterfeiters. From around 1880 to his death, Wood tried to appeal to the U.S. Congress for money for his services while with the Treasury Department. He was unsuccessful, though there were three Senate bills for the action. He worked again as a patent attorney and ran a woodworking mill. He tried to turn the mill into a factory, but the operation ended around 1876. By 1893, Wood was bankrupt.

== Personal life ==
Following leaving the military, he married Harriet Elizabeth Smith of Cumberland, Maryland, in April 1849. After their wedding, they moved to Washington, D.C. He had five sons and one daughter, including Sam. His wife died in 1899. He was friends with Edwin Stanton.

He died of Bright's disease on March 20, 1903, at Soldiers' Home in Washington, D.C. At the time of his death, he was writing his memoirs. He was buried in the Congressional Cemetery in Washington, D.C.

Government offices
Preceded by Position established	Chief, United States Secret Service; 1865–1869	Succeeded by Hiram C. Whitley
