= Randolph Alles =

United States Marine Corps general (born 1954)

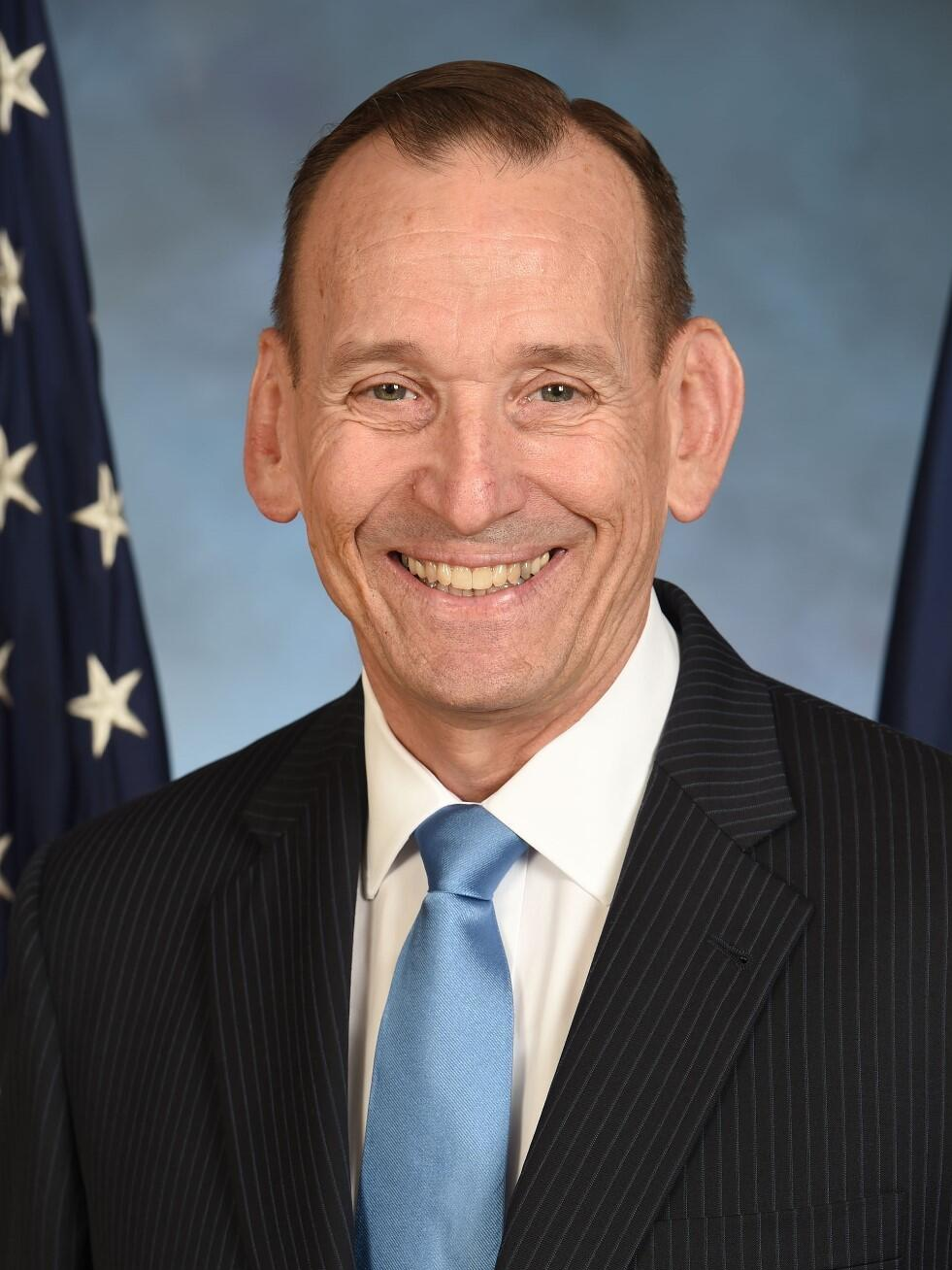
- Official portrait, 2021

Acting Under Secretary of Homeland Security for Management
- In office July 8, 2019 – March 25, 2025
- President: Donald Trump; Joe Biden; Donald Trump
- Preceded by: Chip Fulghum (acting)
- Succeeded by: Benjamine Huffman (acting)

Deputy Under Secretary of Homeland Security for Management
- In office July 8, 2019; Acting: May 7, 2019 – July 8, 2019 – March 25, 2025
- President: Donald Trump; Joe Biden; Donald Trump
- Preceded by: Chip Fulghum
- Succeeded by: Benjamine Huffman

25th Director of the United States Secret Service
- In office April 25, 2017 – May 1, 2019
- President: Donald Trump
- Deputy: William J. Callahan
- Preceded by: Joseph Clancy
- Succeeded by: James M. Murray

Acting Deputy Commissioner of the U.S. Customs and Border Protection
- In office January 20, 2017 – April 25, 2017
- President: Donald Trump
- Preceded by: Kevin McAleenan
- Succeeded by: Ron Vitiello (acting)

Personal details
- Born: 1954 (age 71–72) Houston, Texas, US
- Children: 2
- Education: Texas A&M University; Naval War College

Military service
- Allegiance: United States
- Branch/service: United States Marine Corps
- Years of service: 1976–2011
- Rank: Major General
- Unit: 3rd Marine Aircraft Wing
- Battles/wars: Operation Iraqi Freedom

Randolph D. "Tex" Alles (born 1954) is an American law enforcement officer and government official who had served as the Deputy Under Secretary of Homeland Security for Management and the de facto head of the DHS Management Directorate, under the various titles of both Acting Under Secretary and Senior Official Performing the Duties of Under Secretary. He also served as the 25th Director of the United States Secret Service from April 2017 to May 2019, and previously as the acting deputy commissioner of U.S. Customs and Border Protection, as well as in the United States Marine Corps, in which he reached the rank of major general.

== Early life and education ==
Alles graduated from Texas A&M University in 1976 and became a naval aviator in the Marines. He later earned a master's degree from the Naval War College in 1999.

== Career ==
Alles held positions in both the Marine Corps and joint combatant commands. He is a veteran of Operation Iraqi Freedom, commanding Marine Aircraft Group 11 and 3rd Marine Aircraft Wing. He retired as a major general.

Alles retired from the Marine Corps in 2011, after 35 years of military service, and joined U.S. Customs and Border Protection the following year. During his time with CBP, he served as the Deputy Executive Assistant Commissioner for Air and Marine Operations (AMO) until he was appointed Executive Assistant Commissioner for AMO in early 2013 until being appointed as acting Executive Assistant Commissioner of CBP's Enterprise Services in October 2016 before ultimately being appointed as Deputy Commissioner of CBP in January 2017.

On April 25, 2017, President Donald Trump appointed Alles as Director of the U.S. Secret Service. On April 8, 2019, CNN reported that Trump was preparing to remove Alles from office. Later that day, the White House confirmed Alles would be leaving at the end of April. Trump had reportedly grown disgruntled with Alles, and allegedly referred to him as "Dumbo".

In May 2019, Alles was appointed to perform the duties of Deputy Under Secretary of Homeland Security for Management, while Chip Fulghum served as Acting Under Secretary. In July 2019, Alles succeeded Furghum to become the Deputy Under Secretary of Homeland Security for Management and Acting Under Secretary of Homeland Security for Management. By November 2019, his acting status was removed, and was instead conferred the title of Senior Official Performing the Duties of the Under Secretary. He served under this title until he was once again made the Acting Under Secretary under the incoming Biden administration.
