= Kimberly Cheatle =

American law enforcement officer

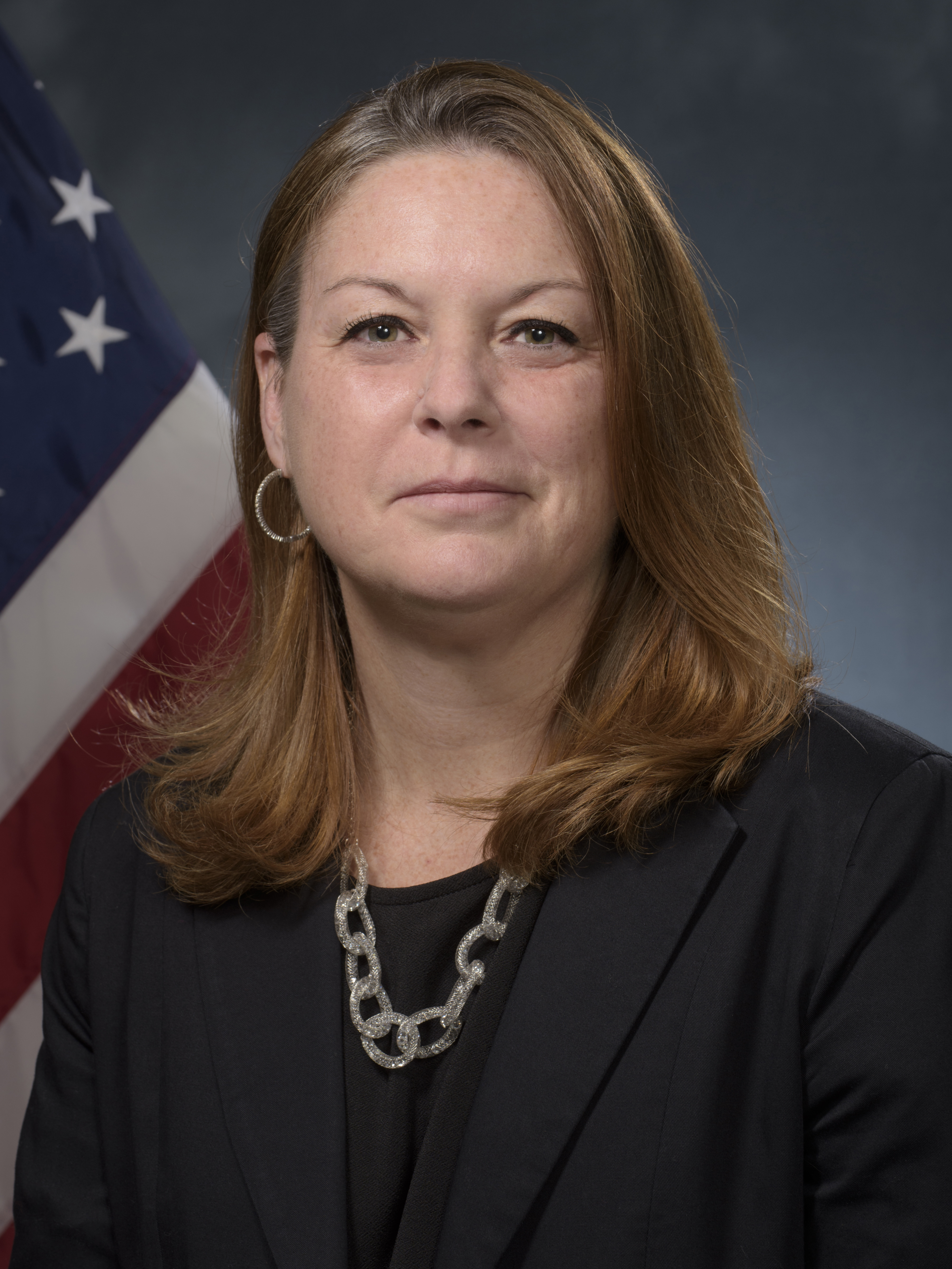
- Official portrait, 2018

27th Director of the United States Secret Service
- In office September 17, 2022 – July 23, 2024
- President: Joe Biden
- Deputy: Ronald L. Rowe Jr.
- Preceded by: James M. Murray
- Succeeded by: Sean M. Curran

Personal details
- Born: Kimberly Ann Cheatle; 1970/1971 (age 55–56) Hinsdale, Illinois, U.S.
- Education: Eastern Illinois University (BA)
- Awards: Presidential Rank Award (2021)

Kimberly Ann Cheatle (born 1970/1971) is an American former law enforcement officer who served as the 27th director of the United States Secret Service from 2022 until 2024. After serving in the Secret Service from 1995 to 2019, she worked as senior director of global security at PepsiCo from 2019 to 2022. Appointed director of the Secret Service by President Joe Biden, she assumed the office on 17 September 2022, becoming the second woman to hold the position.

Following the attempted assassination of Donald Trump at a campaign rally on July 13, 2024, the Secret Service was widely criticized over security lapses. On July 22, Cheatle testified before the United States House Committee on Oversight and Accountability, where she faced bipartisan calls for her resignation. She resigned on July 23 and was succeeded by acting director Ronald L. Rowe Jr.

== Early life and education ==
Cheatle was born in Hinsdale, Illinois, and grew up in Danville, Illinois. She completed her undergraduate studies at Eastern Illinois University with a major in sociology and a concentration in criminal justice.

== Career ==
Cheatle joined the United States Secret Service in 1995. She was involved in the evacuation of Vice President of the United States Dick Cheney during the September 11 attacks and served on Joe Biden's protective detail during the Obama administration, when she was assigned to the Vice Presidential Protective Division. In 2017 and 2018, she served as deputy assistant director. She served as special-agent-in-charge in the Grand Rapids, Michigan office. She became the first woman to serve as assistant director of Protective Operations, a unit tasked with protection of the president of the United States and dignitaries.

From 2019 to 2022, Cheatle served as senior director of global security at PepsiCo.

In 2021, President Joe Biden awarded Cheatle a Presidential Rank Award for exceptional performance. In August 2022, President Biden announced the appointment of Cheatle as director of the United States Secret Service, and she assumed office on September 17, 2022. She was the second woman to hold the position. Cheatle took over the Secret Service following "a turbulent couple of months in which the agency best known for protecting presidents has faced controversies related to the Jan. 6, 2021, attack on the U.S. Capitol."

In 2023, Cheatle told CBS News the agency needed to "attract diverse candidates and give opportunities to everybody in the workforce, particularly women," outlining her goal that by 2030, thirty percent of its recruits would be female.

In April 2024, after a female agent on Vice President Kamala Harris's detail assaulted her superior officer, United States House Committee on Oversight and Accountability Chairman James Comer requested a briefing with Cheatle to address issues regarding hiring, training and disciplinary processes. The Secret Service downplayed reports of a petition circulating within the agency alleging security vulnerabilities arising from these processes. Cheatle's previous statements regarding diversity, equity, and inclusion became a frequent target for criticism by commentators after the attempted assassination of Donald Trump. Anthony Guglielmi, the Secret Service’s chief of communication, called criticism of female agents "misogynistic" and reaffirmed its belief where diversity in recruiting was "helping, not hurting, the effectiveness of its protective teams."

=== Attempted assassination of Donald Trump ===
On July 13, 2024, during the attempted assassination of Donald Trump in Butler, Pennsylvania, Cheatle was in Milwaukee, Wisconsin, where the 2024 Republican National Convention was due to commence in two days. In the wake of the shooting and criticism of her leadership, Cheatle acknowledged the failure of the Secret Service, calling it "unacceptable." However, Cheatle told ABC News that she would not resign from her position and defended herself by saying that local law enforcement had been responsible for securing the building from which the shooter launched his attack.

A week later on July 20, Congressman Brendan Boyle (D-PA) called on Cheatle to resign in the wake of the assassination attempt against Trump, making him the first congressional Democrat to do so. Earlier, House Speaker Mike Johnson called on Cheatle to resign, and Senate Minority Leader Mitch McConnell called for new leadership at the agency on the same day.

On July 22, Cheatle testified before the United States House Committee on Oversight and Accountability about the assassination attempt. During the hearing, she acknowledged it was "the most significant operational failure at the Secret Service in decades" and faced a bipartisan chorus of lawmakers calling for her to resign. Her testimony was condemned by House members of both parties for being evasive and uninformative. At one point, Cheatle's answer to a question by Marjorie Taylor Greene was so uninformative that members of the audience in the hearing room laughed at her. However, she pledged not to resign. Cheatle also declined to answer questions about whether the Secret Service had rebuffed requests for additional resources for Trump's security detail in the two years leading up to the assassination attempt; the week prior an agency spokesman denied that any such requests had been turned down.

Cheatle resigned from her position as the director of the Secret Service on July 23, 2024. Because she received ongoing threats, she was assigned her own security detail.
