= Andrew L. Drummond =

United States Secret Service chief (died 1921)

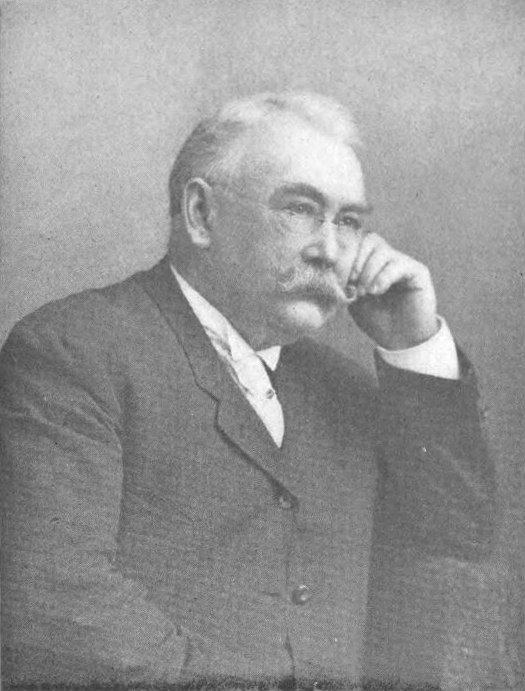

6th Chief of the United States Secret Service
- In office 1891–1894
- President: Benjamin Harrison; Grover Cleveland
- Preceded by: John S. Bell
- Succeeded by: William P. Hazen

Personal details
- Born: November 6, 1844 Peach Bottom, Pennsylvania, U.S.
- Died: February 12, 1921 (aged 76) Brooklyn, New York, U.S.
- Resting place: Calvary Cemetery

Andrew Lewis Drummond (1844–1921) was chief of the United States Secret Service from 1891 to 1894.

== Biography ==
Drummond was born in Peach Bottom, Pennsylvania on November 6, 1844. He joined the United States Secret Service in 1871. Drummond was known for his investigation into the original Ku Klux Klan. In 1894, he resigned from the Secret Service and went on to head a detective agency in New York.

In 1909, Drummond published the book True Detective Stories. The book contained narratives of criminal cases he had worked on during his career, many of which involved counterfeiting.

He died at his home in Brooklyn on February 12, 1921, and was buried at Calvary Cemetery in Queens.
