= John S. Bell (Secret Service) =

Second chief of United States Secret Service

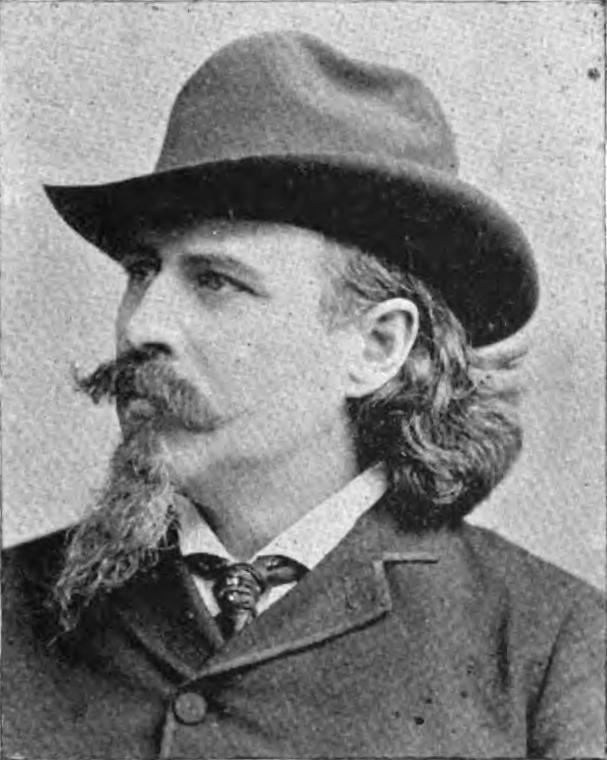

5th Chief of the United States Secret Service
- In office January 21, 1888 – 1890
- President: Grover Cleveland; Benjamin Harrison
- Preceded by: James Brooks
- Succeeded by: Andrew L. Drummond

Personal details
- Born: November 23, 1844 Sparkill, New York
- Died: June 20, 1917 (aged 72) Newark, New Jersey
- Party: Democratic

John S. Bell (November 23, 1844 – June 20, 1917) was chief of the United States Secret Service from 1888 to 1890. Prior to his appointment, Bell was Chief of the Newark Police Department. As Chief of the Secret Service, Bell was given the title and rank of Colonel in charge of the United States Secret Service. During his tenure, Bell persistently requested increased funding and more manpower from the Secretary of the Treasury, William Windom, to assist in the suppression of counterfeiting, which was a growing problem. Despite the validity of his concerns, Bell was asked to resign by Windom, and did so in 1890. Following his departure from the Secret Service, Bell re-entered the ice business in New Jersey, where he died in 1917. Bell was a close friend of Buffalo Bill Cody, and like Cody, Bell was known by his contemporaries for his Wild West fashion and long hair.
