= 1994 White House shooting =

Assassination attempt on President Bill Clinton, 1994

- The north façade of the White House, viewed from Pennsylvania Avenue, where Duran opened fire.

- 1994 White House shooting (Central Washington, D.C.)
- Location: 38°53′32″N 77°02′12″W; White House, Washington D.C., US
- Date: October 29, 1994; 32 years ago c. 2:55 p.m. (EDT; UTC−04:00)
- Target: Bill Clinton
- Attack type: Attempted assassination
- Weapons: Chinese Type 56 semi-automatic carbine; Mossberg .410-bore shotgun (unused, left in car)
- Deaths: 0
- Injuries: 0
- Perpetrator: Francisco Martin Duran
- Defenders: Harry Michael Rakosky Jr.; Robert Edward Haines; Kenneth Alan Davis

On Saturday, October 29, 1994, 26-year-old Francisco Martin Duran fired multiple shots at the White House using a semi-automatic rifle, hitting the mansion several times before he was subdued by bystanders and arrested. President Bill Clinton was home at the time but was not injured. First Lady Hillary Clinton and the couple's daughter Chelsea Clinton were not at the residence at the time of the attack. No one was injured.

Duran was convicted in 1995 of attempting to assassinate the president and was sentenced to 40 years in prison. As of 2026, the Federal Bureau of Prisons projected his release date to be 2029. The incident was the first shooting to occur at the White House in over 150 years and remained the most recent attack on the residence until the 2011 White House shooting.

== Background ==
=== Perpetrator ===
Francisco Martin Duran (/dəˈræn/; born September 8, 1968) was born in Barelas, an inner-city neighborhood of Albuquerque, New Mexico, to Celia Duran. (1932–2011) He had six half-brothers, all born to different fathers, most of whom moved in and out of his life. Duran never knew his biological father. His mother was a cleaning lady who received food stamps and other government assistance.

In February 1986, Duran was arrested at 17 and charged with attempted theft after taking a Bobcat front-end loader from a construction site and going for a joyride with another boy. The judge made a deal with him that he would drop the charges if he enlisted in the United States Army. Duran quickly accepted the judge's offer, and his mother gave her consent as he was a minor. Following his graduation from Albuquerque High School in May 1986, he began basic training. Duran was selected as a medical specialist. His first tour of duty was with the 25th Light Infantry Division in Hawaii. He was an unremarkable soldier. During this tour he fell in love and had a son; he was married shortly after.

On August 9, 1990, Duran met a group of Army friends at a bowling alley. By late in the evening, everyone, including Duran, were drunk. An argument ensued between the soldiers and some civilian men and women who objected to their boisterous behavior. Tempers escalated and they were ordered out of the bowling alley. As the crowd came out into the parking lot, Duran got into his car and was attempting to leave, but the group of hostile civilians began to block his vehicle. He got out of his car and confronted one of them, before getting back in his car and driving off. After driving a short distance, He turned around and began driving back towards to the parking lot. Duran then suddenly swerved his vehicle and accelerated directly into the crowd of civilians who were still gathered in front of the bowling alley, hitting and injuring a woman and scattering the rest before speeding away. He was stopped shortly after by military police, dragged out of his car and arrested.

Duran was charged with drunk driving, aggravated assault, drunken and disorderly conduct, and leaving the scene of an accident. At a court-martial, he was convicted on all charges, stripped of his military rank, and sentenced to five years in prison at the United States Disciplinary Barracks in Fort Leavenworth, Kansas. While he was in prison, two of his brothers died, one of a drug overdose. His requests to attend their funerals were denied. Duran was released in 1993 after serving two and a half years.

Following his release, Duran, his wife, and their five-year-old son settled in Widefield, Colorado, where they moved into a mobile home. He found a low-paying job as an upholsterer at The Broadmoor, a resort hotel in Colorado Springs. Duran held anti-government sentiments and was reportedly influenced by conspiracy theories and extremist ideologies.

== Attempted assassination ==
Official portrait of Bill Clinton, 1993

=== Preparations ===
Duran began to purchase a number of assault weapons in mid-September of 1994. On September 13, the same day that President Bill Clinton signed a crime bill against assault weapons, Duran walked into a Colorado firearms store and tried to purchase a handgun. Following a background check that was required under the Brady law which revealed his prior felony conviction, his purchase was denied. Duran instead purchased a Chinese Type 56 semi-automatic carbine, a weapon he would not have been able to legally purchase the following day, and about 100 rounds of ammunition at the same store. Two days later, he bought a thirty-round clip and had the rifle equipped with a folding stock. Thirteen days after that, on September 28, Duran purchased a Mossberg .410-bore shotgun, and purchased more ammunition the following day. Continuing his preparations, Duran practiced at a firing range.

Duran continued to report to work through the month of September. He had shifted around $6,000 in charges from his credit card to one he had taken out in his wife's name. The charges on the card included those for the two firearms, the ammunition, a cellular phone, and a pager. When his wife, Ingrid, confronted him on the purpose of the purchases, Duran told her that he "wanted to be in the history books." She claimed that he did not elaborate any further. On September 30, he dropped Ingrid off at her workplace. He informed her that after depositing their son at a day care center, he was going to pick up some supplies for target practice. Duran then, without notifying his family or employer, begin his cross-country journey to Washington D.C. When he did not return to pick up her or their son later that afternoon, or return that evening, she was perplexed and worried, having no idea where her husband had gone. Ingrid contacted the El Paso County Sheriff's Office the following day to file a missing persons report.

On October 10, 1994, Duran purchased a thirty-round clip in Charlottesville, Virginia, and the next day bought a large overcoat in Richmond, Virginia. He checked into a hotel that same day in Richmond. The next morning, he arrived in Washington, D.C. and checked into a hotel. On October 15, Duran called Ingrid and stated that he was preparing to do something drastic and that he would be killed in the assault he was planning. He refused to tell her where he was or what he was planning. After worrying for two days, Ingrid contacted the Federal Bureau of Investigation (FBI) and reported the call and threat. As there was no reference to the president, the FBI did not forward the information to the Secret Service. Sometime after he had made the call, Duran left from downtown Washington and checked into the Embassy Suites Hotel in the Virginia suburb of Tysons Corner. While awaiting the president's return, he moved about the Washington metropolitan area, staying at various hotels in the area between the tenth and the twenty-ninth of October, including the Washington Hilton, the site of the attempted assassination of President Ronald Reagan.

Clinton returned to Washington on October 22 and spent the next two days residing with aides in the White House, preparing for an upcoming trip to the Middle East. He departed on that trip on October 24. By this time, Duran was quickly running out of money. Clinton returned to Washington D.C. on October 28, with plans being announced he would again depart on October 30 for a trip to Pennsylvania, leaving Duran's window of opportunity for Saturday, October 29, 1994.

=== Shooting ===
On the morning of Saturday, October 29, 1994, Duran arose shortly before 6:00 a.m. and checked out of the Embassy Suites Hotel in Tysons Corner, before driving to downtown Washington, and parking his 1989 Chevrolet S-10 pickup truck on 17th Street, between D and E Streets, near the White House. Recognizing the distance from the White House fence to the mansion itself was beyond the range of his shotgun, he left it in the truck, instead choosing to load the assault rifle with a thirty-round clip and folding its stock down so that it could be concealed beneath his trench coat. He slipped an extra ammo magazine into a coat pocket. Duran then walked a short distance to Pennsylvania Avenue before positioning himself on a public sidewalk just across the street from the White House.

By early afternoon, he was standing in front of the north side of the White House, wearing the long tan overcoat he had purchased earlier on his trip. As Duran stood by the north fence, he overheard two eighth-grade students on a field trip, Robert DeCamp and Brent Owens, point out a tour group consisting of four men dressed in dark suits standing near the White House on the North Lawn. One of the members of the tour group, fashion designer and Clinton fundraiser Dennis Basso, bore a strong resemblance to President Clinton. DeCamp remarked that Basso "looked like Bill Clinton," and Owens said "Yeah, it does." Almost immediately after this exchange, Duran, believing that Basso was in fact Clinton, removed the assault rifle from underneath his trench coat, extended its folding stock, and at approximately 2:55 p.m., pointed the rifle between the bars of the White House fence and began firing 7.62×39mm rounds in the direction of Basso.

Four Secret Service agents who were positioned on the north side of the White House reacted to the report of several gunshots by taking cover and attempting to move toward the source of the gunfire. After firing about twenty rounds from his original position, Duran began running east along the fence, continuing to fire in the direction of the White House as bystanders scattered in panic. Duran fired a total of 29 rounds during the incident, with five of the bullets hitting the mansion’s four-foot thick sandstone wall, and three others shattering a window and chipping the stone of the Press Briefing Room near the West Wing.

While Duran was attempting to reload his rifle with another thirty-round clip, a passerby, 34-year-old security specialist Harry Michael Rakosky Jr., grabbed him from behind and tackled him to the ground. When Duran was being tackled, he swung the rifle around and jammed it into Rakosky's abdomen. As Rakosky struggled with Duran, two other bystanders, 47-year-old former military instructor Robert Edward Haines and 24-year-old corrections officer trainee Kenneth Alan Davis, jumped in and helped to subdue the gunman. Haines held his rifle down on the sidewalk so he could not fire it, while Davis held Duran's legs to stop him from moving. Secret Service agents arrived moments later to confiscate the rifle and take him into custody. As he was being handcuffed by authorities, Duran stated, “I wish you had shot me.” Officers recovered the ammo magazine from his coat pocket loaded with thirty rounds of live ammunition.

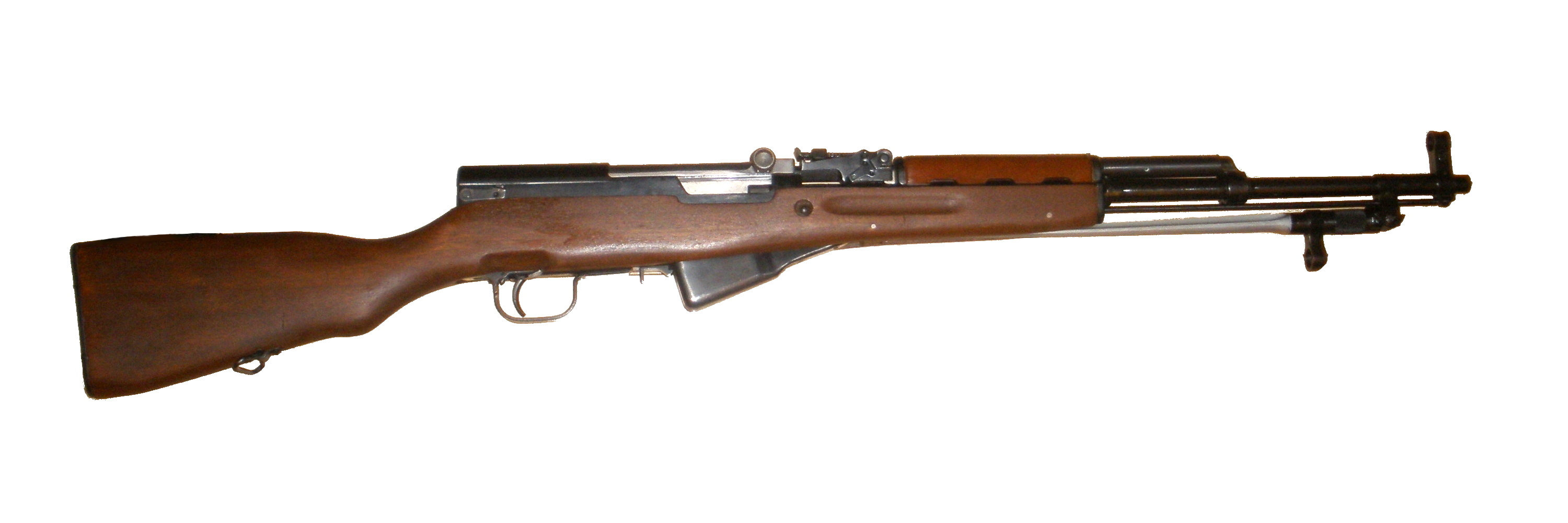
Chinese Type 56 semi-automatic carbine, the same model of firearm used by Duran in the attack.

At the time of the attack, Clinton was on the opposite side of the White House in the upstairs living quarters watching a football game. He was unaware of the attack until he was informed moments later by his Secret Service detail of what had occurred. Clinton was not in the immediate vicinity of the windows that were being targeted and as such was not harmed. First Lady Hillary Clinton and the couple's daughter Chelsea Clinton were not at the residence at the time of the shooting. No one was injured during the shooting.

The incident occurred just six weeks after Frank Eugene Corder crashed a Cessna into the south lawn of the White House, and prompted debate about closing off traffic on that area of Pennsylvania Avenue.

== Aftermath ==
=== Investigation ===
Following the incident, Duran was transported to a Secret Service holding area. Upon searching him, the Secret Service recovered a one-page, handwritten note identifying himself, his wife, and directing authorities to his vehicle, stating that it was parked near the White House. After a lookout was broadcast, approximately thirty minutes after his arrest, Duran's pickup truck was located by a K9 officer. The truck was checked for explosives and eventually searched. Authorities recovered several items from the vehicle, including his shotgun, several boxes of ammunition, and a nerve gas antidote. Several documents were also found inside, including a road atlas containing the statement "Kill the Pres!"; a picture of Clinton with a circle drawn around his head with an "X" over his face; a letter in which he had written "Can you imagine a higher moral calling than to destroy someone's dreams with one bullet?"; a last will and testament; and anti-government literature.

After searching Duran's home and office in Colorado, authorities found a Sears business card on which he had written on the back "kill all government offices [sic] and department heads," and other pieces of anti-government literature.

=== Legal proceedings ===
Duran was arrested and charged with attempted murder, as well as multiple counts of assault with a deadly weapon. As Duran had previously been convicted of a felony (the Army vehicle ramming incident in 1990), he was not meant to own a firearm and was thus also charged with illegal possession of a firearm by a convicted felon. Duran pleaded not guilty by reason of insanity. The prosecution argued that Duran was fully aware of the nature of his actions and had deliberately attempted to kill Clinton. Previously, John Hinckley Jr., who attempted to assassinate Ronald Reagan, had been found not guilty by reason of insanity and spared a harsh punishment. Nonetheless, the jury found Duran guilty and he was sentenced to 40 years in prison by U.S. District Court Judge Charles Robert Richey.

As of 2026, Duran is serving his sentence at the medium-security Federal Correctional Institution, Three Rivers. At that time, the Federal Bureau of Prisons projected his release date to be February 3, 2029.
