= Julia Pierson =

American law enforcement official

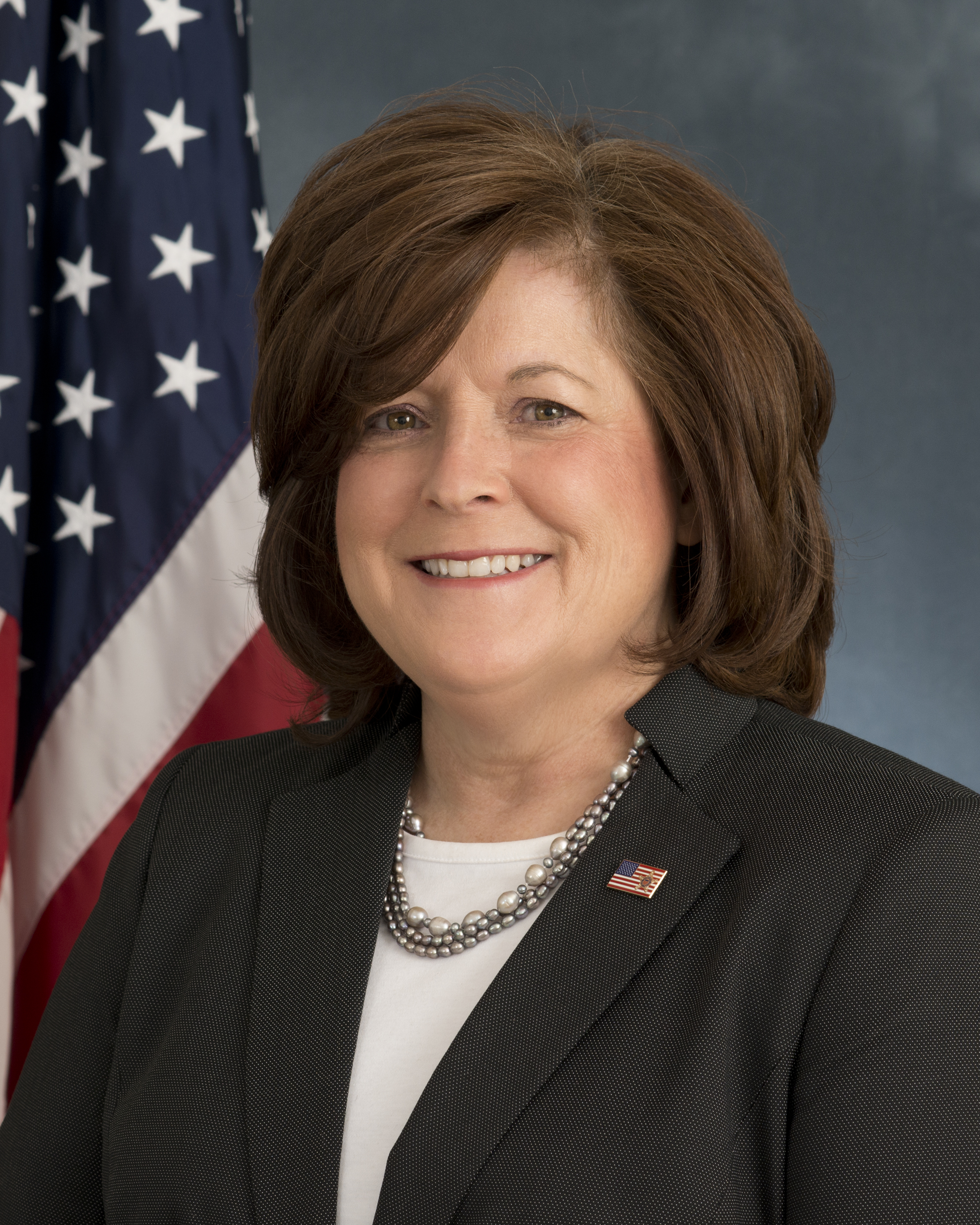

23rd Director of the United States Secret Service
- In office March 27, 2013 – October 1, 2014
- President: Barack Obama
- Deputy: A. T. Smith
- Preceded by: Mark Sullivan
- Succeeded by: Joseph Clancy

Personal details
- Born: July 21, 1959 (age 67) Orlando, Florida, U.S.
- Education: University of Central Florida (BCJ)

Julia Ann Pierson (born July 21, 1959) is an American former law enforcement official. On March 27, 2013, President Barack Obama appointed her as the 23rd Director of the United States Secret Service. Pierson was the first female director of the agency. Amid a series of security lapses involving the Secret Service, she resigned the position on October 1, 2014.

== Early life and education ==
Pierson is a native of Orlando, Florida. While in high school, she worked at Walt Disney World as a parking lot attendant, watercraft attendant, and in costume in Disney parades.

She was an Explorer in the Learning for Life program of the Boy Scouts of America in a post specializing in law enforcement chartered to the Orlando Police Department. She was the 1978 National Law Enforcement Exploring Youth Representative, leading the Law Enforcement Exploring division, and was selected as the National Law Enforcement Exploring chair.

She attended the University of Central Florida, graduating in 1980 with a bachelor's degree in criminal justice.

== Career ==
Following graduation, Pierson served three years in the Orlando Police Department (OPD), patrolling the northeastern section of Orlando. She was one of the first female OPD officers assigned to a beat. She joined the United States Secret Service in 1983 as a special agent. She served in the Miami Field Office from 1983 to 1985, and the Orlando Field Office from 1985 to 1988. From 1988 to 2000, she served on the presidential protective details (PPDs) of Presidents George H. W. Bush, Bill Clinton, and George W. Bush. Between 2000 and 2001, Pierson held the position of special agent in charge of the Office of Protective Operations, and then as deputy assistant director of the Office of Administration from 2001 to 2005. From 2005 to 2006 she served as deputy assistant director of the Office of Protective Operations. From 2006 to 2008 Pierson served as assistant director of the Office of Human Resources and Training. In 2008 Pierson received the Presidential Meritorious Executive Rank Award. From 2008 to her appointment as director in 2013, Pierson served as the chief of staff to the director.

Pierson was appointed by President Barack Obama on March 27, 2013, and became the first woman to head the agency. Pierson was already the agency's highest-ranking woman before being promoted to director. She was tasked with improving the image of the Secret Service, following the Summit of the Americas prostitution scandal. On September 30, 2014, while testifying at a United States House of Representatives hearing, Pierson faced Congressional criticism over the 2014 White House intrusion.

Approximately one week prior to the White House intrusion, there had been another security breach when it was discovered that an armed security guard, who had not been cleared by the Secret Services' advance team, rode in the same elevator as President Obama during a visit to Atlanta. It is believed that while Director Pierson was aware of this breach, she had not informed Ed Donovan, the agency's Chief Spokesperson nor Jane Murphy, the assistant director for government and public affairs. On October 1, 2014, Secretary of Homeland Security Jeh Johnson accepted her resignation as director.
