= Sean M. Curran =

American law enforcement officer (born 1976 or 1977)

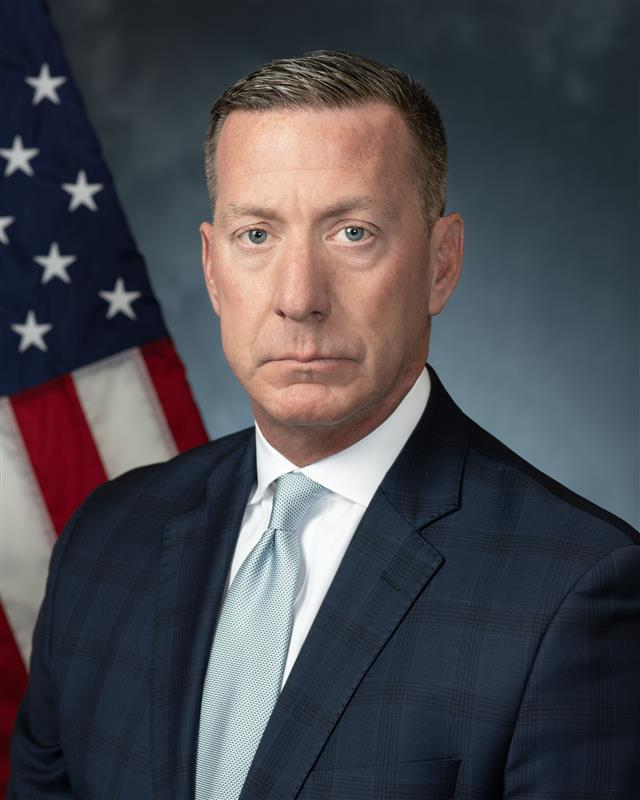
- Official portrait, 2025

28th Director of the United States Secret Service
- Incumbent
- Assumed office January 22, 2025
- President: Donald Trump
- Deputy: Matthew C. Quinn; Mark. P. Ryan
- Preceded by: Kimberly Cheatle

Personal details
- Born: Sean Michael Curran; 1976 (age 49–50) New Jersey, U.S.
- Education: Stockton University (BA); Seton Hall University (MA)

Sean Michael Curran (born 1976) is an American law enforcement officer who has served as the director of the United States Secret Service since 2025.

Curran joined the United States Secret Service as a special agent in its Newark field office in 2001. He served on President Barack Obama's security detail and worked within the Secret Service's dignitary-protection division. In 2018, Curran became the assistant special agent-in-charge of the presidential-protective division. He was appointed the agent-in-charge of former president Donald Trump's security detail in 2021. Curran was present after a would-be assassin attempted to kill Trump in July 2024. Curran became the deputy special agent-in-charge of the Presidential Protective Detail in December.

In January 2025, Trump appointed Curran as the director of the Secret Service.

== Early life and education ==
Sean Michael Curran was born in 1976. Curran was raised in New Jersey. He attended Stockton University, where he graduated with a bachelor's degree in political science. He also attended Seton Hall University, graduating with a master's degree in human resources training and development.

== Career ==
In September 2001, Curran joined the United States Secret Service as a special agent in its Newark field office. He was recognized as the Secret Service's special agent of the year in 2007. Curran was added to President Barack Obama's security detail in 2008. In 2014, he was transferred to the Secret Service's dignitary-protection division. Curran was appointed as the assistant to the special agent in charge of the Secret Service's Washington field office in 2016. His work included managing the Secret Service's response to events leading up to the 2016 presidential election.

In President Donald Trump's first term, Curran became a deputy supervisor on his detail. In 2018, he was appointed the assistant special agent-in-charge of the presidential-protective division. Curran's work included managing logistics for overseas visits. He was appointed the agent-in-charge of Trump's security detail in 2021. Curran had a personal relationship with Trump. He encouraged the Secret Service to allocate additional resources towards protecting Trump; according to CBS News, Curran was forced to develop Trump's detail independently as the Secret Service's leadership focused on protecting President Joe Biden. Curran was present with Trump after a would-be assassin attempted to kill Trump in Butler, Pennsylvania, in July 2024. Curran became the deputy special agent-in-charge of the Presidential Protective Detail in December.

== Director of the U.s. Secret Service (2025–present) ==
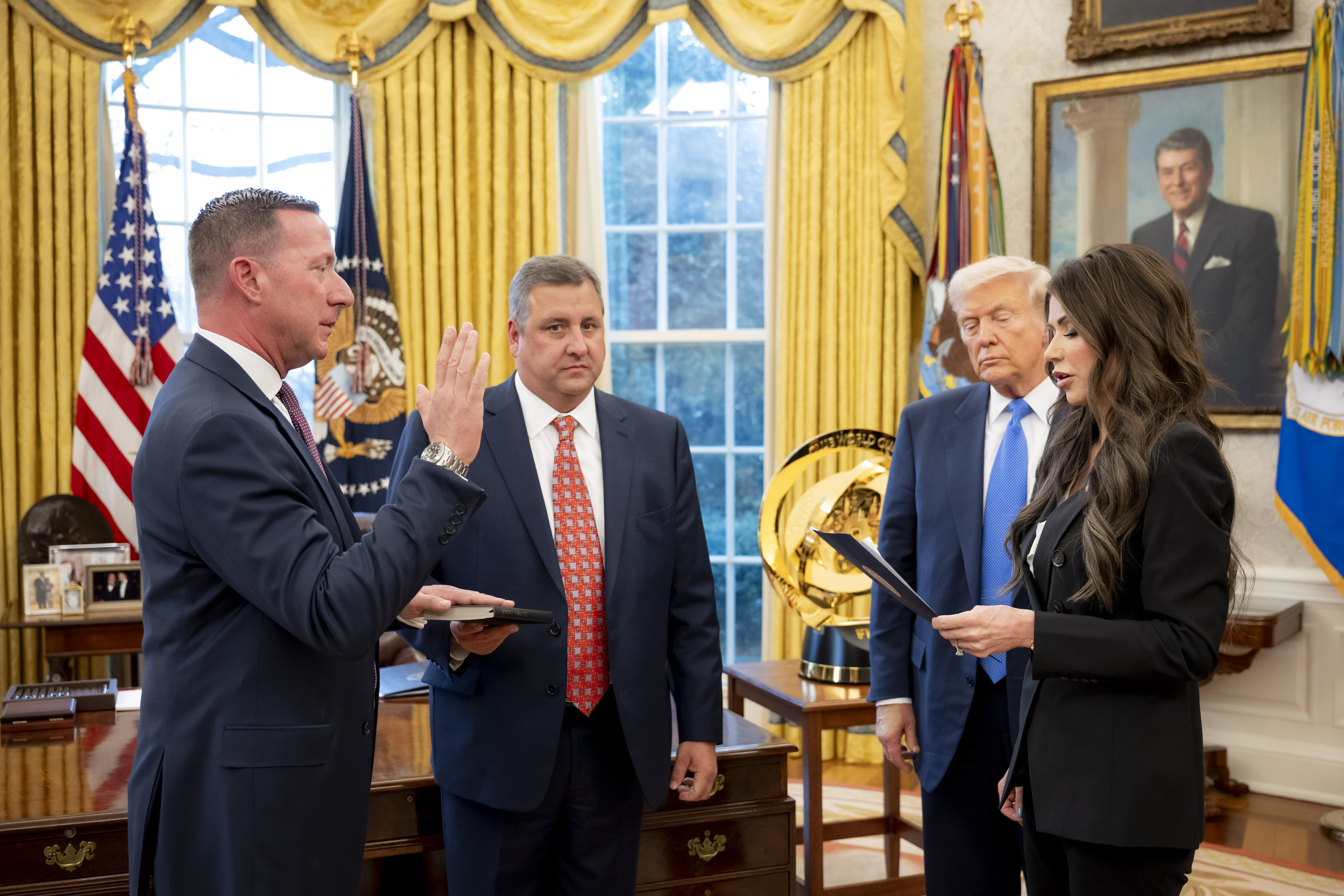
Curran is ceremoniously sworn in by Secretary of Homeland Security Kristi Noem in March 2025.

In November 2024, CNN reported that Curran was among several candidates being considered to serve as Donald Trump's director of the Secret Service. On January 22, 2025, Trump appointed Curran to the position. Trump's decision forwent a recommendation from an independent review panel installed after Trump's attempted assassination that recommended a director who was not in the Secret Service. Curran's tenure occurred as the Secret Service faced calls for reform from Congress amid staffing and logistical issues at the agency.

As director of the Secret Service, Curran sought to encourage recruitment and requested larger funding for the Secret Service. He reassigned several officials and installed other individuals to leadership positions, including the lawyer Richard Giuditta, whom he appointed as a legal advisor. Curran opposed a gender quota imposed by former Director Kimberly Cheatle. The Secret Service was the only law enforcement agency to adhere to Elon Musk's memorandum mandating federal workers justify their jobs. Despite Musk's efforts to institute mass layoffs across the federal government, the Secret Service began an advertising campaign to bring in agents, including a commercial for Super Bowl LIX.
