= Director of the United States Secret Service =

- Emblem of the Secret Service

- Flag of the Secret Service

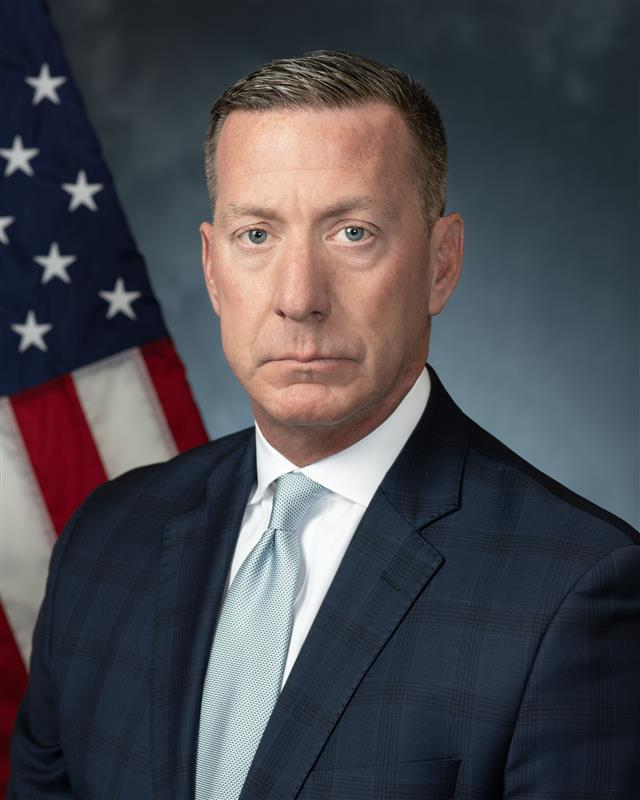
- Incumbent; Sean M. Curran since January 22, 2025
- United States Secret Service
- Reports to: Secretary of Homeland Security
- Seat: Washington, D.C.
- Appointer: President of the United States
- Term length: At the pleasure of the president
- Formation: July 5, 1865 (161 years ago)
- First holder: William P. Wood (as chief)
- Deputy: Mark. P. Ryan
- Website: www.secretservice.gov

The director of the United States Secret Service is the head of the United States Secret Service, and is responsible for the day-to-day operations.

The Secret Service is a federal law enforcement agency that is part of the United States Department of Homeland Security. The service is mandated by the U.S. Congress to carry out a unique dual mission: safeguarding the financial and critical infrastructure of the United States, and protecting the nation's leaders.

The director is appointed by, and serves at the pleasure of, the president of the United States, and is not subject to Senate confirmation. The director reports to the secretary of homeland security, and operates with the general directions thereof. Prior to March 1, 2003, the Secret Service was a part of the United States Department of the Treasury.

== History ==
President Abraham Lincoln signed legislation creating the Secret Service on April 14, 1865, the day of his assassination. It was commissioned on July 5, 1865, in Washington, D.C., as the "Secret Service Division" of the Department of the Treasury. After being appointed by President Andrew Johnson, William P. Wood was sworn in as the first chief of the Secret Service on July 5, 1865, by Secretary of the Treasury Hugh McCulloch.

When the Secret Service was established, its head was called the chief of the Secret Service. In 1965, the title was changed to the director of the Secret Service, four years into the term of James Joseph Rowley (1961–1973). The longest-serving head of the Secret Service was William H. Moran, who served under five presidents from 1917 to 1936.

On March 27, 2013, President Barack Obama appointed Julia Pierson to be the twenty-third director of the Secret Service. She became the first female director of the agency. On October 1, 2014, the Secret Service leadership changed to Director Joseph Clancy, a retired agent who formerly led the Presidential Protective Division. On March 4, 2017, Director Joseph Clancy retired, leaving the position vacant until a replacement was nominated by President Donald Trump. Meanwhile, William J. Callahan served as acting director of the United States Secret Service from March 4, 2017, to April 25, 2017. Randolph Alles, former acting deputy commissioner of the U.S. Customs and Border Protection, was appointed director by Trump.

== List of chiefs and directors ==
No.	Picture	Name	Took office	Left office	Time in office	President appointed by
1	William P. Wood	William P. Wood (1820–1903)	July 5, 1865	1869	3–4 years	Andrew Johnson
2	Hiram C. Whitley	Hiram C. Whitley (1834–1919)	1869	1874	4–5 years	Ulysses S. Grant
3	Elmer Washburn	Elmer Washburn (1839–1897)	1874	1876	1–2 years	Ulysses S. Grant
4	James Brooks	James Brooks (1824–1895)	1876	1888	11–12 years	Rutherford B. Hayes
5	John S. Bell	John S. Bell (1844–1917)	1888	1890	1–2 years	Grover Cleveland
6	Andrew L. Drummond	Andrew L. Drummond (1845–1921)	1891	1894	2–3 years	Benjamin Harrison
7	William P. Hazen	William P. Hazen (1840–1923)	1894	1898	3–4 years	Grover Cleveland
8	John Wilkie	John Wilkie (1860–1934)	1898	1911	12–13 years	William McKinley
9	William J. Flynn	William J. Flynn (1867–1928)	1912	1917	4–5 years	William Howard Taft
10	William H. Moran	William H. Moran (1862–1946)	1917	1936	18–19 years	Woodrow Wilson
11	Frank J. Wilson	Frank J. Wilson (1887–1970)	1937	1946	8–9 years	Franklin D. Roosevelt
12	James J. Maloney	James J. Maloney (1896–1959)	1946	1948	1–2 years	Harry Truman
13	U. E. Baughman	U. E. Baughman (1905–1978)	November 29, 1948	August 31, 1961	12 years	Harry Truman
14	James Joseph Rowley	James Joseph Rowley (1908–1992)	September 1, 1961	October 1973	12 years	John F. Kennedy
15	H. Stuart Knight	H. Stuart Knight (1921–2009)	November 7, 1973	November 30, 1981	8 years	Richard Nixon
16	John R. Simpson	John R. Simpson (1932–2017)	1981	1992	10–11 years	Ronald Reagan
17	John Magaw	John Magaw (born 1935)	1992	December 7, 1993	1 year	George H. W. Bush
18	Eljay B. Bowron	Eljay B. Bowron (born 1951)	December 7, 1993	April 2, 1997	3 years	Bill Clinton
19	Lewis C. Merletti	Lewis C. Merletti (born 1948)	June 6, 1997	March 3, 1999	1 year	Bill Clinton
20	Brian L. Stafford	Brian L. Stafford (born c. 1959)	March 4, 1999	January 24, 2003	3 years	Bill Clinton
21	W. Ralph Basham	W. Ralph Basham (born 1943)	January 27, 2003	May 30, 2006	3 years	George W. Bush
22	Mark J. Sullivan	Mark J. Sullivan (born c.1955)	May 31, 2006	March 27, 2013	6 years	George W. Bush
23	Julia Pierson	Julia Pierson (born 1959)	March 27, 2013	October 1, 2014	1 year	Barack Obama
24	Joseph Clancy	Joseph Clancy (born 1955)	October 1, 2014	March 4, 2017	2 years	Barack Obama
–	William J. Callahan	William J. Callahan; Acting	March 4, 2017	April 25, 2017	52 days	Donald Trump
25	Randolph Alles	Randolph Alles (born 1954)	April 25, 2017	May 1, 2019	2 years	Donald Trump
26	James M. Murray	James M. Murray (born c. 1968)	May 1, 2019	September 17, 2022	3 years	Donald Trump
27	Kimberly Cheatle	Kimberly Cheatle (born 1972)	September 17, 2022	July 23, 2024	1 year	Joe Biden
–	Ronald L. Rowe Jr.	Ronald L. Rowe Jr. (born 1971); Acting	July 23, 2024	January 22, 2025	183 days	Joe Biden
28	Sean M. Curran	Sean M. Curran (born 1976)	January 22, 2025	present	1 year, 296 days	Donald Trump

== See also ==
- Chief, IRS Criminal Investigation
- Director of the Central Intelligence Agency
- Director of the Federal Bureau of Investigation
- Director of the United States Marshals Service
- Federal law enforcement in the United States
