= List of White House security incidents =

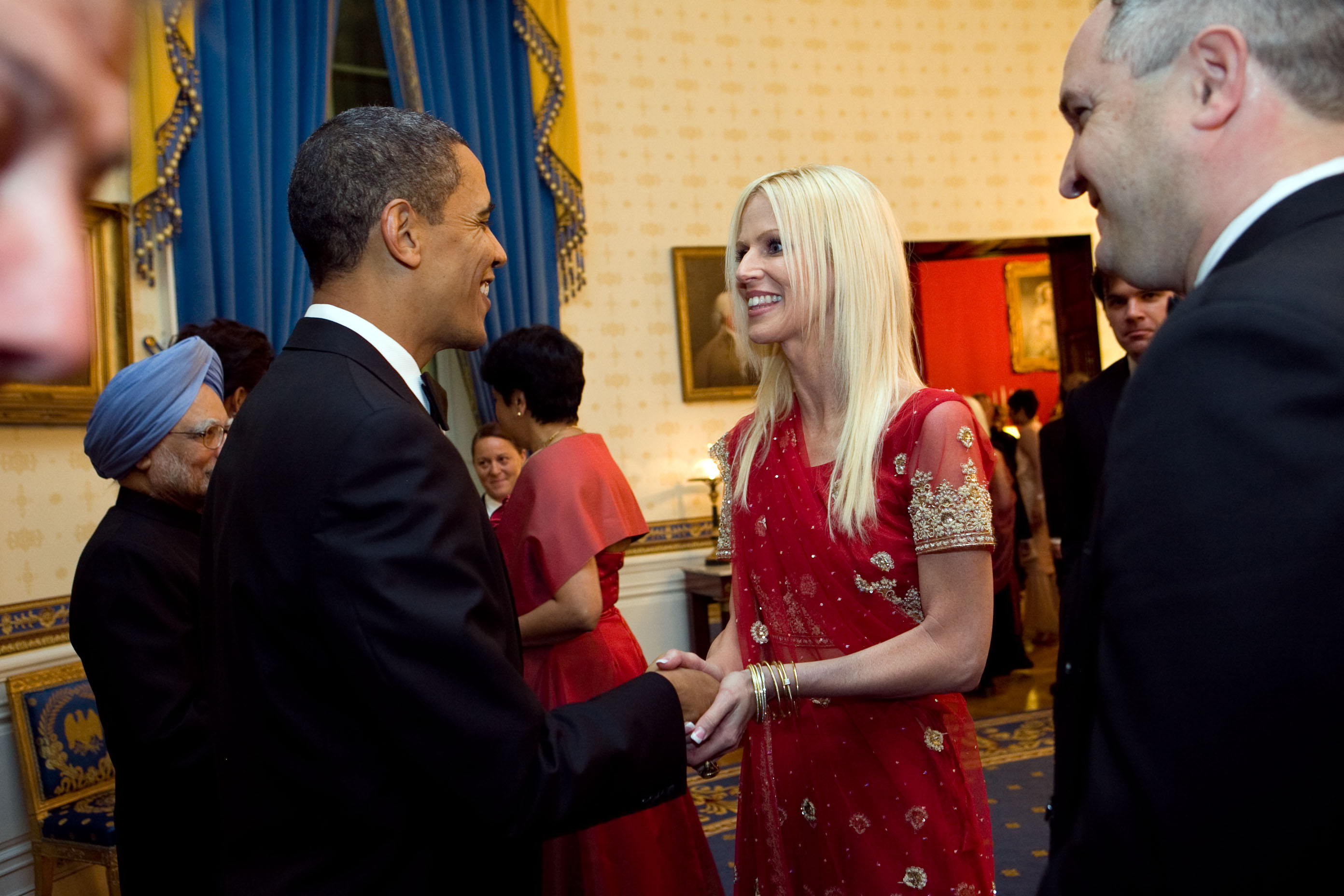
President Barack Obama greeting the Salahis in the Blue Room of the White House in November 2009. Their group had turned up uninvited and bypassed security to enter a state dinner.

Extensive measures are used to protect the White House as the official residence (Executive Residence) and office space (West Wing) of the president of the United States, and grounds. Security is primarily provided by the United States Secret Service. Despite security measures (such as a fence), there have been some people who have still managed to gain unauthorized access to the White House.

Many of the intruders were "pranksters or harmless people with mental illnesses"; however, some have entered with the intention of harming people.

== History ==
Until the late 19th century, the White House maintained an open door policy with the public having access to the corridors and lobbies of the building. Lobbyists for example could wait in the hallways of the building to petition the president. This became a significant problem by the time of the Lincoln administration, which saw the building regularly filled with people "on all conceivable errands, for all imaginable purposes." Some would gain access by climbing through windows. While Lincoln was, to begin with, adamant about the importance of speaking to regular people, it grew excessive and the White House began to restrict visiting hours for the public to a twice weekly slot. Lincoln had the layout of the building adjusted so he could go for meals without navigating the public hallways. The general open-door policy remained until around the time of the Cleveland administration in the 1880s, and the grounds themselves were open until the Coolidge administration in the 1920s. After World War II, public access to the White House grounds became increasingly restricted, with the visitor office providing scheduled tours to a limited area of the building.

Various barriers to prevent unwanted access to the White House have existed since the time of Thomas Jefferson, who had a wooden barrier constructed in the early 19th century. An iron fence was constructed in 1819, and portions of this early barrier still exist. During the mid-1990s, the fence was expanded by one block to move traffic farther from the White House to prevent damage from any car bomb. Since the September 11 attacks, the restricted airspace above the White House has been expanded and better enforced. Temporary barriers are also regularly installed during inaugurations. During the George Floyd protests and 2020 elections, a new temporary fence was installed, with concrete barriers to prevent vehicles from ramming through. The fence was 13 feet (4.0 m) tall, twice the height of the previous.

== Breaches ==
=== Into the White House ===
Note that the White House maintained a broadly open door policy until the 1880s.

- August 24, 1814 – During the War of 1812, the British Army raided and set fire to the White House, along with the Capitol and many other Washington, D.C. structures. The reconstruction took until 1817.
- 1891 – A man climbed onto the South Portico and accessed the Red Room. He was restrained by guards, aided by Benjamin Harrison.
- c.1901–1909 – A man in a top hat informed security that he had a meeting with the president, and was invited into the Red Room. After a few minutes of conversation, Theodore Roosevelt instructed the Secret Service to "Get this crank out of here". He was searched and found to be carrying a pistol.
- April 13, 1912 – Michael Winter was arrested after he forced his way into the White House to see William Howard Taft.
- c.1929–1933 – An elderly Iowan tourist with a briefcase walked past security unchallenged. "...he made himself at home, wandering quietly from room to room examining the pictures and furnishings with lively interest." He was eventually confronted and searched, the briefcase simply containing tourist books and maps.
- c.1929–1933 – During a dinner between Herbert Hoover and Louis B. Mayer, a stranger walked in from the street past security and demanded an appointment with the president. He was pushed down by a butler.
- c.1940–1945 – "For a lark", a man snuck past security to enter the White House. The lights were out as Franklin D. Roosevelt and his family were watching a movie. After the film ended, he got the president's autograph before being escorted from the premises. James Roosevelt's account of the incident was described in Margaret Truman's book The President's House.
- January 20, 1985 – Robert Latta gained access to the White House by following the 33 members of the Marine Band past security. While carrying an overnight bag, he was able to wander around the Executive Residence for 14 minutes before being apprehended by Secret Service agents.
- November 24, 2009 – Carlos Allen, Michaele Salahi, and Tareq Salahi showed up uninvited to a state dinner for then Indian Prime Minister Manmohan Singh.
- September 19, 2014 – Omar Gonzalez jumped the fence from the Pennsylvania Avenue side of the White House and entered through the North Portico doors. Upon entering he overpowered a Secret Service officer and ran through most of the main floor before he was tackled by a counter-assault agent.
- September 20, 2020 – Actress Maria Bakalova, portraying her character Tutar during filming for Borat Subsequent Moviefilm, gained access to the White House by shadowing OAN journalist Chanel Rion. She attended a speech given by Donald Trump and was able to speak with Donald Trump Jr. The footage from the incident was not used in the film, but shared online later.

=== Onto the grounds ===
Note that the grounds were usually open to the public until the 1920s.

- December 25, 1973 – Two protesters were arrested for climbing the black iron fence around the White House and walking toward the mansion where Richard Nixon was having dinner with his family. The two demonstrators, Deborah Daniell and Mitchell Snyder, were charged by the Secret Service with unlawful entry. The two, according to an eyewitness, John McGuirk, “went over the fence and walked directly toward the rotunda. Mitch was grabbed right away and hauled off. Debbie knelt down and was carried off. They were trying to deliver pictures of Vietnamese children who were mutilated because of Nixon's orders.”
- February 17, 1974 – Robert K. Preston hovered a stolen Bell UH-1B Iroquois helicopter above the grounds and was forced to land. He ran towards the residence, but was tackled before reaching it.
- December 25, 1974 – Marshall H. Fields crashed a Chevrolet Impala through the Northwest Gate of the White House complex. He drove up to the North Portico and delayed his arrest for hours by claiming to possess explosives, though they were later discovered to be flares.
- November 26, 1975 into 1976 – Gerald B. Gainous climbed the White House fence four times over a period of a year during the Ford administration. At one point he gained access to the grounds where he approached Susan Ford, the daughter of the president, before being arrested.
- July 25, 1976 – Chester Plummer scaled the White House fence, armed with a piece of pipe. While advancing towards the White House, he was ordered to stop by a Secret Service officer. After ignoring the order, he was shot by a rookie officer, and died later in the hospital from his wounds; he was the first known shooting victim on White House grounds.
- October 4, 1978 – Anthony Henry, dressed in a white karate outfit, made his way onto the White House lawn armed with knives and was arrested.
- August 21, 1986 – Rosita Bourbon scaled the northeast fence of the White House with a makeshift ladder and was arrested shortly afterwards.
- November 21, 1987 – Mike Davis, an unarmed man, scaled a White House fence and made it to near the foot of a stairway that leads to the West Wing where President Ronald Reagan's office was before being arrested.
- September 12, 1994 – Frank Eugene Corder crashed a stolen Cessna 150 onto the South Lawn of the White House, apparently trying to hit the building. He was the only person killed in the incident.
- May 24, 1995 – Leland William Modjeski, wearing a business suit and carrying an unloaded .38-caliber revolver, was shot on the White House grounds after scaling the fence. Authorities doubted that he intended to harm the president and he appeared to have psychiatric problems.
- December 4, 2005 – Shawn A. Cox, of Mammoth Spring, Arkansas, was immediately captured by Secret Service agents after scaling the White House fence. Cox believed that Chelsea Clinton still lived at the White House "and that he was destined to marry her". Cox was sent to St. Elizabeth's psychiatric hospital; a court-ordered psychiatric report found that he was "grossly psychotic and manic".
- February–April 2006 – Brian Lee Patterson jumped the White House fence a total of four times.
- October 13, 2006 – Alexis Janicki, 24, of Independence, Missouri, an Iraq War veteran suffering from post-traumatic stress disorder, was arrested after climbing over the fence while in possession of marijuana.
- March 16, 2007 – Catalino Lucas Diaz scaled the fence with a package and threatened officers that he had a bomb. Catalino was arrested after determining that he had no dangerous weapon.
- June 9, 2009 – Pamela Morgan jumped the fence onto the northeast corner of the grounds while carrying a backpack. Morgan was arrested immediately and her backpack later searched and found to contain nothing dangerous.
- March 30, 2014 – Unidentified male, caught and arrested after climbing over the fence.
- August 7, 2014 – An unknown toddler squeezed through the fence, and was returned to his parents.
- September 11, 2014 – Jeffrey Grossman, 26, of Rensselaer, New York, scaled the fence and entered the North Lawn while carrying a Pikachu doll and wearing a Pikachu hat; he was apprehended by Secret Service agents. Grossman did not intend to inflict harm; he suffered from schizophrenia. After being arrested, he was taken to George Washington University Hospital for mental health observation.
- October 22, 2014 – Dominic Adesanya, formerly of Bel Air, Maryland, jumped the fence onto the north lawn and was quickly taken down by two security dogs while punching and kicking them before being arrested by the Secret Service. He was later ordered by a judge to a mental health facility. Adesanya, who had twice jumped the White House fence in July 2014, pleaded guilty in April 2015 to entering or remaining in a restricted building or grounds and was sentenced in July 2015 to time served and one year of supervised release. Adesanya's lawyer said that he suffered from schizophrenia.
- November 26, 2015 – Joseph Anthony Caputo, 22, of Stamford, Connecticut, was arrested by Secret Service agents almost immediately after jumping over a White House fence as the first family was inside celebrating Thanksgiving. Caputo had left a suicide note and will and apparently had intended to die. In a plea agreement with prosecutors, Caputo pleaded guilty to one federal misdemeanor count of illegal entry of restricted grounds and was sentenced to three years' probation with various conditions.
- March 10, 2017 – A man carrying a backpack, later identified as Jonathan Tuan Tran, 26, of Milpitas, California, was arrested after jumping the White House fence, coming within steps of the mansion. Court papers charged Tran with "entering or remaining in restricted grounds while using or carrying a dangerous weapon" and stated that he had two cans of mace in his possession at the time of the incident.
- October 17, 2017 – Curtis Combs, 36, of Somerset, Kentucky, jumped a concrete barrier on the outer perimeter of the south grounds of the White House complex and was quickly arrested.
- November 19, 2017 – Victor Merswin, 24, of Stafford, Virginia, jumped the bike rack and was in the process of climbing over the first security fence when he was captured and arrested by Secret Service officers.
- April 18, 2023 – A toddler squeezed through the fence onto the grounds, and was carried back to his parents by a Secret Service officer.

=== Into restricted airspace ===
- May 12, 2005 – A student pilot flying a small Cessna 150 violated airspace restrictions, prompting mass evacuations throughout the White House and Capitol. Afterwards, two F-16 fighter jets and a Black Hawk helicopter made the plane land at a small airport nearby.
- August 25, 2009 – A student pilot accidentally violated restricted airspace and was escorted to a nearby airport by a helicopter.
- November 26, 2019 – The White House was placed on lockdown for 30 minutes after a small aircraft intruded on restricted airspace. Fighter jets were scrambled, before it was determined that the aircraft was not hostile.
- June 4, 2023 – A privately operated aircraft carrying three passengers with an unresponsive pilot flew through restricted airspace at an altitude of 34,000 feet. Fighter jets were scrambled to intercept the plane, but the plane passed through the airspace before crashing into the side of a mountain in Virginia.

=== Non-trespassing incidents ===
- February 22, 1974 – Samuel Byck, planned to hijack a plane and fly it into the White House in an assassination attempt. He was wounded by two rounds that penetrated the aircraft door's window. He committed suicide by shooting himself in the head before police could enter the aircraft.
- December 1, 1976 – Steven B. Williams tried unsuccessfully to crash his truck through the now reinforced steel gates (strengthened after the Marshall H. Fields's incident) and was arrested.
- March 3, 1984 – David Mahonski, after previously being warned to stay away from the White House for making threats against the president, was noticed in front of the south grounds of the White House by security agents who then approached him. He pulled a sawed-off shotgun from beneath his coat, and one of the agents shot him in the arm with a revolver. He was subsequently arrested.
- March 15, 1985 – Chester Ramsey was caught and arrested by Secret Service agents while trying to climb over the fence.
- October 29, 1994 – Francisco Martin Duran, took a semi-automatic rifle and fired 29 rounds at the White House before being tackled to the ground and arrested.
- February 8, 2001 – Robert W. Pickett, an accountant from Evansville, Indiana, who had been fired from the IRS thirteen years earlier (in 1988), fired shots outside the White House fence and was then shot in the knee and arrested by Secret Service agents. Police subsequently found a suicide letter to the Commissioner of Internal Revenue.
- November 11, 2011 – Oscar Ramiro Ortega-Hernandez was taken into custody in Indiana, Pennsylvania (near Pittsburgh, Pennsylvania) in connection with bullets fired near the White House – at least two of which impacted – on Constitution Avenue, NW (near The Ellipse and the closed Washington Monument), at least one of which was stopped by bulletproof glass, the other having hit the exterior; it is unknown whether the White House was a target or was even involved – the president and first lady were in Hawaii for the APEC Summit meeting at the time. A suspect was seen fleeing into Virginia from the 23rd Street, NW, entrance to the Theodore Roosevelt Bridge from an abandoned car left near there.
- June 9, 2013 – Joseph Clifford Reel, caused a driverless Jeep to speed down Pennsylvania Avenue and eventually crash into the gate as a diversion so he could spray paint the side of the White House. Reel was eventually arrested in the north courtyard and sentenced to 3 years in prison.
- March 2, 2015 – An unidentified man dressed in a construction workers' outfit tried to enter the White House grounds through the gate at Pennsylvania Avenue near East Executive Avenue in the early morning. He was stopped by Uniformed Division officers and taken into custody.
- May 20, 2016 – Jesse Olivieri attacked the White House security checkpoint before he was shot and arrested by Secret Service agents. After the incident, Secret Service authorities closed the White House for 45 minutes and also blocked nearby streets. Primary investigations showed that there is no connection with terrorists.
- March 18, 2017 – An unidentified man jumped over a bicycle rack on Pennsylvania Avenue, and was subsequently arrested.
- July 2017 – Secret Service agents arrested Travis Reinking for being in a "restricted area" near the White House. Secret Service reported that, "[Reinking] wanted to set up a meeting with the president." On April 22, 2018, Reinking was identified as the primary subject in the Nashville Waffle House shooting. Due to the 2017 White House arrest, Illinois police seized four weapons belonging to Reinking, including the AR-15 rifle used at the Nashville shooting. It is believed that the weapons were later retrieved by Reinking's father, and returned to his son sometime prior to April 22, 2018. Reinking was at large for over 24 hours before he was found and arrested on April 23, 2018, for the shooting at the Waffle House the previous day which killed four.
- August 10, 2020 – Myron Berryman, a 51-year-old man from Maryland, was shot by a Secret Service officer near 17th Street and Pennsylvania Avenue, a few blocks away from the White House after telling the officer he was armed and ran towards the officer with his hand in his pocket. The suspect who was unarmed was arrested and taken to a hospital where he was charged with assault. The president was holding a press briefing on the COVID-19 pandemic and was temporarily escorted from the briefing room by the Secret Service.
- May 22, 2023 – Sai Varshith Kandula, 19-year-old man from Chesterfield, Missouri, allegedly drove a U-Haul truck into a security fence. According to investigators, the man said he wanted to kill the president and praised Adolf Hitler after his arrest. A Nazi flag was recovered from the van.
- March 9, 2025 - On March 9, 2025, the Secret Service engaged Andrew Dawson, a 27-year-old man from North Manchester, Indiana, in a shootout close to the Eisenhower Executive Office Building after they spotted him walking near 17th Street NW. Dawson had a BOLO for being armed and suicidal. A BB gun and a cellphone-shaped gun were found on his person; a .22 caliber rifle, a magazine, and 23 rounds of ammunition were found in Dawson's car. He was arrested on the charges of carrying a pistol without a license, possession of an unregistered firearm, possession of unregistered ammunition, and carrying a rifle.

== See also ==
- Timeline of violent incidents at the United States Capitol
