= Gainous =

Gainous is a surname. Notable people with the surname include:

- Fred Gainous (born 1947), American academic administrator
- Gerald Gainous (born c. 1951), American White House intruder
