= Robert Latta =

Robert Latta could refer to:

- Robert Latta (philosopher) (1865-1932), Scottish philosopher
- Robert Allen Latta, known for the 1985 White House intrusion
- Bob Latta (born 1956), American politician
