= Timeline of violent incidents at the United States Capitol =

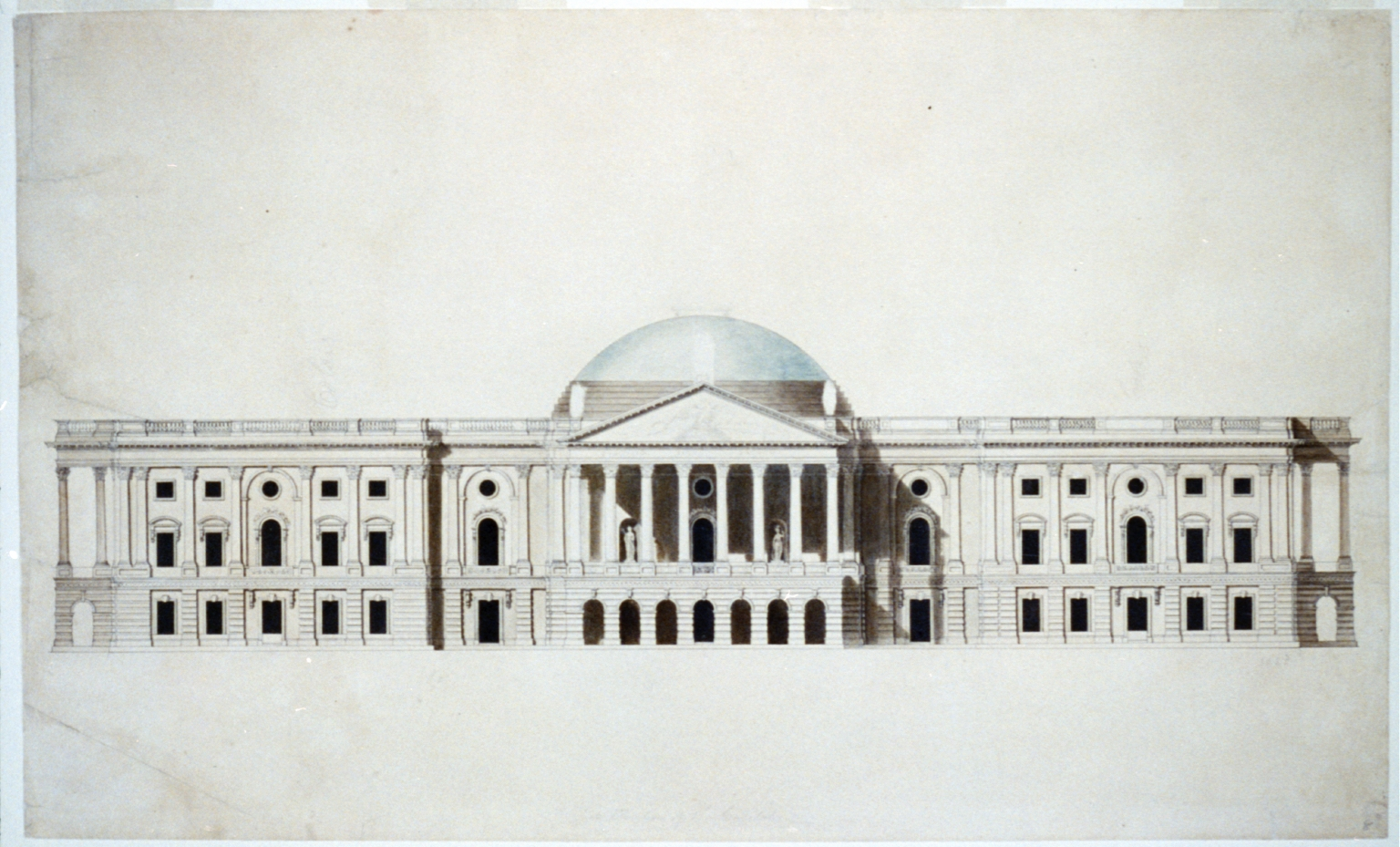
Original 1793 design of the United States Capitol by William Thornton

The United States Capitol in Washington, D.C., became the meeting place of the United States Congress when the building was initially completed in 1800. Since that time, there have been many violent and dangerous incidents, including shootings, fistfights, bombings, poisonings and a major riot.

The first significant incident was an act of war. During the War of 1812, the building was burned and severely damaged by British military forces in 1814, and then rebuilt. Other incidents were motivated by insanity, racism, fanaticism, extremism and personal grudges, and affected the Capitol building itself and sometimes other parts of the United States Capitol Complex. This timeline also includes incidents in which violence at the Capitol was only threatened, yet sufficient to disrupt normal procedures.

== 19th century ==
=== August 24, 1814 ===
John Warner Barber engraving showing the burning of the Capitol, published 1827

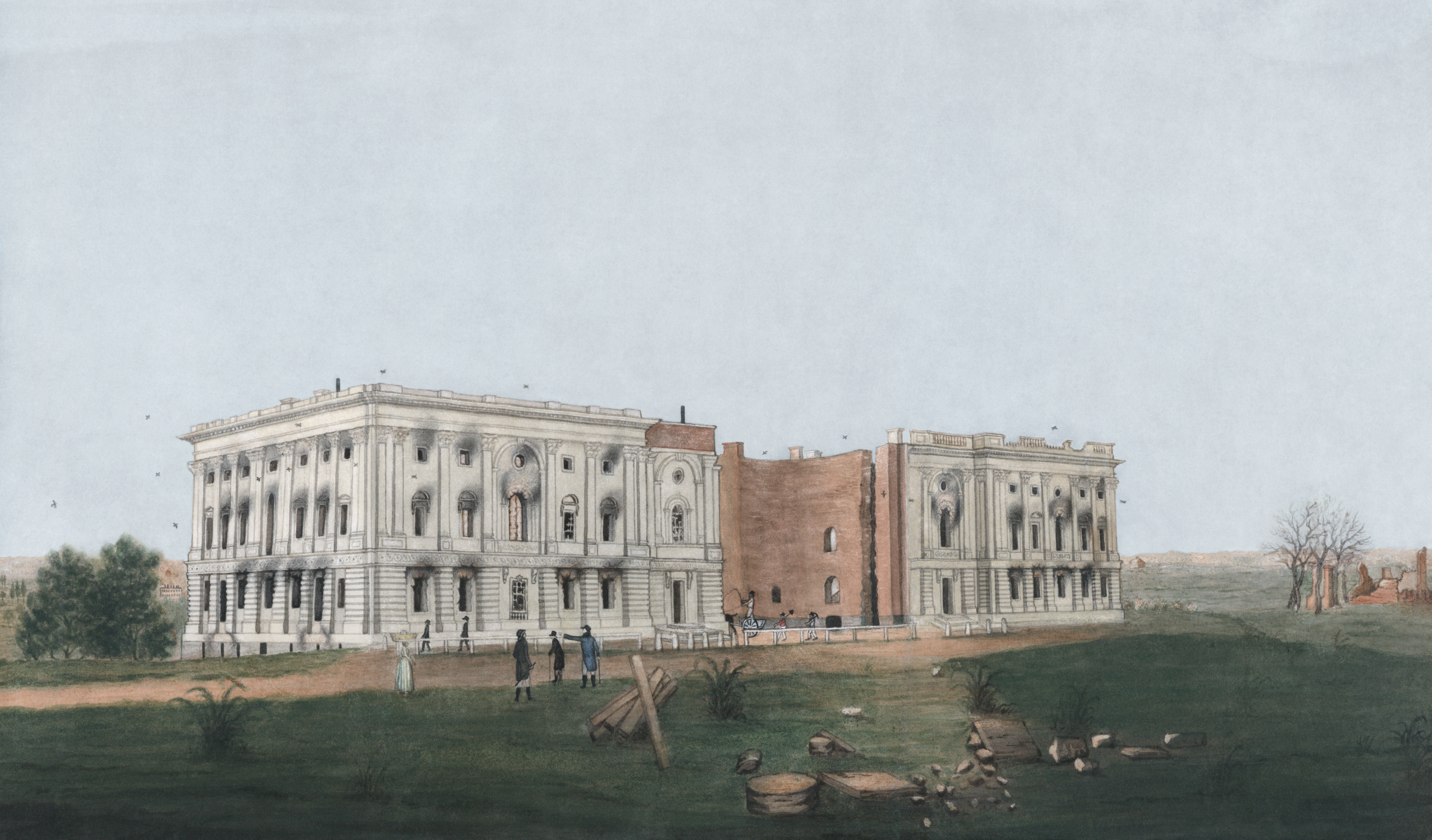
The Capitol building after the fire

During the War of 1812, British forces briefly took control of Washington on August 24, 1814. They set fires throughout the Capitol, and also burned the White House, the headquarters of both the War Department and the Treasury Department. Within the Capitol, British troops built bonfires in the chamber of the U.S. House of Representatives and the clerk's offices. They also set fires in the U.S. Supreme Court chamber and the Library of Congress, both of which were located in the Capitol at that time. The building had wooden floors and interior walls that helped spread the flames. Less than 24 hours later, a severe rainstorm put out the fires. Although the Capitol was gutted, the exterior stone walls survived, and the building was reconstructed and improved. It took five years until Congress reconvened at the Capitol. The attack was, at least in part, retaliation for American attacks in Canada, such as the Battle of York, which began on April 27, 1813, and that included the burning of the British colonial government buildings. Other US attacks included the Raid on Port Dover from May 14 to May 16, 1814; which included the burning of houses, flour mills, sawmills, distilleries, and barns. Reconstruction of the Capitol was planned and supervised by Benjamin Henry Latrobe, who was the second Architect of the Capitol.

=== April 1828 ===
At a White House reception during the John Quincy Adams presidency, Russell Jarvis, an anti-Adams reporter for the Washington Daily Telegraph, a Jacksonian newspaper, asserted that President Adams had publicly insulted Mrs. Jarvis, although Adams had criticized Jarvis himself. Since the president was considered to be immune from a dueling challenge, Jarvis attempted to initiate a duel with John Adams II, the president's son and personal secretary, who had been at the reception. Jarvis's efforts to provoke a duel with the younger Adams led to a highly publicized fight in the Capitol Rotunda. Jarvis struck Adams in the face and pulled his hair and grabbed his nose. Adams disapproved of dueling and non-violently refused to retaliate. An investigating committee of the United States House of Representatives determined that Jarvis had initiated the attack, but took no other action against Jarvis. Adams was cross examined by a hostile House staffer and castigated in much of the popular press as a coward. The incident led to the founding of the United States Capitol Police in response to a message from President Adams "requesting that Congress provide funds to secure the way between the president's office and Congress so that future incidents could be prevented." The police force was established by a law passed on May 2, 1828.

=== January 30, 1835 ===
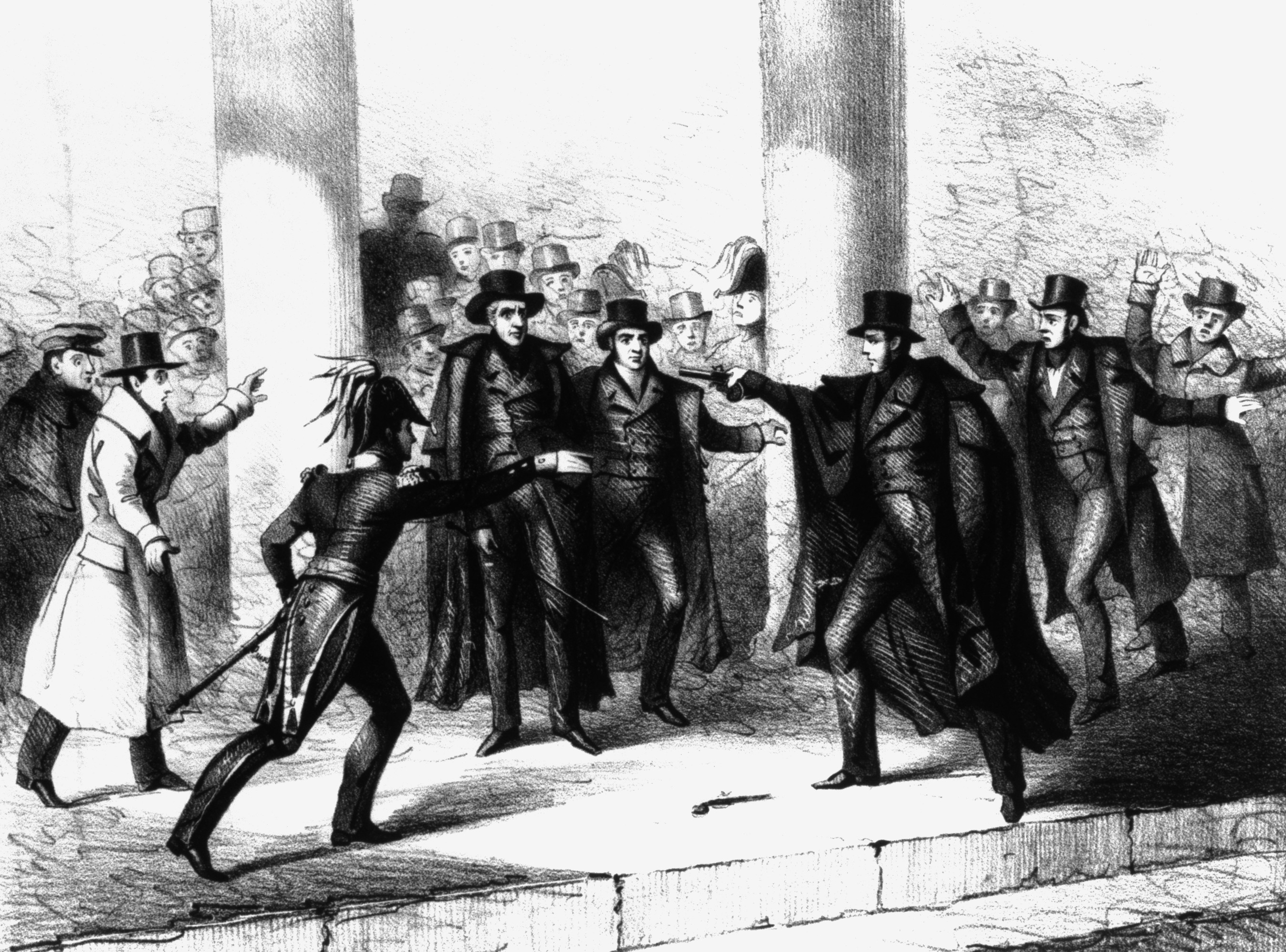
Attempted assassination of Andrew Jackson

Richard Lawrence was a British immigrant working as a house painter in and around Washington. In the early 1830s, his mental health deteriorated severely. He became convinced that he was actually King Richard III of England, that the U.S. government owed him a large sum of money, and that President Andrew Jackson was withholding his money and preventing him from returning to England.

Lawrence began observing Jackson's movements. He learned that Jackson was planning to attend the funeral of Congressman Warren R. Davis at the Capitol on January 30, 1835. Lawrence positioned himself at a spot just outside a door to the Capitol that he knew Jackson would exit through. When he saw Jackson, he tried to shoot him twice with a Derringer pistol, but his weapon misfired. Jackson fought back with a cane, and members of the crowd accompanying Jackson, which included Davy Crockett, then also a member of Congress, wrestled Lawrence to the ground, and he was arrested. Jackson was convinced that Lawrence was a tool of his opponents in the political Bank War about the future of the Second Bank of the United States. This was the first assassination attempt against a U.S. president. After a brief trial that included testimony about his mental state, Lawrence was found not guilty by reason of insanity and spent the rest of his life in insane asylums.

=== April 17, 1850 ===
In early 1850, the Senate was involved in bitter debates about the future of the western territories that had been acquired as a result of the U.S. victory in the Mexican–American War. The issues included the boundaries of Texas, the admission of California to the union, and which territories would permit slavery. Henry S. Foote was a pro-slavery senator, and Thomas Hart Benton, the longest-serving senator, had previously supported slavery but had later repudiated it. The two men despised each other and had frequently exchanged insults. During debate on April 17, 1850, about negotiating a compromise, Foote offered a motion to refer the matter to a special committee of 13 senators. Benton offered an amendment that undercut Foote's motion, and Vice President Millard Fillmore acting as presiding officer, ruled Benton's motion in order. Senator Henry Clay angrily objected to Fillmore's ruling, saying that it exceeded his authority, and a bitter debate among senators followed, with Foote and Benton shouting insults. Benton, a much larger man, left his seat and advanced toward Foote, who stood up, pulled out a pistol, and cocked it. Benton shouted, "I have no pistols! Let him fire! Stand out of the way and let the assassin fire!" Foote allowed another Senator to take his pistol while Benton demanded to be searched to prove that he was unarmed. The Senate quickly adjourned for the day. The Compromise of 1850 was finally enacted in September of that year.

=== May 22, 1856 ===
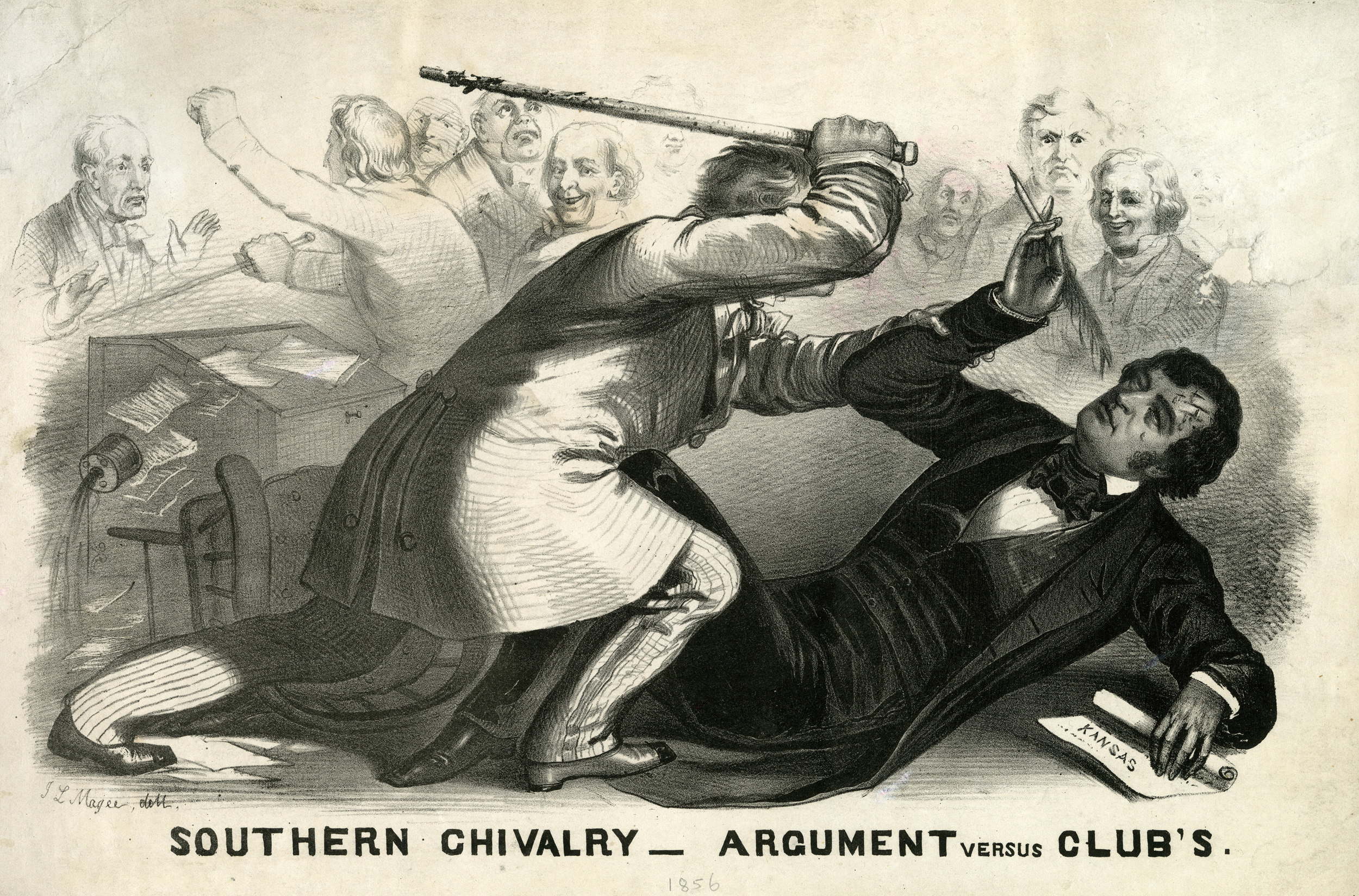
"Southern Chivalry", a lithograph of the caning of Charles Sumner

According to historian Joanne B. Freeman, there were about 70 incidents of violence between members of Congress between 1830 and 1860, mostly related to disputes about slavery. The most famous such incident of the era occurred on May 22, 1856. Abolitionist Senator Charles Sumner had delivered a forceful anti-slavery speech called "Crime against Kansas" two days before, during which he insulted pro-slavery Senator Andrew Butler. Sumner was sitting at his desk when he was approached by pro-slavery Congressman Preston Brooks, a cousin of Butler. Brooks shouted at Sumner, and hit him over the head with a cane at least a dozen times, leaving him bloody and severely injured. Pro-slavery Congressman Laurence M. Keitt stood by with a pistol and his cane to prevent other senators from coming to Sumner's assistance. It took Sumner three years to recover from his injuries, and he suffered from pain and trauma for the rest of his life. Brooks and Keitt resigned but were both re-elected. Sumner received great sympathy and support in the northern states, and Brooks was acclaimed in the southern states, and the incident contributed to regional polarization.

=== February 6, 1858 ===
On the evening of February 5, 1858 and into the early morning hours of February 6, the House of Representatives was debating the Lecompton Constitution, which was the second of four proposed constitutions for what became the new free state of Kansas three years later. This was an overtly pro-slavery draft with several provisions that also would have denied basic human rights to free people of color. At 2:00 a.m., antislavery Republican member Galusha Grow and pro-slavery Democrat Laurence M. Keitt insulted each other and then entered into a fistfight. About 30 other members joined in the brawl. Abolitionist Republicans Cadwallader Washburn and John F. Potter tore a wig off the head of Democrat William Barksdale, a slave owner who later became a Confederate general. Speaker of the House James Lawrence Orr ordered the sergeant-at-arms to arrest any members who continued fighting and the brawl died down. Two days later, the Lecompton Constitution was defeated.

=== February 13, 1861 ===
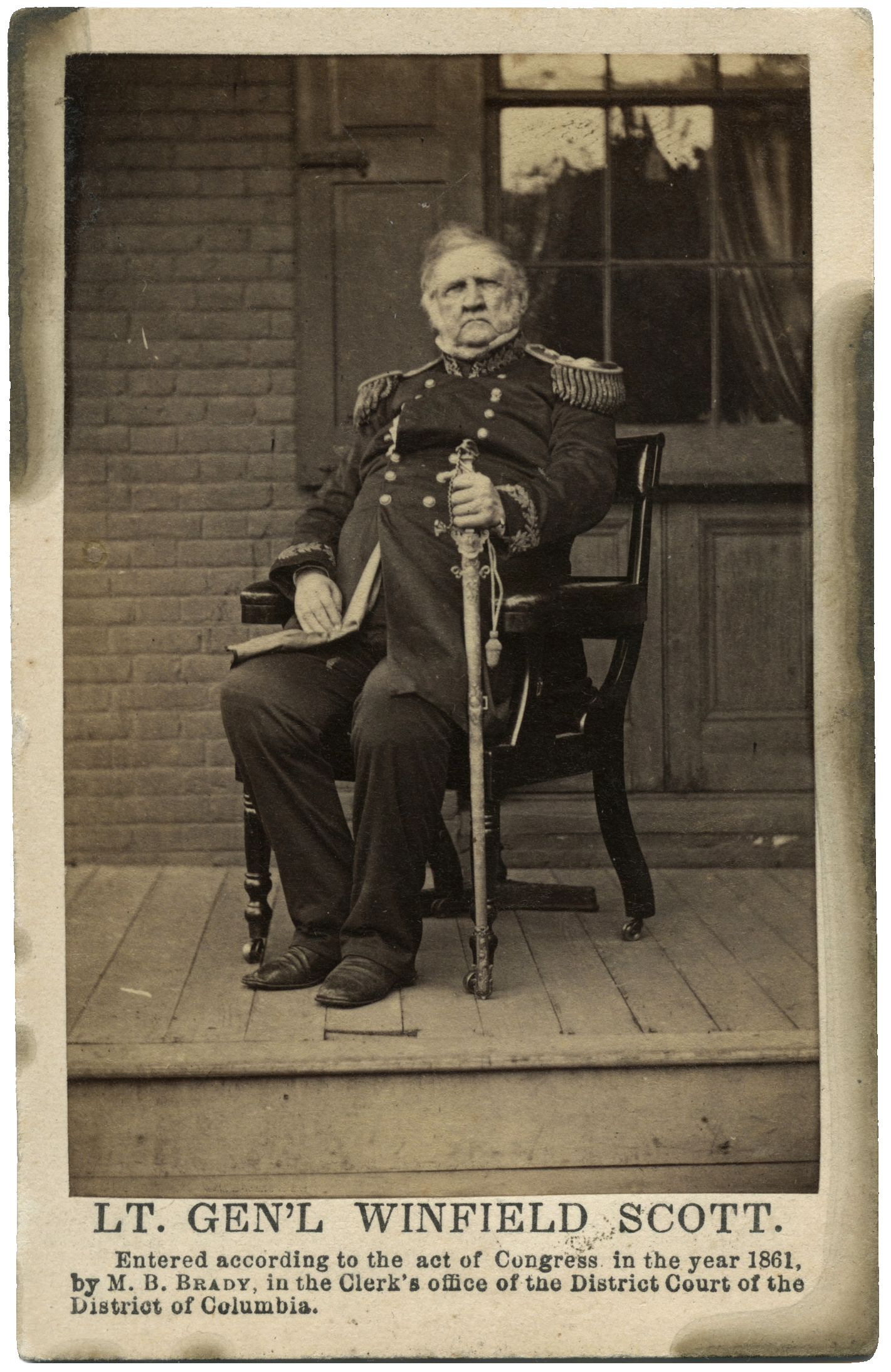
General Scott in 1861

A mob tried to break into the Capitol to disrupt the electoral vote count following the 1860 United States presidential election. Capitol security blocked their entry because they lacked proper credentials. Instead, the mob stood outside yelling insults at General Winfield Scott who headed the Capitol's security force. The mob's epithets included "Free state pimp!", "Old dotard!" and "Traitor to the state of his birth!" (Scott had been born in Virginia). Contemporaneous accounts described the crowd as "a caldron of inflammable material" intent upon "revolution".

=== July 11–12, 1864 ===
During the American Civil War, one year and one week after the Confederate loss at the Battle of Gettysburg, Confederate General Jubal Early and the corps he commanded within the Army of Northern Virginia came within six miles of capturing the Capitol Building. From his position in Maryland, General Early could see the Capitol in the distance. Union forces held lengthy meetings, to figure out how they could defend the city from Early's troops. Assistant Secretary of War Charles Dana sent a telegraph message to General Ulysses S. Grant: "General Halleck will not give orders except as he receives them; the President will give none, and until you direct positively and explicitly what is to be done, everything will go on in the deplorable and fatal way in which it has gone on for the past week." President Lincoln arrived at Fort Stevens and was told to take cover after he came under fire. In the leading federal brigade, every regimental commander was shot, and hundreds died on the Confederate side. General Early later wrote, "I had, therefore, reluctantly to give up all hopes of capturing Washington, after I had arrived in sight of the dome of the Capitol."

=== June 14, 1866 ===
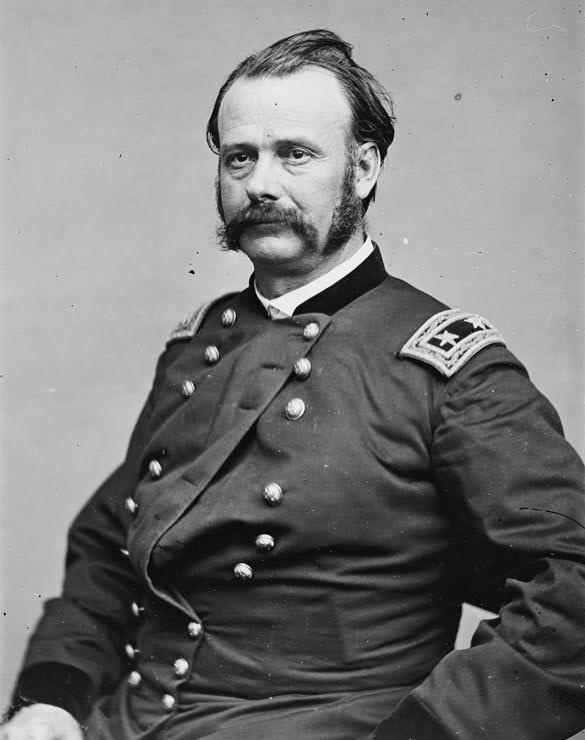
Lovell Rousseau

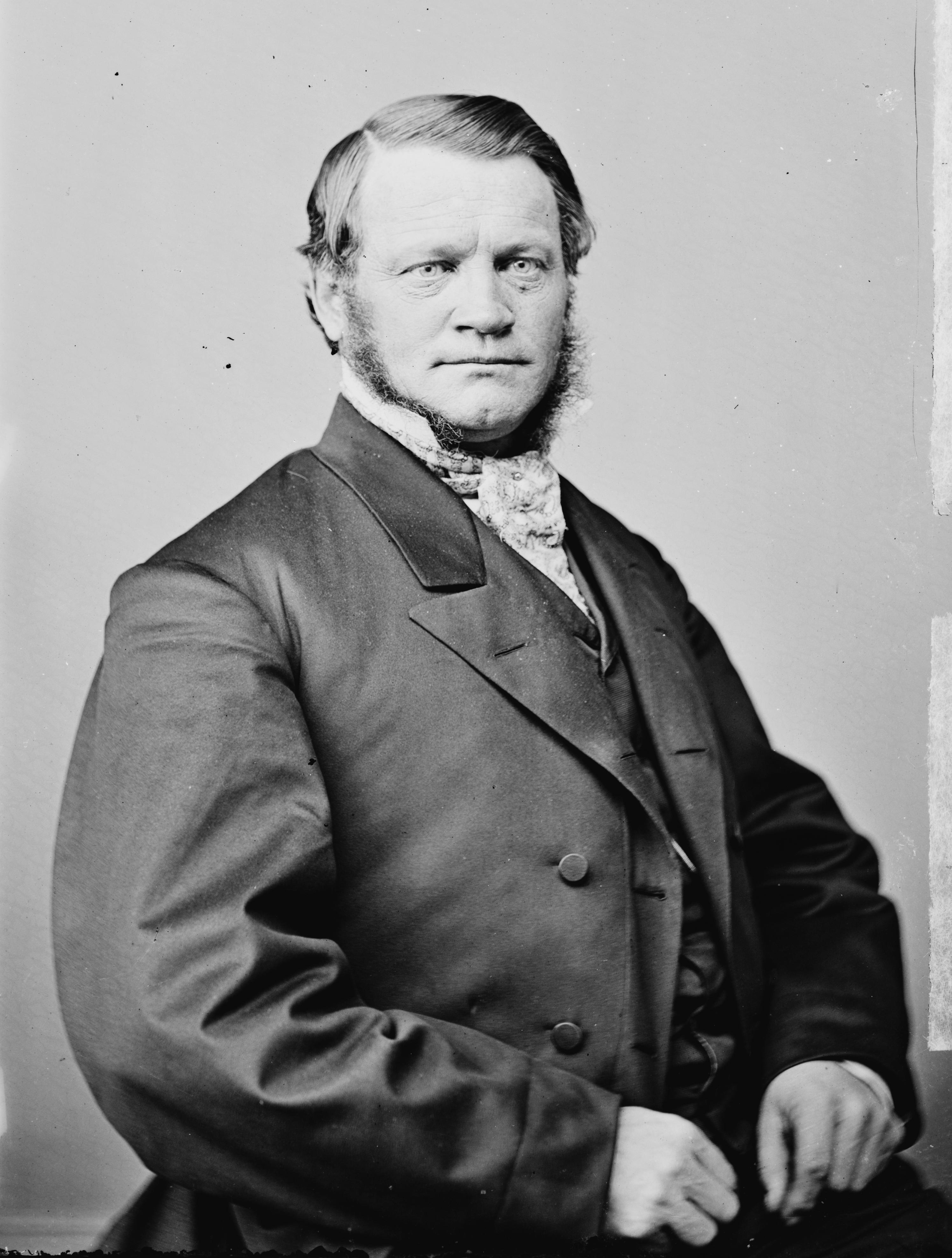
Josiah Bushnell Grinnell

After weeks of bitter verbal conflict on and off the floor of the House of Representatives, Lovell Rousseau of Kentucky, a Union Army General during the U.S. Civil War, beat Josiah Bushnell Grinnell of Iowa in the East Front House portico of the Capitol, hitting him repeatedly with a steel-tipped cane, while Rousseau's armed supporters stood by. Grinnell was bruised but not more seriously injured. Rousseau was censured by the House of Representatives, resigned in protest, and was re-elected.

=== February 28, 1890 ===
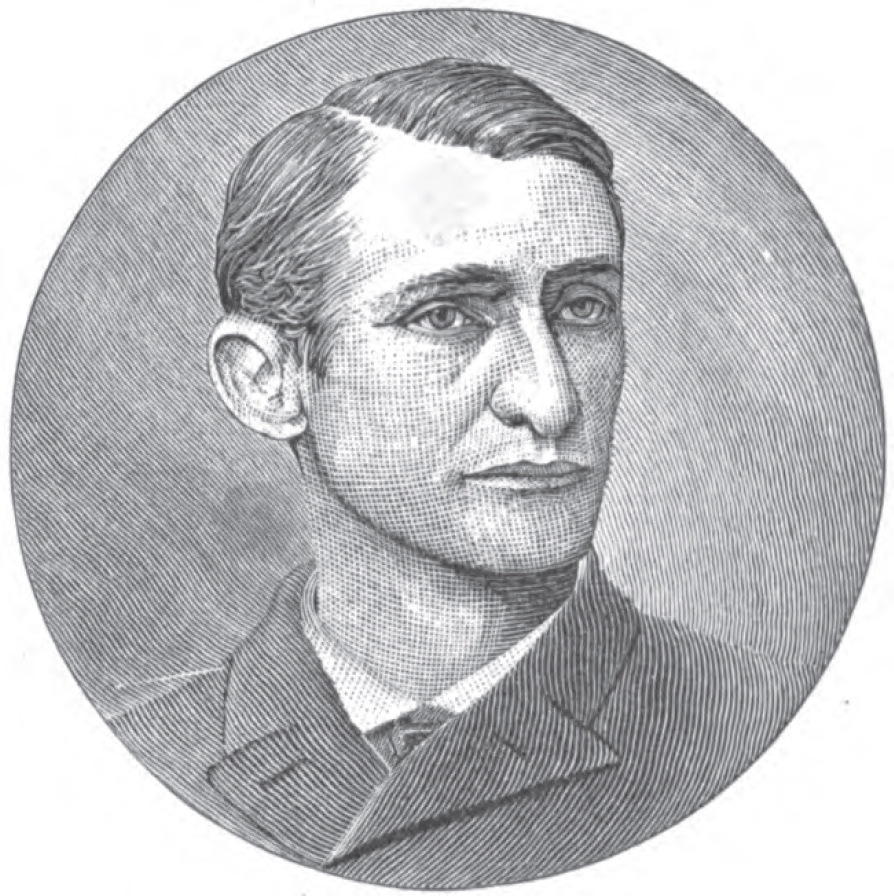
William Taulbee

Charles Kincaid was a journalist covering Congress who wrote stories critical of Congressman William P. Taulbee in the late 1880s, accusing him of financial corruption and having an extramarital affair. Taulbee decided against running for re-election, and became a lobbyist instead. The men despised each other and would insult each other at the Capitol. On February 28, 1890, they argued and Taulbee grabbed the much smaller Kincaid and shoved him against a wall. Kincaid went home and got a pistol. He found Taulbee on the staircase from the House chamber to the restaurant below, and shot him in the face. Taulbee died eleven days later. Accused of murder, Kincaid pleaded self defense and was acquitted.

== 20th century ==
=== July 2, 1915 ===
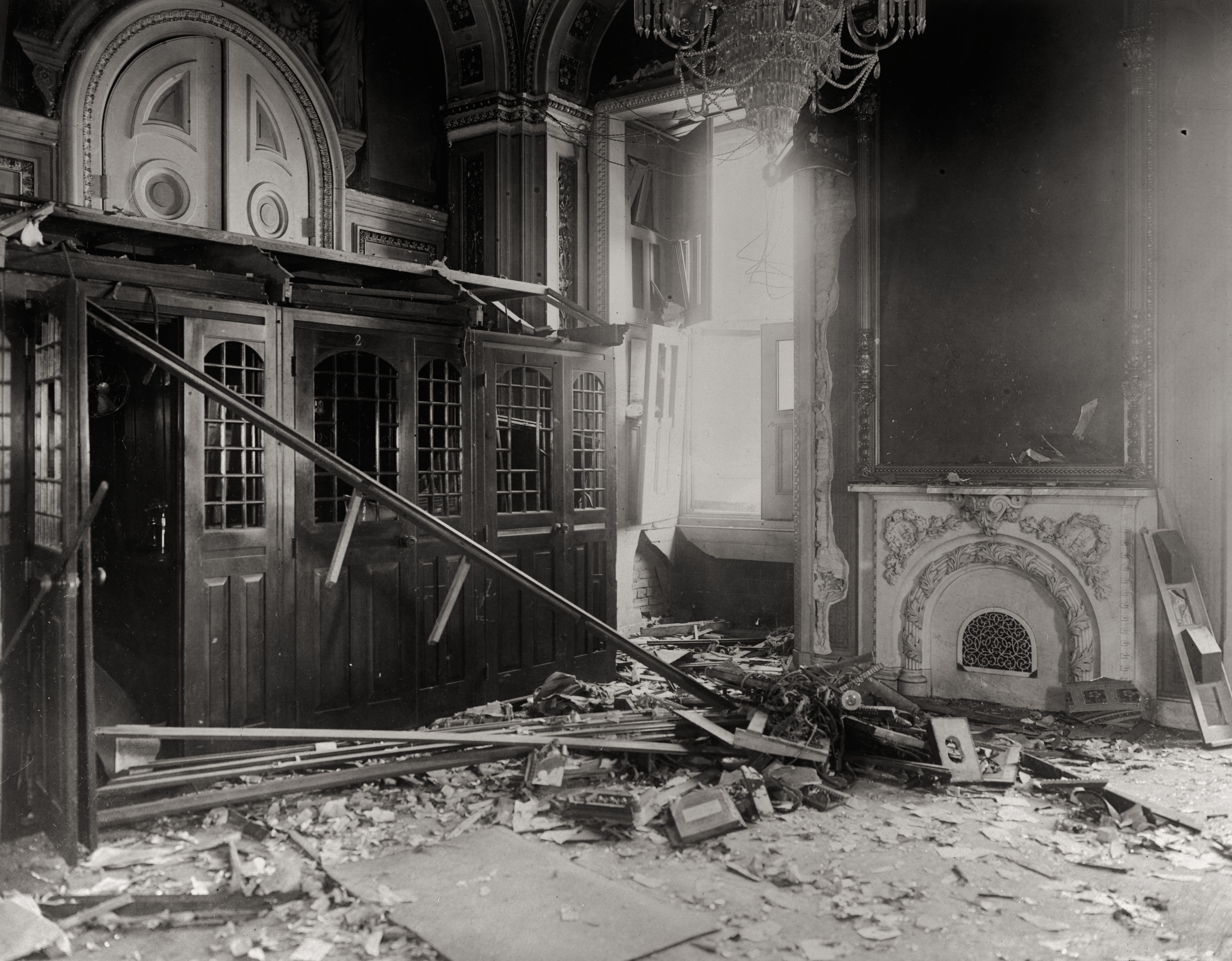
Damage in the Senate after the bombing

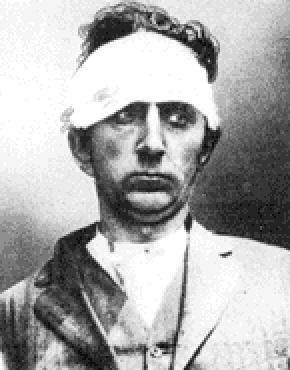
Erich Muenter after his arrest

Eric Muenter (or Münter) was a German-American who worked as an academic at American universities in the early 20th century. In 1906, while teaching German at Harvard University, he allegedly murdered his pregnant wife with arsenic. He fled, took on a new identity as "Frank Holt", and started working at Cornell University and remarried. Although sympathetic to the German Empire, he presented himself as a neutral peace activist. On July 2, 1915, he went to the Capitol with a bomb consisting of three sticks of dynamite and a timing mechanism. He had planned to place his bomb in the Senate chamber but found it locked. Instead, he placed the bomb underneath a telephone switchboard in a Senate reception room, where it exploded late at night causing significant damage but no casualties. Muenter then traveled to New York City and placed a small bomb on board the SS Minnehaha, an ocean liner being used as a munitions ship. The bomb exploded several days later when the ship was at sea, but caused little damage. Muenter immediately traveled to Long Island and forced his way into the mansion owned by J.P. Morgan Jr. on July 3 and shot the financier twice, though he recovered. Subdued and arrested at the Morgan residence, Muenter attempted suicide on July 5 and succeeded at killing himself on July 6.

=== December 13, 1932 ===
Marlin Kemmerer was a 25-year-old clerk at a Sears, Roebuck & Co. department store in Allentown, Pennsylvania, and an excellent marksman. In December, 1932, he took a train to Washington with a pistol, ammunition and two sticks of dynamite. He rented a hotel room and spent four days writing a speech describing his proposed solutions to the Great Depression. On December 13, Kemmerer went to the gallery of the House of Representatives, where Congressman Louis Thomas McFadden had introduced a resolution calling for the impeachment of President Herbert Hoover, who had been defeated in his re-election bid the previous month. The House had just voted 361 to 8 to table the motion, to applause by both Republicans and Democrats. Kemmerer then stood at the railing of the House gallery, waving his pistol over his head, demanding to speak for 20 minutes. A page shouted a warning, and most members exited the House floor. Member Edith Nourse Rogers, who had experience counseling shell shocked veterans of World War I, worked to calm him down. Melvin Maas, a Marine combat veteran, stood directly below on the House floor, encouraging him to drop the gun, which he did, and Maas caught it. Fiorello La Guardia then detained Kemmerer with the assistance of an off-duty police officer. After a month in jail, he was released at the request of House members. He went on to marry and have seven grandchildren. He died in 2000.

=== July 12, 1947 ===
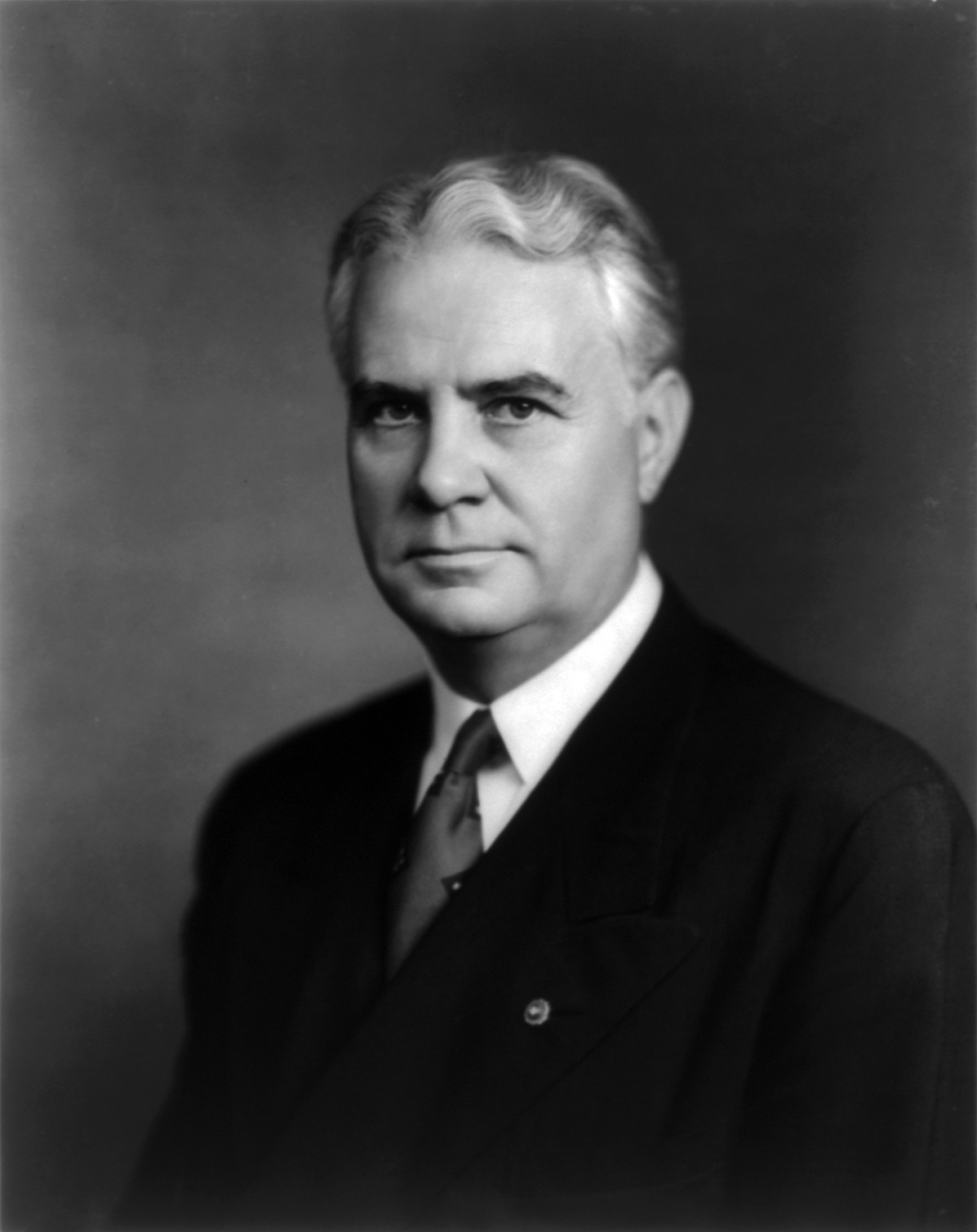
John W. Bricker

William Louis Kaiser was an Ohio man who lost money in the 1934 collapse of a savings and loan company in Columbus. He testified in a legal case, and John W. Bricker was the Attorney General of Ohio at that time. Kaiser later became a Capitol police officer, and later Bricker was elected to the U. S. Senate, and Kaiser lost his patronage job as a result. Kaiser confronted Bricker at least once in the Capitol, insisting that he should get back the money he had lost, and Kaiser took to hanging around the entrance to the Senate chamber. On July 12, 1947, Kaiser followed Bricker into a station of the Capitol subway system, pulled out a pistol, and fired two shots at the senator, both of which missed. Bricker took cover behind a seat in a subway car. Kaiser was arrested and committed to a mental hospital.

=== March 11, 1949 ===
69-year-old Thomas C. Williams, a World War I veteran from Buffalo, New York, shot and killed himself in a Senate corridor as a filibuster was occurring. Williams wrote in a suicide note that he had committed suicide to bring attention to his concerns that the United States and world at large were not progressing as a society.

=== March 1, 1954 ===
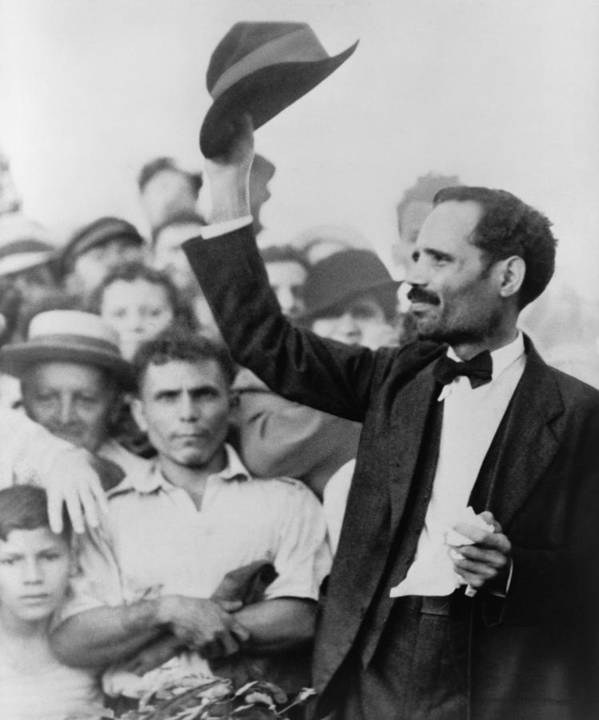
Pedro Albizu Campos addressing a crowd in 1936

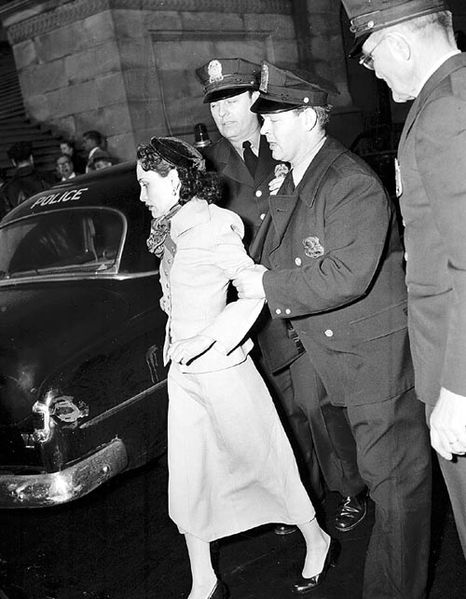
Lolita Lebrón after her arrest in 1954

On October 30, 1950, under the leadership of Pedro Albizu Campos, the pro-independence Puerto Rican Nationalist Party launched a series of armed revolts around the island that were quickly suppressed. 28 people were killed and 49 people were wounded. Two days later, two party members attempted to assassinate President Harry S. Truman at the Blair House, resulting in the deaths of a policeman and one of the attackers. Hundreds of Nationalists were arrested.

The Nationalists regrouped and launched another attack on March 1, 1954. Lolita Lebrón, Rafael Cancel Miranda, Andres Figueroa Cordero, and Irvin Flores Rodríguez went to the public gallery of the House of Representatives and unfurled a Puerto Rican flag, and then began shooting at members of Congress, who were debating an immigration bill. Five members were wounded, but all recovered. The victims were Alvin M. Bentley, Clifford Davis, Ben F. Jensen, George Hyde Fallon, and Kenneth A. Roberts. Bentley was shot in the chest and the other wounds were less severe.

The attackers were arrested, tried and convicted in federal court, and given long prison sentences. Cordero was released in 1978, and in 1979, President Jimmy Carter commuted the other sentences.

=== June 19, 1954 ===
On June 19, 1954, Wyoming Senator Lester C. Hunt shot and killed himself with a hunting rifle in an apparent suicide in his Senate office.

=== September 2, 1969 ===
15-year-old Greg Rogers committed suicide by shooting himself near the statue of John Marshall outside the Capitol. A note found on his body referenced his opposition to the Vietnam War.

=== March 1, 1971 ===
The Weather Underground was a successor group to the Weatherman faction of Students for a Democratic Society. They engaged in a widespread campaign of bombings in the early 1970s, in opposition to the war in Southeast Asia.

On March 1, 1971, Weather Underground members planted a bomb in a men's restroom one floor below the chamber of the U.S. Senate. They used a stopwatch connected to a fuse to control the time of the explosion and issued a warning by telephone half an hour before the bomb detonated. The blast devastated the bathroom, smashing the plumbing fixtures. The doors to the Senate barbershop were torn off their hinges and crashed through a window ending up in a courtyard. Lighting fixtures, plaster and tile were damaged in the corridor. A stained glass window in the Senate dining room was badly damaged.

The group issued a statement saying they had attacked "the very seat of U.S. white arrogance" to protest against the invasion of Laos that had begun on February 8, hoping to "freak out the warmongers". No one was ever arrested or convicted for this bombing.

=== October 18, 1983 ===
Israel Rubinowits, an Israeli visiting the United States, entered the Capitol on October 18, 1983, and went to the visitor's gallery of the House of Representatives. He was observed manipulating what appeared to be a bomb. When approached by four plainclothes officers, he threatened to detonate the bomb before being subdued. The device which had been concealed under his clothes consisted of two plastic bottles filled with a flammable liquid, gunpowder and improvised shrapnel, and was rigged to a detonator with copper wire. In court, his attorney said that he planned to address Congress about world hunger.

Rubinowits later pleaded guilty to a reduced charge of disturbing Congress and received a six-month jail sentence which was suspended when he agreed to be deported to Israel and never return to the United States. This case was cited as an example of the discriminatory differences in the punishment of Arabs and Israelis accused of similar crimes in the U.S.

=== November 7, 1983 ===
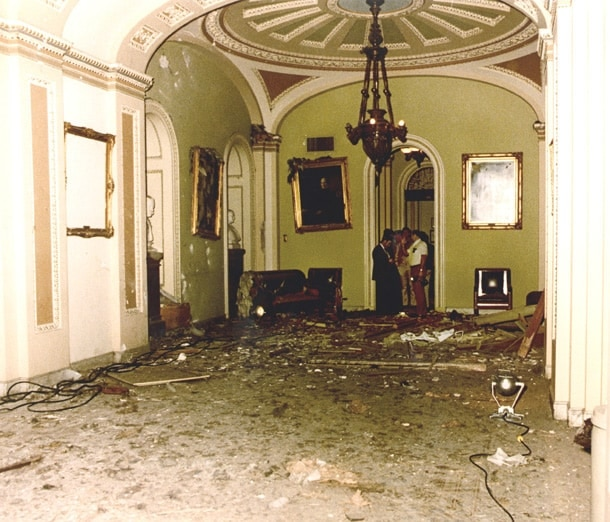
Damage from the 1983 bombing

The May 19th Communist Organization was a women-led successor to the Weather Underground. Active from 1978 to 1985, the group engaged in domestic terrorism. The group also incorporated members of the Black Liberation Army. The organization carried out two prison escapes, several armed robberies, the killing of three armored car guards, and at least seven bombings. On November 6, 1983, two members of the group assembled a bomb in a restroom at the Capitol that failed to go off. The following day, they returned and assembled a second bomb, which detonated, causing extensive damage but no casualties.

After an investigation that lasted four and a half years, seven people were charged for the Capitol bombing and seven other bombings on May 12, 1988, On December 6, 1990, Laura Whitehorn and Linda Evans were sentenced to long prison terms for conspiracy and malicious destruction of government property. Whitehorn was released after serving 14 years in prison. Evans was released after 16 years when President Bill Clinton commuted her sentence.

=== July 24, 1998 ===
Russell Eugene Weston Jr. was a man with a history of paranoid schizophrenia that included involuntary commitment in a hospital in Montana for 53 days. He believed that he had the power to prevent the United States from being destroyed by a deadly disease that he called Black Heva and by swarms of cannibals. He believed that President Bill Clinton was a Russian clone, and that there was a time machine called the ruby satellite stored in a Senate safe that would help him in his quest. On July 24, 1998, Weston went to the Capitol and triggered the metal detector at the entrance. When questioned by Capitol Police officer Jacob Chestnut, he killed the officer with a shot to his head. Officer Douglas McMillan fired at Weston, who then wounded McMillan. A tourist was also wounded. Weston then ran into an office used by Congressman Tom DeLay, and fatally shot Capitol Police detective John Gibson, assigned to protect DeLay. Before dying, Gibson shot Weston four times, and Weston was subdued and arrested by two other police officers. Following a court-ordered psychiatric evaluation, a federal judge determined that Weston was incompetent to stand trial, and as of 2021, Weston remains confined in a mental hospital.

== 21st century ==
=== September 11, 2001 ===
On September 11, 2001, members of the Islamic terrorist group Al Qaeda hijacked and took control of the cockpits of four airliners in the United States. Two of these planes struck the two towers of the World Trade Center in New York, completely destroying that complex. A third plane struck The Pentagon, causing severe damage. The fourth plane, United Airlines Flight 93, departed from Newark, New Jersey, bound for San Francisco with 44 people on board. About 46 minutes later, while the plane was over Ohio, four hijackers took control of the plane. Hijacker Ziad Jarrah, who had been trained as a pilot, reversed its westward course to the southeast, toward Washington.

Through cellphone communications, the passengers became aware of at least two of the earlier attacks, and fought to take control away from the hijackers. The plane crashed in Shanksville, Pennsylvania, 125 miles (201 km) away from Washington, killing all 44 people on board. Khalid Sheikh Mohammed and Ramzi bin al-Shibh, who planned the attacks and were later arrested, have claimed that the intended target of Flight 93 was the U.S. Capitol. The 9/11 Commission Report also concluded that the plane was probably heading for the Capitol.

=== September 18, 2001 – October 12, 2001 ===
Beginning a week after the September 11 attacks, letters containing poisonous anthrax spores were mailed, initially to five media organizations. The attacks were first detected at the headquarters of American Media in Boca Raton, Florida which at that time owned the National Enquirer, a supermarket tabloid. A letter was also addressed to the offices of Tom Brokaw, an anchor at NBC News in New York, and also to ABC News, CBS News and the New York Post. The anthrax in the first round of letters was relatively crude, described as brown and grainy. Weeks later, letters containing a much finer and more dangerous anthrax formulation were mailed to Senator Tom Daschle, then the Senate Majority Leader, and Senator Patrick Leahy. As these envelopes passed through the postal system, anthrax particles were spread widely in many locations, and other pieces of mail were contaminated. The worst contamination at the Capitol was in the Hart Senate Office Building. In all, five people died, and 22 people became infected with variations of anthrax disease. Of those who died, two were employees of American Media, two were postal workers and one was a New York hospital employee who worked near the mail room.

The Environmental Protection Agency spent $27 million to decontaminate Capitol facilities, and it took three months to complete the work at the Hart Senate Office Building. Decontamination of the Brentwood Mail Processing Center in Washington took over two years and cost $130 million. In 2010, the FBI, the Department of Justice, and the U.S. Postal Inspection Service closed their investigation, concluding that Bruce Ivins, a government scientist, was responsible for the anthrax attacks. Ivins had died by suicide in 2008. Senator Leahy and other senior officials and experts disagreed with the conclusion that Ivins was solely responsible.

=== October 3, 2013 ===
Miriam Carey was a 34-year-old dental hygienist from Stamford, Connecticut. Her family reported that, after giving birth in 2012, she suffered from postpartum depression with psychosis, for which she had been hospitalized. She believed herself to be the "Prophet of Stamford" and insisted that President Barack Obama had her house under electronic surveillance. Her boyfriend had reported concerns about her mental health and delusions to the Stamford Police Department.

On October 3, 2013, she was supposed to take her 18-month-old daughter to a doctor's appointment in Connecticut. Instead, she drove with her daughter to Washington. At 2:13 p.m., she drove into a restricted White House checkpoint, knocking down a Secret Service agent and colliding with a bike rack. She evaded arrest and struck another officer who fell on the hood of her car and rolled off. She then drove for many blocks down Pennsylvania Avenue at high speeds, running red lights. At the circle around the James A. Garfield Monument, adjacent to the Capitol, drivers of six law enforcement vehicles tried to box in her car, but she reversed, hitting a Secret Service agent and his vehicle, and drove away. She came to the barricaded U.S. Capitol Police Truck Interdiction Point across from the Hart Senate Office Building, made a sharp left turn and struck a police car. She then drove in reverse directly toward a Capitol Police officer. That officer and a Secret Service officer then opened fire, killing Carey. She had five bullet wounds in her neck and torso. They then discovered her uninjured daughter in the car.

=== April 15, 2015 ===
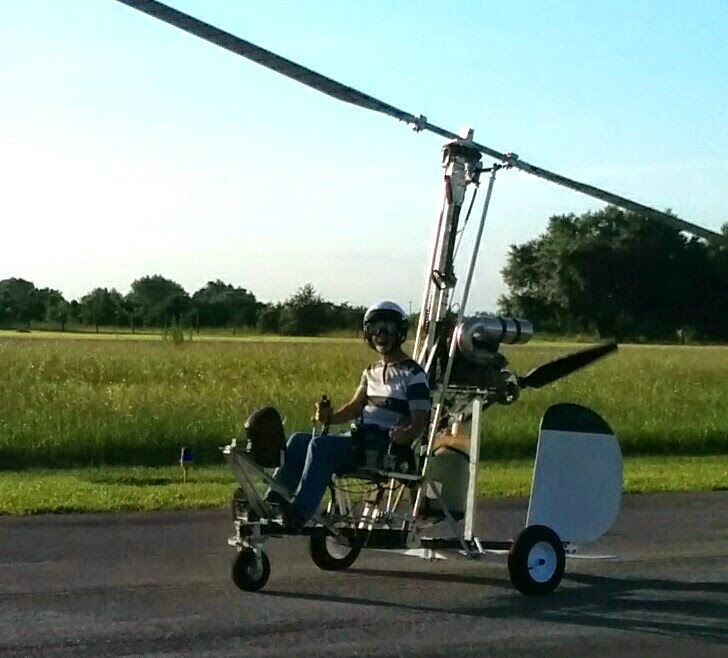
Doug Hughes in his gyrocopter in 2014

Doug Hughes was a postal worker from Ruskin, Florida who became obsessed with his advocacy for campaign finance reform. He developed a plan to draw attention to the issue by writing letters to every member of Congress, and then personally delivering those letters by piloting a gyrocopter to the Capitol. He spent two years planning and publicized his intentions on social media, and was interviewed by the Secret Service as least twice. On April 15, 2015, he took off from the Gettysburg Regional Airport. He was wearing his Postal Service jacket and had painted a postal service logo on the tail of his gyrocopter. He had 535 letters in trays strapped to his landing gear. He then flew toward Washington, where he crossed the Potomac River and entered the highly restricted airspace that includes the White House and the Capitol. He flew the length of the National Mall and landed on the west lawn of the Capitol, where he was promptly arrested, and his aircraft was examined by a bomb squad.

A prosecutor said that he could have collided with and destroyed an airliner. He pleaded guilty to a felony charge of flying without a license, spent three months in prison and 13 months wearing an ankle monitor. He lost his job. Two years later, the government returned the letters, and he mailed them off from the same Florida post office where he had previously worked.

=== March 28, 2016 ===
Larry Russell Dawson was a man in his late 60s who had been involved in three previous security incidents at the U.S. Capitol. In 2015, he had attempted to bring an illegal protest sign into the Capitol and had been arrested later that year for "shouting Bible verses from the House gallery and running from an officer." Dawson said that God had declared him a prophet and instructed him to advocate for an increase in the minimum wage. On March 28, 2016, Dawson was seen with a handgun at a screening point at the United States Capitol Visitor Center, and a Capitol Police officer shot him twice. A bystander was also injured. Dawson's weapon was later determined to be a BB gun. He was wounded in the chest and thigh, and was hospitalized for several weeks. Dawson had a history of mental illness, which was treated while he was incarcerated. He pleaded guilty, apologized to the court, and in March 2017, was sentenced to 11 months in prison for the shooting incident, and an additional three months for failing to appear in court following his 2015 arrest.

=== January 6, 2021 ===
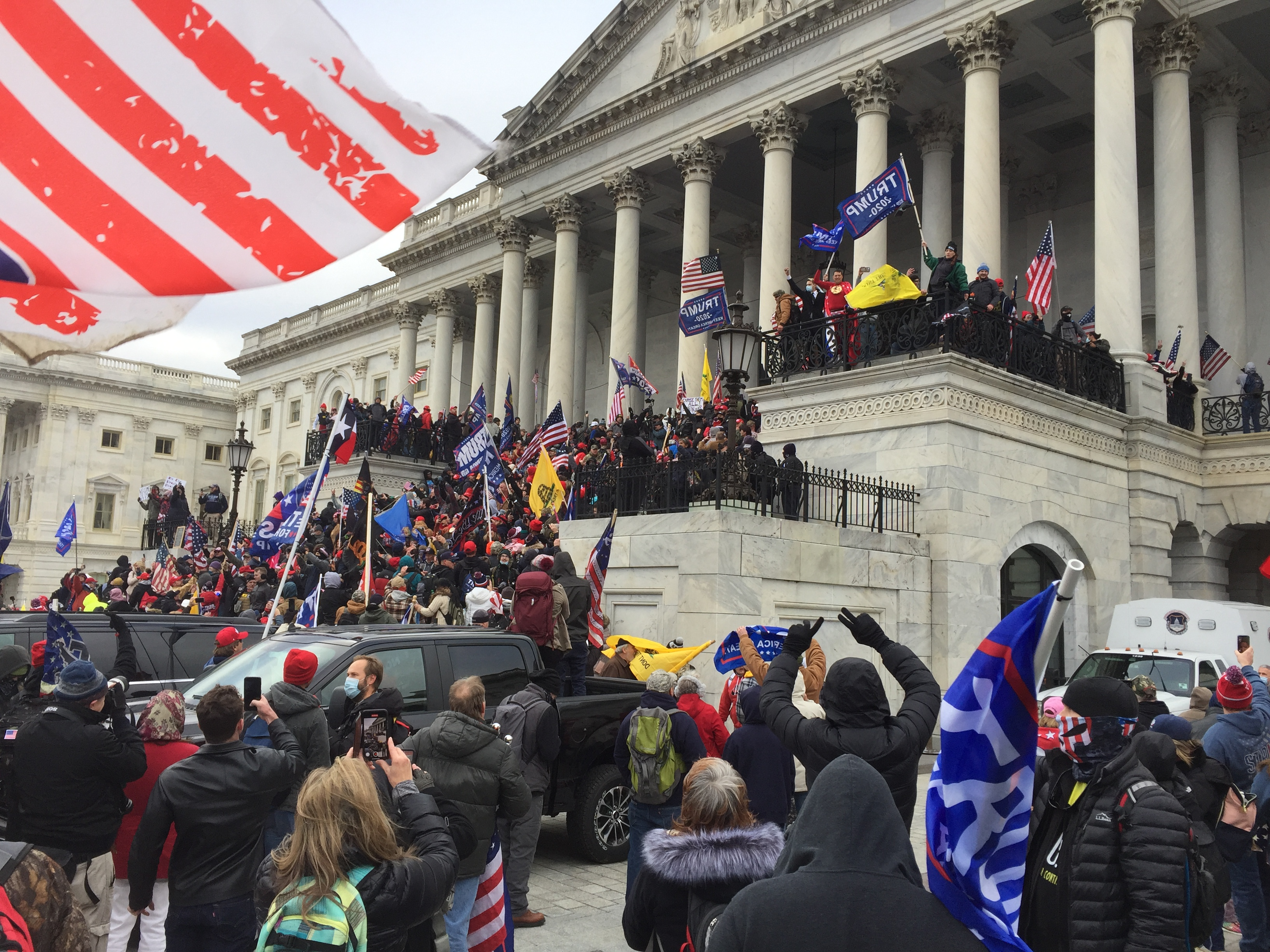
Rioters at the Capitol after breaching police lines

When President Donald Trump was defeated in the 2020 United States presidential election, he refused to concede his loss but said he would leave the White House. He asserted that the results were fraudulent, filed many unsuccessful lawsuits in the swing states, and appealed to state and local election officials to help him claim victory. All of these efforts were unsuccessful. Trump then focused on the Electoral College vote count scheduled for January 6. For weeks, he encouraged his followers to come to Washington and rally to "Stop the Steal" on that date. During and after Trump's rally, thousands of his supporters breached police lines, battling intensely with police officers, and about 800 of them broke into the Capitol. The rioters briefly occupied the chambers of both houses of Congress, and broke into several congressional offices. Open death threats were made against Vice President Mike Pence and Speaker of the House Nancy Pelosi. Rioting took place for over three hours.

Many participants in the January 6 attack were arrested in the days and months that followed, which saw the largest criminal investigation in U.S. history. According to a New York Times report in May 2023, "While many people have called the events of Jan. 6 an 'insurrection', the Justice Department has not charged any rioters with that crime." The FBI classified the attack as domestic terrorism. Some of the participants in the attack were members of, or had previously expressed support for, fringe views or right-wing extremist groups, including the Proud Boys, Oath Keepers, and Three Percenters. The U.S. Attorney in the District of Columbia said that "The investigation and prosecution of the Capitol Attack will likely be one of the largest in American history, both in terms of the number of defendants prosecuted and the nature and volume of the evidence".

Some 1,143 defendants were charged with federal crimes for their roles in the January 6 attack. Many were charged with crimes of violence against police and with criminal conspiracy. Many others were charged with theft, obstructing an official proceeding, or illegally breaching the building. As of September 2023, at least 660 defendants had pleaded guilty to one or more crimes. A total of 140 defendants went to trial (either a jury or a bench trial): of these, 97 defendants were convicted of all charges, 41 defendants had mixed verdicts (i.e., convicted on at least one charge but not all charges), and two defendants were acquitted on all charges.

As of September 8, 2023, at least 632 January 6 participants had been sentenced for their crimes, of whom 64% were given prison sentences. The median sentence for participants who received prison time was 120 days. The most serious charge brought in the January 6 cases was seditious conspiracy; January 6 defendants convicted of seditious conspiracy include Oath Keepers leaders Elmer Stewart Rhodes and Kelly Meggs, and six of their followers; and Proud Boys leader Enrique Tarrio and his followers Joseph Randall Biggs, Ethan Nordean, Jeremy Bertino, and Zach Rehl. The longest January 6 sentences were handed to Tarrio (22 years), Rhodes (18 years), Biggs (17 years), Rehl (15 years); Peter Schwartz (14 years), Meggs (12 years); Daniel "D.J." Rodriguez (12 years), Thomas Webster (10 years) and Dominic Pezzola (10 years). Other sentences included those of Jessica Watkins (8.5 years), Patrick McCaughey (7.5 years), Kyle Young (more than 7 years), Albuquerque Cosper Head (7.5 years), Guy Reffitt (more than 7 years), Thomas Robertson (more than 7 years), Julian Khater (more than 6 years), Robert Palmer (more than 5 years), and Richard "Bigo" Barnett (4.5 years). Those who received the longest sentences were those who planned the attack or perpetrated the most violent attacks on police. Jacob Chansley (the "QAnon shaman" who invaded the Senate chamber) was sentenced to 3.5 years.

=== April 2, 2021 ===
Noah Green was a 25-year-old man from Indiana who had delusions, paranoia and suicidal thoughts, and had become a follower of the Nation of Islam. On the afternoon of April 2, 2021, Green rammed a vehicle into two Capitol Police officers near a Constitution Avenue checkpoint on the security perimeter on the northern entrance to the Capitol, a heavily fortified zone, killing one officer, William F. Evans, and wounding another. Capitol Police, local D.C. police, the FBI's Washington Field Office, and a National Guard quick-response team all responded to the scene. After ramming the car into officers, Green exited the vehicle and brandished a knife at officers, and was fatally shot by police.

The attack occurred about three months after the January 6 Capitol insurrection, and two weeks after authorities dismantled an outer perimeter fence surrounding the Capitol and re-opened Independence Avenue and Constitution Avenue to traffic. A fence around the Capitol's inner perimeter remained.

=== August 19, 2021 ===
The morning of August 19, 2021, Floyd Ray Roseberry of Grover, North Carolina, drove a pickup truck onto the sidewalk in front of the Thomas Jefferson Building of the Library of Congress. Roseberry told United States Capitol Police officers who arrived to investigate the scene that he possessed a bomb, and police saw what appeared to be a detonator in his hand. Nearby congressional office buildings and U.S. Supreme Court building were evacuated. He ranted against the government and posted a rambling video on Facebook Live, in which he claimed to have gunpowder, ammonium nitrate, and tannerite in his car; demanded to speak to President Joe Biden; called on Biden to resign; said "I'm ready to die for the cause"; called himself "a Patriot"; said that the "revolution starts today"; and expressed grievances with Democrats. After hours of negotiations, Roseberry surrendered to police.

In a video posted to Facebook two days before the episode, Roseberry promoted far-right conspiracy theories that Democrats would be arrested, and former President Donald Trump returned to power. A day before the episode, a relative of Roseberry had warned authorities that the man might attempt an act of violence in D.C. or Maryland.

Roseberry was indicted by a federal grand jury on two charges. He has a history of mental illness, including bipolar disorder, but was determined to be competent to stand trial following a competency evaluation. The judge agreed with the conclusions of a behavioral psychologist who examined Roseberry and found that he was on medications that could contribute to a manic or psychotic episode. In January 2023, Roseberry pleaded guilty to threatening to use explosives; he was sentenced to five years of probation in September 2023.

=== August 14, 2022 ===
Early on the morning of August 14, 2022, Richard A. York III of Ocean View, Delaware, with Pennsylvania ties, crashed his car into a security barricade near the Capitol building. The car was engulfed in fire as he got out of the car. He then fired several shots into the air before fatally shooting himself as police officers approached. York had a criminal history, including burglary, theft and assault.

=== February 17, 2026 ===
Just after noon on February 17, 2026, Carter Camacho, an 18-year-old man, ran towards the building with multiple rounds of ammunition, a loaded 12-gauge Mossberg Maverick 88 pump-action shotgun and a tactical vest. Police officers told him to drop his weapon at the West Front, and he complied. He was taken into custody by the USCP officers. A helmet and gas mask were found in the suspect's SUV, which was parked in the 100 block of Maryland Avenue.

== See also ==
- List of members of the United States Congress killed or wounded in office
- Congressional baseball shooting
- List of White House security breaches
