= 1912 White House intrusion =

Security breach

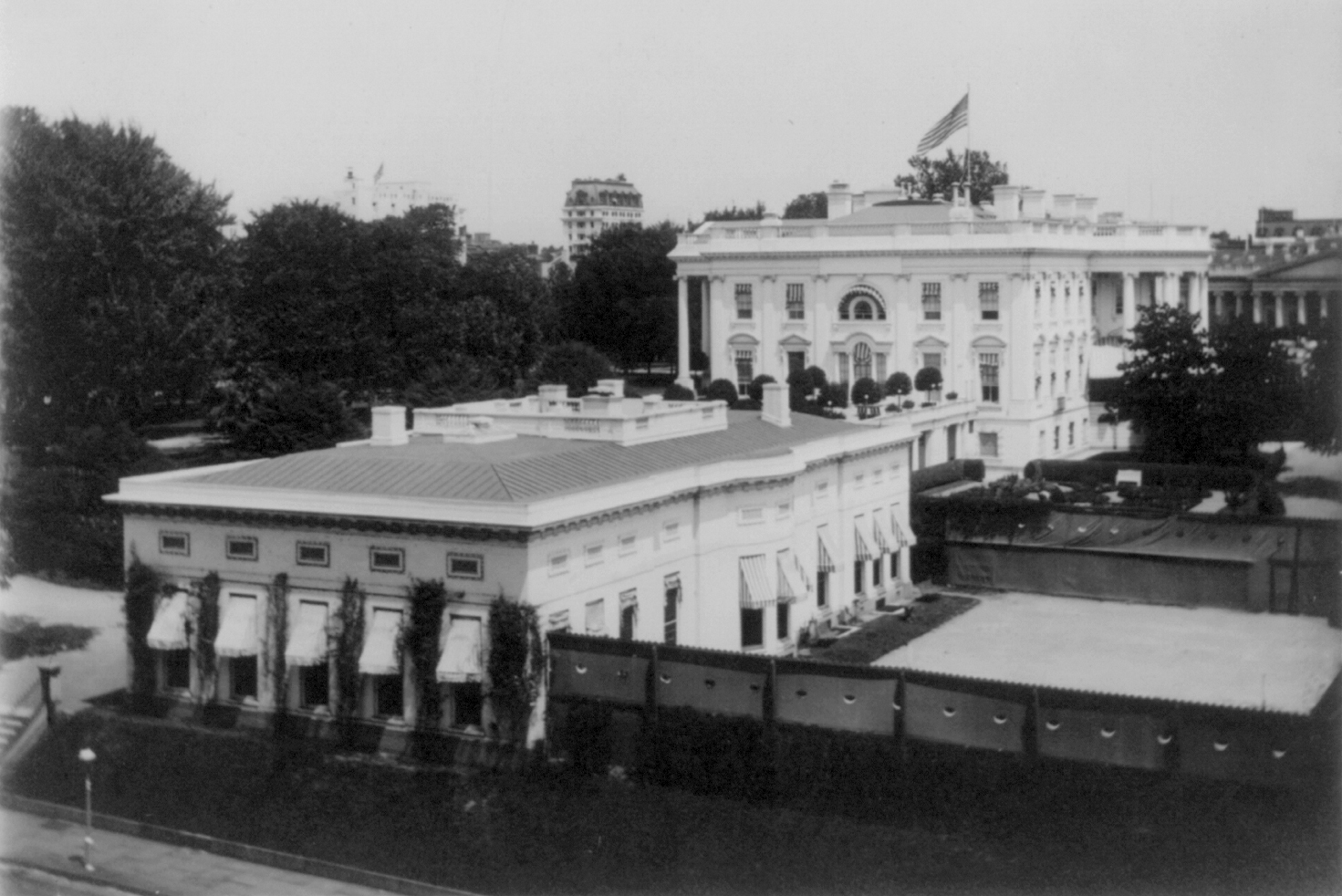
- The White House, as it appeared in 1909
- Location: The White House; Washington, D.C., U.S.
- Date: April 13, 1912
- Perpetrator: Michael Winter

The 1912 White House intrusion occurred on April 13, 1912, when a man who identified himself as "Michael Winter" successfully forced his way into the White House twice.

== History ==
On April 13, 1912, Winter approached the entrance to the White House, which civilians were allowed to do at the time. He initially rushed past the doorman, and became lost in the darkness of the hall inside. He was promptly caught and ejected. A few minutes later he repeated his attempt, though by this time the White House police chief and several officers were ready; they detained and searched him. An "ugly looking" clasp knife was found inside one of his pockets.

Winter did not attempt to fight the officers, though six were required to convince him to leave. He gave the name Michael Winter and stated he was from Baltimore. He was described as a tall, muscular man approximately 36 years old, having a quiet and collected demeanor and the appearance of a laborer. He said he was a German, and had twice applied to the German Ambassador, Count von Bernstorff, for a letter of introduction to speak to President William Howard Taft, though he had been denied on both occasions. Winter agreed to leave only on the promise that he would be taken to the German Embassy.

Winter was taken to a patrol wagon at the back of the White House, which instead took him to the nearest police station, and then to the Washington Asylum. He answered all the officers' questions, except that he refused to specify what it was he wanted to talk to the president about, stating only "I want to see the president, I must see him."

The New York Times reported that it was believed he intended to assassinate the president. The Day Book stated that Winter was believed to be mentally incompetent, though upon being booked into the asylum, he was regarded as "harmless." On 14 April 1912, The New York Times stated that he was to be "examined as to his mental soundness." On 17 April, The Chatham Record said that according to officials from the asylum, Winter showed no signs of insanity. On June 3, 1912, The Washington Times reported that Winter was one of three people to escape from the asylum in a thirty-six-hour period. They also reported that Winter had wanted to see President Taft about having all $10 notes withdrawn from circulation and replaced by smaller ones. According to a 2009 article by Wil Haygood from The Washington Post, there is no record of what became of Winter.

== Legacy ==
In 2014, Margaret Hartmann from New York magazine included the incident in a list of "The 7 Weirdest White House Security Breaches."

== See also ==
- White House intruders
