= Second inauguration of Ronald Reagan =

50th United States presidential inauguration

Second presidential inauguration of Ronald Reagan
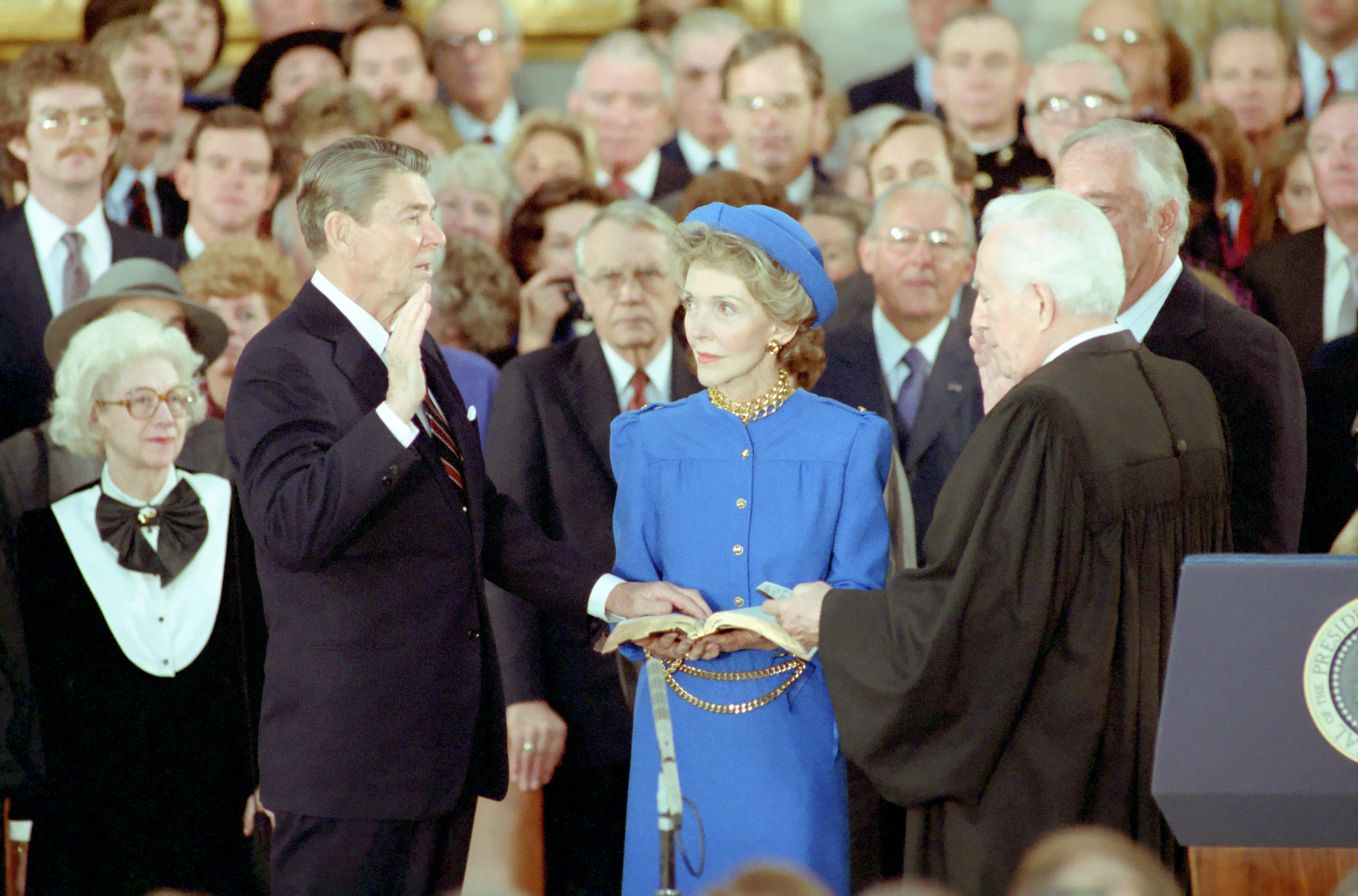
- Ronald Reagan takes the oath of office for his second term
- Date: January 20, 1985; 41 years ago (official); January 21, 1985 (public)
- Location: Entrance Hall, White House (official) United States Capitol, Washington, D.C. (public)
- Organized by: Joint Congressional Committee on Inaugural Ceremonies
- Participants: Ronald Reagan; 40th president of the United States — Assuming office Warren E. Burger; Chief Justice of the United States — Administering oath George H. W. Bush; 43rd vice president of the United States — Assuming office Potter Stewart; Former Associate Justice of the Supreme Court of the United States — Administering oath

The second inauguration of Ronald Reagan as president of the United States was the 50th inauguration, marking the commencement of his second and final four-year term as president and of George H. W. Bush as vice president. A private swearing-in ceremony took place on Sunday, January 20, 1985, at the White House, followed by a public inauguration ceremony on Monday, January 21, 1985, at the Capitol's rotunda. At 73 years, 349 days of age on Inauguration Day, Reagan was the oldest U.S. president to be inaugurated until Joe Biden's inauguration in 2021, at the age of 78 years, 61 days.

Ronald Reagan closed his inaugural speech by saying:

one people under God, dedicated to the dream of freedom that He has placed in the human heart, called upon now to pass that dream on to a waiting and hopeful world.

== Public inauguration ==
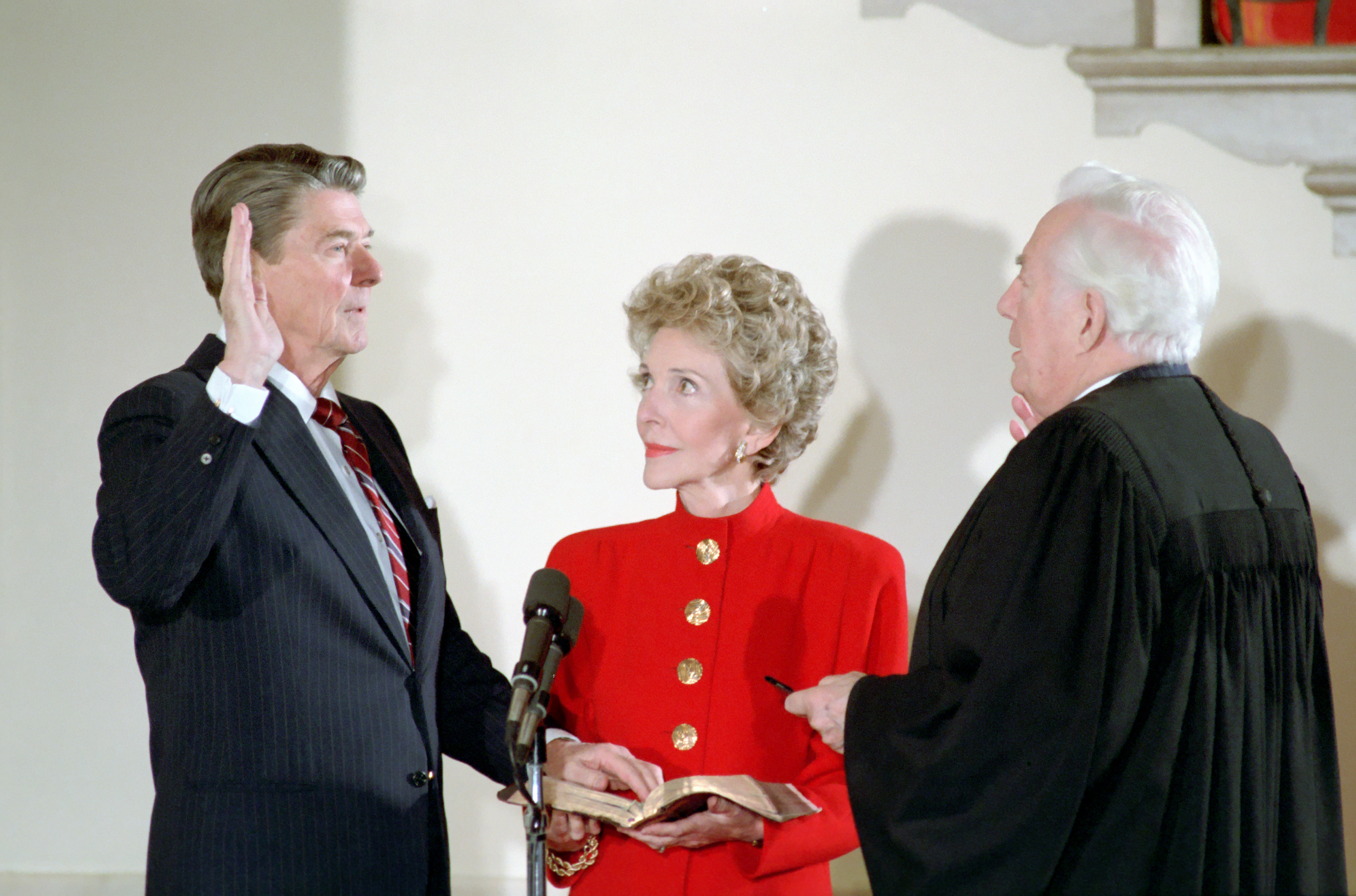
President Reagan is sworn in "privately" on television, January 20, 1985

As the weather outside was harsh, with daytime temperatures of 7 °F (−14 °C) and wind chills of −25 °F (−32 °C), the event organizers were forced to move the public inaugural ceremony, which had been planned for the open air, inside to the Capitol rotunda. (Note: Forty years later, Donald Trump's second inauguration was also moved inside to the rotunda for the same reason.)

Jessye Norman sang Simple Gifts from Aaron Copland's Old American Songs. As had officially happened the day before, Chief Justice Warren E. Burger administered the presidential oath of office to Reagan, and former Associate Justice Potter Stewart administered the vice-presidential oath to Bush. Following Reagan's inaugural address and the pronunciation of the benediction by Peter J. Gomes, the United States Marine Band played The Star-Spangled Banner.

The weather necessitated that the outdoor parade be canceled. A replacement event was held in the Capital Centre.

Coverage of the inauguration was provided throughout the United States by NBC, CBS, ABC, and CNN.

== Inauguration committee ==
Former UPI correspondent John Chambers, son of Whittaker Chambers, served as executive director of the Joint Congressional Committee on the Presidential Inauguration, for Reagan's second inauguration and again for the first inauguration of Bill Clinton in 1993.

== Aftermath ==
On May 27, 1985 (Memorial Day), twenty of the more than fifty high school marching bands that had been scheduled to perform in the cancelled inaugural parade performed in the President's Inaugural Bands Parade held at Walt Disney World's EPCOT Center theme park. The performance was preceded by a speech delivered by President Reagan.

== See also ==
- Presidency of Ronald Reagan
- First inauguration of Ronald Reagan
- 1984 United States presidential election
- Ronald Reagan 1984 presidential campaign
- 1985 White House intrusion
