= Chester Plummer =

1976 White House invader (1945–1976)

Chester Maurice Plummer, Jr.
- Born: December 13, 1945
- Died: July 25, 1976 (aged 30); Washington, D.C., U.S.
- Occupation: Taxi driver
- Known for: Attempting to invade the White House

Chester Maurice Plummer, Jr. (December 13, 1945 – July 25, 1976) was a taxi driver in the Washington, D.C. area of the United States who was shot and killed while attempting to invade the White House.

Plummer was one of nine children born to Chester Maurice Plummer, Sr. and Christine Elizabeth (nee Maxwell) Plummer. He attended high school in Washington, D.C., where he played football.

At about 9:30 p.m. on July 25, 1976, Plummer scaled the White House fence, armed with a piece of pipe. While advancing towards the White House, he was ordered to stop by a Secret Service officer. After ignoring the order, he was shot by a rookie officer, and died 90 minutes later in hospital. He was the first known shooting victim on White House grounds. It is unknown whether Plummer intended to attack President Gerald Ford or had another motive.

Plummer was a decorated Army veteran and former high school football star who had recently undergone a divorce and a separation from another relationship. He was on one year's probation for an indecent exposure charge at the time of his death and a psychiatrist had posited he had impulsivity issues stemming from marital problems. His father had also pressed assault charges against him in 1972 and then dropped them. His employer said he was "apolitical" and "quiet". Co-workers described him as "nice" and "quiet," and one of them felt Chester Plummer may have been looking for a way to commit suicide. His father said he felt favorably toward President Ford. His was the fifth major intrusion onto White House grounds during Ford's presidency. President Ford was in the White House at the time Plummer was shot.

His remains were interred at the Forest Hills Memorial Gardens in Clinton, Maryland.

== See also ==
- Guard Kills Intruder on White House Lawn, The Miami News, July 26, 1976.
- Intruder's Motive Still a Mystery, The Palm Beach Post, July 27, 1976.
- Nice Guy Killed at White House, The Evening Independent, July 26, 1976.
