= 2023 Lafayette Square U-Haul crash =

2023 vehicle-ramming attack and failed terrorist attempt

- Location: 38°54′0″N 77°2′11″W; Lafayette Square, Washington, D.C., United States
- Date: May 22, 2023; 3 years ago 9:35 p.m. (EDT)
- Target: President Joe Biden or Vice President Kamala Harris
- Attack type: Vehicle-ramming attack
- Weapon: U-Haul Ford F-650 truck (with Nova Scotia Venture)
- Deaths: 0
- Injuries: 0
- Perpetrator: Sai Varshith Kandula

On May 22, 2023, a U-Haul truck crashed into the north barriers of Lafayette Square in Washington, D.C. The driver, Sai Varshith Kandula, unfurled a Nazi flag after the crash, telling Secret Service agents that his goal was to "get to the White House, seize power and be put in charge of the nation", indicating he would kill the President if necessary to achieve his goals. He pleaded guilty to one charge of depredation of government property in 2024 and was sentenced to eight years in prison on January 16, 2025.

== Incident ==
At approximately 9:35 p.m. EDT on May 22, 2023, a 26-foot U-Haul truck collided with barriers located on the north side of Lafayette Square, on the intersection of H Street and the Black Lives Matter Plaza (16th Street NW). The truck then slammed into them again before the driver pulled out a backpack and a flag of the Nazi swastika from the back of the truck. A bystander noted that the hood of the vehicle was "smoking" and its undercarriage was leaking.

At 9:40 p.m., the District of Columbia Fire and Emergency Medical Services Department was summoned. The Secret Service evacuated the nearby Hay–Adams Hotel and searched it as a precaution. The evacuation order was lifted at 1:00 a.m. A remote-controlled robot opened the back of the truck, finding only a hand truck. No fatalities or injuries were reported. Neither President Joe Biden nor Vice President Kamala Harris were reported to be in danger.

== Investigation ==
The National Capital Response Squad of the Federal Bureau of Investigation (FBI), Park Police, and Secret Service investigated the incident.

The suspect was identified as Sai Varshith Kandula (born 2003/2004) of Chanda Nagar, India, who lived in Chesterfield, Missouri at the time of the attack. According to an affidavit, he intended to seize power. The affidavit stated that Kandula purchased a one-way ticket and flew from St. Louis Lambert International Airport to Dulles International Airport. He arrived at 8:00 p.m. on May 22 and rented the U-Haul truck in Herndon, Virginia. Kandula admired the Nazis, specifically their "authoritarian nature, eugenics and their one world order", and looked up to Adolf Hitler. Kandula graduated early from Marquette High School in January 2022 and was a member of the school's student council and its boys' tennis team, according to the Rockwood School District. He was charged with assault with a dangerous weapon, reckless operation of a motor vehicle, threatening to kill or kidnap or harm a president, vice president or family member, the destruction of federal property, and trespassing by the Park Police; and depredation of property by the Secret Service. The home of Kandula's parents was searched by the FBI's Evidence Response Team the following day.

In an initial hearing, Kandula's friend and a fellow member of the track team, Errion Barfield, wrote that he "wouldn't hurt a fly" yet would wear a surgical mask bearing Biden's name to provoke a reaction, adding that he intended to major in computer science. Barfield stated that Kandula didn't appear to be suffering from mental illness. A prosecutor said that he was not a citizen of the United States. The Department of Justice later confirmed to ABC News that he had a green card. Kandula was denied bond at a federal court hearing on June 9, 2023, and a preliminary hearing was set for July 13.

On May 13, 2024, Kandula pleaded guilty to one count of depredation of government property, which carries a maximum sentence of 10 years. Prosecutors recommended a prison sentence of 8 years in the plea agreement. Kandula's attorney indicated that he had been diagnosed with schizophrenia by two psychologists, and that Kandula was taking medication to treat this, with a specialist ready to testify at his sentencing. On January 16, 2025, he was sentenced to eight years in federal prison, with an additional three years of supervised release, and ordered to pay nearly $57,000 in restitution. Shortly after his sentencing, he was transferred to FCI Allenwood Low, where he is currently serving his sentence.

== Responses ==
Donald Trump Jr. suggested the attack was a false flag and later pointed to Kandula's Indian origin, writing, "If the threat of white supremacy is so real, why do they have to outsource all the hate?" Conspiracy theories about the attack began spreading on Twitter from verified accounts, with some theories connecting the attack to the disappearance of a 30-ton shipment of explosive chemicals and the Patriot Front march onto the National Mall earlier that month. President Biden was briefed on the attack and was "relieved no one was injured" and "grateful to the agents and the law enforcement officer who responded so quickly".

== See also ==
- List of White House security breaches
