= David Mahonski =

David Allen Mahonski
- Born: May 27, 1958
- Died: November 28, 1992 (aged 34)
- Occupation: Electrician

David Allen Mahonski (May 27, 1958 – November 28, 1992) was an electrician from Williamsport, Pennsylvania, who was shot by a White House guard on March 15, 1984.^{[a]} The 25-year-old had been under FBI surveillance for making threats against then-president Ronald Reagan. He had been warned to stay away from the White House by United States Secret Service officers in the months leading up to the shooting.

== Background ==
Mahonski lived in Williamsport throughout most of his life. Just a few years before the shooting, Mahonski had been released from prison following a March 1979 shooting when he drew a 16-gauge shotgun in front of a Secret Service officer outside the Executive Mansion before being shot by the officer seconds later. He was released from prison in January 1980 before becoming a maintenance mechanic at Stroehmann Bakery in Williamsport for several years until March 1983.

== Shooting ==
Mahonski, who was recovering from his injuries, was noticed in front of the south grounds of the White House by security agents who then approached him. He pulled a sawed-off shotgun from beneath his coat, and one of the agents shot him in the arm with a revolver. He was subsequently arrested.

He was arraigned on March 16, and scheduled for a psychiatric evaluation which later detected 'emotional problems.'

== Notes ==
1. ^{a} - Many later sources have given the date of the shooting as March 3 (e.g.,). However news reports at the time indicate it took place on March 15.
