= 1985 White House intrusion =

Unlawful entry into the White House mansion by an uninvited individual

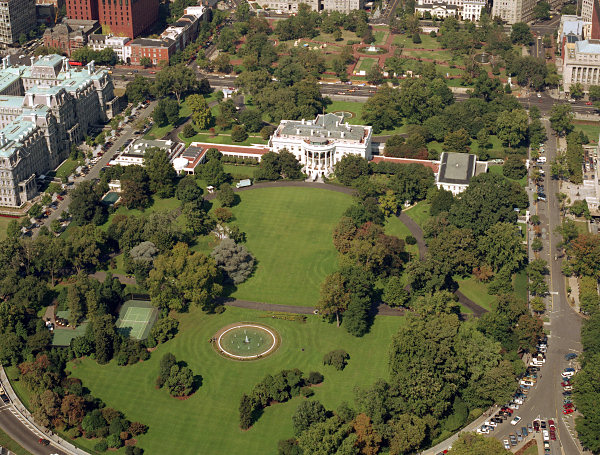
- The White House and grounds in 1984
- Location: The White House; Washington, D.C., U.S.
- Date: January 20, 1985
- Perpetrator: Robert Latta

The 1985 White House intrusion occurred on January 20, 1985 when Robert Allen Latta, a 45-year-old water meter reader, successfully entered the White House uninvited.

== Background ==
Latta, of Denver, Colorado, held a master's degree in mechanical engineering and worked as a water meter reader for the Denver water department, where he held the Denver meter-reading record of 600 readings in a single day. Time magazine quoted his supervisor as saying "He is a phenomenon of accuracy and speed."

== Intrusion ==
While on vacation in Washington, D.C., on January 20, 1985 (the day that President Ronald Reagan was sworn in for his second term) Latta gained access to the White House by following the 33 members of the Marine Band past security. While carrying an overnight bag, he was able to wander around the Executive Residence for 14 minutes, but was eventually discovered near the Blue Room and was apprehended by Secret Service agents, who noticed that he had neither a uniform nor an instrument. Latta reportedly did not know he was doing anything illegal, and was quoted as saying "I thought if I wasn't supposed to be there, somebody would stop me" and that "I just wanted to see the ceremony...I'm kind of patriotic."

== Aftermath ==
Secret Service agents brought in dogs to search for explosives and interrogated Latta outside the White House. Later Latta was turned over to the Metropolitan Police Department of the District of Columbia and charged with a misdemeanor count of unlawful entry. Latta was jailed for five days and interviewed by court-appointed psychiatrist Dr. Norman L. Wilson, who discovered that Latta had voluntarily committed himself to a psychiatric hospital in June 1984 and heard voices saying, "You blew it," according to documents filed in the District of Columbia Superior Court. Latta was committed to St. Elizabeths Hospital.

Wilson recommended further psychiatric study of Latta and a hearing commissioner on January 21 ordered Latta to undergo mental evaluation, but that order was not received by city psychiatrists until three days later, several hours after he had posted bond on $1,000 bail. Latta was quoted as saying the intrusion was "a mistake" but also "the high point of being in Washington" and that "I just wanted to see how far I could get." The unlawful entry had a maximum penalty of six months in jail, but because it was only a misdemeanor, Washington, D.C., prosecutors could not extradite him from Colorado if he did not return voluntarily.

Latta was arrested May 7, 1985, after he failed to show up for a court appearance in Washington, D.C., but was released on personal recognizance after Magistrate Judge Donald E. Abram of the United States District Court for the District of Colorado set a hearing on whether he should be returned to Washington, D.C., to face charges.

== In popular culture ==
Comedian Rich Hall regularly imitated Latta as part of his comedy routine on Saturday Night Live in 1985.

== See also ==
- List of White House security breaches
