= Gerald Gainous =

White House intruder

Gerald Bryan Gainous Jr. (born c.1951) was a resident of Washington D.C., who gained national attention for climbing the fence surrounding the White House four times in 1975 and 1976 during the Gerald Ford administration.

In the first incident, which occurred November 26, 1975, Gainous was able to walk about the grounds without being stopped for about 90 minutes. He approached the President's daughter, Susan Ford, as she was unloading camera equipment from her car, before carrying on. He was freed on probation after that incident.

Gainous claimed he was trying to gain the President's attention in order to obtain a pardon for his father, who had been convicted of conspiring to import heroin.
