= Dennis Kirk =

American political operative (born 1950/1951)

Inspector General of the Department of the Interior
- Nominee
- Assuming office TBD
- President: Donald Trump
- Succeeding: Mark Greenblatt

Personal details
- Born: Dennis Dean Kirk; 1950 or 1951 (age 75–76)
- Education: Washburn University (JD)

Dennis Dean Kirk (born 1950 or 1951) is an American political operative and attorney.

== Early life and education (1950/1951–1975) ==
Dennis Dean Kirk was born in 1950 or 1951. Kirk graduated from Pittsburg High School and Northern Arizona University. He attended the Washburn University School of Law. In May 1974, Kirk was hired as an intern in the Sedgwick County district attorney's office. He was admitted to the bar in September 1975.

== Career ==
=== Law career (1975–2018) ===
By July 1976, Kirk had been working as an attorney at the Interstate Commerce Commission. That month, he married Imelda Koett. Kirk represented Robert Earl, a deputy to Oliver North, amid the Iran–Contra affair. He served as the associate general counsel for strategic integration and business transformation at the Department of the Army in the Bush administration.

=== Merit System Protection Board and Office of Personnel Management (2018–2021) ===
On March 12, 2018, President Donald Trump nominated Kirk to serve as a member and the chair of the Merit Systems Protection Board. Kirk appeared before the Senate Committee on Homeland Security and Governmental Affairs on July 19. The committee voted to advance Kirk's nomination in February 2019. His nomination remained stalled through January 2020; the American Federation of Government Employees opposed Kirk's nomination, citing his lack of experience. His nomination was withdrawn by President Joe Biden.

In April 2020, the Office of Personnel Management announced that it had appointed Kirk as the associate director for employee services. Kirk was involved in implementing Schedule F appointments.

=== Post-government work (2021–2025) ===
By April 2023, Kirk had been hired at The Heritage Foundation as an associate director. He co-authored a section of Project 2025's Mandate for Leadership on the federal workforce.

=== Office of the Inspector General of the Intelligence Community (2025–2026) ===
By May 2025, Tulsi Gabbard, the director of national intelligence, had hired Kirk as an advisor. That month, she named Kirk to the Office of the Inspector General of the Intelligence Community. The decision occurred as the inspector general's office was investigating the Office of the Director of National Intelligence over the unauthorized release of a group chat in which military operations were discussed.

== Office of the Inspector General for the Department of the Interior ==
In August 2026, California representative Jared Huffman, the ranking member of the House Committee on Natural Resources, alleged that Kirk had been hired at the Office of the Inspector General for the United States Department of the Interior. On August 7, President Donald Trump nominated Kirk as the office's inspector general. The nomination occurred as the Office of the Inspector General had been requested to oversee the Department of the Interior's management of Trump's renovations to the Lincoln Memorial Reflecting Pool.
