= MS Prinsendam =

MS Prinsendam may refer to:

- MS Prinsendam (1972), which sank in 1980.
- MS Prinsendam (1988), formerly Royal Viking Sun and Seabourn Sun.
