= D. Brian Peterman =

American Coast Guard admiral

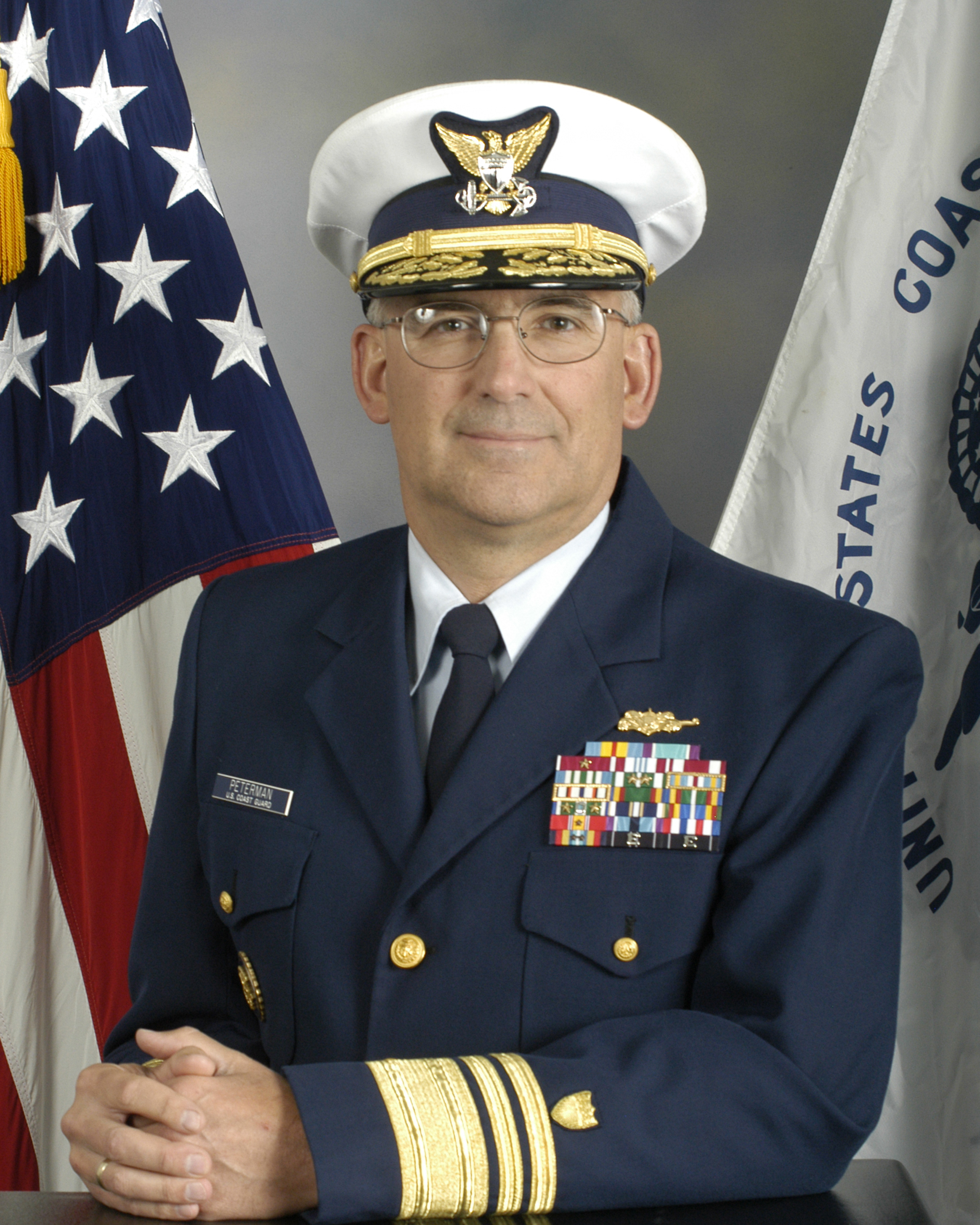
- Died: 3/15/2026
- Allegiance: United States of America
- Branch: Coast Guard
- Service years: 1973 - 2008
- Rank: Vice Admiral
- Commands: Coast Guard Atlantic Area; Commander, Defense Force East; Coast Guard District Seven; USCGC Woodrush; USCGC Campbell
- Conflicts: Cold War; September 11, 2001 attacks
- Awards: Defense Distinguished Service Medal; Coast Guard Distinguished Service Medal; Legion of Merit; Defense Meritorious Service Medal

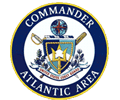

Vice Admiral David Brian Peterman retired in July 2008. Prior to retiring he was Commander, Atlantic Area / Commander, Defense Force East. He assumed command of United States Coast Guard Atlantic Area on May 9, 2006, and was the operational commander for all Coast Guard activities in an area of responsibility east of the Rocky Mountains from Canada to Mexico, across the Atlantic Ocean to the Persian Gulf and throughout the Caribbean Sea. Over 33,000 military and civilian personnel, and 30,000 auxiliarists were under his leadership. He served concurrently as Commander, U.S. Coast Guard Defense Force East. With this change of command, Peterman relieved Vice Admiral Vivien S. Crea.

He reported to the Coast Guard Atlantic Area from an assignment as Commander, Seventh Coast Guard District where he led Coast Guard tactical operations in the Southeastern United States and the Caribbean. Prior to that, he served for two-and-a-half years as the Special Assistant to the President for Border and Transportation Security on the Homeland Security Council staff. This was his second assignment to the White House, having previously served as a Director in the Defense Policy and Arms Control Directorate of the National Security Council from 1998 to 2000.

Vice Admiral Peterman is a Coast Guard Cutterman and commanded two cutters: Coast Guard Cutter WOODRUSH out of Sitka, Alaska, and Coast Guard Cutter CAMPBELL out of New Bedford, Massachusetts In addition, he served aboard Coast Guard Cutter ACHUSHNET out of Gulfport, Miss., and Coast Guard Cutter SWEETBRIER out of Cordova, Alaska.

In addition to his shipboard assignments, Vice Admiral Peterman served in a number of assignments ashore. As the first Coast Guard officer in the Military Liaison Office in Kingston, Jamaica, he trained Jamaica Defense Force personnel for peacekeeping operations in Grenada. From 1988 to 1990, he served at the Headquarters, U.S. European Command in Stuttgart, Germany, where he managed a program that required extensive travel in North and West Africa. Later, he commanded the Coast Guard's key Alaska industrial and operational facility in Ketchikan, Alaska.

Raised in Malvern, Pennsylvania, Vice Admiral Peterman is a 1968 graduate of Great Valley High School, earned a Bachelor of Science Degree from West Chester University in 1972 and entered the Coast Guard through the Officer Candidate program. In 1988 he earned a Master of Science Degree from the Naval War College. His military awards include the Defense Distinguished Service Medal, Coast Guard Distinguished Service Medal, Legion of Merit, Joint Meritorious Service Medal, Cutterman's insignia and the Presidential Service insignia.

== See also ==
- Organization of the United States Coast Guard
