= Command Consulting Group =

International security and intelligence consulting firm

Command Group
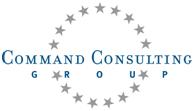
- Industry: Consulting; Government contractor
- Founded: April 2009
- Headquarters: Washington, DC, USA
- Key people: W. Ralph Basham, Founder
- Website: www.commandcg.com

Command Group, "CG", founded as Command Consulting Group, is an international security and intelligence consulting firm, founded in 2009, headquartered in Washington, D.C., United States. CG provides advisory services for governments, corporations, and high net worth individuals.

The firm is mostly made up of career law enforcement, homeland security, military and intelligence officials with U.S. government operational backgrounds, but also includes political appointees from the Clinton, Obama and both Bush administrations.

The firm's expertise lies in macro and micro security issues including: Customs Management and Trade Facilitation, Transportation and Aviation Security, National Security and Intelligence, Medical and Public Health Emergencies, Maritime Security, Safety and Dominance Awareness, Major Events Management, Law Enforcement Training and Integrity Monitoring, Head of State and VIP Security & Operations, Global Supply Chain and Port Security, Emergency Preparation, Response and Recovery, Continuity Planning, Border Security.

== History ==
Command Group was founded in 2009 by W. Ralph Basham, Joe Hagin, Steve Atkiss and Thad Bingel, all former senior officials in the U.S. government.

Basham served as the head of four of the eight operational components which makeup what is now the U.S. Department of Homeland Security, including the United States Secret Service, US Customs and Border Protection, the Transportation Security Administration and the Federal Law Enforcement Training Center.

Command Group principals have been outspoken critics of Boeing Corporation's handling of the Secure Border Initiative Program, SBInet. They have also commented on the 2011 Tucson shooting and how to keep members of Congress and high-net-worth individuals safe.

== Joint Venture ==
Command at Sea International (CASI) is a joint venture of Command Group, created in September 2010 when retired Admiral D. Brian Peterman recognized the market for yacht security. CASI develops customized plans to address the safety and security needs for yachts.

== Clients ==
For confidentiality and operational security reasons, Command Group does not disclose a list of its clients. The firm is known for its security advisory work on behalf of international governments, particularly in Latin America and the Middle East, ultra rich private individuals and heads of state, and for the assistance it provides to companies with security related products and services in helping grow their business.

In rare public reporting on CG's activities, in February, 2011 Government Security News published a story about how CG had been hired by the Government of Haiti to evaluate security at the Port-au-Prince International Airport, provide training to its security forces and recommend improvements to the technology used for screening passengers, baggage and cargo.

CG's only other publicly known client was SMobile Systems, a cyber-security company which focused on provided security software for mobile devices. Smobile Systems was sold to Juniper Networks in the Summer of 2010 for $74 million.

== Principals ==
- Eduardo Aguirre- United States Ambassador to Spain
- Steve Atkiss- Chief of Staff at U.S. Customs and Border Protection, Special Assistant to the President for Operations at the White House
- W. Ralph Basham- Former Commissioner of U.S. Customs and Border Protection, 21st director of the United States Secret Service, Chief of Staff of the Transportation Security Administration, Director of the Federal Law Enforcement Training Center
- Thad Bingel- Chief of Staff and Assistant Commissioner for Congressional Affairs at U.S. Customs and Border Protection
- Bruce Bowen- Deputy Director of the United States Secret Service, assistant director of the Federal Law Enforcement Training Center
- Michael A. Braun- Chief of Operations at the U.S. Drug Enforcement Administration
- Charlotte Bryan- National Manager for FAA's Aviation Security Regulatory Program
- David W. Carey- Executive Director of U.S. Central Intelligence Agency
- Colonel Ronald Colburn- National Deputy Chief of the U.S. Border Patrol within U.S. Customs and Border Protection
- Dr. Robert G. Darling- First board certified emergency medicine physician selected to serve the President of the United States as White House Physician
- Alfonso Martinez-Fonts Jr.- Assistant Secretary for the Private Sector Office at the U.S. Department of Homeland Security
- Joe Hagin- White House Deputy Chief of Staff for President George W. Bush
- William Houston- Director of Policy and Planning for U.S. Customs and Border Protection
- Dr. Kathleen Kiernan- Assistant Director for the Office of Strategic Intelligence and Information for the Bureau of Alcohol, Tobacco, Firearms and Explosives
- Phil Lago- Central Intelligence Agency (CIA), the National Geospatial-Intelligence Agency (NGA), and the National Security Council (NSC) at the White House
- William Lang- Associate Chief Medical Officer at the U.S. Department of Homeland Security (DHS), Director of the White House Medical Unit and Deputy Physician to the President, Director of Clinical Information Requirements for the U.S. Department of Defense
- Jan Lesher- Chief of Staff for Operations at the Department of Homeland Security under Secretary Janet Napolitano, Chief of Staff to the Governor of Arizona
- Dennis Lindsay- Director of Aviation Operations, executive director of Air and Marine Operations at U.S. Customs and Border Protection
- Chester F. Lunner- Deputy Under Secretary for the Office of Intelligence and Analysis (OIA) at the Department of Homeland Security (DHS)
- Edward J. Marinzel- Deputy Assistant Director of the United States Secret Service (USSS) Office of Protective Operations, Special Agent in Charge of the Presidential Protective Division
- William Masters- United States Secret Service Armored Vehicle Program Manager
- Mo McGowan- Assistant Administrator for the Office of Security Operations at (TSA)
- Peter McNall- Director of Air Operations for the Unmanned Aerial Surveillance program for U.S. Customs and Border Protection and the U.S Department of Homeland Security
- Charles E. McQueary- Director, Operational Test & Evaluation (DOT&E) with the Office of the Secretary of Defense (SecDef) at the U.S. Department of Defense (DoD), Under Secretary for Science & Technology in the U.S. Department of Homeland Security (DHS)
- R. David Paulison- Administrator of the Federal Emergency Management Agency, Administrator of the United States Fire Administration, Director of Preparedness at FEMA, Fire Chief and Emergency Management Director of Miami-Dade County
- D. Brian Peterman- Atlantic Area U.S. Coast Guard Commander, Commander of U.S. Coast Guard District Seven, Principal Federal Official (PFO) for Hurricane Ophelia, Director in the Defense Policy and Arms Control staff on the White House National Security Council during the Clinton Administration, Special Assistant to the President for Border and Transportation Security at the Homeland Security Council under George W. Bush
- Michael Petrucelli- Acting Director of U.S. Citizenship and Immigration Services (USCIS), Senior Vice President for Operations and Chief of Staff of the Export-Import Bank of the United States
- Mike Restovich- U.S. Department of Homeland Security Attaché at the U.S. Embassy in London
- Mark Tillman- Commander of the United States Presidential Airlift Group (PAG) and Chief Pilot of Air Force One
- Harold Douglas Wankel- Director of the Counter Narcotics Task Force (CNTF) at the United States Embassy in Kabul, Afghanistan,
- Jon Whittingham- Director of Security and Technical Surveillance Countermeasures Program Manager, White House Communications Agency
- Paul D. Irving- served as senior security consultant at the firm prior to becoming Sergeant at Arms of the United States House of Representatives
