= Steve Atkiss =

American government official

Steve Atkiss is a former US Government official who is a Principal at Command Consulting Group, a homeland and national security advisory firm based in Washington, DC, USA.

Atkiss served in U.S. Customs and Border Protection, the largest law enforcement agency in the United States as Chief of Staff. He is most well known for his involvement in the effort to build CBP's intelligence capabilities.

Atkiss also served at the White House as Special Assistant to the President for Operations in the Chief of Staff’s Office. His office in the West Wing was approximately 25 feet from the Oval Office and Atkiss accompanied the President on most trips in the United States and internationally.

A native of Dallas, Texas, Atkiss received his bachelor's degree from University of Florida. He also attended programs at the George Washington University Graduate School of Political Management and Institute for International Mediation and Conflict Resolution.

== Career ==
As Chief of Staff at U.S. Customs and Border Protection Atkiss worked closely with Commissioner W. Ralph Basham on issues such as border security, international affairs, and management among others.

Prior to his work for U.S. Customs & Border Protection, Atkiss served as Special Assistant to the President for Operations in the Chief of Staff’s Office at the White House. In this position Atkiss coordinated civilian, military, and law enforcement activities.

Atkiss also served as Special Assistant to the President and Deputy Director of Advance, where he was responsible for planning and executing travel and events for the President.

Atkiss has worked in management and administration, information systems and technology, human resources, budget, continuity of government programs, military support and security.
