= Eljay B. Bowron =

18th Director of the United States Secret Service

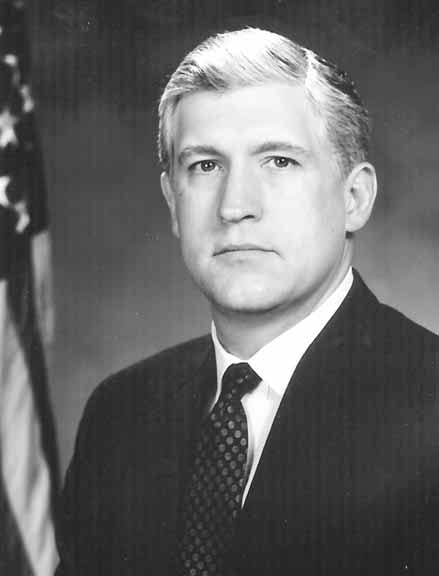

18th Director of the United States Secret Service
- In office December 7, 1993 – April 2, 1997
- President: Bill Clinton
- Preceded by: John Magaw
- Succeeded by: Lewis C. Merletti

Inspector General of the Department of the Interior
- In office November 2, 1998 – March 29, 1999
- President: Bill Clinton
- Preceded by: Richard Reback (Acting)
- Succeeded by: Robert J. Williams (Acting)

Personal details
- Born: January 2, 1951 (age 75) Detroit, Michigan, U.S.
- Party: Non-partisan
- Education: Michigan State University

Eljay B. Bowron (born January 2, 1951) is an American law enforcement officer and secret service agent who served as the 18th Director of the United States Secret Service from 1993 to 1997.

== Early life and education ==
Bowron was born in Detroit, Michigan on January 2, 1951. He graduated from Michigan State University in 1973 after having received a bachelor of science degree in criminal justice. He is married to Sandy Bowron and has a son, Brandon.

== Career ==
Bowron began his career in law enforcement as an officer with the Detroit Police Department, before joining the secret service in 1974. He worked as a special agent in the Chicago field office and was primarily assigned to combatting counterfeiting and financial crimes, serving in the Secret Service's intelligence division. Bowron further held special agent positions and assignments in Miami, Houston, Atlanta, and Washington, D.C.. He attended the George Washington University’s School of Government and Business Administration Contemporary Executive Development Program, in 1988.

Bowron was appointed as the 18th Director of the United States Secret Service on December 7, 1993, by President Bill Clinton. Bowron held this position until his resignation on April 2, 1997, following his decision to join Ameritech. Of his performance, President Clinton remarked: "Eljay Bowron has done a superb job as Director of the United States Secret Service, and I am accepting his resignation with regret. I have great admiration for what he has accomplished during his service to our country."

Bowron briefly served as deputy inspector general of the Social Security Administration, before entering public service again when he became assistant comptroller general in the Office of Special Investigations of the General Accounting Office, in October 1997. Bowron was nominated that following year by President Clinton to be the next Inspector General of the Department of the Interior. He was confirmed by the Senate by Voice Vote on October 21, 1998, and took office the following month. He maintained his position until March 29, 1999.

== Later life ==
After leaving government service, Bowron became the Executive Vice President and Chief Operating Officer of Vance International, a position he held until 2003. Bowron is also the Chairman and Co-Founder of TorchStone Global. He moved from his residence in Northern Virginia, to Naples, Florida, where he still resides.

Political offices
Preceded by John Magaw	Director of the United States Secret Service; 1993–1997	Succeeded by Lewis C. Merletti
