= Lewis C. Merletti =

Former Director of the United States Secret Service

Lewis Carlo Merletti
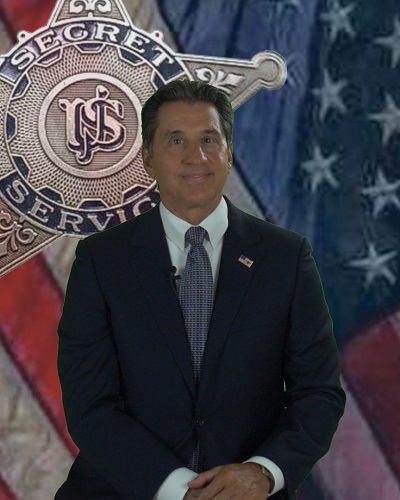

19th Director of the United States Secret Service
- In office June 6, 1997 – March 3, 1999
- President: Bill Clinton
- Preceded by: Eljay B. Bowron
- Succeeded by: Brian L. Stafford

Personal details
- Born: July 1, 1948 (age 78) Pittsburgh, Pennsylvania, U.S.
- Children: Mike Merletti, Matt Merletti
- Website: https://ashwood-rms.com/

Lewis Carlo Merletti (born July 1, 1948) was the 19th Director of the United States Secret Service. He succeeded Eljay B. Bowron, and was sworn in on June 6, 1997, by the Secretary of the Treasury Robert Rubin. A 25-year veteran of the United States Secret Service, Merletti has also served as Assistant Director in the Office of Training, and as the Special Agent in Charge of the Presidential Protection Division.

== Education ==
Merletti was born in Pittsburgh, Pennsylvania on July 1, 1948. He attended Central Catholic High School and Duquesne University, in Pittsburgh, Pennsylvania, where he received a B.A. degree in political science. He also completed George Washington University Contemporary Executive Development Course, Senior Executive Service Training.

Military Courses

Merletti completed Basic, Advanced Infantry Training (AIT), Jump School, and Special Forces Training Phases I and II of US Special Forces Tactics and Techniques Training. He completed 42 weeks of intense Special Forces MOS Medic training. He attended and graduated from the Special Forces Vietnamese language training course with limited fluency skills. His MOS training prior to Special Forces was light weapons, 11B.

Federal and Government Courses

During his time in the Secret Service, he completed Special Agent Criminal Investigator Training; Polygraph Examiner School; Counter Assault Team Training Course; Leadership Development Program and Followup (at the Center for Creative Leadership); Negotiating Skills for Executives; and George Washington Contemporary Executive Development.

== Military service ==
Merletti enlisted in the United States Army in 1967. He served for three years, including a tour of duty as a Special Forces medic in Vietnam with the 5th Special Forces Group, A-502, Airborne. He earned numerous military honors including the Bronze Star, Certificate of Achievement of Meritorious Performance, Combat Medical Badge, Good Conduct Medal, and Parachute Wings.

He then transitioned from a decorated combat medic to his later roles as a Secret Service Agent.

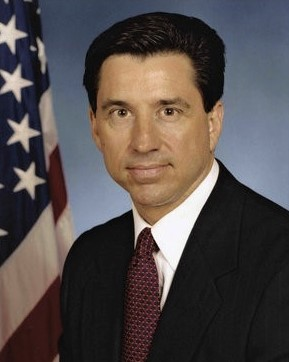
Merletti as Secret Service Director

== Career with the United States Secret Service ==
In 1974, Merletti joined the Secret Service as a special agent assigned to the Philadelphia Field Office later transferred to the New York City Field Office. In 1982, Merletti was transferred to The Office of Protective Operations in Washington DC. He volunteered for the newly established United States Secret Service’s Counter Assault Team (CAT). He completed training and received his designated CAT Operator Number in May 1982. CAT is a specialized tactical unit of the Secret Service, providing tactical support to the Presidential Protective Division; specializing in counter-ambush tactics and close-quarters combat (CQB).

On April 29, 1993, The United States Department of the Treasury's Secretary Lloyd Benson and Assistant Secretary Of The Treasury for the Office of Enforcement, Ronald K. Noble, announced its plans to examine the Bureau of Alcohol Tobacco and Firearm's (ATF) execution of search and arrest warrants for David Koresh and other Branch Davidians at their compound near Waco, Texas on February 28, 1993. Benson and Noble selected Merletti, then the Secret Service's Deputy Assistant Director, as the "Assistant Project Director" to oversee the investigative team charged with the analysis and assessment of whether ATF's procedures, policies, and practices were adequate and whether they were followed up until the time ATF decided to raid the compound. The review "Report of The Department of the Treasury on the Bureau of Alcohol, Tobacco, and Firearms, Investigation of Vernon Wayne Howell also known as David Koresh" of the incident was assessed as being extensively and "brutally detailed" and a "biting review" of the incident. Merletti also defended this document to the Joint House Subcommittee regarding the Waco investigation. The overall report and his response to this was widely considered a courageous and candid evaluation of the events that took place.

Throughout his tenure with the agency he served for Presidents Gerald Ford, Jimmy Carter, Ronald Reagan, George H. W. Bush, and Bill Clinton. He also held the position of Special Agent in Charge of Presidential protection during the Clinton Administration, which made him responsible for the physical security of the President and First Family. He was also in charge of supervising security arrangements for Presidential visits to dangerous high security environments including Israel, Syria, Kuwait, and Saudi Arabia during Operation Desert Shield.

In 1997, Lew worked with Richard A. Clarke of the National Security Council to amend Presidential Decision Directive number 39 (PDD-39) to elevate the Secret Service to the lead federal agency for the operational planning for events declared to be National Special Security Event(NSSE). President Clinton formalized this directive in May 1998 as PPD-62.

Following his time in the Secret Service, he has remained connected to the military and Secret Service. In October 2017 and again in September 2018, Merletti gave presentations in North Carolina, at Fort Bragg's JFK Center for the Special Warfare Non-commissioned Officers Academy highlighting his Special Forces training and experiences, and how he applied that training and experience to the United States Secret Service. Other co-presenters for the event included retired Special Forces legends Billy Waugh and Felix Rodriguez.

Merletti, along with Waugh, is currently a regular guest lecturer for various Special Forces basic and advanced courses. Both are highlighted in best selling author Annie Jacobsen's book Surprise, Kill, Vanish: The Secret History of CIA Paramilitary Armies, Operators, and Assassins In March 2019, Merletti was the Keynote Speaker for the United States Secret Service's Counter Assault Team graduating class.

The 2020 Book: "They Were Soldiers" by Joseph L. Galloway and Marvin Wolf describes the contribution that Merletti made as an officeholder following his initial service as a Vietnam veteran who returned home from the "lost war".

On April 8, 2025, Merletti delivered the eulogy at the Washington National Cathedral in Washington, DC, for Clint Hill, the Secret Service agent who shielded Jackie and President John F. Kennedy from further gunfire in Dallas.

== Clinton trial ==
During the Clinton impeachment trial in 1998, while Merletti was Director of the Secret Service, independent counsel Kenneth W. Starr's prosecutors requested that numerous Secret Service agents testify in the investigation of President Clinton's relationship with Monica Lewinsky. "Merletti argued strongly against this, saying "As law enforcement officers, Secret Service agents would proactively report any crime that they witnessed, however, Secret Service agents assigned to the Presidential Protective Detail should not be subpoenaed as part of a 'fishing expedition.' It is my firm belief, as Director of the United States Secret Service, that using Secret Service protective personnel as witnesses concerning non-criminal activities of a President will substantially undermine, if not destroy, the relationship of trust and confidence that must exist between the Secret Service and the President in order for the Secret Service to successfully fulfill its mission. If our Presidents do not have complete trust in the Secret Service personnel who protect them, they may push away the Service's "protective envelope," thereby making them more vulnerable to assassination."

On May 22, Chief U.S. District Judge Norma Holloway Johnson ruled that since the Secret Service employees are part of the federal law enforcement establishment sworn to assist in criminal investigations, they must testify. The Secret Service appealed her decision and the case eventually made its way to the Supreme Court where the Secret Service lost in a split decision. Scores of Secret Service agents then testified before Starr's Independent Counsel. In the end, Starr and his Independent Counsel were frustrated to learn that the rumor and innuendo that they had been led to believe regarding the Secret Service's involvement with the Lewinsky issue was totally unfounded. The Independent Counsel remarked that the Secret Service turned out to be "a dry well." Merletti felt vindicated and remarked, "It was the fight that mattered, future Presidents would have faith in the Secret Service's motto of being 'Worthy of trust and confidence'." [10/17/2007 statement by United States Secret Service Director Lewis C. Merletti]

== Cleveland Browns & NFL ==
=== Cleveland Browns ===
Merletti was the Senior Vice President for Security for the Cleveland Browns under Lerner ownership (1999-2011). He was responsible for all operations to include disaster recovery; the direction, design and deployment of security for the entire Cleveland Browns operation, including the owners, coaches, players, and public safety on game days at the Cleveland Browns Stadium.

From 1999 until 2011 Merletti was in charge of full background investigations on collegiate prospects for draft years 1999 – 2011. Conducted one on one personal interviews with those players selected for potential draft picks for the Cleveland Browns. Also conducted one on one personal interviews with players selected for the East-West Shrine Game, and the Senior Bowl.

December 2009: Following the dismissal of the Cleveland Browns General Manager, Merletti and Dawn Aponte were designated by team owner Randy Lerner to handle all aspects of the Browns General Manager responsibilities. Their December 2009 GM record resulted in “4” wins and “0” losses for the Browns; an undefeated record for the last four games of the Browns’ 2009 season.

=== National Football League (NFL) ===
Following the September 11, 2001 attacks, Merletti was a primary driver in having the United States Secret Service designate that year's Super Bowl XXXVI in New Orleans as a National Security Special Event (NSSE) resulting in the Secret Service providing the protection plan as well as the physical protection. At the request of the NFL, Merletti was appointed as a newly established NFL Security Advisor and developed security practices for all NFL stadiums. Those criteria are still in place and considered the standard for security practices at all the NFL stadiums.

== Other Private sector work ==
Merletti currently serves on the following corporate boards in private industry:

- SureFire – Advisory Board Member
- Digital Global Systems (DGS) – Advisory Board Member
- Ashwood Risk Management Solutions (RMS), – Active Advisor for the private security firm based in Ohio.

== Personal life ==
Lew is married to Josette Merletti, formerly a nurse with the Cleveland Clinic.

His son Mike was in the United States Army, an Airborne Ranger Captain who served with the 101st Airborne Division, with combat tours in Iraq and Afghanistan.

His son Matt played Safety for the University of North Carolina-Chapel Hill football team. He also played for a brief stint in the NFL with the Indianapolis Colts.
