= USCGC Sweetbrier =

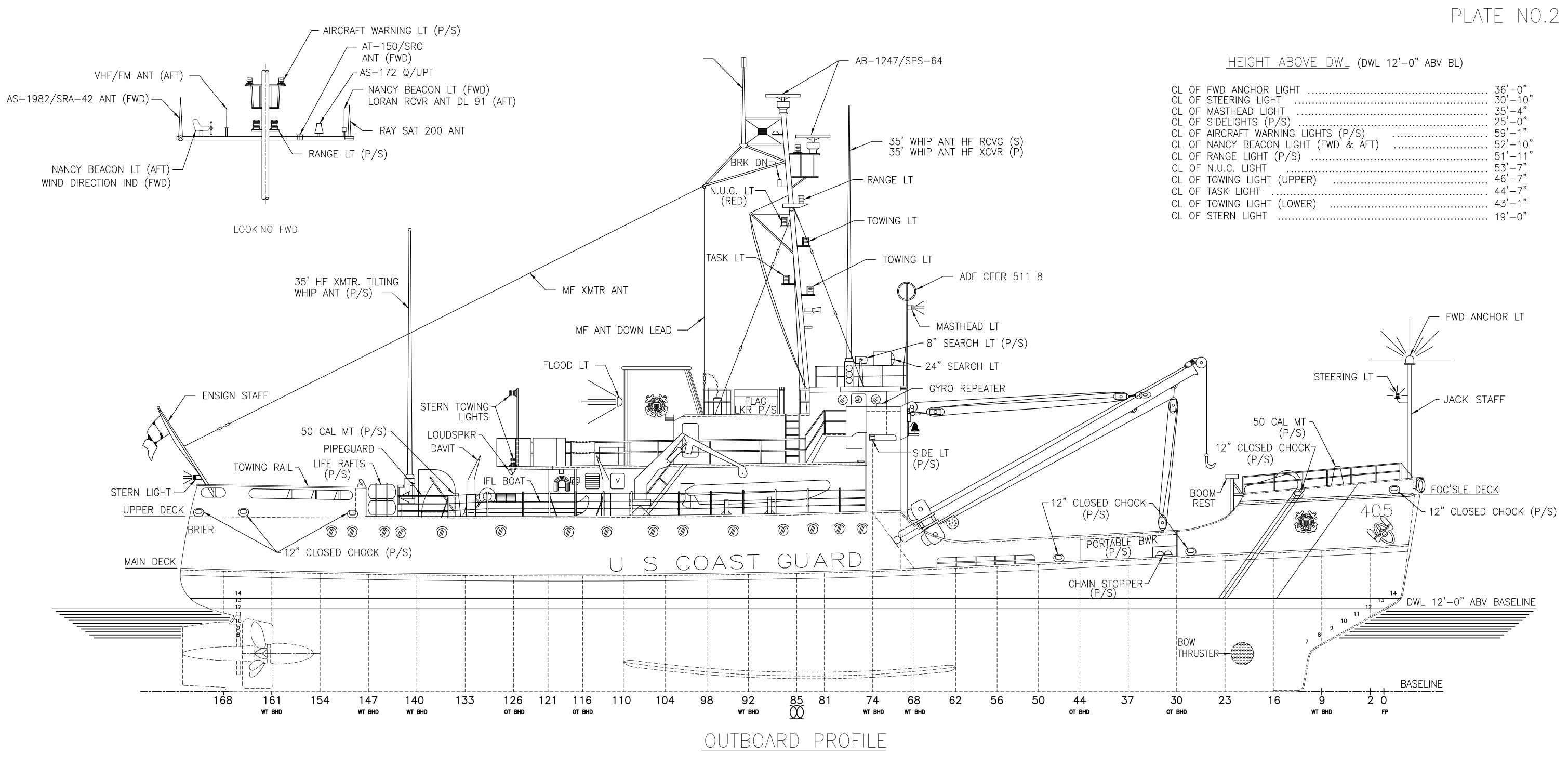
- USCGC Sweetbrier as she appeared in 1993

History

United States
- Name: USCGC Sweetbrier
- Builder: Marine Iron and Shipbuilding Company, Duluth, Minnesota
- Cost: $865,531
- Laid down: 3 November 1943
- Launched: 30 December 1943
- Commissioned: 26 July 1944
- Decommissioned: 27 August 2001
- Identification: Signal letters NODX
- Fate: Transferred to Ghana Navy

Ghana
- Name: GNS Bonsu
- Acquired: 26 October 2001
- Identification: MMSI 627400501; Callsign 9GYM

General characteristics as built in 1943
- Class & type: Iris-class buoy tender
- Displacement: 935 tons
- Length: 180 ft (55 m)
- Beam: 37 ft (11 m)
- Draft: 12 feet (3.7 m)
- Propulsion: 2 × Cooper-Bessemer GND-8 Diesel engines
- Speed: 14 kn (26 km/h; 16 mph) maximum
- Range: 8,000 nmi (15,000 km; 9,200 mi) at 13 kn (24 km/h; 15 mph)
- Complement: 6 officers, 74 enlisted men
- Armament: 2 x 20 mm guns; 3 in (76 mm)/50 gun

The USCGC Sweetbrier (WAGL-405/WLB-405) was an Iris-class 180-foot seagoing buoy tender operated by the United States Coast Guard. She served in the Pacific during World War II. Her entire post-war career with the Coast Guard was spent in Alaska. After she was decommissioned in 2001, she was transferred to the Ghana Navy and renamed Bonsu. She is still active.

== Construction and characteristics ==
Sweetbrier was built at the Marine Iron and Shipbuilding Company in Duluth, Minnesota. Her keel was laid down on 3 November 1943, she was launched on 30 December 1943, and she was commissioned on 26 July 1944. Her original cost was $865,531.

Her hull was constructed of welded steel plates framed with steel I-beams. As originally built, Sweetbrier was 180 feet (55 m) long, with a beam of 37 feet (11 m), and a draft of 12 feet (3.7 m). Her displacement was 935 tons. While her overall dimensions remained the same over her career, the addition of new equipment raised her displacement to 1,025 tons by the end of her Coast Guard service.

She was designed to perform light ice-breaking. Her hull was reinforced with an "ice belt" of thicker steel around her waterline to protect it from punctures. Similarly, her bow was reinforced and shaped to ride over ice in order to crush it with the weight of the ship.

Sweetbrier had a single 5-blade propeller 8.5 feet (2.6 m) in diameter. It was driven by a diesel-electric propulsion system. Two Cooper-Bessemer GND-8 4-cycle 8-cylinder Diesel engines produced 600 horsepower each. They provided power to two Westinghouse generators. The electricity from the generators ran an electric motor which turned the propeller.

She had a single cargo boom which had the ability to lift 20 tons onto her buoy deck.

The ship's fuel tanks had a capacity of approximately 28,875 US gallons (109,300 L). Sweetbrier's unrefueled range was 8,000 nautical miles (15,000 km) at 13 knots, 12,000 nautical miles (22,000 km) at 12 knots, and 17,000 nautical miles (31,000 km) at 8.3 knots. Her potable water tanks had a capacity of 30,499 US gallons (115,450 L). Considering dry storage capacity and other factors, her at-sea endurance was 21 days.

Her wartime complement was 6 officers and 74 enlisted men. By 1964 this was reduced to 5 officers, 2 warrant officers, and 47 enlisted personnel.

Sweetbrier was initially armed with a 3"/50 caliber gun mounted behind the pilot house. She also had two 20mm guns, one mounted on top of the wheelhouse and one on the aft deck. Two racks of depth charges were also mounted on the aft deck. All of her on-deck armament was removed in 1966, leaving only small arms for law enforcement actions.

At the time of construction, Sweetbrier was designated WAGL, an auxiliary vessel, lighthouse tender. The designation was system was changed in 1965, and she was redesignated WLB, an oceangoing buoy tender.

The ship's namesake was the sweetbrier, a species of wild rose widely naturalized in North America.

== World War II service ==
After commissioning, Sweetbrier sailed to the Coast Guard Yard in Curtis Bay, Maryland to have her armament and sensors installed. She arrived there on 31 August 1944 via the St. Lawrence River. After a shakedown cruise, she departed for the west coast via the Panama Canal on 24 October 1944. Her homeport was nominally Eureka, California, but the ship was assigned to the Pacific fleet. After repairs and loading ammunition at Mare Island Naval Shipyard, Sweetbrier sailed for Pearl Harbor, arriving there on 27 February 1945.

Sweetbrier was dispatched across the Pacific to Guam. She arrived at Port Merizo on 30 March 1945. Here, an armed boarding party from Sweetbrier searched the decommissioned battleship USS Oregon for Japanese troops that were rumored to be hiding aboard. They found none. Oregon was anchored there as a floating warehouse. In Guam Sweetbrier was engaged in establishing aids to navigation and fleet mooring buoys, but also assisted several vessels that had grounded in Apra Harbor, including LST-846.

On 27 April 1945 Sweetbrier sailed from Guam as an escort for a small convoy to Okinawa. The convoy was attacked by a Japanese plane on 6 May 1945 and Sweetbrier fired her 3" gun twice before U.S. aircraft shot down the intruder. This began a period when the ship's work was interrupted by a series of air raids. She was credited with shooting down 2 enemy aircraft and assists in downing 8 more at Okinawa. Concern about the air raids was heightened by the cargo of 27,400 pounds of dynamite she embarked of 14 May 1945 to support Seabee blasting operations in the area. This explosive cargo was on board through a number of air raids, including one that hit LST-808 only 500 yards off her port bow. The dynamite was finally offloaded on 25 May 1945.

== Domestic service ==
The end of World War II in 1945 created intense pressure from conscripted members of the armed forces and their families for rapid demobilization. The Coast Guard lost so many sailors that it was forced to decommission several ships for lack of crews to sail them. Sweetbrier returned to Honolulu, Hawaii from Guam in October 1946, and was decommissioned there in 1947 for lack of personnel. USCGC Kukui towed her to Seattle in September 1949. The cutter was recommissioned on 5 May 1950 and sailed for her new home port of Ketchikan, Alaska in June of that year.

Sweetbrier's primary mission at Ketchikan was to maintain aids to navigation in her area. Part of that role was supplying remote lighthouses and LORAN stations along the entire Alaskan coast. For example, in April 1951 Sweetbrier loaded her hold with food and other supplies in Seattle. She made multiple supply stops in Southeast Alaska and all along the Aleutian chain to Attu. She was expected to return to Ketchikan by early July. Sweetbrier supported the Coast Guard's search and rescue mission as well, frequently assisting disabled or grounded vessels in the local fishing fleet. The ship also undertook whatever special missions were requested of her. For example, in March 1952, fire swept away a portion of Wrangell, Alaska and Sweetbrier was dispatched to help fight the blaze. During the winter of 1954 the municipal water system of Hoonah, Alaska froze, leaving residents without running water for six days. Using steam and pressurized salt water, the crew of Sweetbrier was able to clear three-quarters of the system.

In July 1957 Sweetbrier was moved to Juneau, Alaska, where her mission responsibilities remained unchanged. One unusual event in her maintenance of aids to navigation was the aftermath of the 1964 Alaska earthquake. Tidal fluctuations washed away a number of buoys in Whitestone Narrows, northwest of Sitka. Sweetbrier turned back the ferry Malaspina rather than let her try to navigate the narrows without its buoys. Her search and rescue missions continued to revolve around the local fishing fleet. She was pressed into fire-fighting service again in August 1959 when the Juneau Plywood Mill burned. In December 1961 Sweetbrier was used to deliver the mail to Skagway. High winds had prevented planes from flying to town for two weeks and 9,000 pounds of holiday mail and packages were loaded into the ship's hold for delivery.

In August 1974 Sweetbrier sailed for the Coast Guard Yard for a major renovation. She was replaced in Juneau by USCGC Planetree which had just completed her mid-life renovation. Sweetbrier's Juneau-based crew transferred to Planetree, however, so it was Planetree's former crew who sailed Sweetbrier to the East Coast. Sweetbrier received the more extensive of the two mid-life renovations given to the 180-foot buoy tenders. Corroded hull plates were replaced with fresh steel. New electrical wiring and switchboards were installed. Fresh water and sewage pipes were replaced. The main electrical motor and its control systems were overhauled. A bow thruster was installed to improve maneuverability. Crew quarters were increased in size and modernized. The renovation was reported to have cost $2 million

After her renovation, Sweetbrier was assigned to Cordova, Alaska. In February 1976, while enroute to her new assignment, one of her sailors was killed at the Navy Fuel Facility pier at San Diego when he fell between the ship and the dock. Sweetbrier arrived at her new home port in March 1976. There she continued with her maintenance of aids to navigation, and assisting the local fishing fleet, but she had a new consideration. Cordova sits on the eastern edge of the supertanker route from the terminus of the Trans-Alaskan Pipeline System in Valdez to the Pacific Ocean. On 17 January 1980 the tanker Prince William Sound carrying 831,000 barrels of crude oil lost power and began drifting towards shore. Sweetbrier responded, but with gusts reaching 70 knots was unable to get a tow line to the disabled ship. After drifting for 16 hours, Prince William Sound was able to restart her engines and proceed safely, but by that time was only six miles from the rocky shore. On 24 March 1989, another supertanker on the same route met a worse fate. The Exxon Valdez ran aground on Bligh Reef in Prince William Sound spilling 10,800,000 US gallons (41,000 m^{3}) of crude oil. Sweetbrier was part of a large Coast Guard response to the spill. She performed air traffic control, salmon hatchery protection, and safety zone enforcement around the grounded tanker.

The Coast Guard planned for an orderly replacement of its World War II-vintage buoy tenders, retiring the older vessels as new ships were launched. Sweetbrier was decommissioned as part of this process at a ceremony in Cordova, Alaska on 27 August 2001. She was replaced at that station by USCGC Sycamore.

== Awards ==
Sweetbrier earned several awards during her Coast Guard service including the Asiatic–Pacific Campaign Medal, World War II Victory Medal, Navy Occupation Service Medal, three Meritorious Unit Commendations, and seven E-ribbons.

== Ghanaian service ==
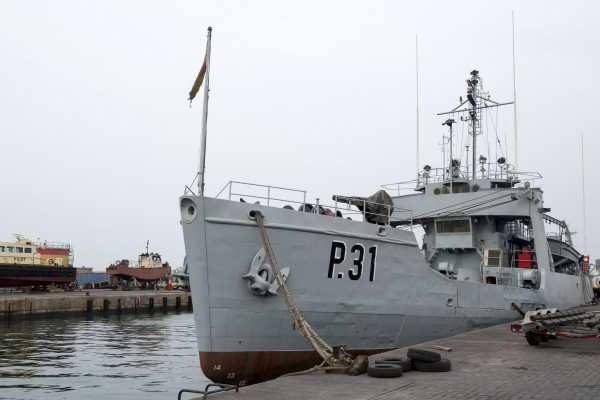
GNS Bonsu (ex-USCGC Sweetbrier) in 2015

On 26 October 2001 Sweetbrier was transferred to the Ghana Navy at a ceremony at the Coast Guard Yard. She was renamed GNS Bonsu and given a new pennant number, P31.

On 14 June 2003 attacks by an armed insurgency in Liberia required the evacuation of Ghanaian citizens from Monrovia. Bonsu evacuated over 1,300 people, vastly more than she was designed to carry, and made it back to Ghana in two and a half days. Less than a year later, on 19 March 2004, Bonsu and her sister ship GNS Anzone (ex-USCGC Woodrush) rescued 427 Ghanaians and others from civil unrest in Equatorial Guinea.
