= Brian L. Stafford =

United States Secret Service Agent

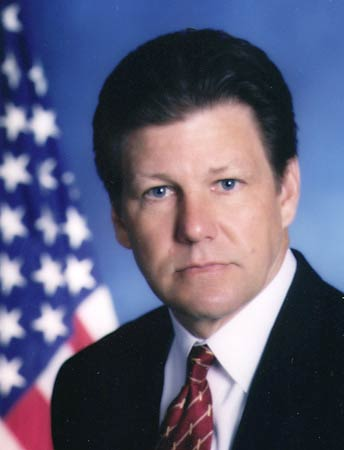
- Director of Secret Service, 2002

20th Director of the U.S. Secret Service
- In office March 4, 1999 – January 24, 2003
- President: Bill Clinton; George W. Bush
- Preceded by: Lewis C. Merletti
- Succeeded by: W. Ralph Basham

Personal details
- Born: 1948 (age 77–78) Sharpsville, Pennsylvania
- Occupation: Secret Service (1971-2023)

Brian L. Stafford (born 1948) was the 20th Director of the United States Secret Service. Preceded by Lewis C. Merletti, he was sworn in on March 4, 1999 by the then Secretary of the Treasury, Robert E. Rubin. He was succeeded by W. Ralph Basham.

Stafford served in the Secret Service from 1971 to 2003, serving as director from March 4, 1999 to January 24, 2003.

== Education ==
Stafford was born in Sharpsville, Pennsylvania in 1948. He attended Mount Union College, in Alliance, Ohio, where he received a Bachelor of Arts degree in Business Administration, and an honorary Doctorate in Humane Letters. Prior to his induction into the Secret Service, Stafford served in the United States Army. He completed a one-year tour of duty in Vietnam, where he earned the Bronze Star Medal. He has been bestowed with numerous other awards including the Vietnam Gallantry Cross with Palm, Vietnam Campaign Medal, Vietnam Service Medal, Army Commendation Medal, National Defense Service Medal, 1999 Presidential Rank Award, and the Adam Walsh Rainbow Award.

== Career ==
Stafford joined the United States Secret Service in 1971. His first occupation in the Secret Service was a special agent assigned to the Atlanta Field Office. He was later employed in various other positions such as the Assistant Director of the Office of Protective Operations and the Assistant Special Agent in Charge of the Office of Protective Operations. Stafford protected Presidents Richard Nixon, Gerald Ford, Jimmy Carter, Ronald Reagan, George H. W. Bush and Bill Clinton. He was also responsible for supervising several National Special Security Events including the 2002 Winter Olympics and the Super Bowl XXXVI. He retired in January 2003, after serving more than 30 years for the Secret Service.

Stafford serves as and advisor to McKinley Capital Management (formerly a Director); HandySoft Global Solutions, and Intific. He is on the Board of Directors of Point Blank Enterprises.; and is Vice Chairman of LexisNexis Special Services. He previously served as the Vice Chairman of the National Center for Missing and Exploited Children, and Chairman of Seisint. and the Vice Chairman of The National Center for Missing and Exploited Children.

Government offices
| Preceded by Lewis C. Merletti | Director of the United States Secret Service; 1999–2003 | Succeeded by W. Ralph Basham |
