= W. Ralph Basham =

American Secret Service agent

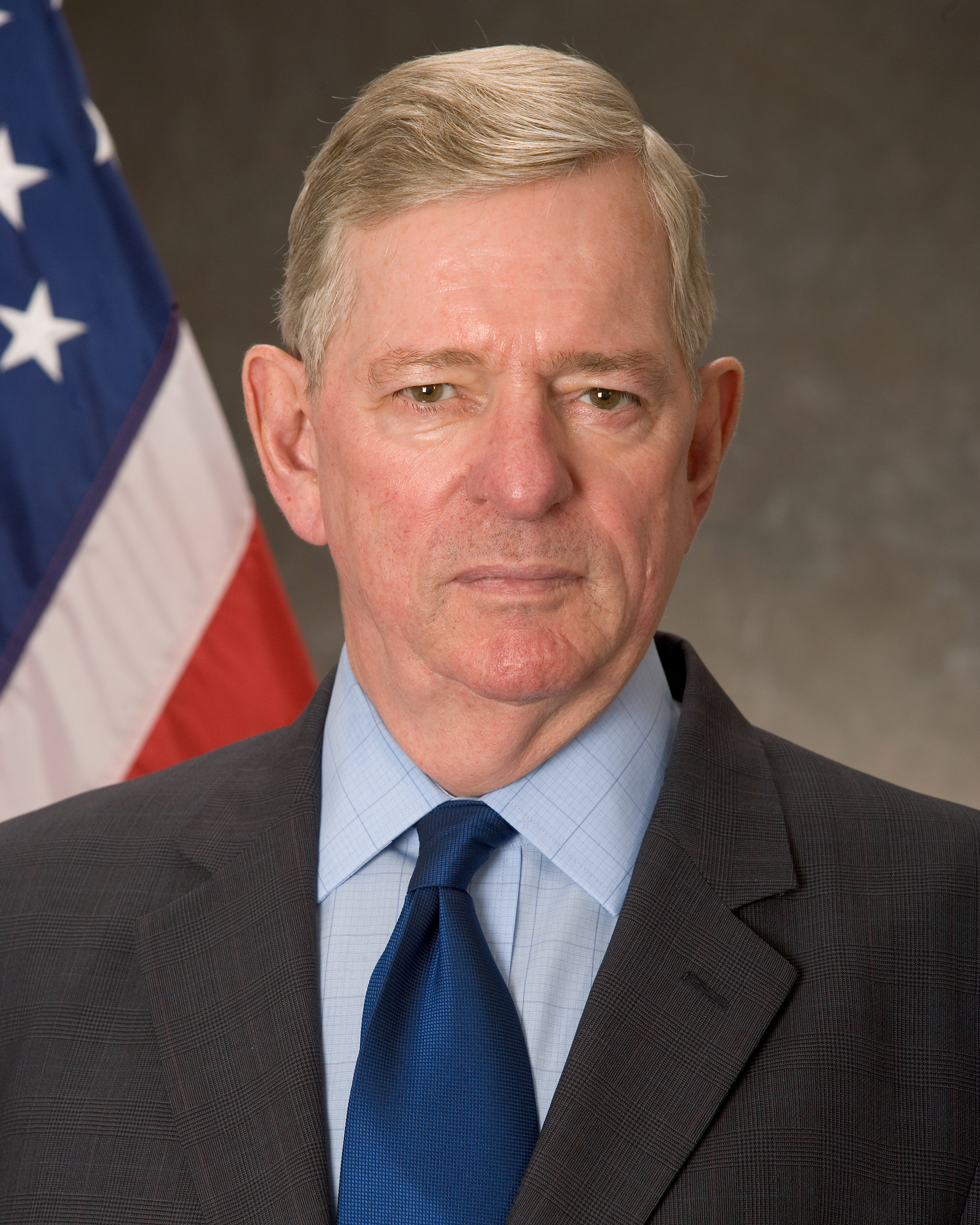

Commissioner for U.S. Customs and Border Protection
- In office June 6, 2006 – February 27, 2009
- President: George W. Bush; Barack Obama
- Preceded by: Robert C. Bonner
- Succeeded by: Alan Bersin

21st Director of the United States Secret Service
- In office 2003–2006
- President: George W. Bush
- Preceded by: Brian L. Stafford
- Succeeded by: Mark J. Sullivan

Personal details
- Born: November 17, 1943 (age 82) Owensboro, Kentucky, U.S.
- Education: Southeastern University (BS)

William Ralph Basham Jr. (born November 17, 1943) is an American law enforcement official who served as commissioner of U.S. Customs and Border Protection, director of the United States Secret Service, director of the Federal Law Enforcement Training Centers, and chief of staff of the Transportation Security Administration.

Upon leaving government service in April 2009, Basham founded Command Consulting Group, a Washington, D.C.–based international advisory firm which provides security advisory services to government clients and works with companies with security related products and services to develop and market products to federal security agencies.

In 2008, Basham was conferred the rank of Distinguished Executive by former U.S. President George W. Bush. In October 2013, Basham was awarded the Founder's Medal for Lifetime Achievement by the Border Patrol Foundation.

Basham is a Fellow of the National Academy of Public Administration.

== Early life and education ==
A native of Owensboro, Kentucky, Basham received a bachelor's degree from Southeastern University in Washington, D.C.

== Career ==
=== Secret Service ===
Basham's career with the United States Secret Service began in 1970, when he was appointed a special agent in the Washington Field Office. He rose rapidly to the managerial level while serving in a variety of assignments reflecting the Service's diverse interests and responsibilities. Consistent with the dual missions of the Secret Service, Basham has served in supervisory positions in both protective and investigative assignments, serving as special agent in charge of the Cleveland Field Office, the Washington Field Office, and the Vice Presidential Protective Division. Basham also served as the deputy assistant director of the Office of Training and as assistant director of the Office of Administration, where he was responsible for the management of the agency's administrative division, including financial management, personnel, procurement and strategic planning.

=== Federal Law Enforcement Training Centers ===
In January 1998, Basham was appointed director of the Federal Law Enforcement Training Centers (FLETC) by President Bill Clinton. The centers, located in Glynco, Georgia and Artesia, New Mexico, provide training for nearly all of the nation's federal law enforcement officers, including Secret Service agents. The FLETC also serves the state, local and federal law enforcement communities with training programs tailored to their specific needs.

=== Transportation Security Administration ===
In January 2002, Basham was recruited as one of the first employees and leaders of the Transportation Security Administration (TSA), a new agency within the Homeland Security created to secure America's aviation system following the September 11th, 2001 terrorist attack. Among his responsibilities at TSA, Basham oversaw the hiring of federal security directors for the nation's 429 major airports.

=== Return to U.S. Secret Service ===
On January 27, 2003, Basham returned to the agency as director, following the retirement of Brian L. Stafford.

=== U.S. Customs and Border Protection ===
President George W. Bush nominated Basham as commissioner of CBP on January 30, 2006. Basham was confirmed by the United States Senate in May 2006. CBP is responsible for border security and trade, including the United States Border Patrol and inspecting persons and items entering the United States through its ports of entry.

=== Global Trade Exchange ===
Basham was a lead proponent of the Global Trade Exchange (GTX), an intelligence-driven supply-chain data-mining effort that was one of three components of CBP's Secure Freight Initiative.

== Personal life ==
He is married to the former Judith O'Bryan and has three children, Paige, Craig, and Billy, and twelve grandchildren.
