= Border Patrol Foundation =

Charity organization

The Border Patrol Foundation
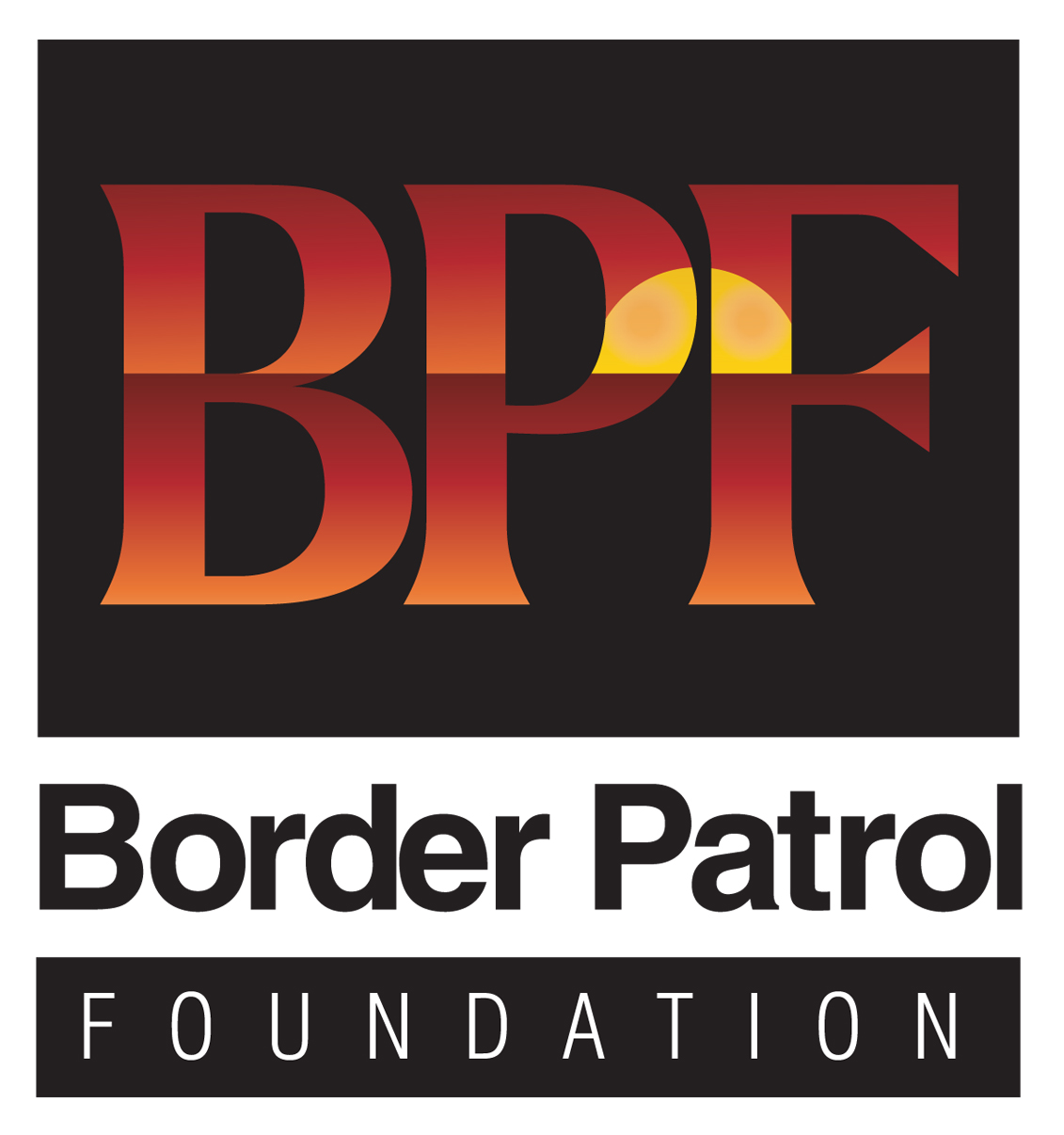
- Company type: Organization
- Industry: Non-Profit
- Founded: 2009
- Headquarters: Arlington, Virginia, United States
- Area served: Global
- Website: https://borderpatrolfoundation.org

The Border Patrol Foundation is a non-profit organization that provides assistance to the families of United States Border Patrol. BPF says that it provides financial assistance to the families of the United States Border Patrol for on and off-duty deaths, injuries, illnesses, family medical emergencies and special circumstances.

== History ==
On July 23, 2009, the Border Patrol Foundation was incorporated as a 501(c)(3) non profit organization, in Arizona. That evening, USBP Agent Robert Rosas was killed just north of the Mexico border near Campo, California, and his family was the first to receive assistance from the foundation.

BPF donates $10,000 to the surviving family whenever there is a death in the line of duty. It also provides funds for families to attend National Police Week in Washington, D.C., as well as its own annual recognition dinner. The Foundation is funded by a number of companies whose products are used by the Border Patrol. It has also seen a surge in donations since President Trump took office, allowing it to provide college scholarships for surviving children.

In November 2018, the president of the BPF, Ronald Colburn, defended the use of pepper spray, a less-than-lethal weapon, on migrants seeking to cross the Southern border, saying the pepper spray was "natural. You could actually put it on your nachos and eat it.".

The BPF holds an annual fundraising dinner in Washington, D.C. In 2018, the dinner was moved to Trump International Hotel, which "raised some eyebrows." The BPF insisted the move was purely practical. Acting Homeland Security Secretary Kevin McAleenan spoke at the 2019 dinner, the night before he resigned. In September 2019, it was reported that a private party for BPF deputy chief Scott Luck's retirement would be held at President Trump's golf resort in Virginia.
