= Mark Greenblatt =

American lawyer

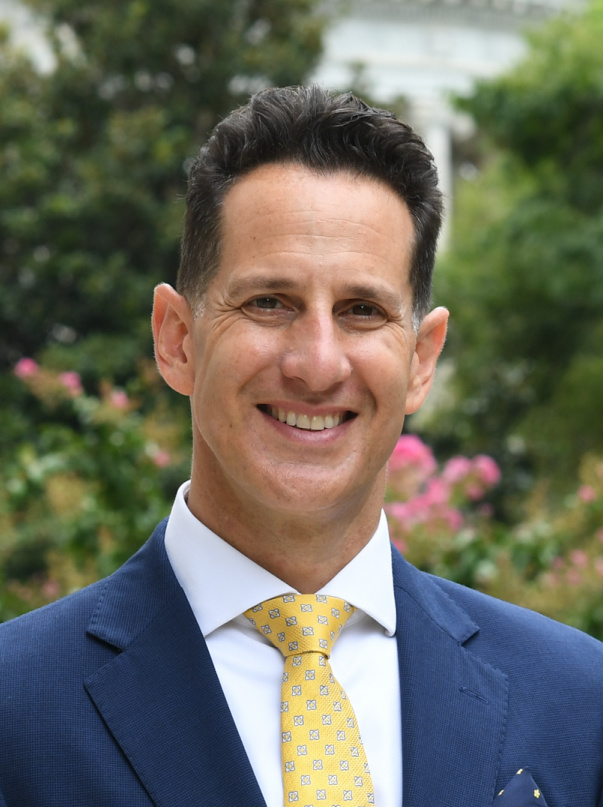
- Greenblatt in 2020

Inspector General of the Department of the Interior
- In office August 26, 2019 – January 24, 2025
- President: Donald Trump; Joe Biden; Donald Trump
- Preceded by: Mary Kendall (Acting)

Personal details
- Born: Mark Lee Greenblatt
- Education: Duke University (BA); Columbia University (JD)

Mark Lee Greenblatt is an American attorney and government official who had served as the Inspector General of the United States Department of the Interior. As the Department's 7th confirmed Inspector General, Mr. Greenblatt oversaw a nationwide workforce of more than 300 investigators, auditors, evaluators, attorneys, and support staff whose mission is to detect and deter waste, fraud, abuse, and misconduct in DOI programs, and to promote economy and efficiency in Departmental operations. Mr. Greenblatt was the senior official responsible for providing oversight of more than 70,000 Department employees, assessing the Department's diverse programs with more than $10 billion in grants and contracts, and conducting complex administrative and criminal investigations.

On January 24, 2025 President Donald Trump fired Mr. Greenblatt along with several other inspectors general.

== Education ==
Greenblatt received his A.B., with distinction, from Duke University. He received his J.D. from Columbia Law School, where he was a Harlan Fiske Stone Scholar. Greenblatt was a Senior Managers in Government Fellow at the John F. Kennedy School of Government at Harvard University.

He is also a Certified Fraud Examiner and graduated from the Experienced Leader Program at American University sponsored by the Council of Inspectors General on Integrity and Efficiency.

== Career ==
Greenblatt began his legal career by clerking for the Honorable Anita B. Brody of the United States District Court for the Eastern District of Pennsylvania. Following his clerkship, he worked as a litigator at two law firms in New York City.

In 2003, he joined the staff of the United States Senate Homeland Security Permanent Subcommittee on Investigations as an Investigative Counsel. He was promoted to Deputy Chief Counsel and later became Minority Staff Director and Chief Counsel. During his five-year tenure at the U.S. Senate Permanent Subcommittee on Investigations, Greenblatt led or supervised numerous complex, bipartisan inquiries that identified waste and abuses in important programs, such as Medicare and the United Nations. For instance, he led the Subcommittee's investigation into waste, fraud, and abuse in the United Nations' Oil-for-Food Program, a $64-billion operation involving numerous complex international transactions.

In 2009, Greenblatt became an investigative counsel at the United States Department of Justice's Office of Inspector General. In that role, he led several investigations into senior-level misconduct and other sensitive matters, such as allegations of conflict of interest, nepotism, and misuse of office by senior DOJ officials.

In 2014, Greenblatt joined the staff of the U.S. Department of Commerce's Office of Inspector General as Director of Special Investigations. He was later promoted to Deputy Assistant Inspector General for Compliance and Ethics and subsequently to Assistant Inspector General for Investigations. In 2017, President Trump nominated Greenblatt to serve as Inspector General of the Export–Import Bank of the United States. Greenblatt's nomination was approved by the United States Senate Committee on Banking, Housing, and Urban Affairs and the United States Senate Committee on Homeland Security and Governmental Affairs, but the vote was never taken up by the Senate. On January 17, 2019, Greenblatt was nominated by President Donald Trump to be Inspector General of the Department of the United States Department of the Interior, and on August 1, 2019, the Senate confirmed his nomination by voice vote.

On June 9, 2021, the Office of the Inspector General issued a report titled "Review of U.S. Park Police Actions at Lafayette Park", concerning the police actions in Lafayette Square of June 1, 2020. The report said, "The evidence we obtained did not support a finding that the USPP cleared the park to allow the President to survey the damage and walk to St. John's Church. Instead, the evidence we reviewed showed that the USPP cleared the park to allow the contractor to safely install the antiscale fencing in response to destruction of property and injury to officers occurring on May 30 and 31." The report claimed that the decision to clear Lafayette Park had been made two days earlier, on May 30. Also on June 9, Inspector General Greenblatt issued a statement titled "Statement from Inspector General Mark Lee Greenblatt Regarding Special Review Report 'Review of U.S. Park Police Actions at Lafayette Park'", reaffirming the Report's claims that the decision to clear of Lafayette Square was made on May 30, two days before it was carried out. The Inspector General's report raised some media skepticism. For example, The Daily Beast characterized as "bizarre" the claim that the purpose of clearing Lafayette Square was to enable the construction of the fence.

On January 24, 2025 President Donald Trump fired Mr. Greenblatt along with several other inspectors general. In response, Hannibal "Mike" Ware, the chair of the Council of the Inspectors General on Integrity and Efficiency (CIGIE), pointed out the lack of legal standing of the removals, as notification to Congress 30 days in advance is required by law. While President Trump had stated his intent and reasons why to fire many of the IG, back in November 2024, it appears that Congress was not notified as required.

== Publications ==
Greenblatt authored a book, Valor: Unsung Heroes From Iraq, Afghanistan, and the Home Front, which was published by Rowman & Littlefield Publishing Group in 2014. Valor was a finalist for the 2016 William E. Colby Award for military writing. The book was endorsed by numerous military figures, including Gen. David Petraeus, Gen. John R. Allen, and three Medal of Honor recipients.

Following the publication of Valor, Greenblatt authored or co-authored more than a dozen articles, interviews, and book reviews, largely on the topic of military heroism, for Military.com, Task & Purpose, Soldier of Fortune, Real Clear Defense, and other publications.
