= U.S. Department of the Interior, Office of Inspector General =

Government body

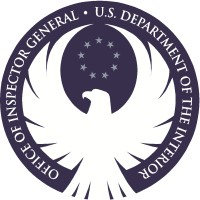
- USDOI Office of the Inspector General seal
- Formed: 1978
- Headquarters: Washington, D.C.
- Parent agency: U.S. Department of the Interior
- Inspector General: Caryl Brzymialkiewicz (acting)
- Website: www.doioig.gov

The U.S. Department of the Interior Office of Inspector General (DOI OIG) is one of the Inspector General offices created by the Inspector General Act of 1978. The Inspector General for the Department of the Interior is charged with investigating and auditing department programs to combat waste, fraud, and abuse.

== History of Inspectors General ==
Inspector General	Appointment date
Caryl Brzymialkiewicz (Acting)	January 24, 2025
Mark Greenblatt	August 26, 2019
Gail S. Ennis (Acting)	May 28, 2019
Mary Kendall (Acting)	January 1, 2012
Earl Devaney	August 5, 1999
Robert J. Williams (Acting)	March 29, 1999
Eljay B. Bowron	November 2, 1998
Richard Reback (Acting)	July 1, 1998
Robert J. Williams (Acting)	January 8, 1998
Wilma A. Lewis	April 10, 1995
Joyce Fleischman (Acting)	April 1, 1993
James R. Richards	January 6, 1986
Thomas T. Sheehan (Acting)	September 8, 1985
Robert W. Beuley (Acting)	May 2, 1985
Arthur J. Dellinger Sr. (Acting Deputy)	October 26, 1984
Robert W. Beuley (Acting)	October 1, 1981
Richard Mulberry	July 14, 1981
June Brown	May 10, 1979
William Kendig (Acting IG, Deputy IG)	October 17, 1978
