= Robert Earl (U.S. Marine) =

U.S Marine Corps officer

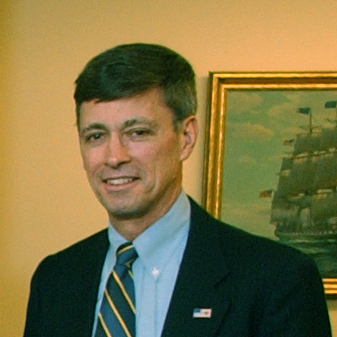
- Education: United States Naval Academy
- Military career
- Allegiance: United States
- Branch: United States Navy
- Rank: Lieutenant colonel
- Commands: United States Marines

Robert Earl was a United States Marine lieutenant colonel and a deputy to Oliver North at the National Security Agency during the early 1980s.

== Early life ==
Earl graduated from the U.S. Naval Academy in 1967. He was also a Rhodes Scholar.

== Iran-Contra ==
Earl is most famous for being involved with the 1980s Iran-Contra scandal supply effort and participated in the destruction of records. He was granted immunity for his testimony.

Oliver North had been a professional acquaintance of Robert Earl since their time together at the Naval Academy. After graduation from the Academy, Earl and North often crossed paths during their careers.

== Later career ==
During the George W. Bush presidency, Earl was appointed as chief of staff to acting Deputy Defense Secretary Gordon R. England.
