= MS Prinsendam (1972) =

Cruise ship

Coordinates: 55.883°N 136.450°W

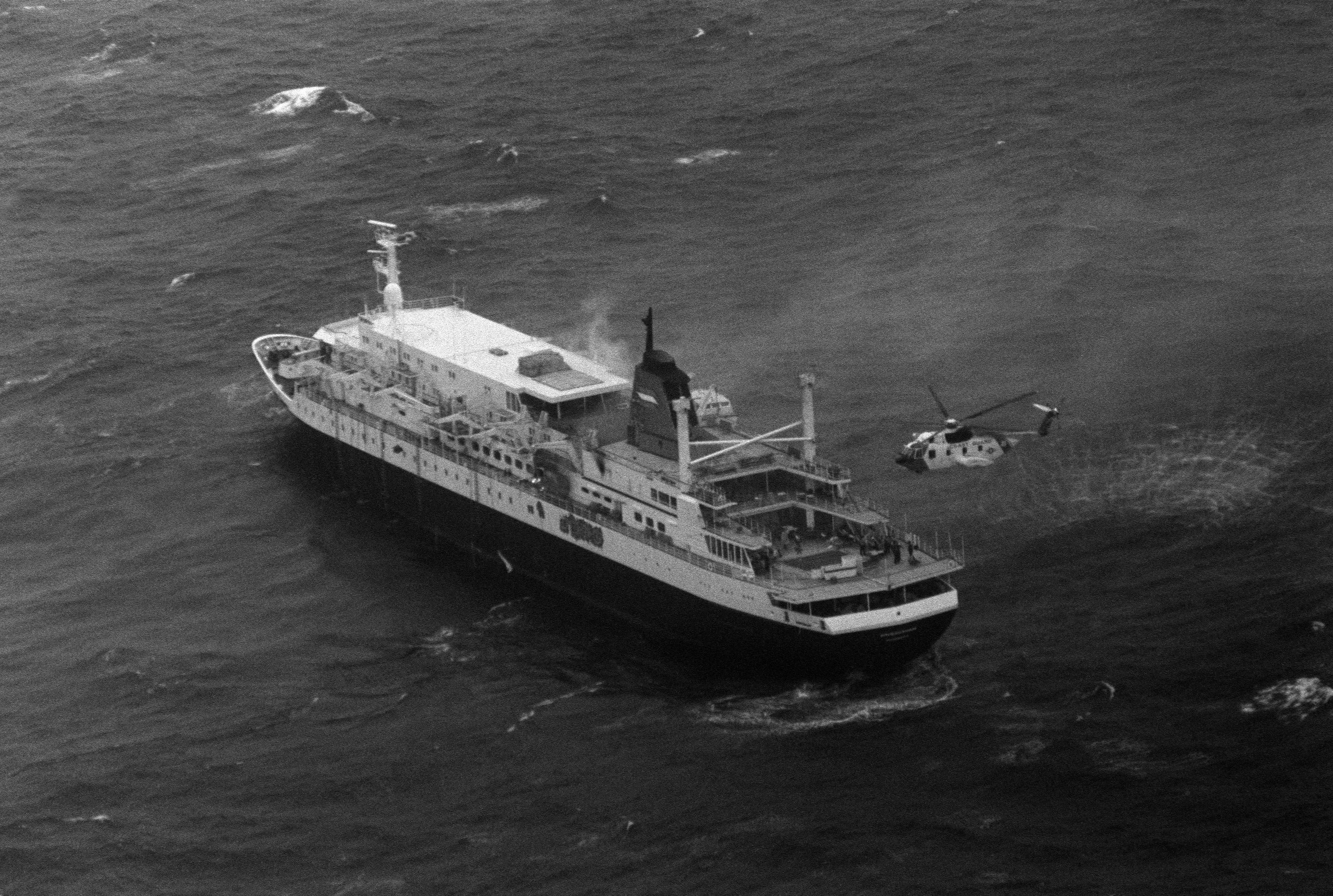
- MS Prinsendam on fire off Alaska, 1980

History

Netherlands
- Name: Prinsendam
- Operator: Holland America Line
- Builder: De Merwede in Hardinxveld-Giessendam, Netherlands
- Cost: US$27 million
- Launched: 7 July 1972
- Completed: 1973
- Maiden voyage: 1973
- In service: 1973
- Out of service: October 4, 1980
- Identification: IMO number: 7224734
- Fate: Sank 11 October 1980

General characteristics
- Length: 427 ft (130 m)
- Capacity: 350 passengers
- Crew: 200

MS Prinsendam, was a Holland America Line cruise ship built at Shipyard de Merwede in the Netherlands in 1973. She was 427 feet (130 m) long and typically carried about 350 passengers and 200 crew members.

== Sinking ==
Prinsendam departed Vancouver, British Columbia, Canada, on 30 September 1980 for a long cruise that would take her along the Inside Passage of British Columbia and Southeast Alaska and then to East Asia and Southeast Asia. After calling at Ketchikan, Alaska, on 2 October and visiting Glacier Bay on 3 October, she set out into the Gulf of Alaska on the evening of 3 October bound for Japan. She was approximately 120 nautical miles (222 km; 138 mi) south of Yakutat, Alaska, at 12:40 a.m. on 4 October 1980 when a fire broke out in her engine room. Her master, Cornelis Dirk Wabeke (13 April 1928 – 16 August 2011), declared the fire out of control one hour later and Prinsendam sent a radio call requesting immediate assistance. The United States Coast Guard at Communications Station Kodiak in Kodiak, Alaska, requested that Prinsendam send out an SOS to alert other vessels in the area, but Wabeke declined. Chief Radio Officer Jack van der Zee sent one out anyway about a half-hour later.

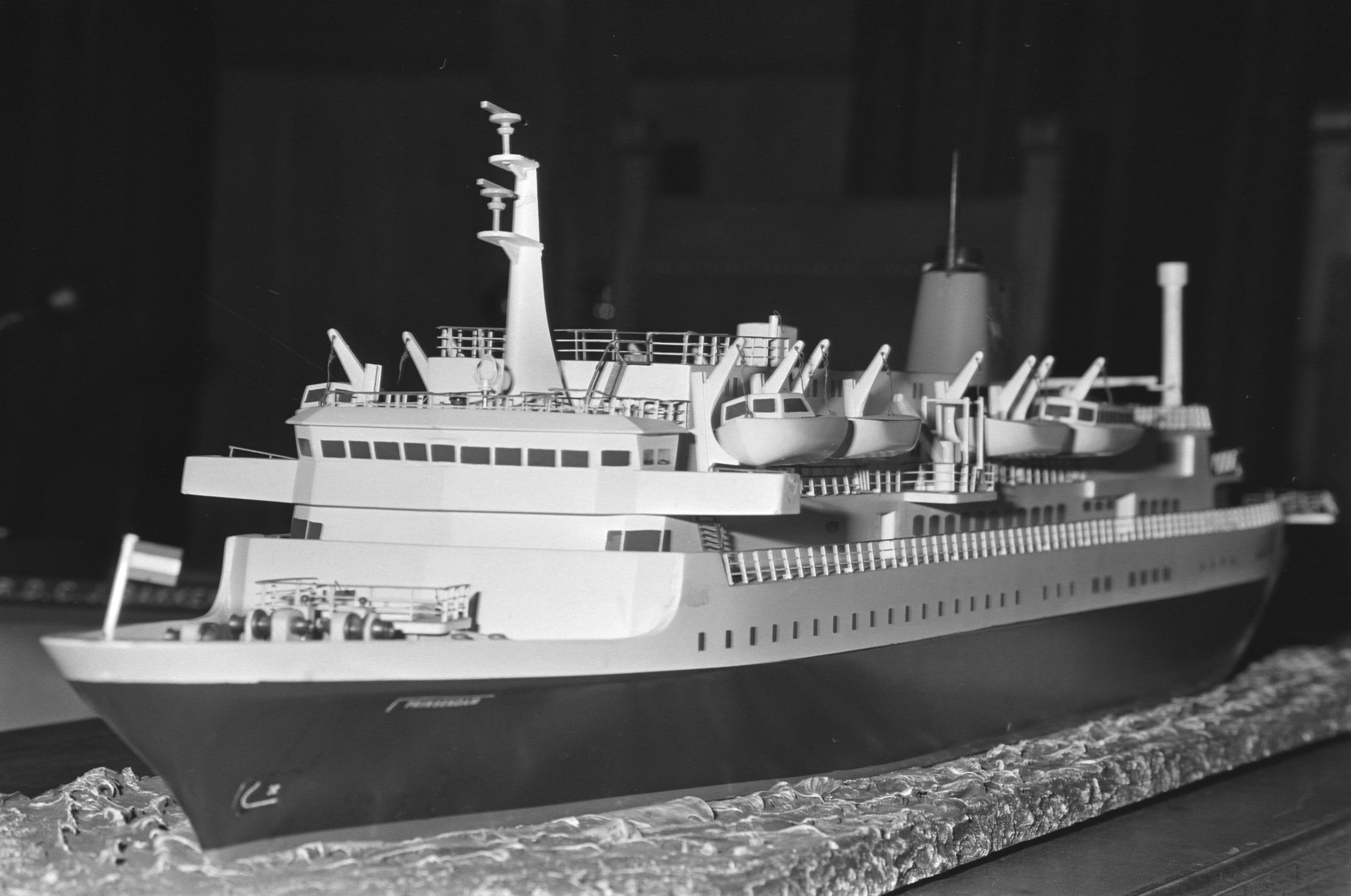
A model of MS Prinsendam.

U.S. Coast Guard, United States Air Force Air Rescue Service, and Canadian Armed Forces Air Command CH-113 helicopters, which had greater range, rescued the passengers and crew. The rescue took place during a period of steadily deteriorating weather.

The U.S. Coast Guard cutters USCGC Boutwell (WHEC-719), USCGC Mellon (WHEC-717), and USCGC Woodrush (WLB-407) responded in concert with other vessels in the area, and the American tankers Sohio Intrepid and Williamsburgh assisted on scene. Williamsburgh served a vital role as a communications platform and was the first vessel to arrive on scene and take passengers on board. The Sohio Intrepid served as a platform for one of the U.S. Air Force helicopters that was unable to refuel in flight. Two U.S. Air Force pararescuemen went aboard one of Prinsendam's lifeboats, and this boat was the last rescued after a lookout aboard Woodrush, Seaman Louis Roderick, sighted a flare from the boat and word of the sighting was relayed to the on-scene commander aboard Boutwell.

The rescue is particularly noteworthy because of the distance traveled by the rescuers, the coordination of independent organizations, and the fact that all 520 passengers and crew were rescued without loss of life or serious injury.

Prinsendam finally capsized and sank on 11 October 1980.
