= USCGC Woodrush =

Buoy tender

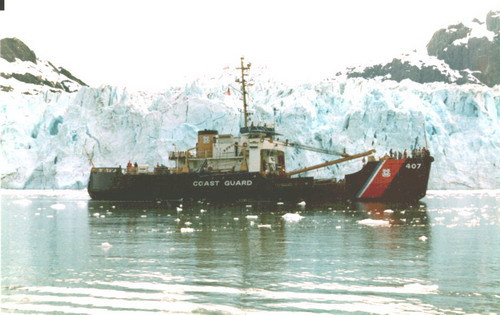
- USCGS Woodrush (WLB-407)

History

United States
- Name: Woodrush.
- Namesake: Woodrush
- Builder: Zenith Dredge Company, Duluth, Minnesota.
- Cost: $926,156.00 USD.
- Laid down: 4 February 1944.
- Launched: 28 April 1944.
- Commissioned: 22 September 1944.
- Decommissioned: 2 March 2001, sold to Republic of Ghana.
- In service: 1944.
- Out of service: 2001.
- Refit: July 1978 to March 1980 at CGY, Curtis Bay, Maryland.
- Home port: Duluth, Minnesota (1944). Sitka, Alaska (1980).
- Nickname(s): Woodie
- Fate: Sold to Ghana Navy.

Ghana
- Name: Anzone
- Commissioned: 2001
- Status: Active

General characteristics
- Class & type: Iris or C class 180-foot buoy tender.
- Type: Coast Guard, Auxiliary, General, Lighthouse (tender) WAGL. Coast Guard, Large, Buoy (tender) WLB.
- Length: 180 ft (55 m)
- Beam: 37 ft (11 m)
- Draft: 12 ft (3.7 m) 6 inches (150 mm).
- Ice class: Notched forefoot, ice-belt at waterline, reinforced bow and stern.
- Propulsion: 2 Cooper-Bessemer Diesel Engines; 1,200 SHP; single screw (1944).
- Speed: 13 knots (24 km/h; 15 mph).
- Range: 8,000 nmi (15,000 km; 9,200 mi) at 13 knots (24 km/h; 15 mph).
- Endurance: Max: 13.5 knots, 10,000-mile range (1962) Economic: 10.5 knots, 13,000-mile range (1962).
- Capacity: Diesel Oil: 43,000 gallons. Potable Water: 12,500 gallons.
- Complement: 47 (1962).
- Sensors & processing systems: Electronics: Radar SL-1. Sonar QCU.
- Armament: Wartime: 20mm guns, 1 × 3 inch gun, depth charges, M2 Browning machine guns and small arms. Peacetime: M2 Browning machine guns, M60 machine guns, and small arms.
- Notes: Ship USCG callsign was NODZ. Ship was equipped with a 20-ton electric boom.

USCGC Woodrush (WLB-407) was a buoy tender that performed general aids-to-navigation, search and rescue, and icebreaking duties for the United States Coast Guard (USCG) from 1944 to 2001 from home ports of Duluth, Minnesota and Sitka, Alaska. She responded from Duluth at full speed through a gale and high seas to the scene of the SS Edmund Fitzgerald sinking in 1975. In 1980, she took part in a rescue rated in the top 10 USCG rescues when she helped to save the passengers and crew of the cruise ship Prinsendam after it caught fire in position 57°38"N 140° 25"W then while being towed sank off Graham Island, British Columbia. She was one of the first vessels to respond to the Exxon Valdez oil spill in 1989. She was decommissioned on 2 March 2001 and sold to the Republic of Ghana to serve in the Ghana Navy.

== Construction and design ==
Woodrush was built by the Zenith Dredge Company in Duluth, Minnesota as a 180 feet (55 m), Iris or C-Class tender. Her keel was laid on 4 February 1944, and she was launched on 28 April 1944. Like the "A" and "B" class tenders in the 180 feet (55 m) class, her design was based upon that of USCGC Juniper (WLM 224). Like Juniper, Woodrush was constructed of welded steel but featured several improvements over the earlier design. Her hull had a notched forefoot, ice-belt at the waterline, and a reinforced bow for icebreaking capabilities. Her superstructure was extended to the ship's sides for increased interior volume above the main deck. Her finer lines in the bow and stern and deeper draft were designed to increase seaworthiness.

This utilitarian design allowed the vessel to serve as a search and rescue or naval platform. Twin diesel generators powered an electric motor that turned a single propeller. As a C-Class tender, Woodrush carried more fuel than the "A" and "B" class tenders. Unlike the "A' class tenders, which had been built with an A-frame ship's crane to lift buoys and the like, the "B" and " C" class tenders like Woodrush used a stout cargo boom manipulated by "power vangs" of wire rope which ran from the bridge wings of the superstructure to the tip of the boom.

== Commissioning ==
Woodrush was commissioned on 22 September 1944 under the command of LCDR F. D. Hagaman, USCG. In keeping with the Lighthouse Service practice of naming tenders after foliage, she was named after the woodrush plant. She was assigned general aids to navigation and icebreaking duties with Duluth, Minnesota as her home port.

== History ==
Woodrush performed many duties and missions in the Duluth, Minnesota district until 31 July 1978. She was part of the icebreaking fleet of buoy tenders that kept the shipping lanes open on the Great Lakes a month longer in the winter and months earlier in the spring. This was considered key to the economy of the Great Lakes region. A former commanding officer of Woodrush reported that he deliberately grounded her many times during her buoy tending duties because that was the only way some of the buoys could be set.

The Woodrush conducted many rescues during her long U.S. Coast Guard career. She rescued three lightkeepers in the early 1960s who were stranded for three days after an explosion at the remote Stannard Rock Light in Lake Superior.

As the only available U.S. Coast Guard cutter available to respond to the Fitzgerald sinking on 10 November 1975, Woodrush was ordered from Duluth at "full speed" through a "gale and high seas" and arrived on scene within 24 hours. She combed the area along with the SS William Clay Ford and the SS Arthur M. Anderson until daybreak, when debris and oil were finally located. The following summer, Woodrush served as a support vessel for the United States Navy ROV, the CURV, that was used to survey the Fitzgerald wreck.

A few years later, Woodrush was called out to help break ice for some freighters near the Soo Locks. Woodrush eventually got trapped in the ice, and was floated by the ice until it managed to get free, passing right over the Fitzgerald wreck site.

From 31 July 1978 to 31 March 1980, Woodrush underwent a major renovation at U.S. Coast Guard Yard Curtis Bay, Maryland. She received new diesel engines, a thorough overhaul of her main electrical motor and its control systems, installation of new electrical wiring and switchboards, new water piping and sewage handling systems, and a bow thruster to improve her maneuverability. The crew's living spaces were upgraded and the furnishings were modernized.

On 3 June 1980, Woodrush replaced USCGC Clover (WLB-292) in Sitka, Alaska where she home ported for the rest of her U.S. Coast Guard career performing aids to navigation, icebreaking, and search and rescue duties.

In 1980, Woodrush helped rescue the passengers and crew from the cruise ship MS Prinsendam that caught fire and sank off Graham Island, British Columbia. The Prinsendam rescue is rated by the U.S. Coast Guard as one of the ten most successful rescues because the nearest airstrip was 130 miles (210 km) from the disaster, operations were coordinated with other vessels in the area and Canadian helicopters, and the crew and 520 passengers were rescued without loss of life or serious injury.

In 1993, she went to the assistance of the grounded cruise ship, the MV Yorktown Clipper.

After serving the U.S. Coast Guard for 57 years, Woodrush was decommissioned on 2 March 2001 and sold to the Republic of Ghana to serve in Ghana Navy as GNS Anzone P30.

== Photo gallery ==
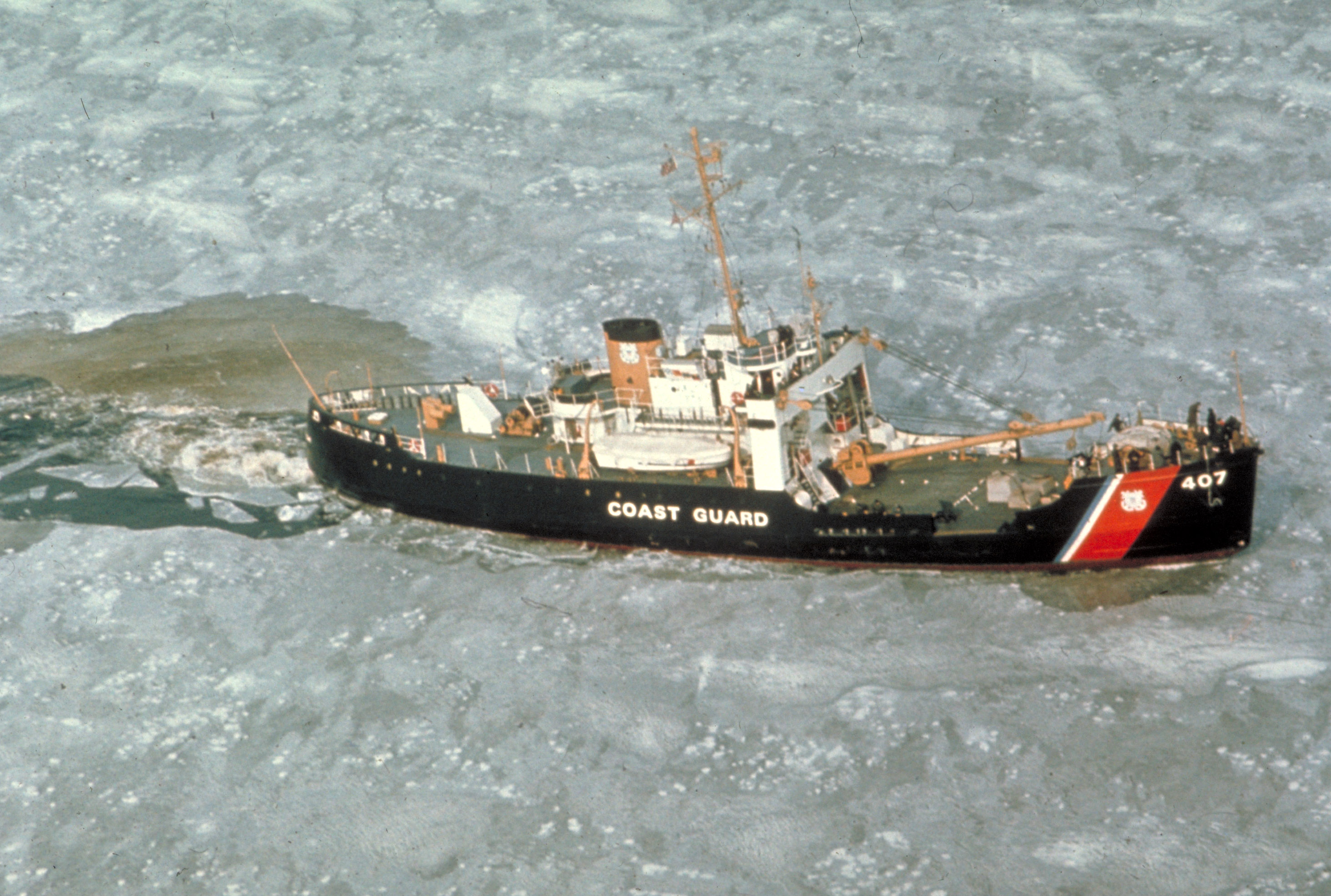
USCGC Woodrush (WLB-407) breaking ice on the Great Lakes

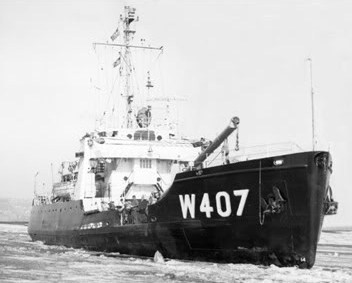
Circa 1960s – USCGC Woodrush (WLB-407) breaking ice on the Great Lakes

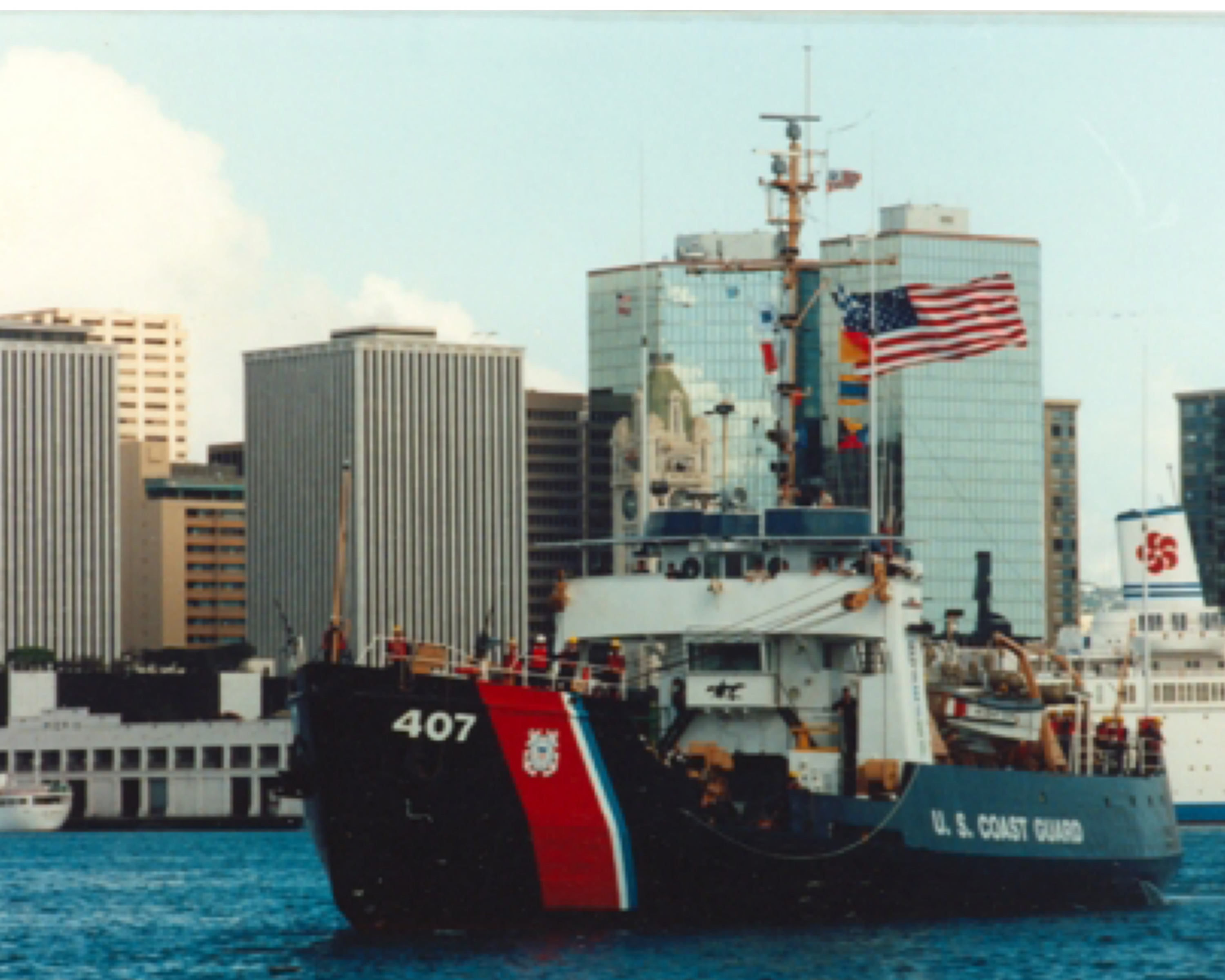
Original USCG caption: "Solid Gold! Woodrush returns to port after the final battle problem for REFTRA 92 earning a 5th consecutive clean sweep!"; 1992.

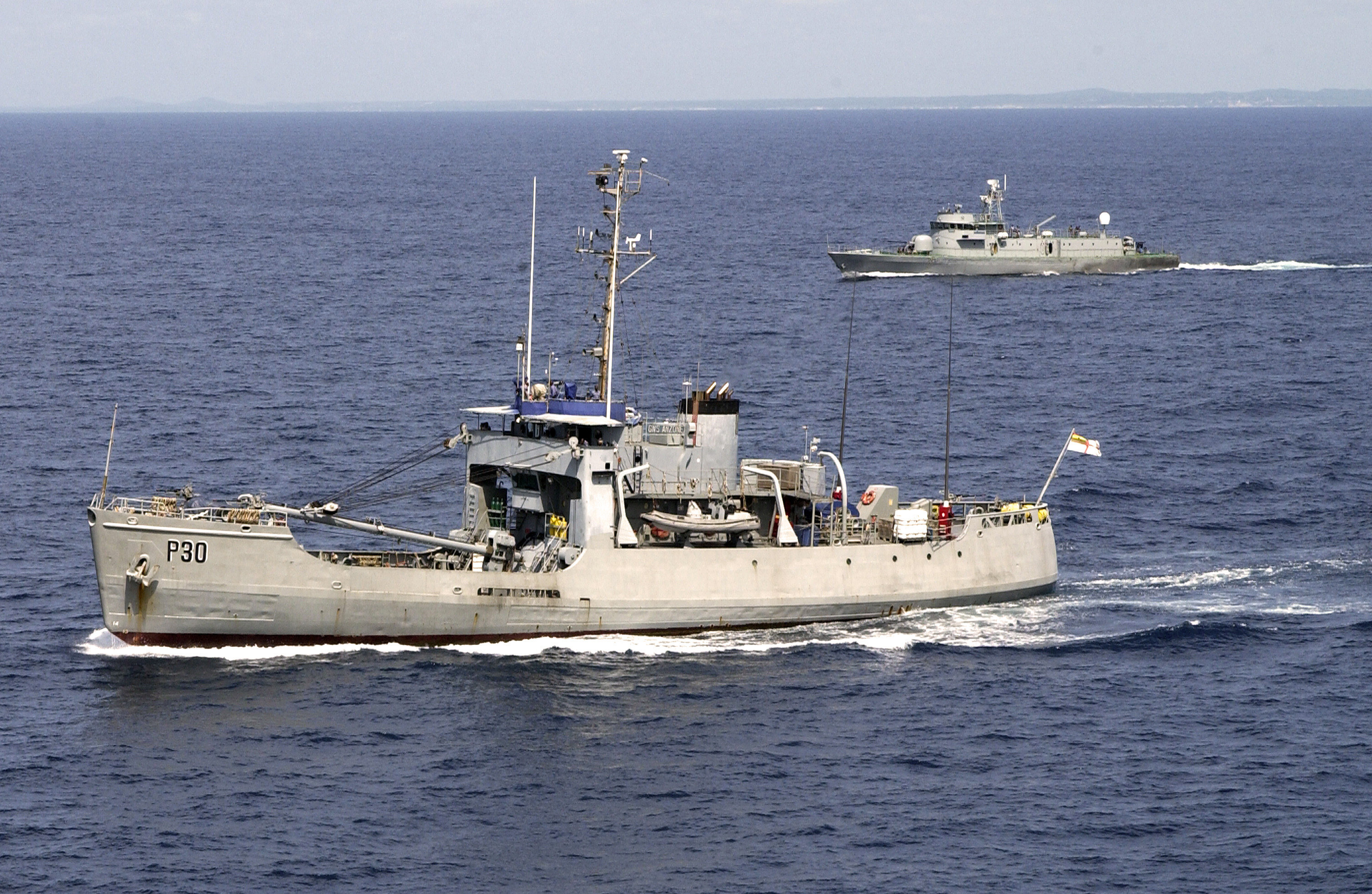
GNS Anzone P30 (former Woodrush (WLB-407))

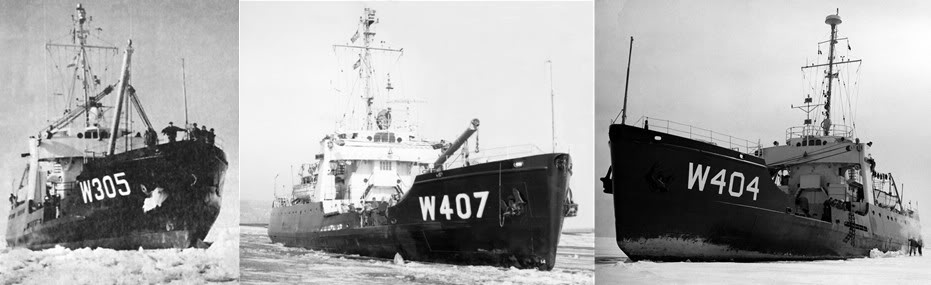
Woodrush breaking ice on the Great Lakes, 1960s
